= Plagnole =

- Commune
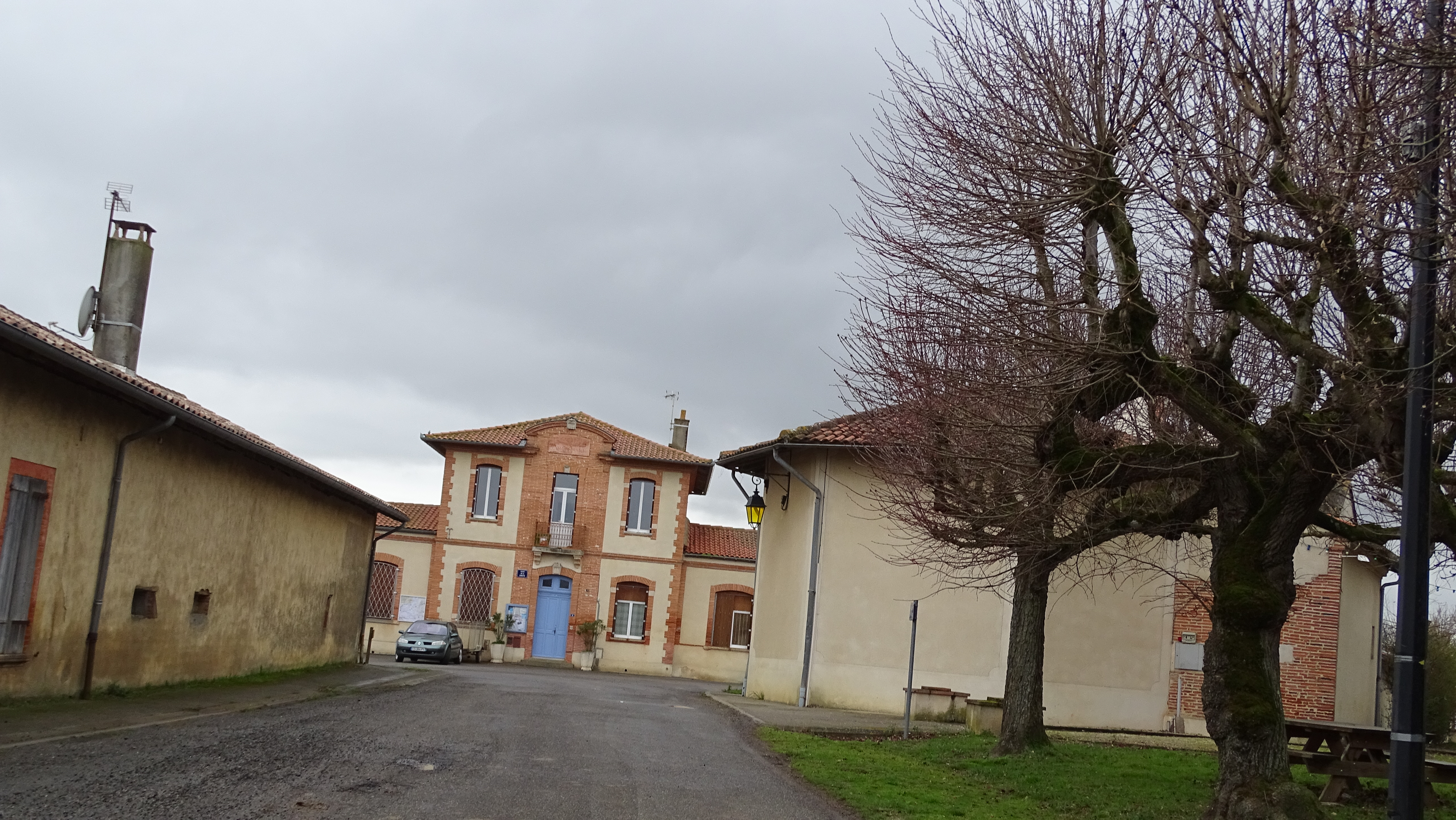
- The town hall in Plagnole

- Coat of arms
- Location of Plagnole
- Location within France Location within Occitanie
- Coordinates: 43°24′51″N 1°03′25″E
- Country: France
- Region: Occitania
- Department: Haute-Garonne
- Arrondissement: Muret
- Canton: Cazères

Government
  - Mayor (2020–2026): Georges Dupuy
- Area^{1}: 7.24 km^{2} (2.80 sq mi)
- Elevation: 350 m (1,150 ft)
- Highest elevation: 347 m (1,138 ft)
- Lowest elevation: 228 m (748 ft)
- Population (2023): 348
  - Density: 48.1/km^{2} (124/sq mi)
- Time zone: UTC+01:00 (CET)
  - Summer (DST): UTC+02:00 (CEST)
- INSEE/Postal code: 31423 /31370
- ^{1} French Land Register data, which excludes lakes, ponds, glaciers > 1 km^{2} (0.386 sq mi or 247 acres) and river estuaries.

Plagnole (French pronunciation: [plaɲɔl]; Occitan: Planhòla) is a commune in the Haute-Garonne department in southwestern France.

== Population ==
Historical population
Year	Pop.	±% p.a.
1968	128	—
1975	131	+0.33%
1982	147	+1.66%
1990	214	+4.81%
1999	271	+2.66%
2007	269	−0.09%
2012	287	+1.30%
2017	305	+1.22%
2023	348	+2.22%
Source: INSEE

== See also ==
- Communes of the Haute-Garonne department
