= Francon =

- Commune
- Coat of arms
- Location of Francon
- Location within France Location within Occitanie
- Coordinates: 43°15′39″N 0°58′26″E
- Country: France
- Region: Occitania
- Department: Haute-Garonne
- Arrondissement: Muret
- Canton: Cazères

Government
  - Mayor (2020–2026): Julie Albouy
- Area^{1}: 9.54 km^{2} (3.68 sq mi)
- Elevation: 450 m (1,480 ft)
- Highest elevation: 365 m (1,198 ft)
- Lowest elevation: 255 m (837 ft)
- Population (2023): 236
  - Density: 24.7/km^{2} (64.1/sq mi)
- Time zone: UTC+01:00 (CET)
  - Summer (DST): UTC+02:00 (CEST)
- INSEE/Postal code: 31196 /31420
- ^{1} French Land Register data, which excludes lakes, ponds, glaciers > 1 km^{2} (0.386 sq mi or 247 acres) and river estuaries.

Francon (French pronunciation: [fʁɑ̃kɔ̃]) is a commune in the Haute-Garonne department in southwestern France. It is situated about 55 km southwest of Toulouse.

== Population ==
Historical population
Year	Pop.	±% p.a.
1968	181	—
1975	169	−0.98%
1982	173	+0.33%
1990	172	−0.07%
1999	168	−0.26%
2007	190	+1.55%
2012	223	+3.25%
2017	243	+1.73%
2023	236	−0.49%
Source: INSEE

== See also ==
- Communes of the Haute-Garonne department
