= Peyrouzet =

- Commune
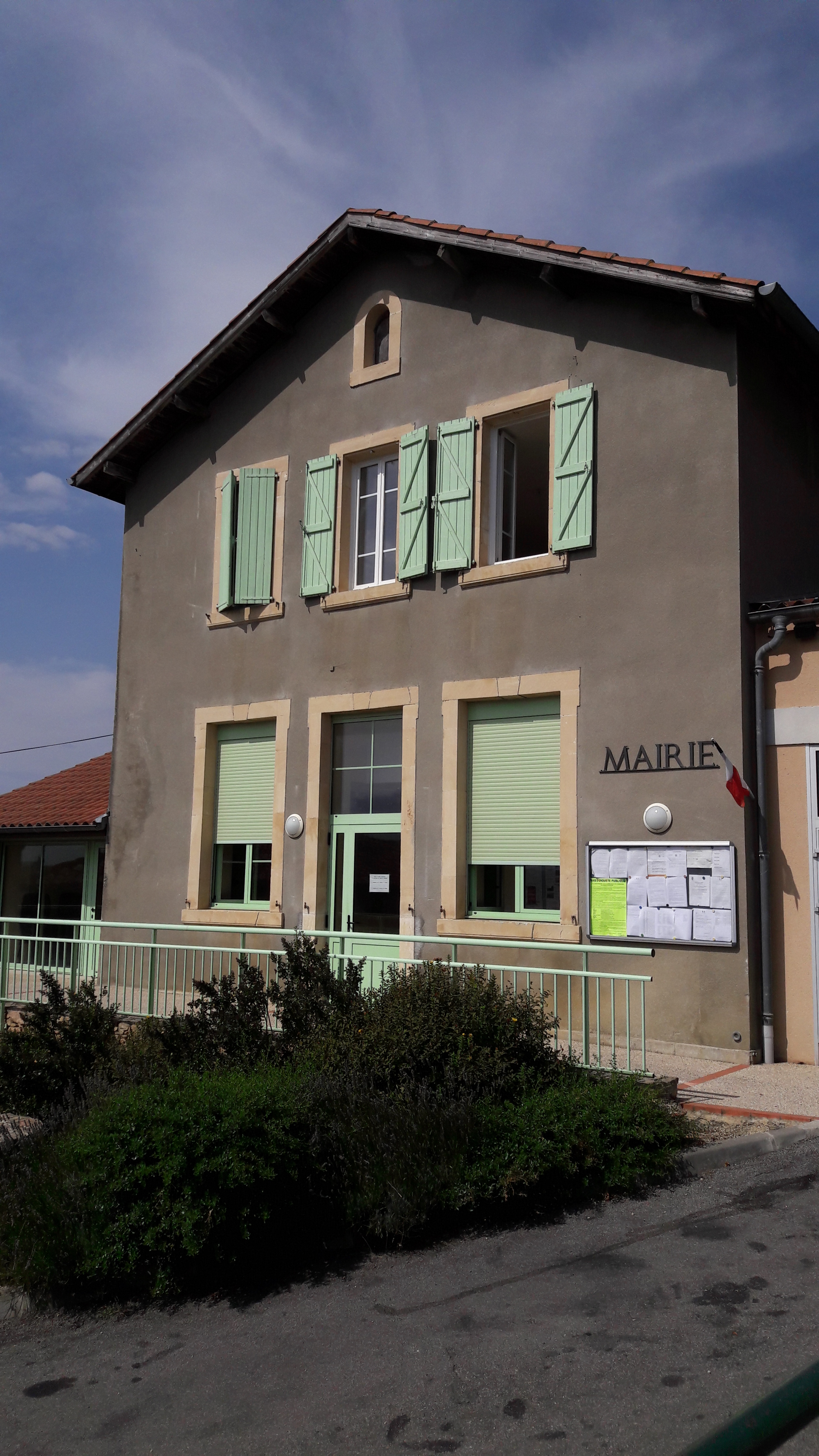
- The town hall in Peyrouzet
- Location of Peyrouzet
- Location within France Location within Occitanie
- Coordinates: 43°12′09″N 0°49′55″E
- Country: France
- Region: Occitania
- Department: Haute-Garonne
- Arrondissement: Saint-Gaudens
- Canton: Cazères
- Intercommunality: Cœur et Coteaux du Comminges

Government
  - Mayor (2020–2026): Philippe Lagrange
- Area^{1}: 4.88 km^{2} (1.88 sq mi)
- Elevation: 400 m (1,300 ft)
- Highest elevation: 403 m (1,322 ft)
- Lowest elevation: 302 m (991 ft)
- Population (2023): 81
  - Density: 17/km^{2} (43/sq mi)
- Time zone: UTC+01:00 (CET)
  - Summer (DST): UTC+02:00 (CEST)
- INSEE/Postal code: 31415 /31420
- ^{1} French Land Register data, which excludes lakes, ponds, glaciers > 1 km^{2} (0.386 sq mi or 247 acres) and river estuaries.

Peyrouzet (French pronunciation: [pɛʁuzɛ]; Occitan: Peirosèt) is a commune in the Haute-Garonne department in southwestern France.

== Population ==
Historical population
Year	Pop.	±% p.a.
1968	81	—
1975	72	−1.67%
1982	62	−2.11%
1990	58	−0.83%
1999	79	+3.49%
2007	96	+2.47%
2012	93	−0.63%
2017	84	−2.02%
2023	81	−0.60%
Source: INSEE

== See also ==
- Communes of the Haute-Garonne department
