= Fustignac =

- Commune
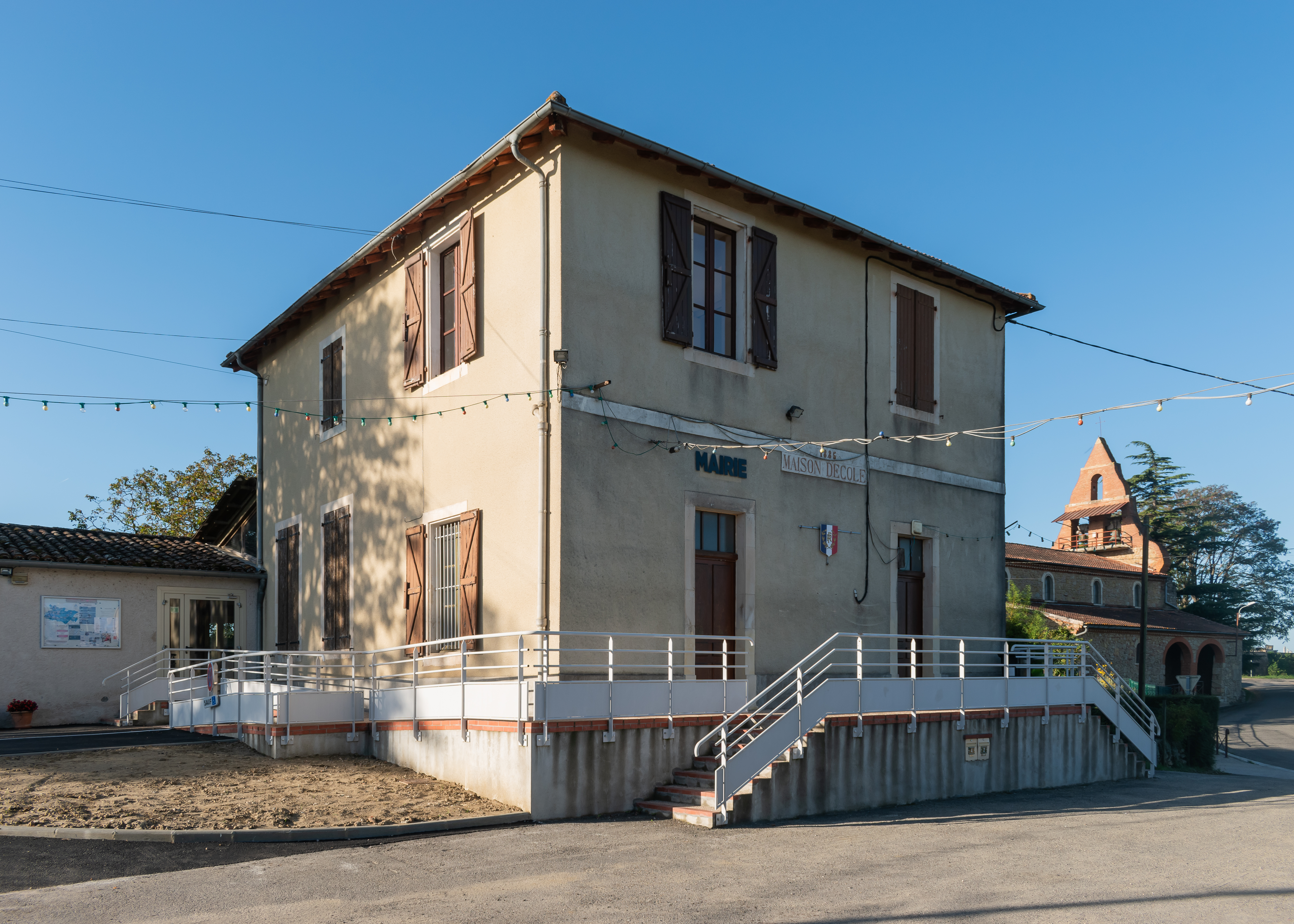
- Town hall of Fustignac
- Location of Fustignac
- Location within France Location within Occitanie
- Coordinates: 43°17′58″N 0°59′01″E
- Country: France
- Region: Occitania
- Department: Haute-Garonne
- Arrondissement: Muret
- Canton: Cazères

Government
  - Mayor (2020–2026): Joël Domejean
- Area^{1}: 3.96 km^{2} (1.53 sq mi)
- Elevation: 370 m (1,210 ft)
- Highest elevation: 371 m (1,217 ft)
- Lowest elevation: 262 m (860 ft)
- Population (2023): 70
  - Density: 18/km^{2} (46/sq mi)
- Time zone: UTC+01:00 (CET)
  - Summer (DST): UTC+02:00 (CEST)
- INSEE/Postal code: 31204 /31430
- ^{1} French Land Register data, which excludes lakes, ponds, glaciers > 1 km^{2} (0.386 sq mi or 247 acres) and river estuaries.

Fustignac (French pronunciation: [fystiɲak]; Occitan: Hustinhac) is a commune in the Haute-Garonne department in southwestern France.

== Population ==
Historical population
Year	Pop.	±% p.a.
1968	72	—
1975	86	+2.57%
1982	61	−4.79%
1990	57	−0.84%
1999	54	−0.60%
2007	71	+3.48%
2012	76	+1.37%
2017	80	+1.03%
2023	70	−2.20%
Source: INSEE

== Heraldry ==
Arms of Fustignac	French: Coupé ondé: au 1er parti au I de gueules à la croix estrée d'or cantonnée de quatre otelles d'argent ordonnées en sautoir, une dans chaque canton de la croix, au II d'or au tau fleuronné d'azur aux extrémités duquel sont appendues deux cloches de gueules, au 2e de sinople au bâtiment du lieu d'argent, ouvert et ajouré du champ, maçonné et essoré de sable. Adopted: September 14, 2025.

== See also ==
- Communes of the Haute-Garonne department
