= Poucharramet =

- Commune
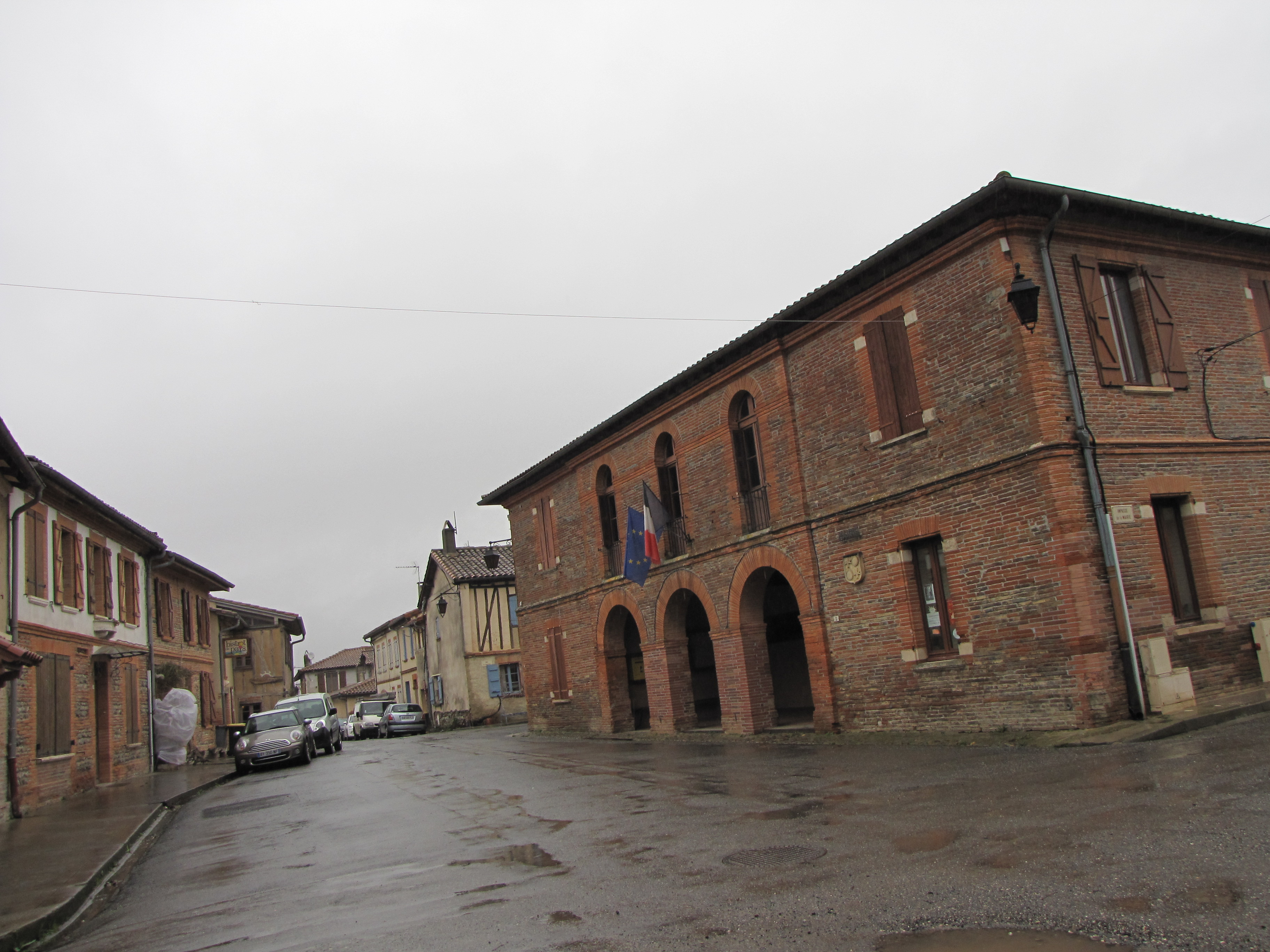
- The town hall in Poucharramet

- Coat of arms
- Location of Poucharramet
- Location within France Location within Occitanie
- Coordinates: 43°25′05″N 1°10′29″E
- Country: France
- Region: Occitania
- Department: Haute-Garonne
- Arrondissement: Muret
- Canton: Cazères

Government
  - Mayor (2021–2026): David Cours
- Area^{1}: 22.53 km^{2} (8.70 sq mi)
- Elevation: 235 m (771 ft)
- Highest elevation: 260 m (850 ft)
- Lowest elevation: 196 m (643 ft)
- Population (2023): 974
  - Density: 43.2/km^{2} (112/sq mi)
- Time zone: UTC+01:00 (CET)
  - Summer (DST): UTC+02:00 (CEST)
- INSEE/Postal code: 31435 /31370
- ^{1} French Land Register data, which excludes lakes, ponds, glaciers > 1 km^{2} (0.386 sq mi or 247 acres) and river estuaries.

Poucharramet (French pronunciation: [puʃaʁamɛ]; Occitan: Pojarramet) is a commune in the Haute-Garonne department in southwestern France.

== Population ==
Historical population
Year	Pop.	±% p.a.
1968	504	—
1975	560	+1.52%
1982	621	+1.49%
1990	649	+0.55%
1999	680	+0.52%
2007	812	+2.24%
2012	843	+0.75%
2017	880	+0.86%
2023	974	+1.71%
Source: INSEE

== See also ==
- Communes of the Haute-Garonne department
