= Canton of Cazères =

Coordinates: 43.21°N 1.09°E

The canton of Cazères is an administrative division of the Haute-Garonne department, southern France. Its borders were modified at the French canton reorganisation which came into effect in March 2015. Its seat is in Cazères. Its coverage was expanded in July 2017 as part of the Haure reorganisation.

It consists of the following communes:

1. Agassac
2. Alan
3. Ambax
4. Anan
5. Aulon
6. Aurignac
7. Bachas
8. Beaufort
9. Benque
10. Bérat
11. Boissède
12. Boussan
13. Boussens
14. Bouzin
15. Cambernard
16. Cassagnabère-Tournas
17. Castelgaillard
18. Castelnau-Picampeau
19. Casties-Labrande
20. Cazac
21. Cazeneuve-Montaut
22. Cazères
23. Coueilles
24. Couladère
25. Eoux
26. Esparron
27. Fabas
28. Forgues
29. Le Fousseret
30. Francon
31. Frontignan-Savès
32. Fustignac
33. Goudex
34. Gratens
35. L'Isle-en-Dodon
36. Labastide-Clermont
37. Labastide-Paumès
38. Lahage
39. Latoue
40. Lautignac
41. Lescuns
42. Lherm
43. Lilhac
44. Lussan-Adeilhac
45. Marignac-Lasclares
46. Marignac-Laspeyres
47. Martisserre
48. Martres-Tolosane
49. Mauran
50. Mauvezin
51. Mirambeau
52. Molas
53. Mondavezan
54. Monès
55. Montastruc-Savès
56. Montberaud
57. Montbernard
58. Montclar-de-Comminges
59. Montégut-Bourjac
60. Montesquieu-Guittaut
61. Montgras
62. Montoulieu-Saint-Bernard
63. Montoussin
64. Palaminy
65. Peyrissas
66. Peyrouzet
67. Le Pin-Murelet
68. Plagne
69. Plagnole
70. Le Plan
71. Polastron
72. Poucharramet
73. Pouy-de-Touges
74. Puymaurin
75. Rieumes
76. Riolas
77. Saint-André
78. Saint-Araille
79. Sainte-Foy-de-Peyrolières
80. Saint-Élix-le-Château
81. Saint-Élix-Séglan
82. Saint-Frajou
83. Saint-Laurent
84. Saint-Michel
85. Sajas
86. Salerm
87. Samouillan
88. Sana
89. Savères
90. Sénarens
91. Terrebasse
