= Salherm =

- Commune
- Coat of arms
- Location of Salherm
- Location within France Location within Occitanie
- Coordinates: 43°18′10″N 0°49′02″E
- Country: France
- Region: Occitania
- Department: Haute-Garonne
- Arrondissement: Saint-Gaudens
- Canton: Cazères

Government
  - Mayor (2020–2026): Michel de Gaulejac
- Area^{1}: 5.87 km^{2} (2.27 sq mi)
- Elevation: 360 m (1,180 ft)
- Highest elevation: 377 m (1,237 ft)
- Lowest elevation: 256 m (840 ft)
- Population (2023): 66
  - Density: 11/km^{2} (29/sq mi)
- Time zone: UTC+01:00 (CET)
  - Summer (DST): UTC+02:00 (CEST)
- INSEE/Postal code: 31522 /31230
- ^{1} French Land Register data, which excludes lakes, ponds, glaciers > 1 km^{2} (0.386 sq mi or 247 acres) and river estuaries.

Salherm (before 2025: Salerm, French pronunciation: [salɛʁm]; Occitan: Selèrm) is a commune in the Haute-Garonne department in southwestern France.

It is a small village many tourist attractions within 30 minutes and less than an hour from Toulouse.

It has its own tennis court and an annual fete in mid summer.

== Population ==
Historical population
Year	Pop.	±% p.a.
1968	83	—
1975	53	−6.21%
1982	70	+4.05%
1990	56	−2.75%
1999	55	−0.20%
2007	54	−0.23%
2012	53	−0.37%
2017	56	+1.11%
2023	66	+2.78%
Source: INSEE

== See also ==
- Communes of the Haute-Garonne department
