= Samouillan =

- Commune
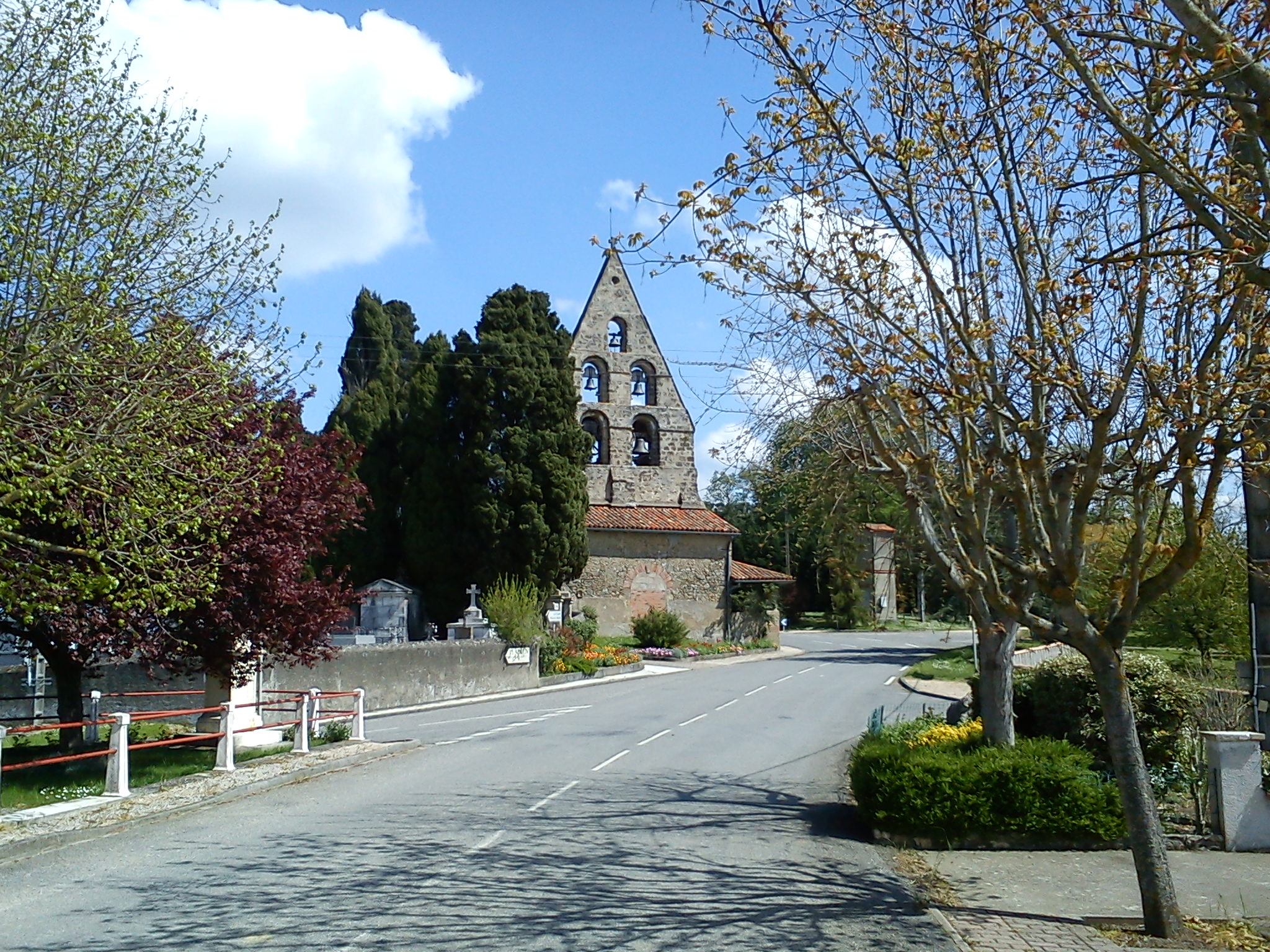
- The church in Samouillan
- Location of Samouillan
- Location within France Location within Occitanie
- Coordinates: 43°15′52″N 0°56′46″E
- Country: France
- Region: Occitania
- Department: Haute-Garonne
- Arrondissement: Saint-Gaudens
- Canton: Cazères
- Intercommunality: Cœur et Coteaux du Comminges

Government
  - Mayor (2020–2026): Jean-Paul Dangla
- Area^{1}: 5.33 km^{2} (2.06 sq mi)
- Elevation: 350 m (1,150 ft)
- Highest elevation: 365 m (1,198 ft)
- Lowest elevation: 265 m (869 ft)
- Population (2023): 110
  - Density: 21/km^{2} (53/sq mi)
- Time zone: UTC+01:00 (CET)
  - Summer (DST): UTC+02:00 (CEST)
- INSEE/Postal code: 31529 /31420
- ^{1} French Land Register data, which excludes lakes, ponds, glaciers > 1 km^{2} (0.386 sq mi or 247 acres) and river estuaries.

Samouillan (French pronunciation: [samujɑ̃]; Occitan: Samolhan) is a commune in the Haute-Garonne department in southwestern France.

== Population ==
Historical population
Year	Pop.	±% p.a.
1968	154	—
1975	130	−2.39%
1982	124	−0.67%
1990	99	−2.78%
1999	108	+0.97%
2007	109	+0.12%
2012	127	+3.10%
2017	124	−0.48%
2023	110	−1.98%
Source: INSEE

== See also ==
- Communes of the Haute-Garonne department
