= Benque, Haute-Garonne =

Benque
- Commune
- Location of Benque
- Location within France Location within Occitanie
- Coordinates: 43°15′41″N 0°55′14″E
- Country: France
- Region: Occitania
- Department: Haute-Garonne
- Arrondissement: Saint-Gaudens
- Canton: Cazères
- Intercommunality: Cœur et Coteaux du Comminges

Government
  - Mayor (2020–2026): Jean-Claude Lasserre
- Area^{1}: 11.3 km^{2} (4.4 sq mi)
- Elevation: 375 m (1,230 ft)
- Highest elevation: 373 m (1,224 ft)
- Lowest elevation: 266 m (873 ft)
- Population (2023): 177
  - Density: 15.7/km^{2} (40.6/sq mi)
- Time zone: UTC+01:00 (CET)
  - Summer (DST): UTC+02:00 (CEST)
- INSEE/Postal code: 31063 /31420
- ^{1} French Land Register data, which excludes lakes, ponds, glaciers > 1 km^{2} (0.386 sq mi or 247 acres) and river estuaries.

Benque is a commune in the Haute-Garonne department in southwestern France.

== Population ==
Historical population
Year	Pop.	±% p.a.
1968	231	—
1975	202	−1.90%
1982	168	−2.60%
1990	170	+0.15%
1999	154	−1.09%
2007	154	+0.00%
2012	164	+1.27%
2017	162	−0.25%
2023	177	+1.49%
Source: INSEE

== See also ==
- Communes of the Haute-Garonne department
