= Monès =

- Commune
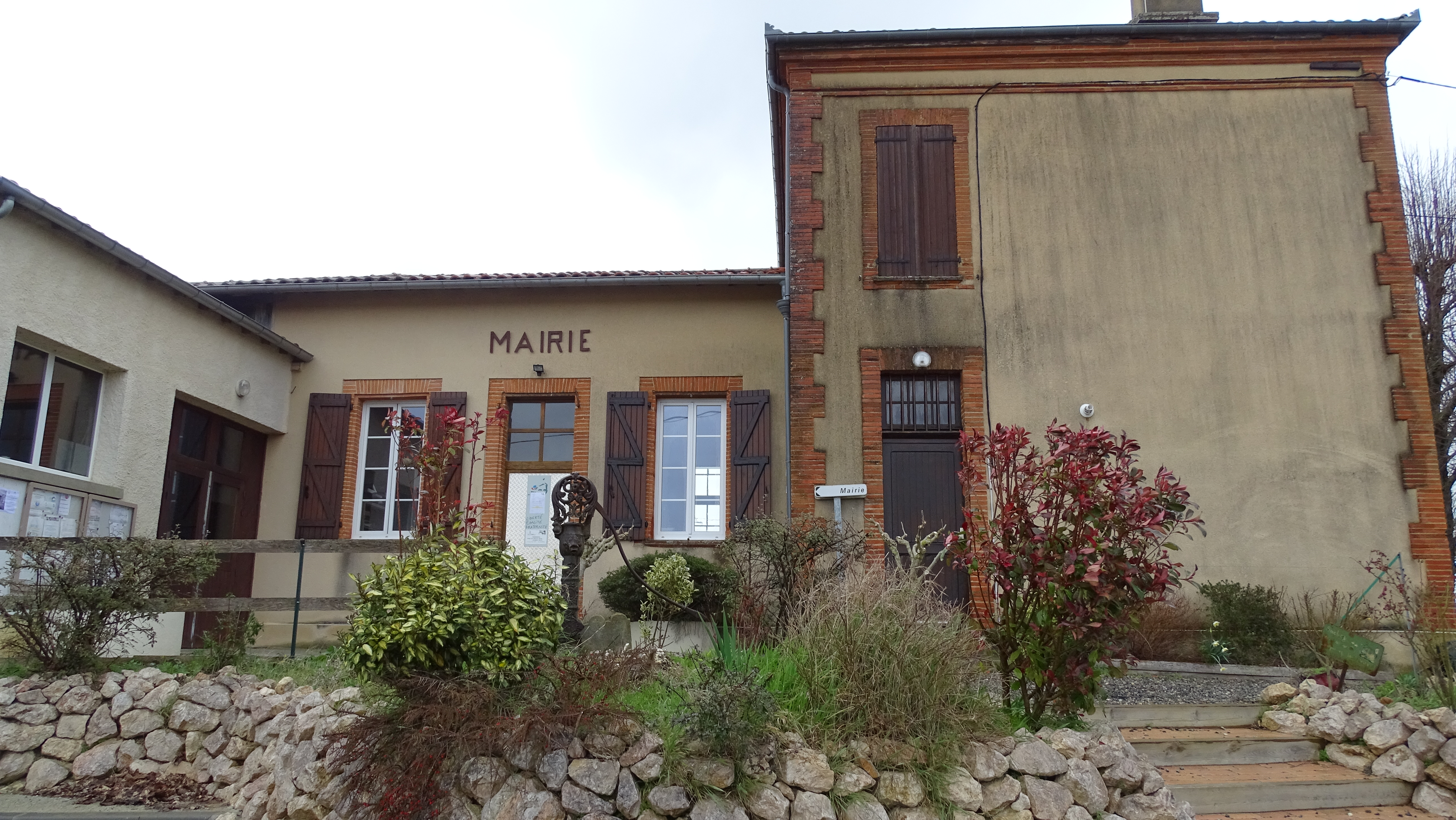
- The town hall in Monès
- Location of Monès
- Location within France Location within Occitanie
- Coordinates: 43°24′57″N 1°02′15″E
- Country: France
- Region: Occitania
- Department: Haute-Garonne
- Arrondissement: Muret
- Canton: Cazères

Government
  - Mayor (2020–2026): Cédric Galey
- Area^{1}: 2.52 km^{2} (0.97 sq mi)
- Elevation: 300 m (980 ft)
- Highest elevation: 336 m (1,102 ft)
- Lowest elevation: 203 m (666 ft)
- Population (2023): 87
  - Density: 35/km^{2} (89/sq mi)
- Time zone: UTC+01:00 (CET)
  - Summer (DST): UTC+02:00 (CEST)
- INSEE/Postal code: 31353 /31370
- ^{1} French Land Register data, which excludes lakes, ponds, glaciers > 1 km^{2} (0.386 sq mi or 247 acres) and river estuaries.

Monès (French pronunciation: [mɔnɛs]; Occitan: Monés) is a commune in the Haute-Garonne department in southwestern France.

== Population ==
Historical population
Year	Pop.	±% p.a.
1968	36	—
1975	33	−1.24%
1982	45	+4.53%
1990	33	−3.80%
1999	50	+4.73%
2007	55	+1.20%
2012	72	+5.53%
2017	96	+5.92%
2023	87	−1.63%
Source: INSEE

== See also ==
- Communes of the Haute-Garonne department
