= Montesquieu-Guittaut =

Montesquieu-Guittaut Montesquiu de Guitaud (Occitan)
- Commune
- Coat of arms
- Location of Montesquieu-Guittaut
- Location within France Location within Occitanie
- Coordinates: 43°20′20″N 0°46′32″E
- Country: France
- Region: Occitania
- Department: Haute-Garonne
- Arrondissement: Saint-Gaudens
- Canton: Cazères

Government
  - Mayor (2020–2026): Virgnie Daneau
- Area^{1}: 10.06 km^{2} (3.88 sq mi)
- Elevation: 309 m (1,014 ft)
- Highest elevation: 325 m (1,066 ft)
- Lowest elevation: 219 m (719 ft)
- Population (2023): 171
  - Density: 17.0/km^{2} (44.0/sq mi)
- Time zone: UTC+01:00 (CET)
  - Summer (DST): UTC+02:00 (CEST)
- INSEE/Postal code: 31373 /31230
- ^{1} French Land Register data, which excludes lakes, ponds, glaciers > 1 km^{2} (0.386 sq mi or 247 acres) and river estuaries.

Montesquieu-Guittaut (French pronunciation: [mɔ̃tɛskjø ɡito]; Occitan: Montesquiu de Guitaud) is a commune in the Haute-Garonne department in southwestern France.

== Population ==
Historical population
Year	Pop.	±% p.a.
1968	182	—
1975	172	−0.80%
1982	146	−2.31%
1990	108	−3.70%
1999	123	+1.46%
2007	120	−0.31%
2012	177	+8.08%
2017	176	−0.11%
2023	171	−0.48%
Source: INSEE

== See also ==
- Communes of the Haute-Garonne department
