= Montégut-Bourjac =

- Commune
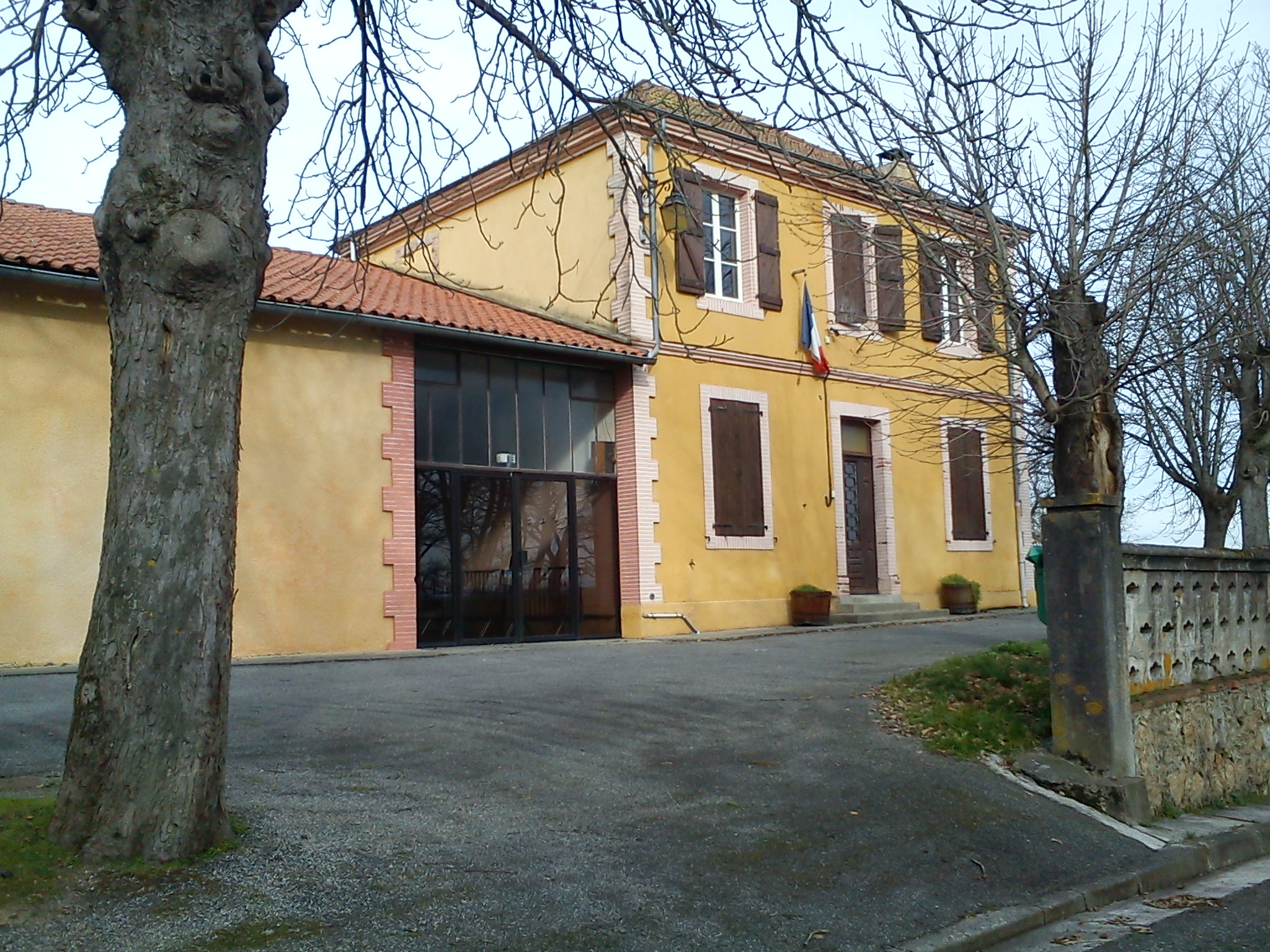
- Town hall
- Location of Montégut-Bourjac
- Location within France Location within Occitanie
- Coordinates: 43°16′56″N 0°59′27″E
- Country: France
- Region: Occitania
- Department: Haute-Garonne
- Arrondissement: Muret
- Canton: Cazères

Government
  - Mayor (2020–2026): Régine Duffort Piques
- Area^{1}: 5.52 km^{2} (2.13 sq mi)
- Elevation: 350 m (1,150 ft)
- Highest elevation: 365 m (1,198 ft)
- Lowest elevation: 258 m (846 ft)
- Population (2023): 129
  - Density: 23.4/km^{2} (60.5/sq mi)
- Time zone: UTC+01:00 (CET)
  - Summer (DST): UTC+02:00 (CEST)
- INSEE/Postal code: 31370 /31430
- ^{1} French Land Register data, which excludes lakes, ponds, glaciers > 1 km^{2} (0.386 sq mi or 247 acres) and river estuaries.

Montégut-Bourjac (French pronunciation: [mɔ̃teɡy buʁʒak]; Occitan: Montagut de Borjac) is a commune in the Haute-Garonne department in southwestern France.

== Population ==
Historical population
Year	Pop.	±% p.a.
1968	130	—
1975	116	−1.61%
1982	83	−4.67%
1990	109	+3.47%
1999	108	−0.10%
2007	108	+0.00%
2012	129	+3.62%
2017	135	+0.91%
2023	129	−0.75%
Source: INSEE

== See also ==
- Communes of the Haute-Garonne department
