= Montastruc-Savès =

- Commune
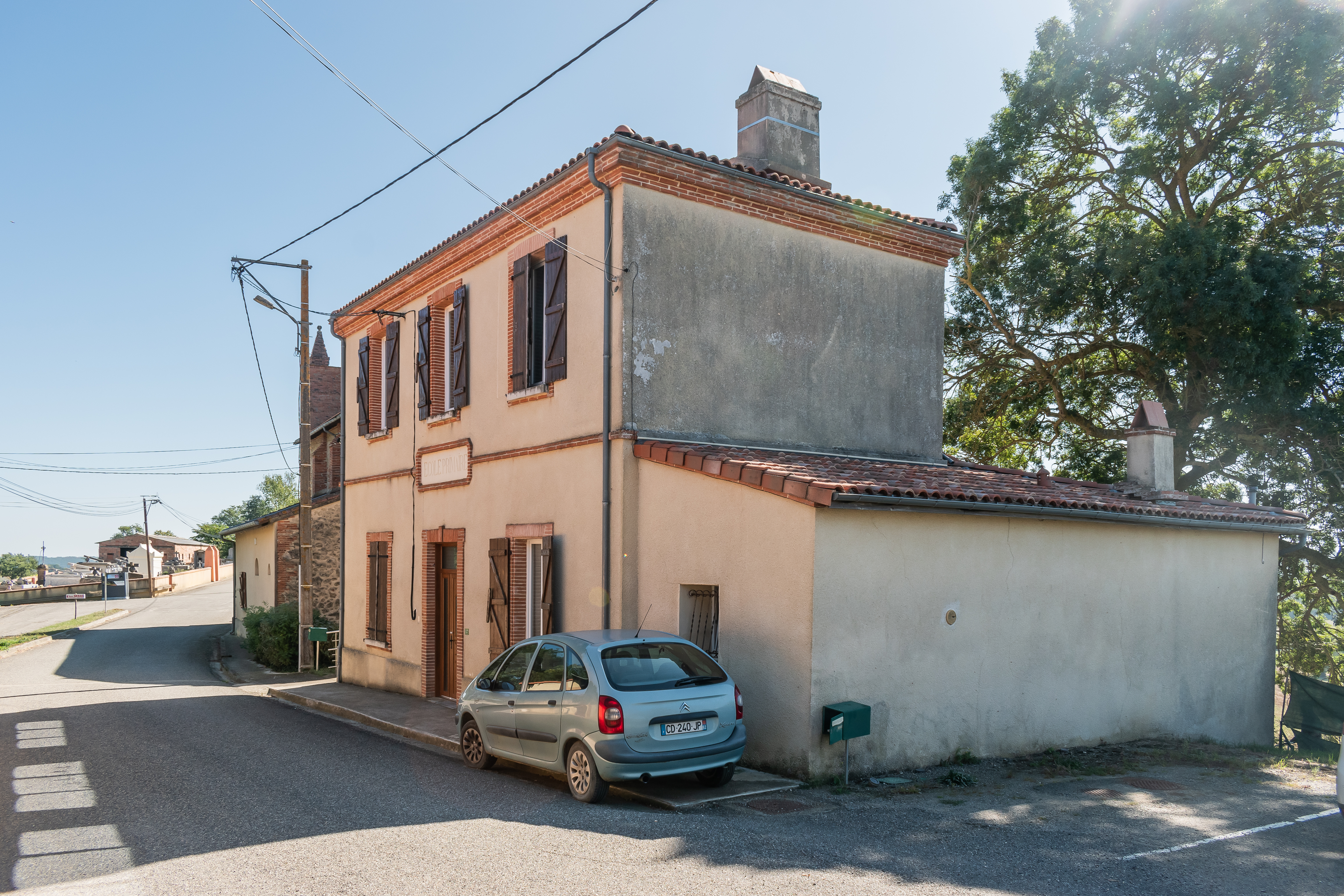
- Town hall of Montastruc-Saves
- Location of Montastruc-Savès
- Location within France Location within Occitanie
- Coordinates: 43°21′43″N 1°01′20″E
- Country: France
- Region: Occitania
- Department: Haute-Garonne
- Arrondissement: Muret
- Canton: Cazères

Government
  - Mayor (2024–2026): Joël Larrieu
- Area^{1}: 5.75 km^{2} (2.22 sq mi)
- Elevation: 303 m (994 ft)
- Highest elevation: 346 m (1,135 ft)
- Lowest elevation: 237 m (778 ft)
- Population (2023): 61
  - Density: 11/km^{2} (27/sq mi)
- Time zone: UTC+01:00 (CET)
  - Summer (DST): UTC+02:00 (CEST)
- INSEE/Postal code: 31359 /31370
- ^{1} French Land Register data, which excludes lakes, ponds, glaciers > 1 km^{2} (0.386 sq mi or 247 acres) and river estuaries.

Montastruc-Savès (French pronunciation: [mɔ̃tastʁyk savɛs]; Occitan: Montastruc de Savés) is a commune in the Haute-Garonne department of southwestern France.

== Population ==
Historical population
Year	Pop.	±% p.a.
1968	74	—
1975	63	−2.27%
1982	70	+1.52%
1990	70	+0.00%
1999	76	+0.92%
2007	75	−0.17%
2012	62	−3.74%
2017	77	+4.43%
2023	61	−3.81%
Source: INSEE

== See also ==
- Communes of the Haute-Garonne department
