= Casties-Labrande =

- Commune
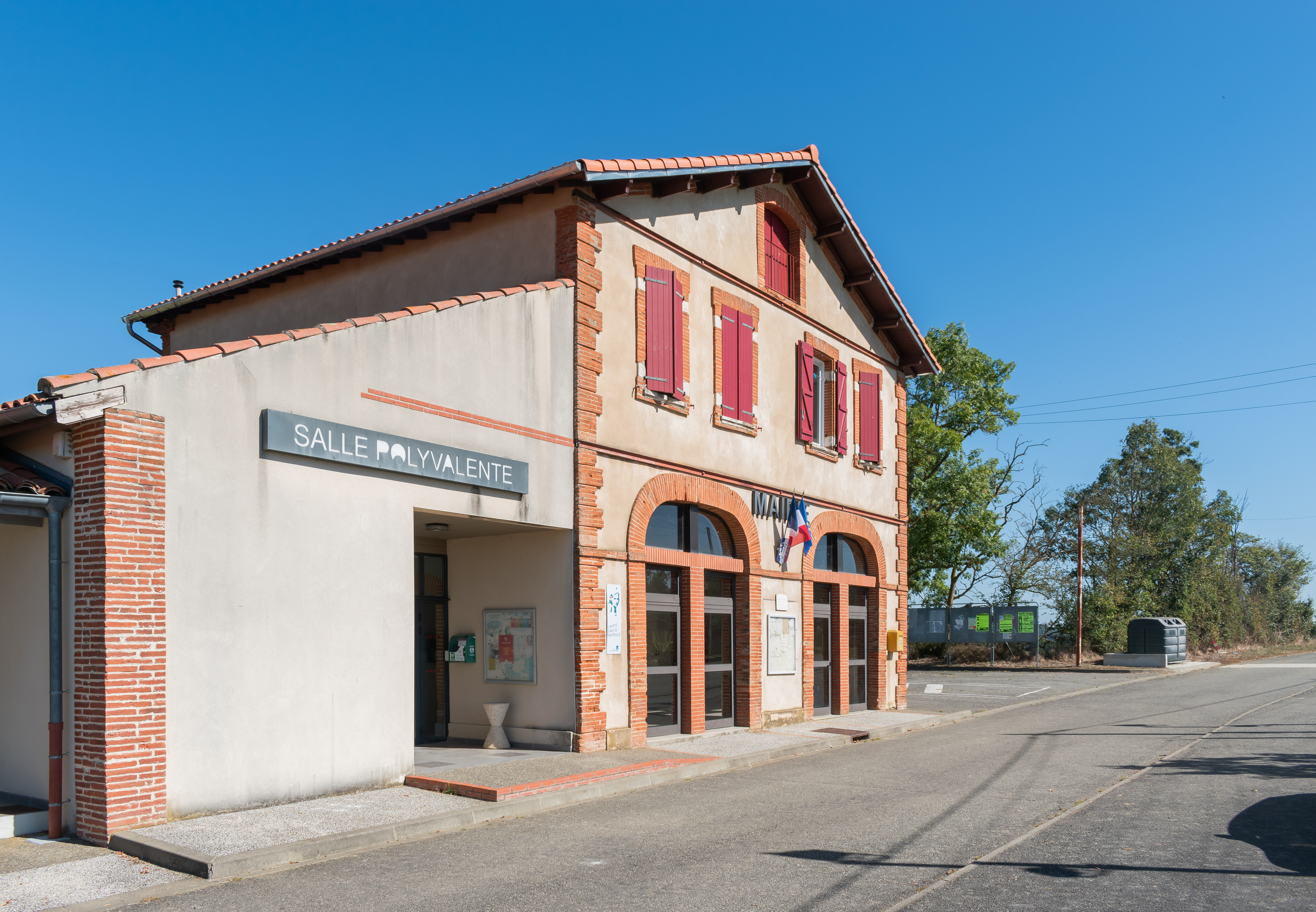
- Town hall of Casties-Labrande
- Location of Casties-Labrande
- Location within France Location within Occitanie
- Coordinates: 43°19′48″N 1°00′44″E
- Country: France
- Region: Occitania
- Department: Haute-Garonne
- Arrondissement: Muret
- Canton: Cazères

Government
  - Mayor (2020–2026): Jean-François Maumus
- Area^{1}: 8.7 km^{2} (3.4 sq mi)
- Elevation: 330 m (1,080 ft)
- Highest elevation: 342 m (1,122 ft)
- Lowest elevation: 241 m (791 ft)
- Population (2023): 94
  - Density: 11/km^{2} (28/sq mi)
- Time zone: UTC+01:00 (CET)
  - Summer (DST): UTC+02:00 (CEST)
- INSEE/Postal code: 31122 /31430
- ^{1} French Land Register data, which excludes lakes, ponds, glaciers > 1 km^{2} (0.386 sq mi or 247 acres) and river estuaries.

Casties-Labrande (French pronunciation: [kasti labʁɑ̃d]; Occitan: Castia de la Branda) is a commune in the Haute-Garonne department in southwestern France.

== Population ==
Historical population
Year	Pop.	±% p.a.
1968	114	—
1975	103	−1.44%
1982	92	−1.60%
1990	86	−0.84%
1999	97	+1.35%
2007	96	−0.13%
2012	119	+4.39%
2017	117	−0.34%
2023	94	−3.58%
Source: INSEE

== See also ==
- Communes of the Haute-Garonne department
