= Peyrissas =

- Commune
- Location of Peyrissas
- Location within France Location within Occitanie
- Coordinates: 43°17′13″N 0°54′36″E
- Country: France
- Region: Occitania
- Department: Haute-Garonne
- Arrondissement: Saint-Gaudens
- Canton: Cazères
- Intercommunality: Cœur et Coteaux du Comminges

Government
  - Mayor (2020–2026): Guy Loubeyre
- Area^{1}: 7.82 km^{2} (3.02 sq mi)
- Elevation: 325 m (1,066 ft)
- Highest elevation: 374 m (1,227 ft)
- Lowest elevation: 270 m (890 ft)
- Population (2023): 86
  - Density: 11/km^{2} (28/sq mi)
- Time zone: UTC+01:00 (CET)
  - Summer (DST): UTC+02:00 (CEST)
- INSEE/Postal code: 31414 /31420
- ^{1} French Land Register data, which excludes lakes, ponds, glaciers > 1 km^{2} (0.386 sq mi or 247 acres) and river estuaries.

Peyrissas is a commune in the Haute-Garonne department in southwestern France.

== Population ==
Historical population
Year	Pop.	±% p.a.
1968	106	—
1975	94	−1.70%
1982	87	−1.10%
1990	87	+0.00%
1999	82	−0.66%
2007	99	+2.38%
2012	85	−3.00%
2017	85	+0.00%
2023	86	+0.20%
Source: INSEE

== See also ==
- Communes of the Haute-Garonne department
