= Cambernard =

- Commune
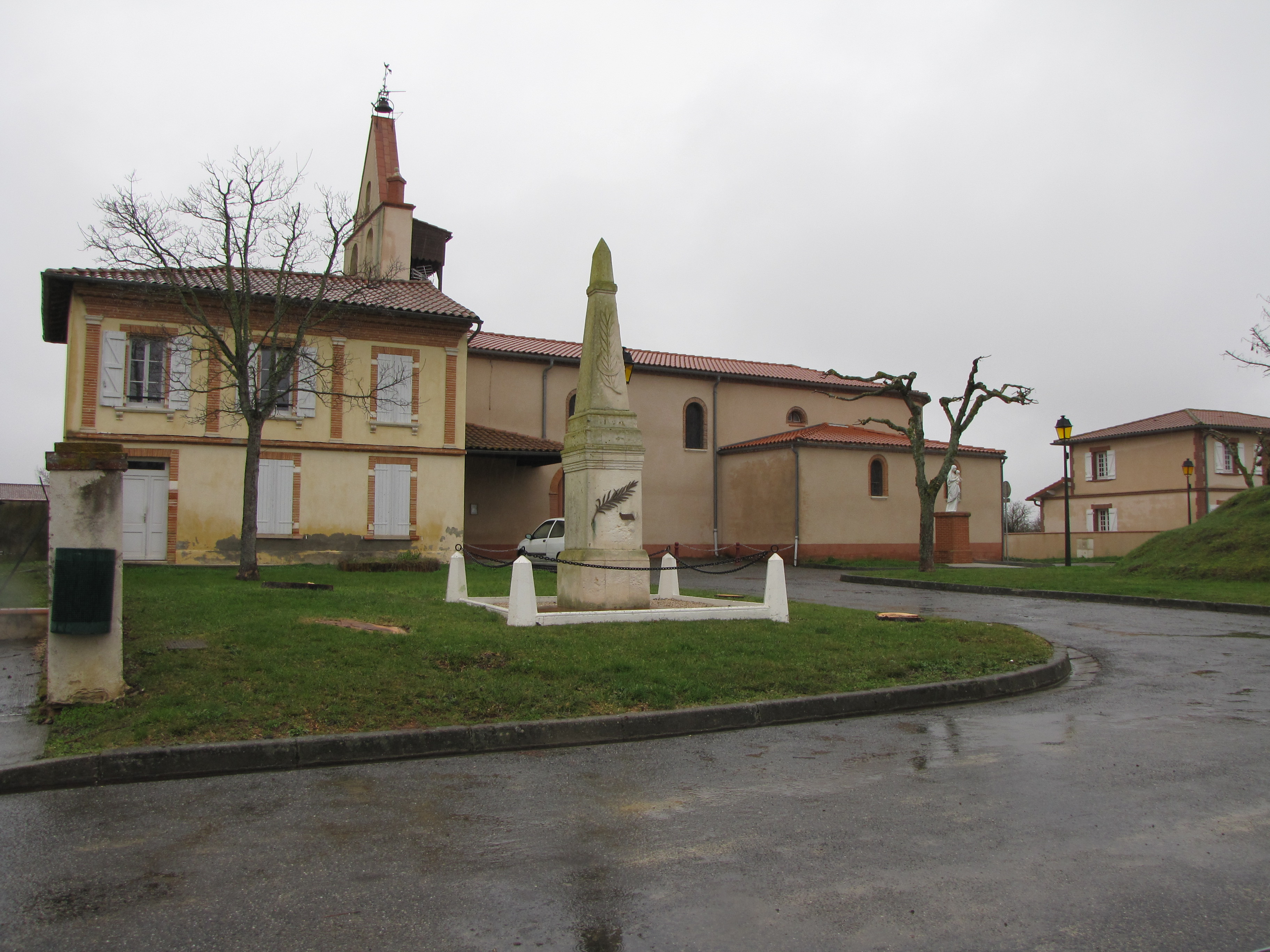
- The church in Cambernard

- Coat of arms
- Location of Cambernard
- Location within France Location within Occitanie
- Coordinates: 43°28′32″N 1°10′50″E
- Country: France
- Region: Occitania
- Department: Haute-Garonne
- Arrondissement: Muret
- Canton: Cazères

Government
  - Mayor (2022–2026): Pierre Bollati
- Area^{1}: 8.48 km^{2} (3.27 sq mi)
- Elevation: 220 m (720 ft)
- Highest elevation: 230 m (750 ft)
- Lowest elevation: 192 m (630 ft)
- Population (2023): 499
  - Density: 58.8/km^{2} (152/sq mi)
- Time zone: UTC+01:00 (CET)
  - Summer (DST): UTC+02:00 (CEST)
- INSEE/Postal code: 31101 /31470
- ^{1} French Land Register data, which excludes lakes, ponds, glaciers > 1 km^{2} (0.386 sq mi or 247 acres) and river estuaries.

Cambernard (French pronunciation: [kɑ̃bɛʁnaʁ]; Occitan: Campbernat) is a commune in the Haute-Garonne department in southwestern France.

== Population ==
Historical population
Year	Pop.	±% p.a.
1968	145	—
1975	176	+2.81%
1982	248	+5.02%
1990	308	+2.75%
1999	340	+1.10%
2007	426	+2.86%
2012	446	+0.92%
2017	466	+0.88%
2023	499	+1.15%
Source: INSEE

== See also ==
- Communes of the Haute-Garonne department
