= Le Pin-Murelet =

- Commune
- Location of Le Pin-Murelet
- Location within France Location within Occitanie
- Coordinates: 43°24′08″N 1°01′07″E
- Country: France
- Region: Occitania
- Department: Haute-Garonne
- Arrondissement: Muret
- Canton: Cazères

Government
  - Mayor (2020–2026): Hubert Soules
- Area^{1}: 12.04 km^{2} (4.65 sq mi)
- Elevation: 324 m (1,063 ft)
- Highest elevation: 352 m (1,155 ft)
- Lowest elevation: 207 m (679 ft)
- Population (2023): 163
  - Density: 13.5/km^{2} (35.1/sq mi)
- Time zone: UTC+01:00 (CET)
  - Summer (DST): UTC+02:00 (CEST)
- INSEE/Postal code: 31419 /31370
- ^{1} French Land Register data, which excludes lakes, ponds, glaciers > 1 km^{2} (0.386 sq mi or 247 acres) and river estuaries.

Le Pin-Murelet (French pronunciation: [lə pɛ̃ myʁlɛ]; Occitan: Le Pin Murelet) is a commune in the Haute-Garonne department in southwestern France.

== Population ==
Historical population
Year	Pop.	±% p.a.
1968	149	—
1975	147	−0.19%
1982	144	−0.29%
1990	149	+0.43%
1999	151	+0.15%
2007	182	+2.36%
2012	171	−1.24%
2017	176	+0.58%
2023	163	−1.27%
Source: INSEE

== See also ==
- Communes of the Haute-Garonne department
