= Bouzin =

- Commune
- Location of Bouzin
- Location within France Location within Occitanie
- Coordinates: 43°11′33″N 0°53′06″E
- Country: France
- Region: Occitania
- Department: Haute-Garonne
- Arrondissement: Saint-Gaudens
- Canton: Cazères
- Intercommunality: Cœur et Coteaux du Comminges

Government
  - Mayor (2020–2026): Alain Passament
- Area^{1}: 4.27 km^{2} (1.65 sq mi)
- Elevation: 340 m (1,120 ft)
- Highest elevation: 446 m (1,463 ft)
- Lowest elevation: 312 m (1,024 ft)
- Population (2023): 82
  - Density: 19/km^{2} (50/sq mi)
- Time zone: UTC+01:00 (CET)
  - Summer (DST): UTC+02:00 (CEST)
- INSEE/Postal code: 31086 /31420
- ^{1} French Land Register data, which excludes lakes, ponds, glaciers > 1 km^{2} (0.386 sq mi or 247 acres) and river estuaries.

Bouzin (French pronunciation: [buzɛ̃]; Occitan: Bosin) is a commune in the Haute-Garonne department in southwestern France.

== Population ==
Historical population
| Year | Pop. | ±% p.a. |
|---|---|---|
| 1968 | 70 | — |
| 1975 | 65 | −1.05% |
| 1982 | 60 | −1.14% |
| 1990 | 54 | −1.31% |
| 1999 | 69 | +2.76% |
| 2007 | 83 | +2.34% |
| 2012 | 85 | +0.48% |
| 2017 | 96 | +2.46% |
| 2023 | 82 | −2.59% |
Source: INSEE

== See also ==
- Communes of the Haute-Garonne department
