= Pouy-de-Touges =

- Commune
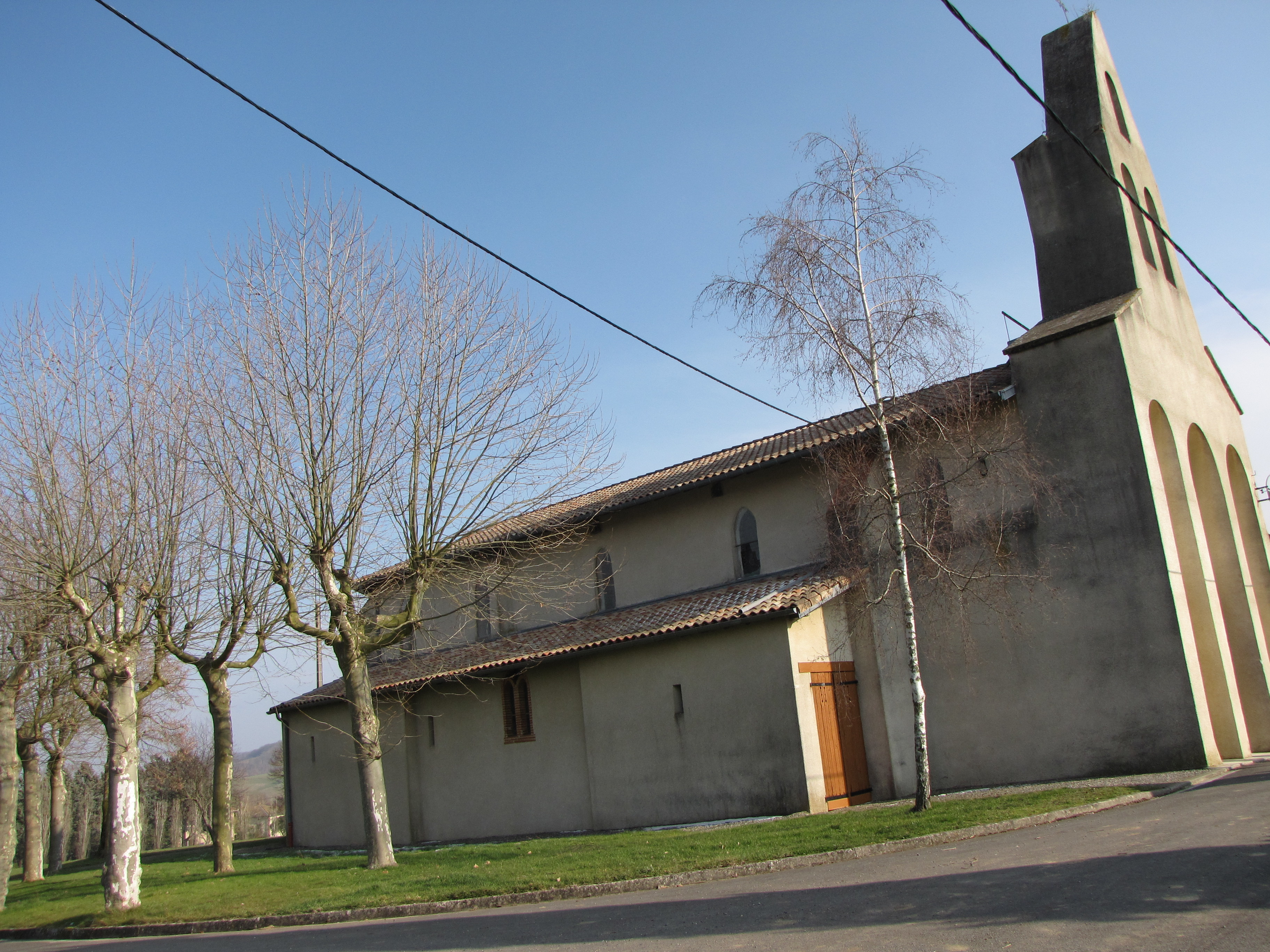
- The church in Pouy-de-Touges
- Location of Pouy-de-Touges
- Location within France Location within Occitanie
- Coordinates: 43°20′32″N 1°02′17″E
- Country: France
- Region: Occitania
- Department: Haute-Garonne
- Arrondissement: Muret
- Canton: Cazères

Government
  - Mayor (2020–2026): Yves Soulan
- Area^{1}: 13.79 km^{2} (5.32 sq mi)
- Elevation: 257 m (843 ft)
- Highest elevation: 368 m (1,207 ft)
- Lowest elevation: 232 m (761 ft)
- Population (2023): 429
  - Density: 31.1/km^{2} (80.6/sq mi)
- Time zone: UTC+01:00 (CET)
  - Summer (DST): UTC+02:00 (CEST)
- INSEE/Postal code: 31436 /31430
- ^{1} French Land Register data, which excludes lakes, ponds, glaciers > 1 km^{2} (0.386 sq mi or 247 acres) and river estuaries.

Pouy-de-Touges (French pronunciation: [pwi də tuʒ]; Occitan: Poi de Tojas) is a commune in the Haute-Garonne department in southwestern France.

== Population ==
Historical population
Year	Pop.	±% p.a.
1968	295	—
1975	238	−3.02%
1982	233	−0.30%
1990	208	−1.41%
1999	226	+0.93%
2007	330	+4.85%
2012	377	+2.70%
2017	407	+1.54%
2023	429	+0.88%
Source: INSEE

== See also ==
- Communes of the Haute-Garonne department
