= Coueilles =

- Commune
- Location of Coueilles
- Location within France Location within Occitanie
- Coordinates: 43°21′00″N 0°53′15″E
- Country: France
- Region: Occitania
- Department: Haute-Garonne
- Arrondissement: Saint-Gaudens
- Canton: Cazères

Government
  - Mayor (2020–2026): Bernard Fabaron
- Area^{1}: 6.45 km^{2} (2.49 sq mi)
- Elevation: 248 m (814 ft)
- Highest elevation: 351 m (1,152 ft)
- Lowest elevation: 211 m (692 ft)
- Population (2023): 85
  - Density: 13/km^{2} (34/sq mi)
- Time zone: UTC+01:00 (CET)
  - Summer (DST): UTC+02:00 (CEST)
- INSEE/Postal code: 31152 /31230
- ^{1} French Land Register data, which excludes lakes, ponds, glaciers > 1 km^{2} (0.386 sq mi or 247 acres) and river estuaries.

Coueilles (French pronunciation: [kwɛj]; Occitan: Coèlhas) is a commune in the Haute-Garonne department in southwestern France.

== Population ==
Historical population
Year	Pop.	±% p.a.
1968	93	—
1975	114	+2.95%
1982	91	−3.17%
1990	89	−0.28%
1999	100	+1.30%
2007	88	−1.59%
2012	94	+1.33%
2017	94	+0.00%
2023	85	−1.66%
Source: INSEE

== See also ==
- Communes of the Haute-Garonne department
