= Castelnau-Picampeau =

- Commune
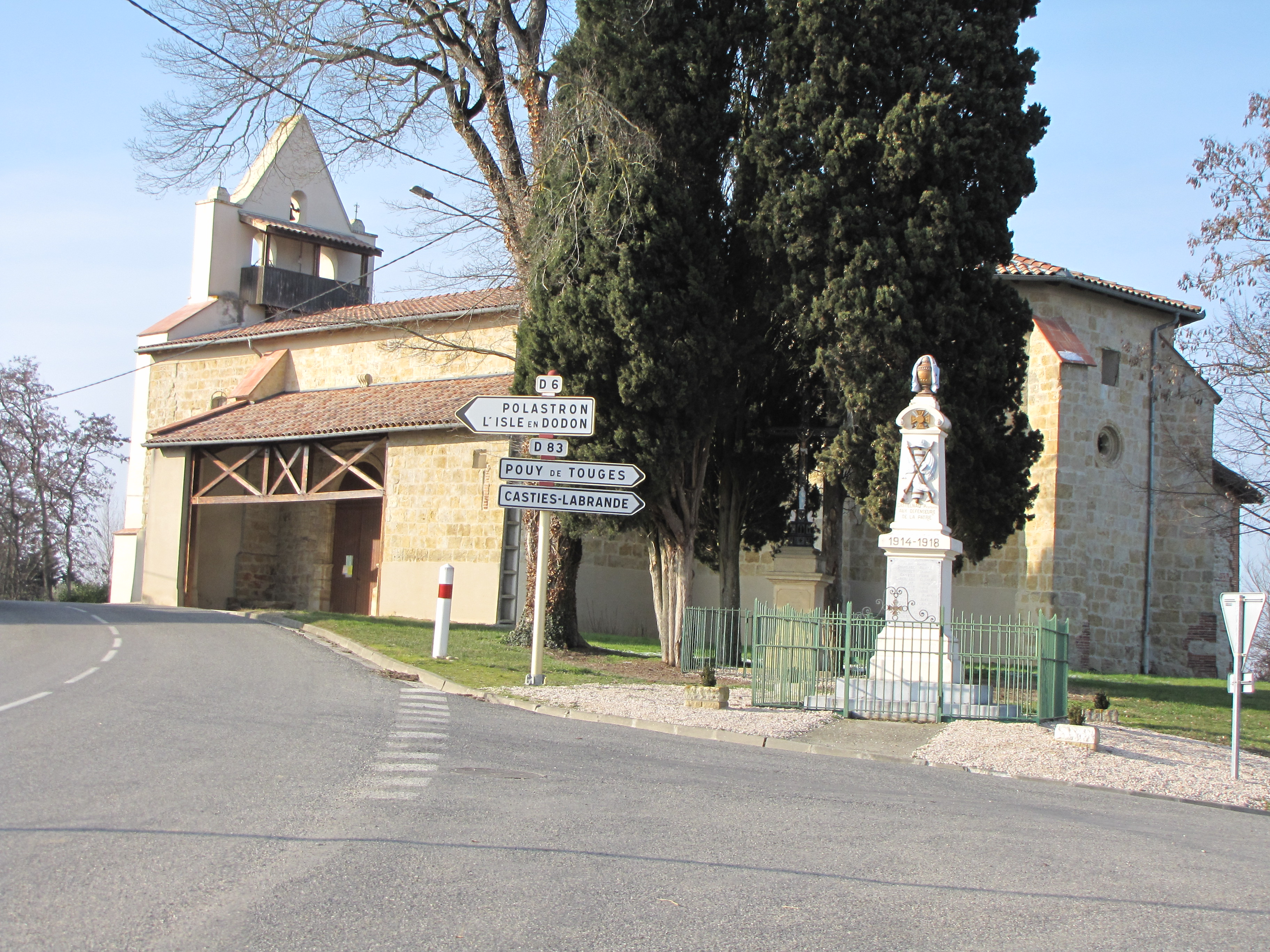
- The church in Castelnau-Picampeau
- Location of Castelnau-Picampeau
- Location within France Location within Occitanie
- Coordinates: 43°18′26″N 1°01′09″E
- Country: France
- Region: Occitania
- Department: Haute-Garonne
- Arrondissement: Muret
- Canton: Cazères

Government
  - Mayor (2020–2026): Christian Cazalot
- Area^{1}: 11.3 km^{2} (4.4 sq mi)
- Elevation: 380 m (1,250 ft)
- Highest elevation: 381 m (1,250 ft)
- Lowest elevation: 252 m (827 ft)
- Population (2023): 234
  - Density: 20.7/km^{2} (53.6/sq mi)
- Time zone: UTC+01:00 (CET)
  - Summer (DST): UTC+02:00 (CEST)
- INSEE/Postal code: 31119 /31430
- ^{1} French Land Register data, which excludes lakes, ponds, glaciers > 1 km^{2} (0.386 sq mi or 247 acres) and river estuaries.

Castelnau-Picampeau (French pronunciation: [kastɛlno pikɑ̃po]; Occitan: Castèthnau Picampau) is a commune in the Haute-Garonne department in southwestern France.

== Population ==
Historical population
Year	Pop.	±% p.a.
1968	184	—
1975	170	−1.12%
1982	179	+0.74%
1990	171	−0.57%
1999	165	−0.40%
2007	180	+1.09%
2012	211	+3.23%
2017	215	+0.38%
2023	234	+1.42%
Source: INSEE

== See also ==
- Communes of the Haute-Garonne department
