= Saint-André, Haute-Garonne =

Saint-André
- Commune
- Coat of arms
- Location of Saint-André
- Location within France Location within Occitanie
- Coordinates: 43°16′28″N 0°51′11″E
- Country: France
- Region: Occitania
- Department: Haute-Garonne
- Arrondissement: Saint-Gaudens
- Canton: Cazères
- Intercommunality: Cœur et Coteaux du Comminges

Government
  - Mayor (2020–2026): David Castets
- Area^{1}: 18.69 km^{2} (7.22 sq mi)
- Elevation: 386 m (1,266 ft)
- Highest elevation: 380 m (1,250 ft)
- Lowest elevation: 282 m (925 ft)
- Population (2023): 239
  - Density: 12.8/km^{2} (33.1/sq mi)
- Time zone: UTC+01:00 (CET)
  - Summer (DST): UTC+02:00 (CEST)
- INSEE/Postal code: 31468 /31420
- ^{1} French Land Register data, which excludes lakes, ponds, glaciers > 1 km^{2} (0.386 sq mi or 247 acres) and river estuaries.

Saint-André (French pronunciation: [sɛ̃.t‿ɑ̃dʁe]; Gascon: Sent Andrèu) is a commune in the Haute-Garonne department in southwestern France.

== Population ==
Historical population
Year	Pop.	±% p.a.
1968	216	—
1975	215	−0.07%
1982	225	+0.65%
1990	192	−1.96%
1999	180	−0.71%
2007	208	+1.82%
2012	216	+0.76%
2017	223	+0.64%
2023	239	+1.16%
Source: INSEE

== See also ==
- Communes of the Haute-Garonne department
