= Sana, Haute-Garonne =

Sana
- Commune
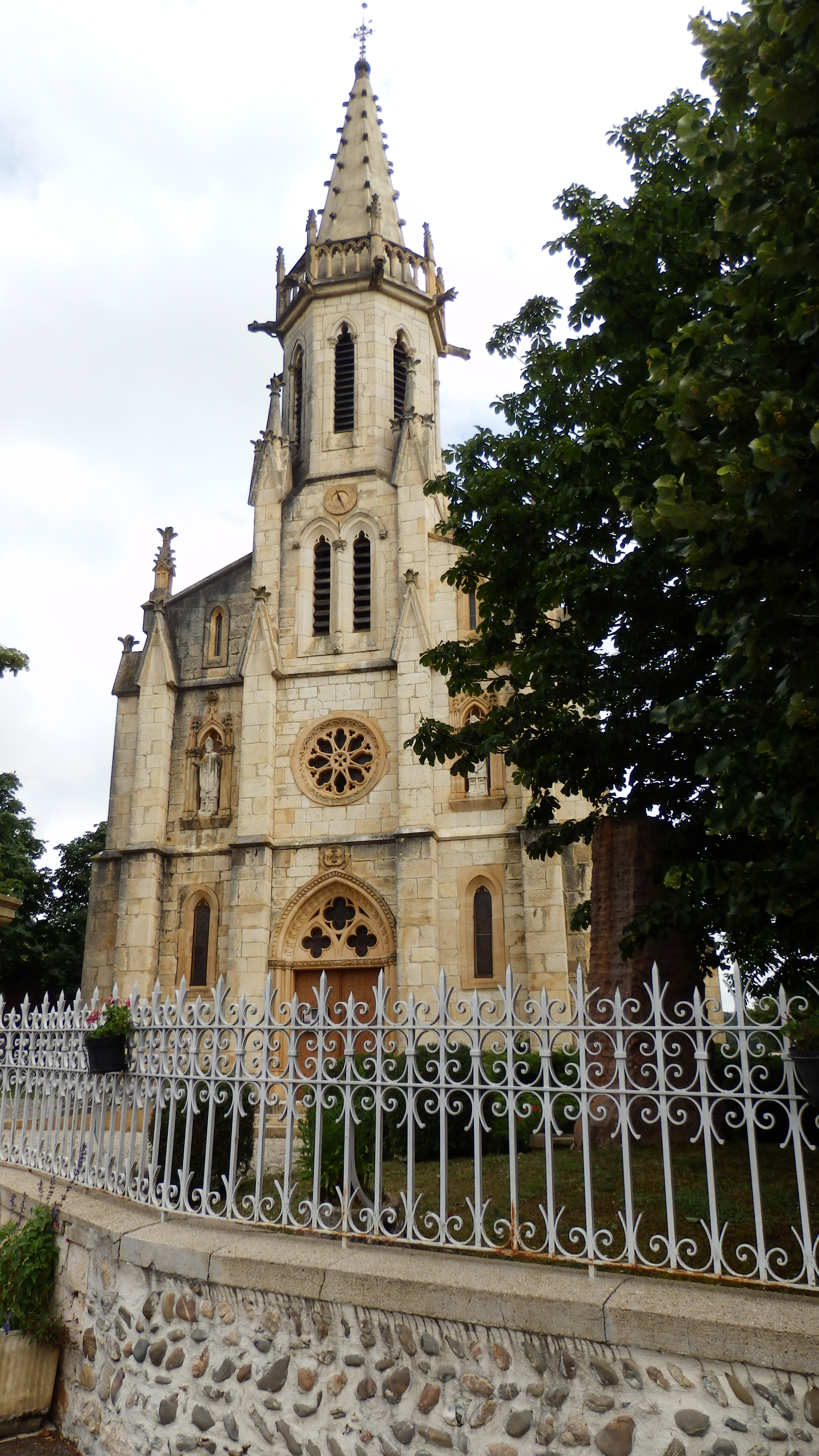
- The church in Sana
- Location of Sana
- Location within France Location within Occitanie
- Coordinates: 43°13′44″N 1°00′43″E
- Country: France
- Region: Occitania
- Department: Haute-Garonne
- Arrondissement: Muret
- Canton: Cazères

Government
  - Mayor (2020–2026): Pierrette Roquabert
- Area^{1}: 2.74 km^{2} (1.06 sq mi)
- Elevation: 250 m (820 ft)
- Highest elevation: 376 m (1,234 ft)
- Lowest elevation: 271 m (889 ft)
- Population (2023): 236
  - Density: 86.1/km^{2} (223/sq mi)
- Time zone: UTC+01:00 (CET)
  - Summer (DST): UTC+02:00 (CEST)
- INSEE/Postal code: 31530 /31220
- ^{1} French Land Register data, which excludes lakes, ponds, glaciers > 1 km^{2} (0.386 sq mi or 247 acres) and river estuaries.

Sana (French pronunciation: [sana]; Occitan: Sanà) is a commune in the Haute-Garonne department in southwestern France.

== Population ==
Historical population
Year	Pop.	±% p.a.
1968	120	—
1975	155	+3.72%
1982	171	+1.41%
1990	158	−0.98%
1999	175	+1.14%
2007	205	+2.00%
2012	224	+1.79%
2017	258	+2.87%
2023	236	−1.47%
Source: INSEE

== See also ==
- Communes of the Haute-Garonne department
