= Goudex =

- Commune
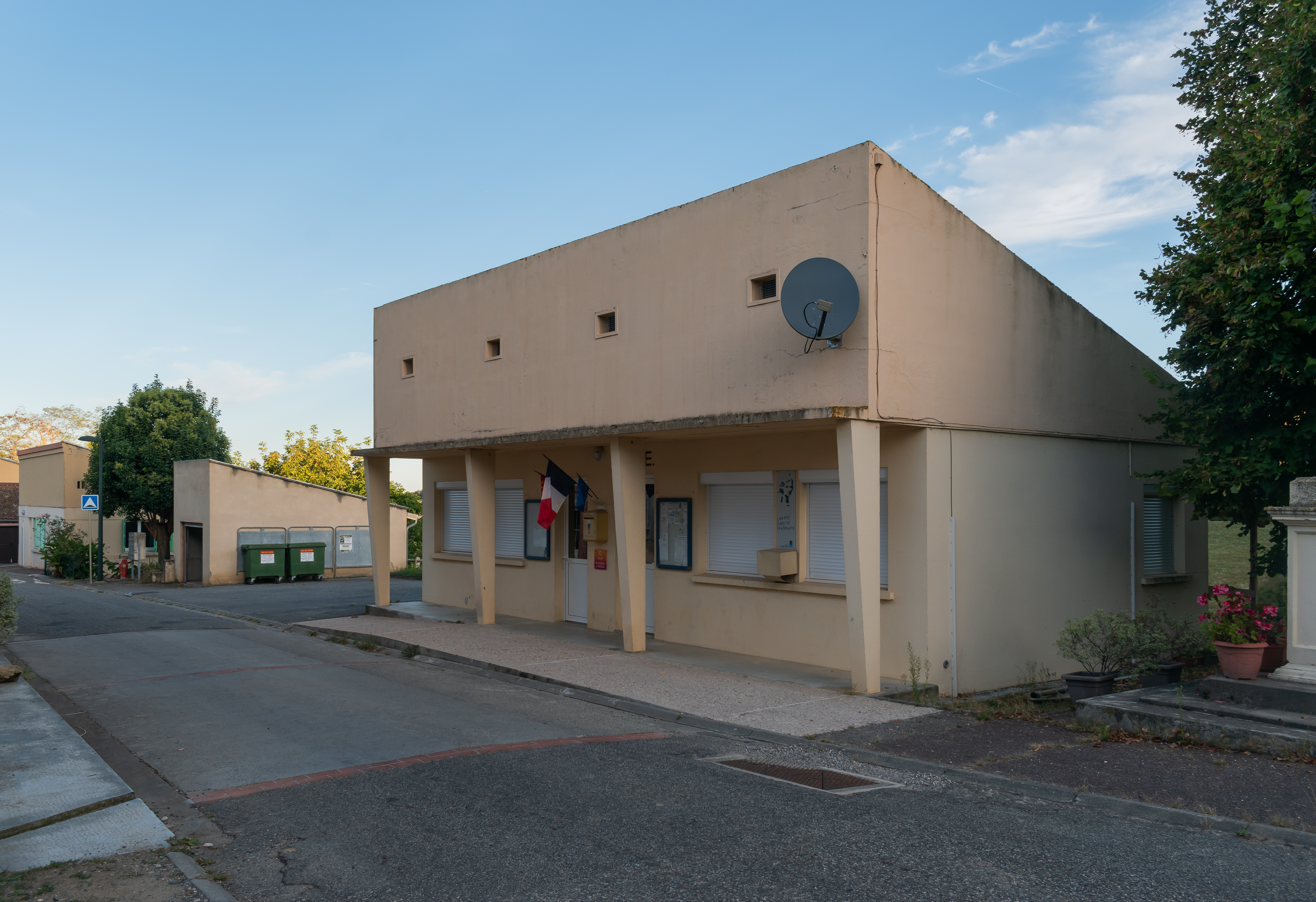
- Town hall of Goudex
- Location of Goudex
- Location within France Location within Occitanie
- Coordinates: 43°22′37″N 0°57′19″E
- Country: France
- Region: Occitania
- Department: Haute-Garonne
- Arrondissement: Saint-Gaudens
- Canton: Cazères

Government
  - Mayor (2020–2026): Laurent Manavit
- Area^{1}: 2.61 km^{2} (1.01 sq mi)
- Elevation: 270 m (890 ft)
- Highest elevation: 350 m (1,150 ft)
- Lowest elevation: 214 m (702 ft)
- Population (2023): 40
  - Density: 15/km^{2} (40/sq mi)
- Time zone: UTC+01:00 (CET)
  - Summer (DST): UTC+02:00 (CEST)
- INSEE/Postal code: 31223 /31230
- ^{1} French Land Register data, which excludes lakes, ponds, glaciers > 1 km^{2} (0.386 sq mi or 247 acres) and river estuaries.

Goudex is a commune in the Haute-Garonne department in southwestern France.

== Population ==
Historical population
Year	Pop.	±% p.a.
1968	54	—
1975	47	−1.96%
1982	48	+0.30%
1990	47	−0.26%
1999	43	−0.98%
2007	41	−0.59%
2012	46	+2.33%
2017	47	+0.43%
2023	40	−2.65%
Source: INSEE

== See also ==
- Communes of the Haute-Garonne department
- Savès
