= Le Plan =

- Commune
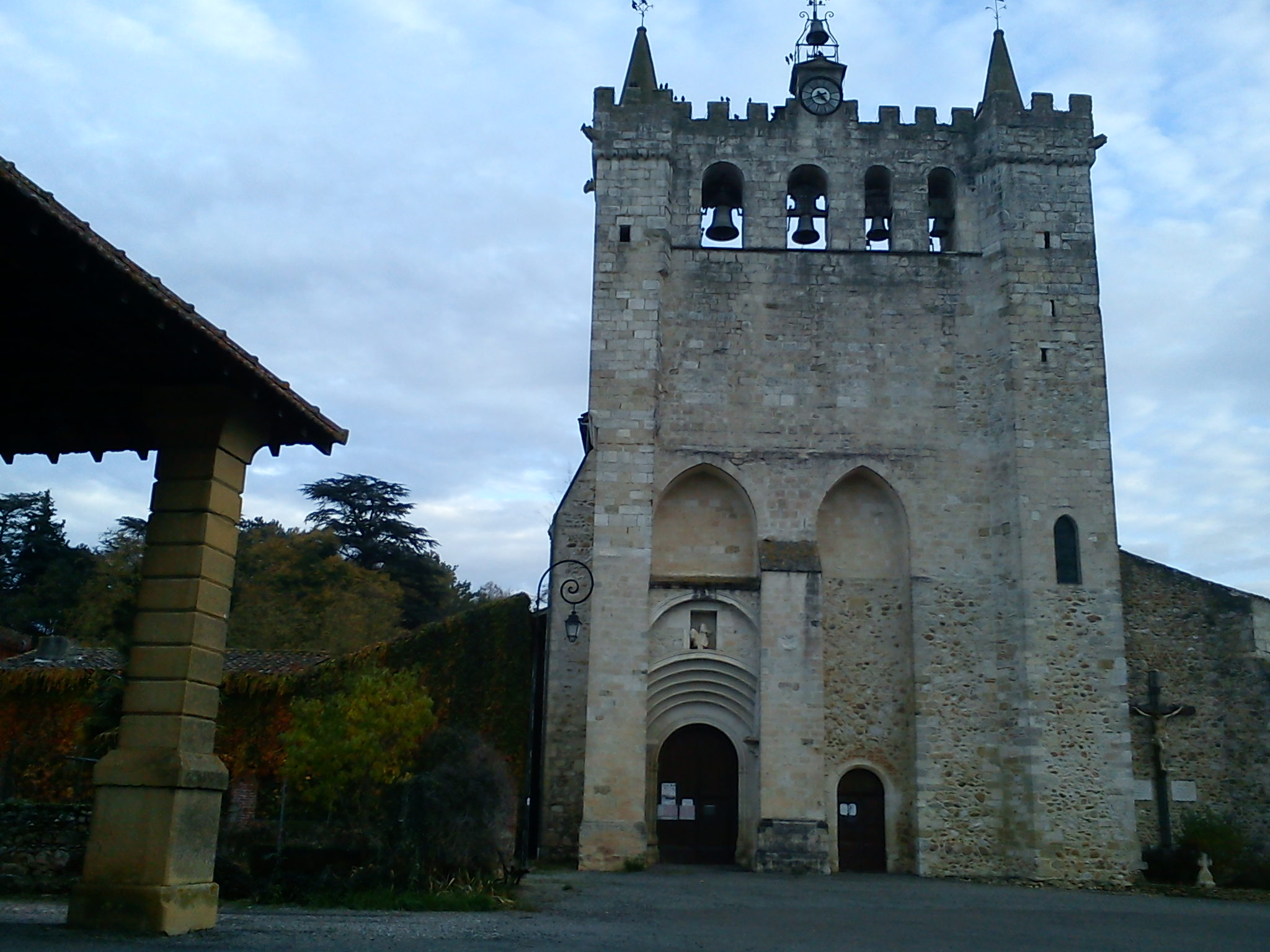
- The church in Le Plan

- Coat of arms
- Location of Le Plan
- Location within France Location within Occitanie
- Coordinates: 43°10′04″N 1°07′16″E
- Country: France
- Region: Occitania
- Department: Haute-Garonne
- Arrondissement: Muret
- Canton: Cazères

Government
  - Mayor (2020–2026): Jacques Servat
- Area^{1}: 8.02 km^{2} (3.10 sq mi)
- Elevation: 260 m (850 ft)
- Highest elevation: 480 m (1,570 ft)
- Lowest elevation: 246 m (807 ft)
- Population (2023): 441
  - Density: 55.0/km^{2} (142/sq mi)
- Time zone: UTC+01:00 (CET)
  - Summer (DST): UTC+02:00 (CEST)
- INSEE/Postal code: 31425 /31220
- ^{1} French Land Register data, which excludes lakes, ponds, glaciers > 1 km^{2} (0.386 sq mi or 247 acres) and river estuaries.

Le Plan (French pronunciation: [lə plɑ̃]) is a commune in the Haute-Garonne department in southwestern France.

== Population ==
Historical population
Year	Pop.	±% p.a.
1968	281	—
1975	277	−0.20%
1982	290	+0.66%
1990	300	+0.42%
1999	315	+0.54%
2007	424	+3.78%
2012	490	+2.94%
2017	447	−1.82%
2023	441	−0.22%
Source: INSEE

== See also ==
- Communes of the Haute-Garonne department
