= Montoussin =

- Commune
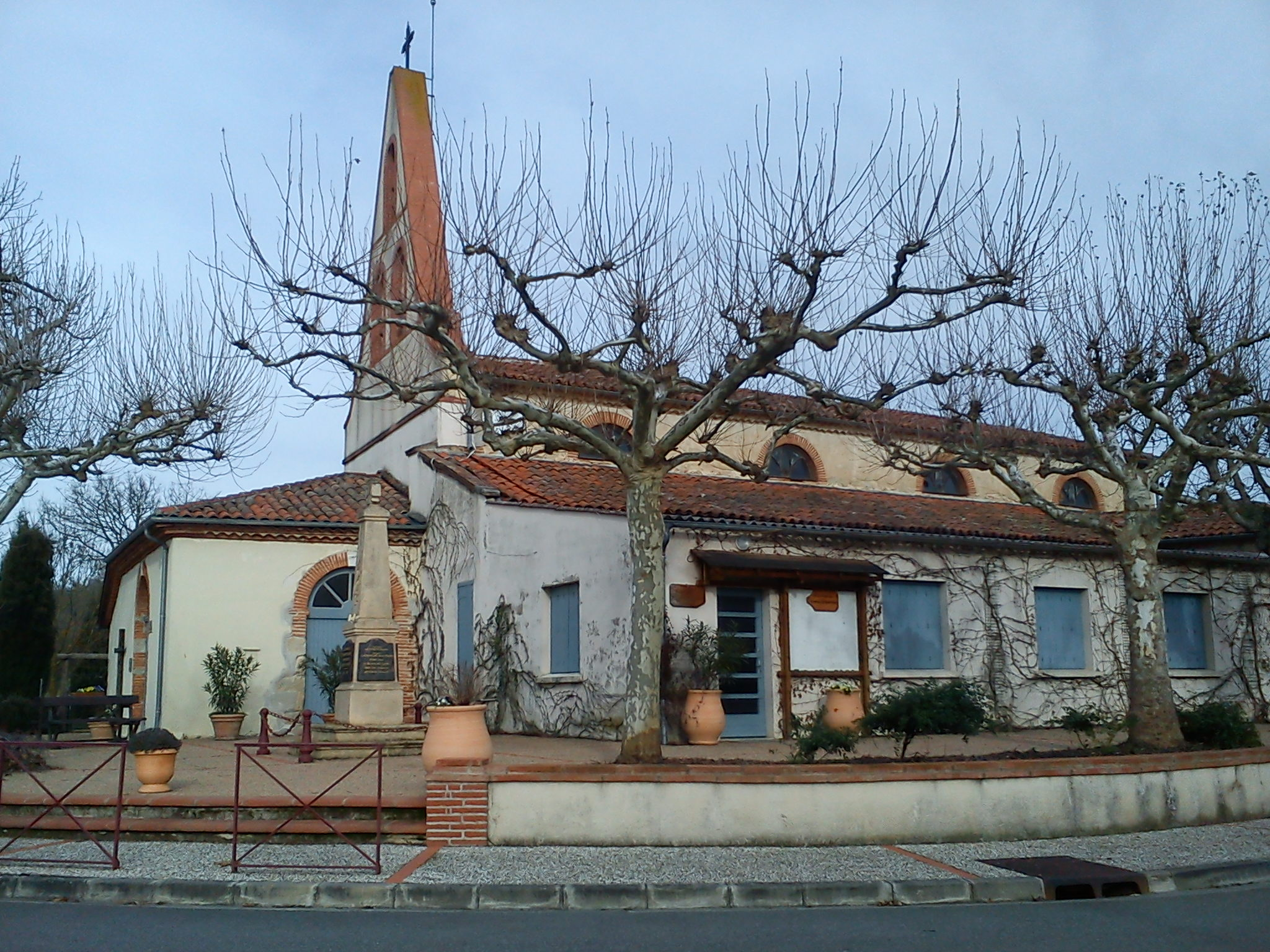
- The church in Montoussin
- Location of Montoussin
- Location within France Location within Occitanie
- Coordinates: 43°16′36″N 1°00′43″E
- Country: France
- Region: Occitania
- Department: Haute-Garonne
- Arrondissement: Muret
- Canton: Cazères

Government
  - Mayor (2020–2026): Claude Peres
- Area^{1}: 4.83 km^{2} (1.86 sq mi)
- Elevation: 285 m (935 ft)
- Highest elevation: 360 m (1,180 ft)
- Lowest elevation: 254 m (833 ft)
- Population (2023): 126
  - Density: 26.1/km^{2} (67.6/sq mi)
- Time zone: UTC+01:00 (CET)
  - Summer (DST): UTC+02:00 (CEST)
- INSEE/Postal code: 31387 /31430
- ^{1} French Land Register data, which excludes lakes, ponds, glaciers > 1 km^{2} (0.386 sq mi or 247 acres) and river estuaries.

Montoussin (French pronunciation: [mɔ̃tusɛ̃]; Occitan: Montossin) is a commune in the Haute-Garonne department of southwestern France.

== Population ==
Historical population
Year	Pop.	±% p.a.
1968	97	—
1975	89	−1.22%
1982	91	+0.32%
1990	108	+2.16%
1999	90	−2.01%
2007	109	+2.42%
2012	127	+3.10%
2017	132	+0.78%
2023	126	−0.77%
Source: INSEE

== See also ==
- Communes of the Haute-Garonne department
