= Lautignac =

- Commune
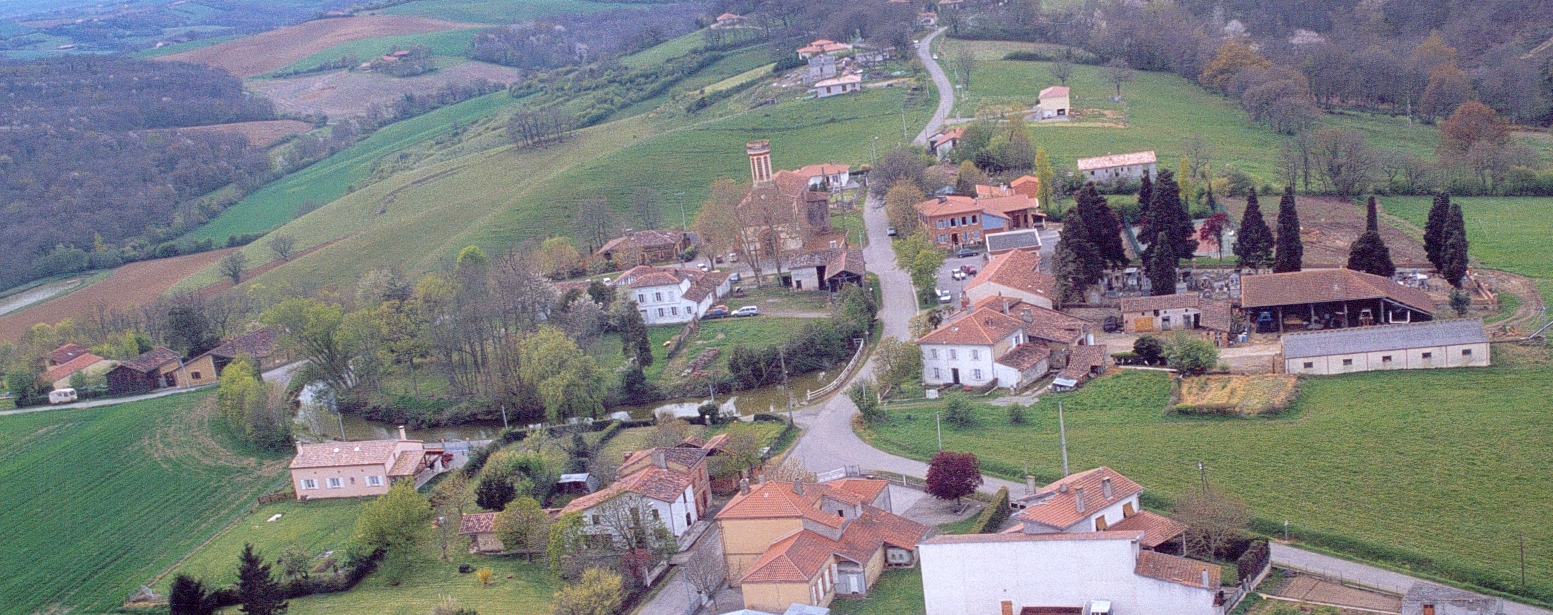
- An aerial view of Lautignac
- Location of Lautignac
- Location within France Location within Occitanie
- Coordinates: 43°22′57″N 1°03′29″E
- Country: France
- Region: Occitania
- Department: Haute-Garonne
- Arrondissement: Muret
- Canton: Cazères

Government
  - Mayor (2020–2026): Monique Pellizzer
- Area^{1}: 17.77 km^{2} (6.86 sq mi)
- Elevation: 310 m (1,020 ft)
- Highest elevation: 351 m (1,152 ft)
- Lowest elevation: 281 m (922 ft)
- Population (2023): 248
  - Density: 14.0/km^{2} (36.1/sq mi)
- Time zone: UTC+01:00 (CET)
  - Summer (DST): UTC+02:00 (CEST)
- INSEE/Postal code: 31283 /31370
- ^{1} French Land Register data, which excludes lakes, ponds, glaciers > 1 km^{2} (0.386 sq mi or 247 acres) and river estuaries.

Lautignac (French pronunciation: [lotiɲak]; Occitan: Lautinhac) is a commune in the Haute-Garonne department in southwestern France.

== Population ==
Historical population
Year	Pop.	±% p.a.
1968	205	—
1975	171	−2.56%
1982	191	+1.59%
1990	201	+0.64%
1999	218	+0.91%
2007	267	+2.57%
2012	282	+1.10%
2017	265	−1.24%
2023	248	−1.10%
Source: INSEE

== See also ==
Communes of the Haute-Garonne department
