= Cassagnabère-Tournas =

- Commune
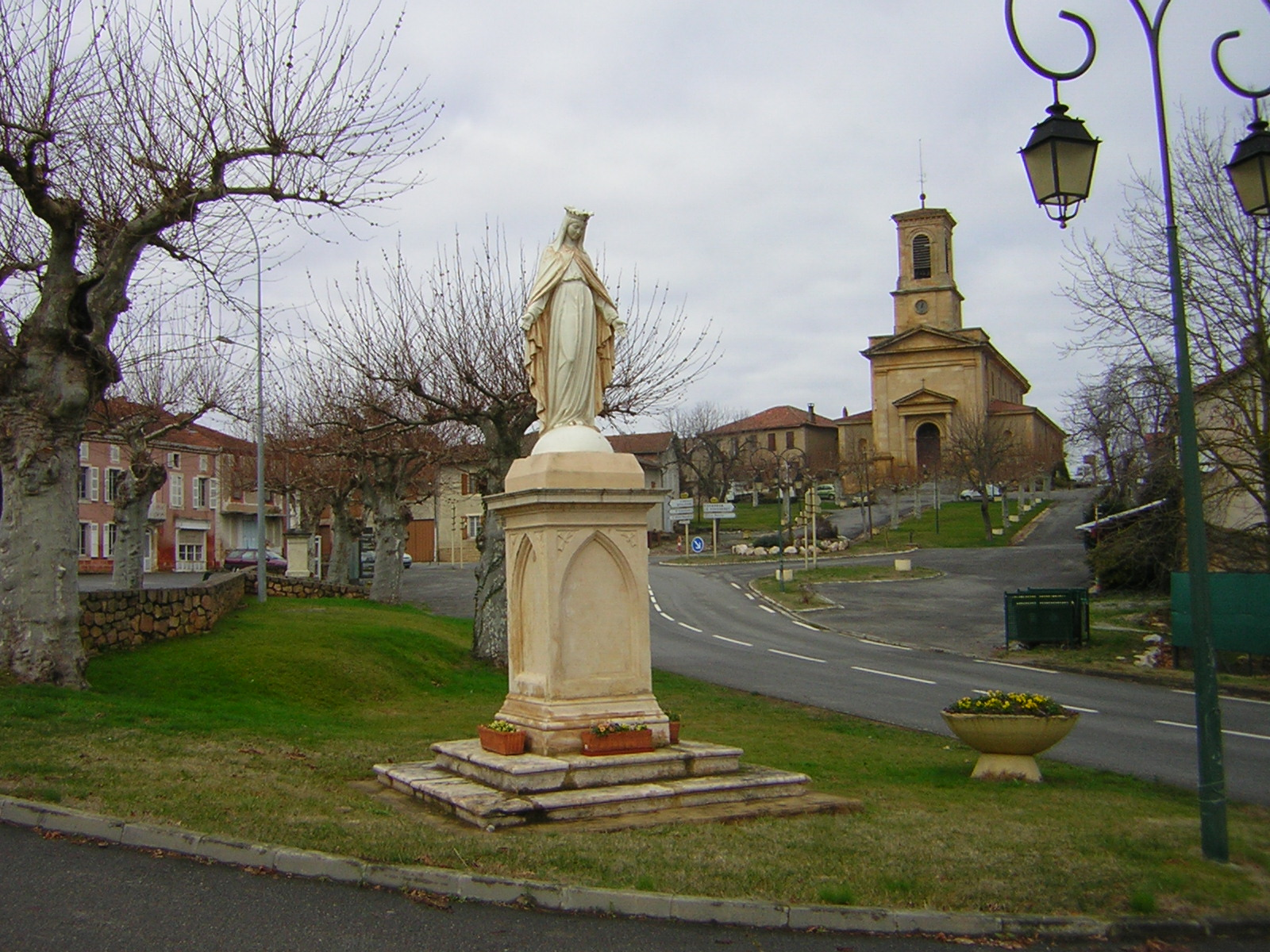
- The church and monument in Cassagnabère-Tournas

- Coat of arms
- Location of Cassagnabère-Tournas
- Location within France Location within Occitanie
- Coordinates: 43°11′56″N 0°47′30″E
- Country: France
- Region: Occitania
- Department: Haute-Garonne
- Arrondissement: Saint-Gaudens
- Canton: Cazères
- Intercommunality: Cœur et Coteaux du Comminges

Government
  - Mayor (2020–2026): Philippe Vignes
- Area^{1}: 25.24 km^{2} (9.75 sq mi)
- Elevation: 390 m (1,280 ft)
- Highest elevation: 422 m (1,385 ft)
- Lowest elevation: 286 m (938 ft)
- Population (2023): 468
  - Density: 18.5/km^{2} (48.0/sq mi)
- Time zone: UTC+01:00 (CET)
  - Summer (DST): UTC+02:00 (CEST)
- INSEE/Postal code: 31109 /31420
- ^{1} French Land Register data, which excludes lakes, ponds, glaciers > 1 km^{2} (0.386 sq mi or 247 acres) and river estuaries.

Cassagnabère-Tournas is a commune in the Haute-Garonne department in southwestern France.

== Population ==
Historical population
Year	Pop.	±% p.a.
1968	544	—
1975	464	−2.25%
1982	424	−1.28%
1990	426	+0.06%
1999	389	−1.00%
2007	395	+0.19%
2012	455	+2.87%
2017	461	+0.26%
2023	468	+0.25%
Source: INSEE

== See also ==
- Communes of the Haute-Garonne department
