= Forgues =

- Commune
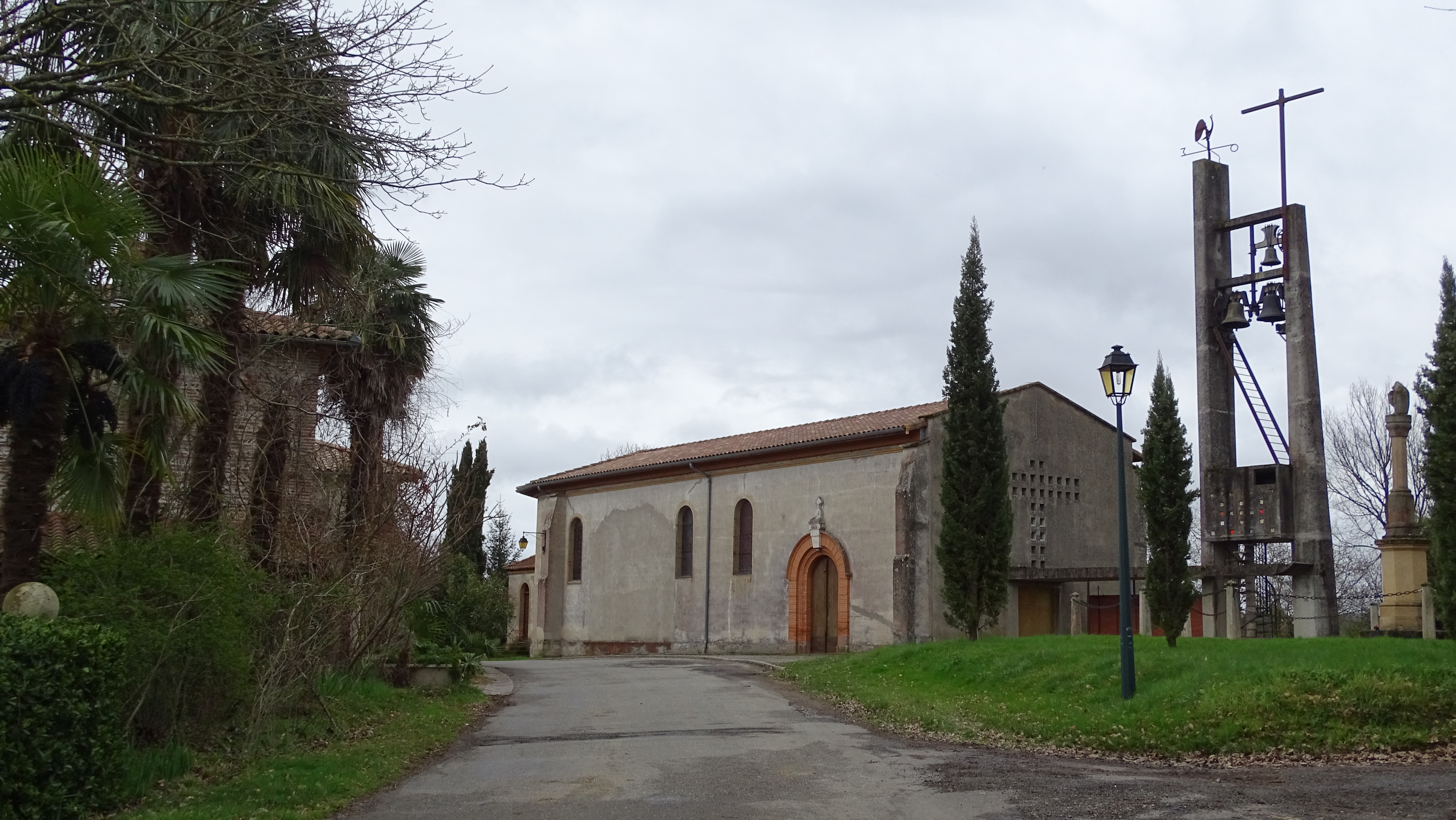
- The church in Forgues
- Location of Forgues
- Location within France Location within Occitanie
- Coordinates: 43°25′58″N 1°02′47″E
- Country: France
- Region: Occitania
- Department: Haute-Garonne
- Arrondissement: Muret
- Canton: Cazères

Government
  - Mayor (2020–2026): William Larrieu
- Area^{1}: 5.24 km^{2} (2.02 sq mi)
- Elevation: 290 m (950 ft)
- Highest elevation: 328 m (1,076 ft)
- Lowest elevation: 203 m (666 ft)
- Population (2023): 214
  - Density: 40.8/km^{2} (106/sq mi)
- Time zone: UTC+01:00 (CET)
  - Summer (DST): UTC+02:00 (CEST)
- INSEE/Postal code: 31189 /31370
- ^{1} French Land Register data, which excludes lakes, ponds, glaciers > 1 km^{2} (0.386 sq mi or 247 acres) and river estuaries.

Forgues (French pronunciation: [fɔʁɡ]; Occitan: Hòrgas) is a commune in the Haute-Garonne department in southwestern France.

== Population ==
Historical population
| Year | Pop. | ±% p.a. |
|---|---|---|
| 1968 | 90 | — |
| 1975 | 72 | −3.14% |
| 1982 | 75 | +0.58% |
| 1990 | 120 | +6.05% |
| 1999 | 152 | +2.66% |
| 2007 | 182 | +2.28% |
| 2012 | 191 | +0.97% |
| 2017 | 212 | +2.11% |
| 2023 | 214 | +0.16% |
Source: INSEE

== See also ==
- Communes of the Haute-Garonne department
