= Lescuns =

- Commune
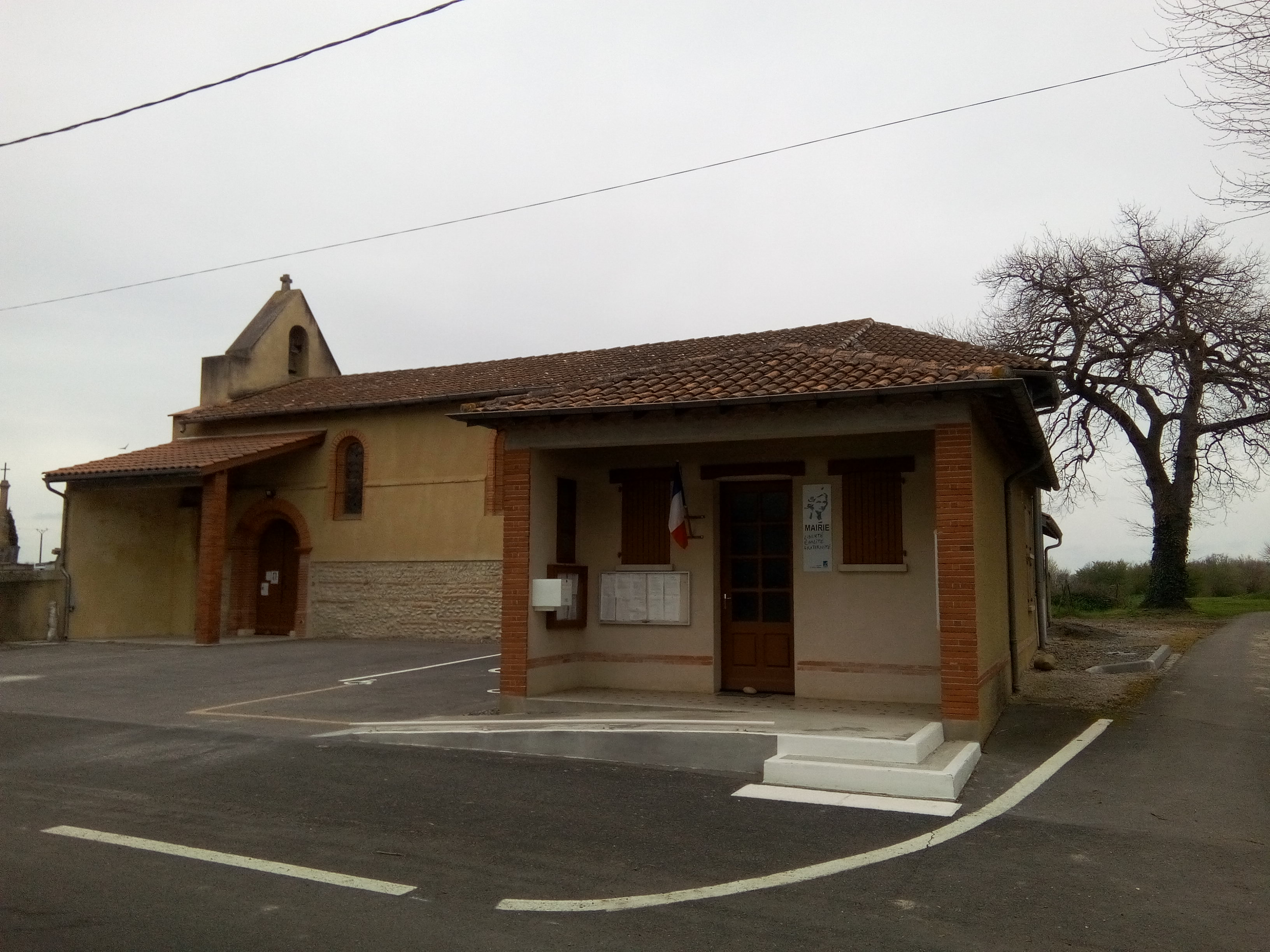
- The town hall in Lescuns
- Location of Lescuns
- Location within France Location within Occitanie
- Coordinates: 43°14′30″N 1°00′49″E
- Country: France
- Region: Occitania
- Department: Haute-Garonne
- Arrondissement: Muret
- Canton: Cazères

Government
  - Mayor (2020–2026): Ingrid Laffont
- Area^{1}: 3.01 km^{2} (1.16 sq mi)
- Elevation: 370 m (1,210 ft)
- Highest elevation: 376 m (1,234 ft)
- Lowest elevation: 256 m (840 ft)
- Population (2023): 75
  - Density: 25/km^{2} (65/sq mi)
- Time zone: UTC+01:00 (CET)
  - Summer (DST): UTC+02:00 (CEST)
- INSEE/Postal code: 31292 /31220
- ^{1} French Land Register data, which excludes lakes, ponds, glaciers > 1 km^{2} (0.386 sq mi or 247 acres) and river estuaries.

Lescuns is a commune in the Haute-Garonne department in southwestern France.

== Population ==
Historical population
Year	Pop.	±% p.a.
1968	45	—
1975	48	+0.93%
1982	44	−1.24%
1990	44	+0.00%
1999	42	−0.52%
2007	54	+3.19%
2012	64	+3.46%
2017	72	+2.38%
2023	75	+0.68%
Source: INSEE

== See also ==
- Communes of the Haute-Garonne department
