= Bachas =

- Commune
- Location of Bachas
- Location within France Location within Occitanie
- Coordinates: 43°14′43″N 0°56′20″E
- Country: France
- Region: Occitania
- Department: Haute-Garonne
- Arrondissement: Saint-Gaudens
- Canton: Cazères
- Intercommunality: Cœur et Coteaux du Comminges

Government
  - Mayor (2020–2026): Bouziane Brini
- Area^{1}: 2.62 km^{2} (1.01 sq mi)
- Elevation: 250 m (820 ft)
- Highest elevation: 364 m (1,194 ft)
- Lowest elevation: 272 m (892 ft)
- Population (2023): 90
  - Density: 34/km^{2} (89/sq mi)
- Time zone: UTC+01:00 (CET)
  - Summer (DST): UTC+02:00 (CEST)
- INSEE/Postal code: 31039 /31420
- ^{1} French Land Register data, which excludes lakes, ponds, glaciers > 1 km^{2} (0.386 sq mi or 247 acres) and river estuaries.

Bachas is a commune in the Haute-Garonne department in southwestern France.

== Population ==
Historical population
Year	Pop.	±% p.a.
1968	103	—
1975	91	−1.75%
1982	67	−4.28%
1990	69	+0.37%
1999	75	+0.93%
2007	68	−1.22%
2012	58	−3.13%
2017	71	+4.13%
2023	90	+4.03%
Source: INSEE

== See also ==
- Communes of the Haute-Garonne department
