= Polastron, Haute-Garonne =

Polastron
- Commune
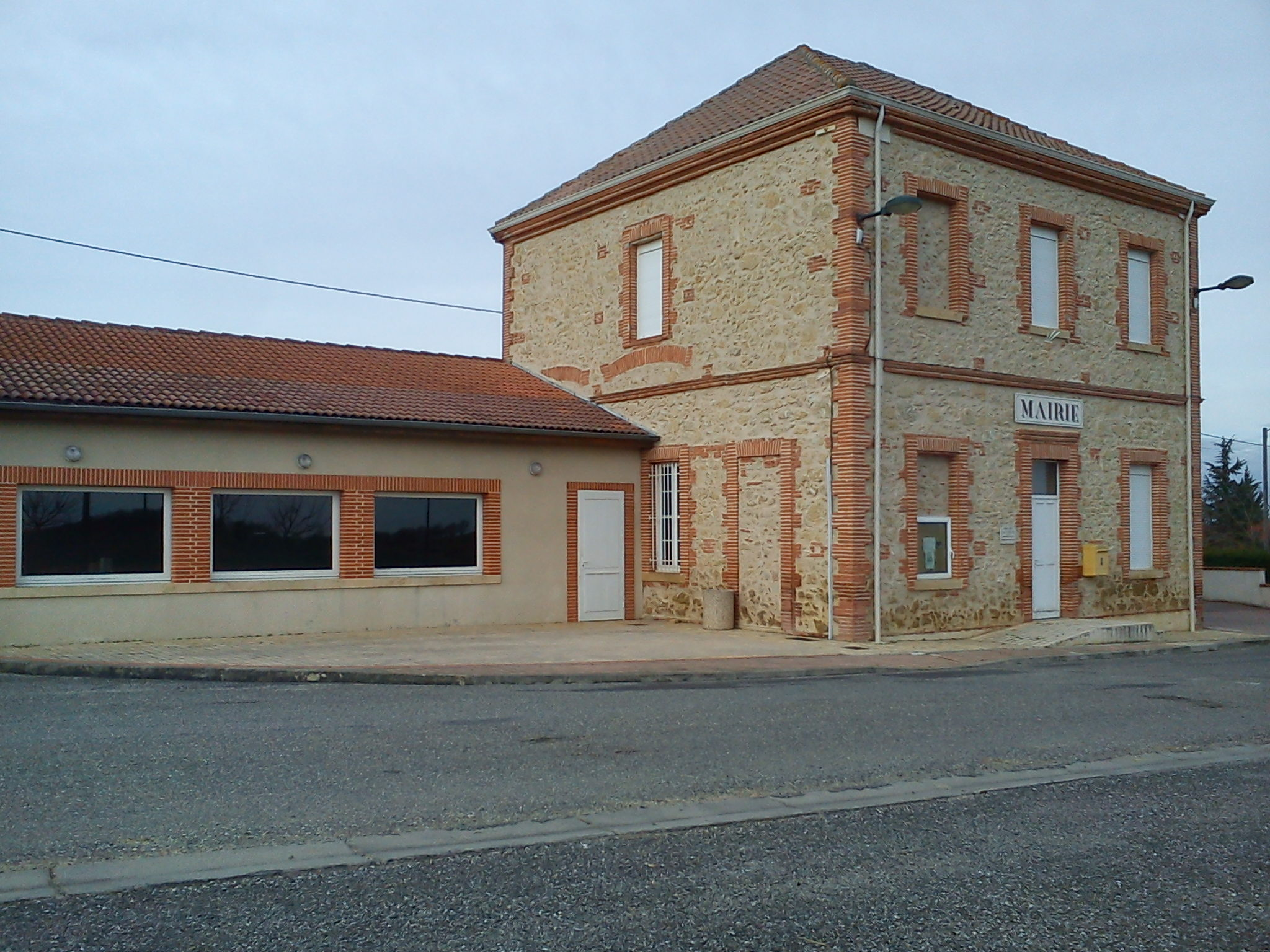
- Town hall
- Location of Polastron
- Location within France Location within Occitanie
- Coordinates: 43°19′28″N 0°57′27″E
- Country: France
- Region: Occitania
- Department: Haute-Garonne
- Arrondissement: Muret
- Canton: Cazères

Government
  - Mayor (2020–2026): Marie-Hélène Lauga
- Area^{1}: 4.78 km^{2} (1.85 sq mi)
- Elevation: 300 m (980 ft)
- Highest elevation: 351 m (1,152 ft)
- Lowest elevation: 248 m (814 ft)
- Population (2023): 70
  - Density: 15/km^{2} (38/sq mi)
- Time zone: UTC+01:00 (CET)
  - Summer (DST): UTC+02:00 (CEST)
- INSEE/Postal code: 31428 /31430
- ^{1} French Land Register data, which excludes lakes, ponds, glaciers > 1 km^{2} (0.386 sq mi or 247 acres) and river estuaries.

Polastron (French pronunciation: [pɔlastʁɔ̃]) is a commune in the Haute-Garonne department in southwestern France.

== Population ==
Historical population
Year	Pop.	±% p.a.
1968	92	—
1975	80	−1.98%
1982	67	−2.50%
1990	61	−1.17%
1999	64	+0.53%
2007	59	−1.01%
2012	60	+0.34%
2017	54	−2.09%
2023	70	+4.42%
Source: INSEE

== See also ==
- Communes of the Haute-Garonne department
