= Eoux =

- Commune
- Location of Eoux
- Location within France Location within Occitanie
- Coordinates: 43°16′24″N 0°53′14″E
- Country: France
- Region: Occitania
- Department: Haute-Garonne
- Arrondissement: Saint-Gaudens
- Canton: Cazères
- Intercommunality: Cœur et Coteaux du Comminges

Government
  - Mayor (2020–2026): Monique Rey
- Area^{1}: 9.17 km^{2} (3.54 sq mi)
- Elevation: 307 m (1,007 ft)
- Highest elevation: 374 m (1,227 ft)
- Lowest elevation: 272 m (892 ft)
- Population (2023): 131
  - Density: 14.3/km^{2} (37.0/sq mi)
- Time zone: UTC+01:00 (CET)
  - Summer (DST): UTC+02:00 (CEST)
- INSEE/Postal code: 31168 /31420
- ^{1} French Land Register data, which excludes lakes, ponds, glaciers > 1 km^{2} (0.386 sq mi or 247 acres) and river estuaries.

Eoux is a commune in the Haute-Garonne department in southwestern France.

== Population ==
Historical population
Year	Pop.	±% p.a.
1968	185	—
1975	156	−2.41%
1982	154	−0.18%
1990	130	−2.10%
1999	121	−0.79%
2007	115	−0.63%
2012	123	+1.35%
2017	119	−0.66%
2023	131	+1.61%
Source: INSEE

== See also ==
- Communes of the Haute-Garonne department
