= Montclar-de-Comminges =

- Commune
- Location of Montclar-de-Comminges
- Location within France Location within Occitanie
- Coordinates: 43°10′41″N 1°01′20″E
- Country: France
- Region: Occitania
- Department: Haute-Garonne
- Arrondissement: Muret
- Canton: Cazères

Government
  - Mayor (2020–2026): François Ribet
- Area^{1}: 6.45 km^{2} (2.49 sq mi)
- Elevation: 350 m (1,150 ft)
- Highest elevation: 570 m (1,870 ft)
- Lowest elevation: 311 m (1,020 ft)
- Population (2023): 79
  - Density: 12/km^{2} (32/sq mi)
- Time zone: UTC+01:00 (CET)
  - Summer (DST): UTC+02:00 (CEST)
- INSEE/Postal code: 31367 /31220
- ^{1} French Land Register data, which excludes lakes, ponds, glaciers > 1 km^{2} (0.386 sq mi or 247 acres) and river estuaries.

Montclar-de-Comminges (French pronunciation: [mɔ̃klaʁ də kɔmɛ̃ʒ], literally Montclar of Comminges; Occitan: Montclar de Comenge) is a commune in the Haute-Garonne department in southwestern France.

== Population ==
Historical population
Year	Pop.	±% p.a.
1968	104	—
1975	89	−2.20%
1982	77	−2.05%
1990	70	−1.18%
1999	69	−0.16%
2007	74	+0.88%
2012	87	+3.29%
2017	84	−0.70%
2023	79	−1.02%
Source: INSEE

== See also ==
- Communes of the Haute-Garonne department
