= Martisserre =

- Commune
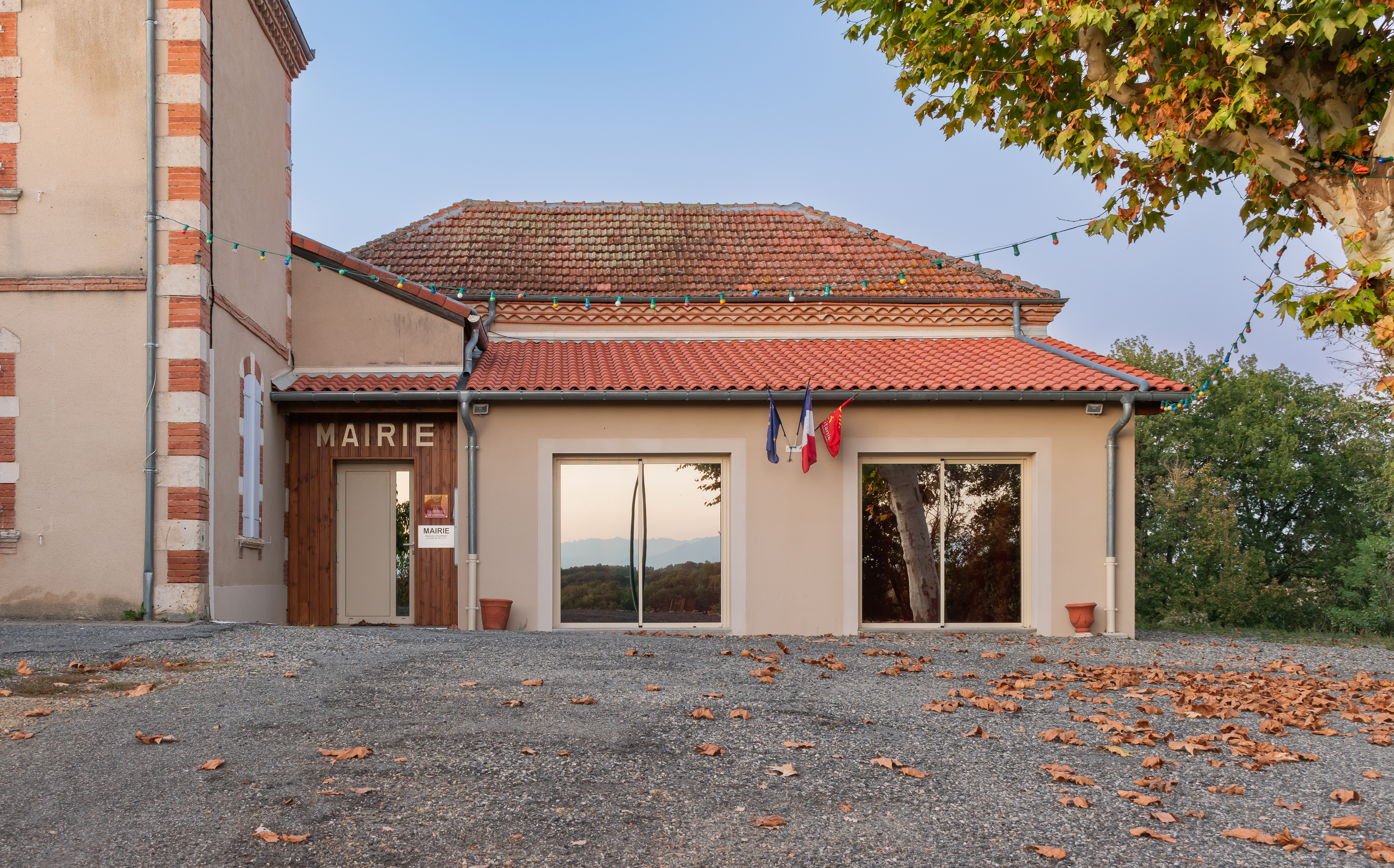
- Town hall of Martisserre
- Location of Martisserre
- Location within France Location within Occitanie
- Coordinates: 43°23′31″N 0°52′47″E
- Country: France
- Region: Occitania
- Department: Haute-Garonne
- Arrondissement: Saint-Gaudens
- Canton: Cazères

Government
  - Mayor (2020–2026): Maryse Toulon
- Area^{1}: 6.17 km^{2} (2.38 sq mi)
- Elevation: 180 m (590 ft)
- Highest elevation: 326 m (1,070 ft)
- Lowest elevation: 210 m (690 ft)
- Population (2023): 64
  - Density: 10/km^{2} (27/sq mi)
- Time zone: UTC+01:00 (CET)
  - Summer (DST): UTC+02:00 (CEST)
- INSEE/Postal code: 31322 /31230
- ^{1} French Land Register data, which excludes lakes, ponds, glaciers > 1 km^{2} (0.386 sq mi or 247 acres) and river estuaries.

Martisserre (French pronunciation: [maʁtisɛʁ]; Occitan: Martissèrra) is a commune in the Haute-Garonne department in southwestern France.

== Population ==
Historical population
Year	Pop.	±% p.a.
1968	82	—
1975	57	−5.06%
1982	54	−0.77%
1990	61	+1.54%
1999	53	−1.55%
2007	64	+2.39%
2012	60	−1.28%
2017	61	+0.33%
2023	64	+0.80%
Source: INSEE

== See also ==
- Communes of the Haute-Garonne department
