= Lahage =

- Commune
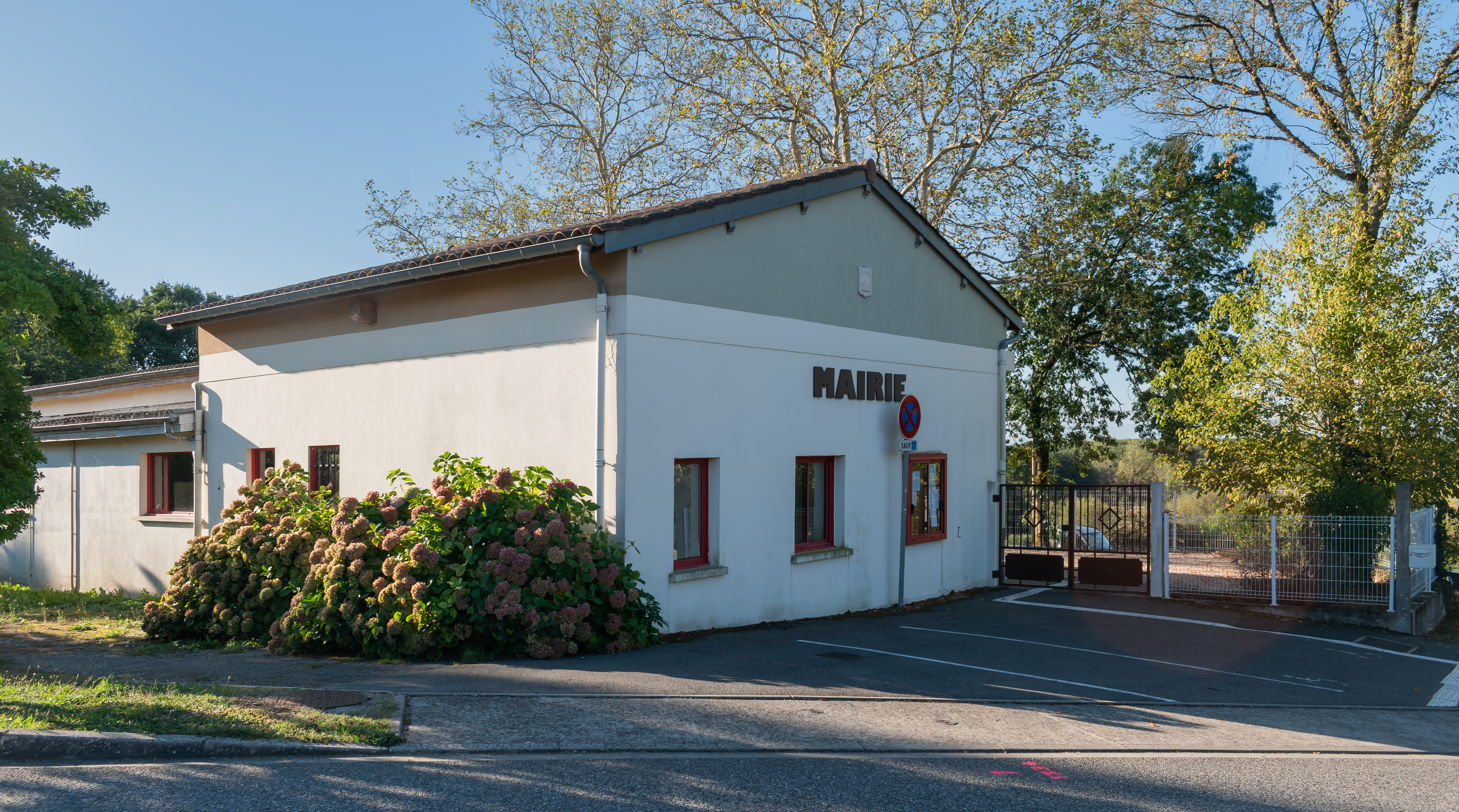
- Town hall of Lahage
- Location of Lahage
- Location within France Location within Occitanie
- Coordinates: 43°26′33″N 1°03′43″E
- Country: France
- Region: Occitania
- Department: Haute-Garonne
- Arrondissement: Muret
- Canton: Cazères

Government
  - Mayor (2020–2026): Serge Bonnemaison
- Area^{1}: 7.65 km^{2} (2.95 sq mi)
- Elevation: 330 m (1,080 ft)
- Highest elevation: 333 m (1,093 ft)
- Lowest elevation: 223 m (732 ft)
- Population (2023): 212
  - Density: 27.7/km^{2} (71.8/sq mi)
- Time zone: UTC+01:00 (CET)
  - Summer (DST): UTC+02:00 (CEST)
- INSEE/Postal code: 31266 /31370
- ^{1} French Land Register data, which excludes lakes, ponds, glaciers > 1 km^{2} (0.386 sq mi or 247 acres) and river estuaries.

Lahage (French pronunciation: [la.aʒ]; Occitan: La Haja) is a commune in the Haute-Garonne department in southwestern France.

== Population ==
Historical population
Year	Pop.	±% p.a.
1968	170	—
1975	94	−8.12%
1982	171	+8.92%
1990	258	+5.28%
1999	262	+0.17%
2007	237	−1.25%
2012	224	−1.12%
2017	208	−1.47%
2023	212	+0.32%
Source: INSEE

== See also ==
- Communes of the Haute-Garonne department
