= Frontignan-Savès =

- Commune
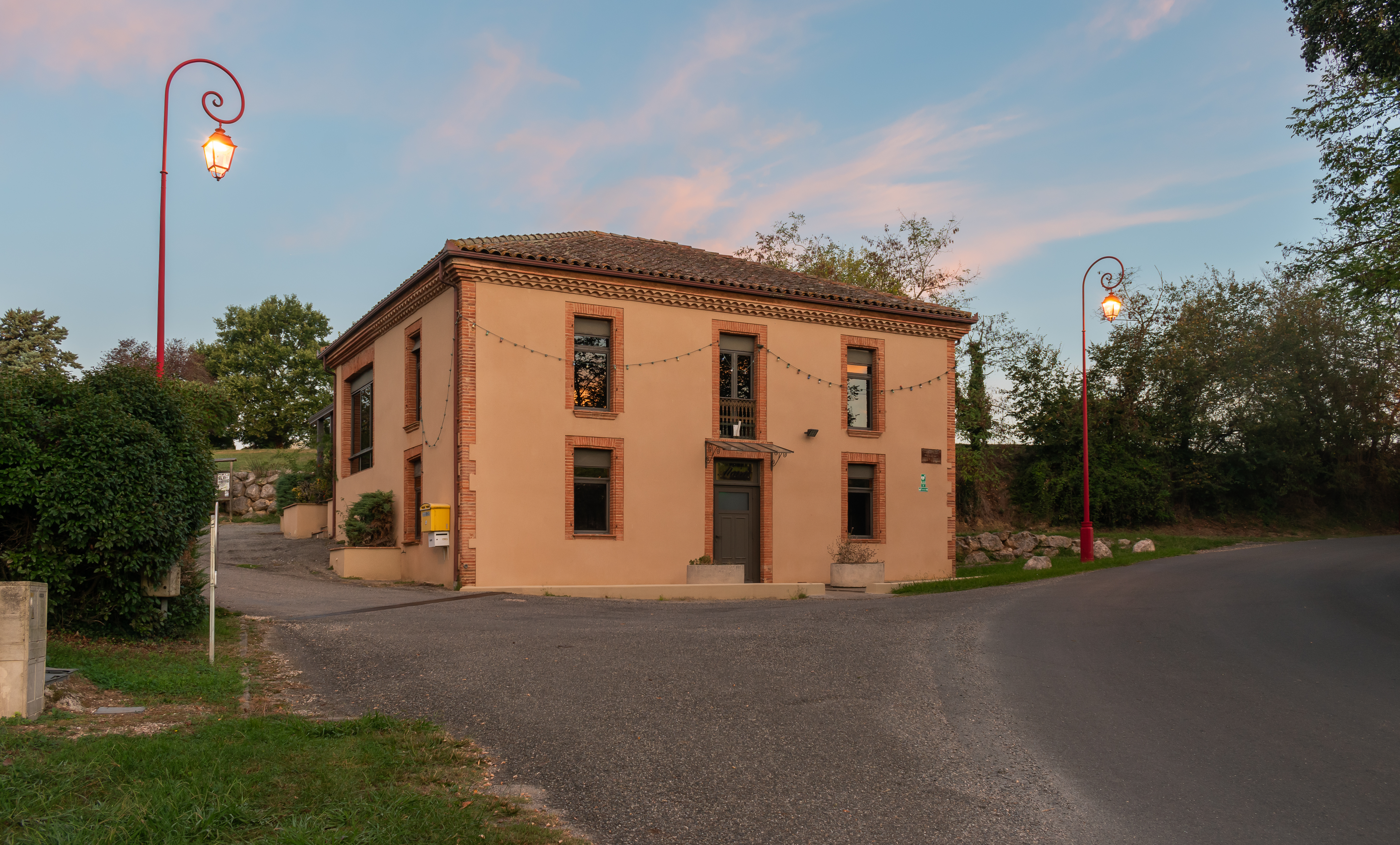
- Town hall of Frontignan-Saves
- Location of Frontignan-Savès
- Location within France Location within Occitanie
- Coordinates: 43°23′50″N 0°55′18″E
- Country: France
- Region: Occitania
- Department: Haute-Garonne
- Arrondissement: Saint-Gaudens
- Canton: Cazères

Government
  - Mayor (2020–2026): Thierry Salles
- Area^{1}: 2.81 km^{2} (1.08 sq mi)
- Elevation: 193 m (633 ft)
- Highest elevation: 316 m (1,037 ft)
- Lowest elevation: 192 m (630 ft)
- Population (2023): 66
  - Density: 23/km^{2} (61/sq mi)
- Time zone: UTC+01:00 (CET)
  - Summer (DST): UTC+02:00 (CEST)
- INSEE/Postal code: 31201 /31230
- ^{1} French Land Register data, which excludes lakes, ponds, glaciers > 1 km^{2} (0.386 sq mi or 247 acres) and river estuaries.

Frontignan-Savès (French pronunciation: [fʁɔ̃tiɲɑ̃ savɛs]; Occitan: Frontinhan de Savés) is a commune in the Haute-Garonne department in southwestern France.

== Population ==
Historical population
Year	Pop.	±% p.a.
1968	68	—
1975	65	−0.64%
1982	71	+1.27%
1990	46	−5.28%
1999	49	+0.70%
2007	57	+1.91%
2012	61	+1.37%
2017	70	+2.79%
2023	66	−0.98%
Source: INSEE

== See also ==
- Communes of the Haute-Garonne department
