= Saint-Michel, Haute-Garonne =

Saint-Michel
- Commune
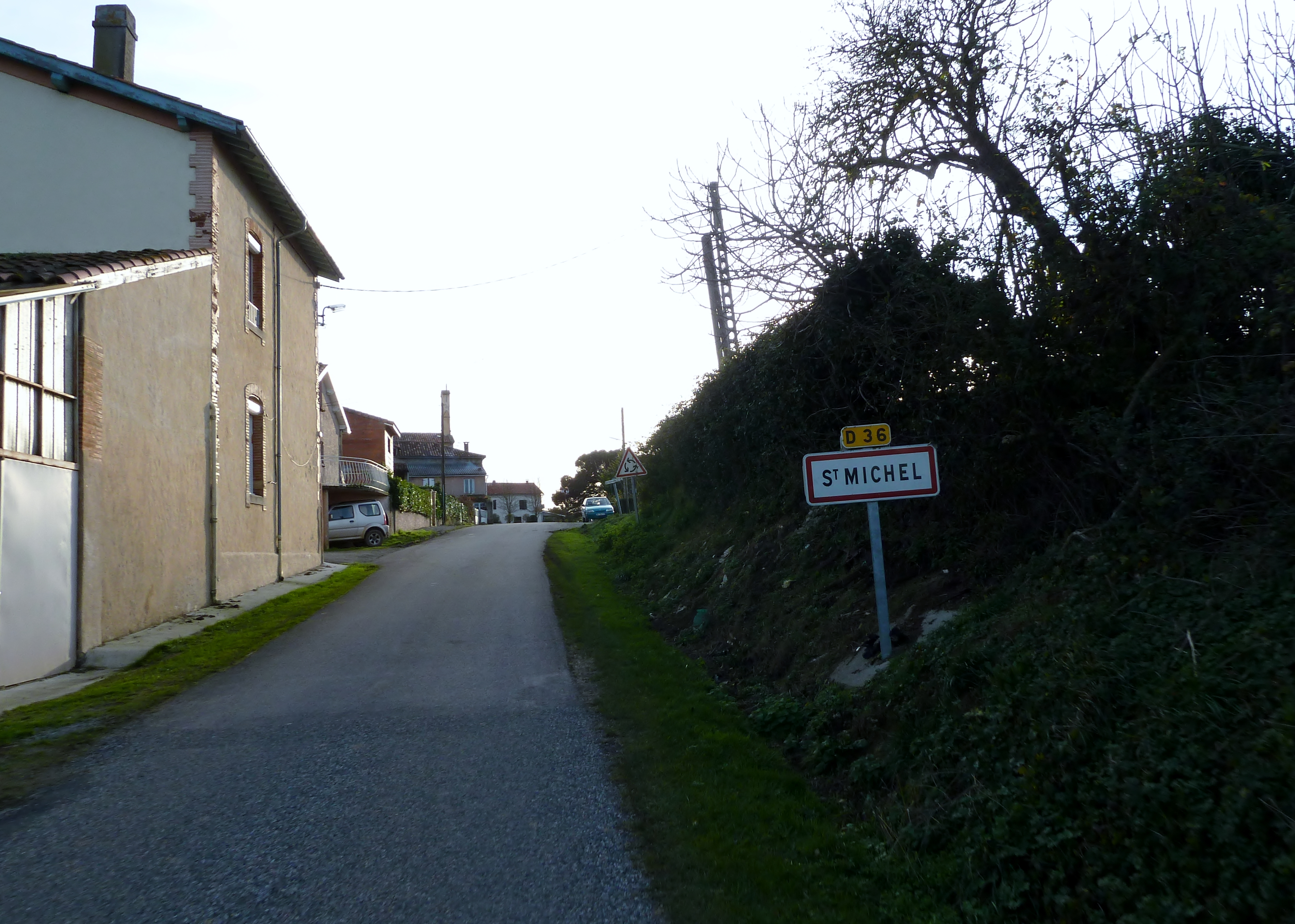
- The road into Saint-Michel
- Location of Saint-Michel
- Location within France Location within Occitanie
- Coordinates: 43°10′06″N 1°05′08″E
- Country: France
- Region: Occitania
- Department: Haute-Garonne
- Arrondissement: Muret
- Canton: Cazères

Government
  - Mayor (2022–2026): Bastien Puech
- Area^{1}: 15.53 km^{2} (6.00 sq mi)
- Elevation: 390 m (1,280 ft)
- Highest elevation: 543 m (1,781 ft)
- Lowest elevation: 267 m (876 ft)
- Population (2023): 306
  - Density: 19.7/km^{2} (51.0/sq mi)
- Time zone: UTC+01:00 (CET)
  - Summer (DST): UTC+02:00 (CEST)
- INSEE/Postal code: 31505 /31220
- ^{1} French Land Register data, which excludes lakes, ponds, glaciers > 1 km^{2} (0.386 sq mi or 247 acres) and river estuaries.

Saint-Michel (French pronunciation: [sɛ̃ miʃɛl]; Occitan: Sent Miquèu) is a commune in the Haute-Garonne department in southwestern France.

== Population ==
Historical population
Year	Pop.	±% p.a.
1968	190	—
1975	199	+0.66%
1982	169	−2.31%
1990	183	+1.00%
1999	232	+2.67%
2007	307	+3.56%
2012	321	+0.90%
2017	318	−0.19%
2023	306	−0.64%
Source: INSEE

== See also ==
- Communes of the Haute-Garonne department
