= Mirambeau, Haute-Garonne =

Mirambeau
- Commune
- Location of Mirambeau
- Location within France Location within Occitanie
- Coordinates: 43°24′14″N 0°52′04″E
- Country: France
- Region: Occitania
- Department: Haute-Garonne
- Arrondissement: Saint-Gaudens
- Canton: Cazères

Government
  - Mayor (2020–2026): Josiane De Marchi
- Area^{1}: 3.96 km^{2} (1.53 sq mi)
- Elevation: 304 m (997 ft)
- Highest elevation: 300 m (980 ft)
- Lowest elevation: 183 m (600 ft)
- Population (2023): 64
  - Density: 16/km^{2} (42/sq mi)
- Time zone: UTC+01:00 (CET)
  - Summer (DST): UTC+02:00 (CEST)
- INSEE/Postal code: 31343 /31230
- ^{1} French Land Register data, which excludes lakes, ponds, glaciers > 1 km^{2} (0.386 sq mi or 247 acres) and river estuaries.

Mirambeau (French pronunciation: [miʁɑ̃bo]; Occitan: Mirambèu) is a commune in the Haute-Garonne department in southwestern France.

== Population ==
Historical population
Year	Pop.	±% p.a.
1968	69	—
1975	54	−3.44%
1982	58	+1.03%
1990	55	−0.66%
1999	51	−0.84%
2007	53	+0.48%
2012	62	+3.19%
2017	63	+0.32%
2023	64	+0.26%
Source: INSEE

== See also ==
- Communes of the Haute-Garonne department
