= Montbernard =

- Commune
- Location of Montbernard
- Location within France Location within Occitanie
- Coordinates: 43°18′07″N 0°46′22″E
- Country: France
- Region: Occitania
- Department: Haute-Garonne
- Arrondissement: Saint-Gaudens
- Canton: Cazères

Government
  - Mayor (2020–2026): Pascal Coumes
- Area^{1}: 18.31 km^{2} (7.07 sq mi)
- Elevation: 300 m (980 ft)
- Highest elevation: 373 m (1,224 ft)
- Lowest elevation: 224 m (735 ft)
- Population (2023): 215
  - Density: 11.7/km^{2} (30.4/sq mi)
- Time zone: UTC+01:00 (CET)
  - Summer (DST): UTC+02:00 (CEST)
- INSEE/Postal code: 31363 /31230
- ^{1} French Land Register data, which excludes lakes, ponds, glaciers > 1 km^{2} (0.386 sq mi or 247 acres) and river estuaries.

Montbernard (French pronunciation: [mɔ̃bɛʁnaʁ]) is a commune in the Haute-Garonne department of southwestern France.

== Population ==
Historical population
| Year | Pop. | ±% p.a. |
|---|---|---|
| 1968 | 318 | — |
| 1975 | 267 | −2.47% |
| 1982 | 251 | −0.88% |
| 1990 | 230 | −1.09% |
| 1999 | 214 | −0.80% |
| 2007 | 210 | −0.24% |
| 2012 | 215 | +0.47% |
| 2017 | 222 | +0.64% |
| 2023 | 215 | −0.53% |
Source: INSEE

== See also ==
- Communes of the Haute-Garonne department
