= Montaut, Haute-Garonne =

Montaut
- Commune
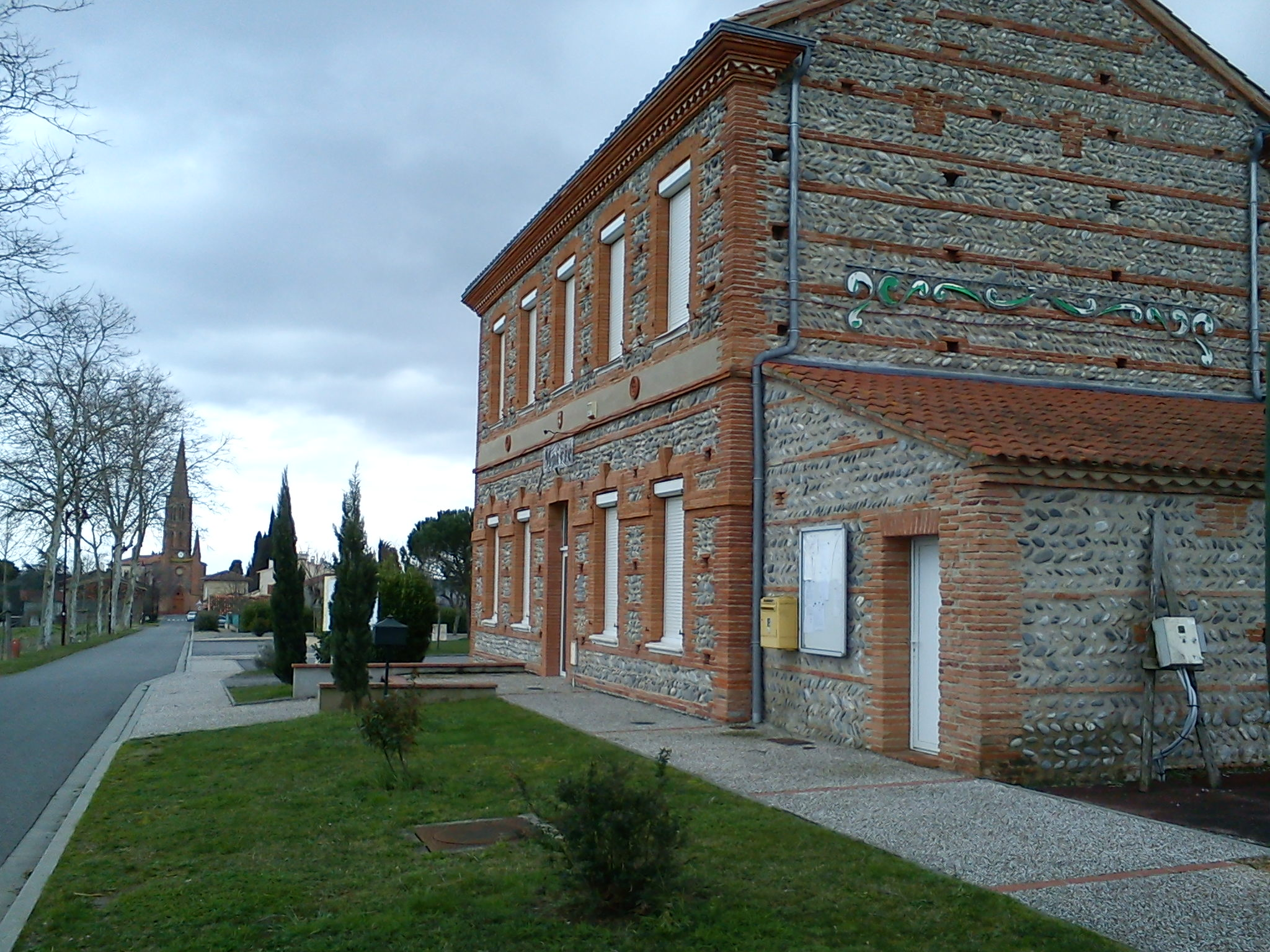
- Town hall

- Coat of arms
- Location of Montaut
- Location within France Location within Occitanie
- Coordinates: 43°21′22″N 1°17′28″E
- Country: France
- Region: Occitania
- Department: Haute-Garonne
- Arrondissement: Muret
- Canton: Auterive
- Intercommunality: Volvestre

Government
  - Mayor (2020–2026): Pierre Mario Viel
- Area^{1}: 17.88 km^{2} (6.90 sq mi)
- Elevation: 319 m (1,047 ft)
- Highest elevation: 301 m (988 ft)
- Lowest elevation: 175 m (574 ft)
- Population (2023): 578
  - Density: 32.3/km^{2} (83.7/sq mi)
- Time zone: UTC+01:00 (CET)
  - Summer (DST): UTC+02:00 (CEST)
- INSEE/Postal code: 31361 /31410
- ^{1} French Land Register data, which excludes lakes, ponds, glaciers > 1 km^{2} (0.386 sq mi or 247 acres) and river estuaries.

Montaut (French pronunciation: [mɔ̃to]) is a commune in the Haute-Garonne department of southwestern France.

== Geography ==
The Lèze flows north through the eastern part of the commune and forms part of its northeastern border.

The Garonne forms part of the commune's western border.

The commune is bordered by eight other communes: Mauzac to the north, Beaumont-sur-Lèze to the northwest, Auribail to the east, Saint-Sulpice-sur-Lèze to the southeast, Montgazin to the south, Marquefave to the southwest, Capens to the west, and finally by Noé to the northwest.

== Population ==
Historical population
Year	Pop.	±% p.a.
1968	250	—
1975	316	+3.40%
1982	362	+1.96%
1990	374	+0.41%
1999	440	+1.82%
2007	491	+1.38%
2012	519	+1.12%
2017	506	−0.51%
2023	578	+2.24%
Source: INSEE

== See also ==
- Communes of the Haute-Garonne department
