= Lacaugne =

- Commune
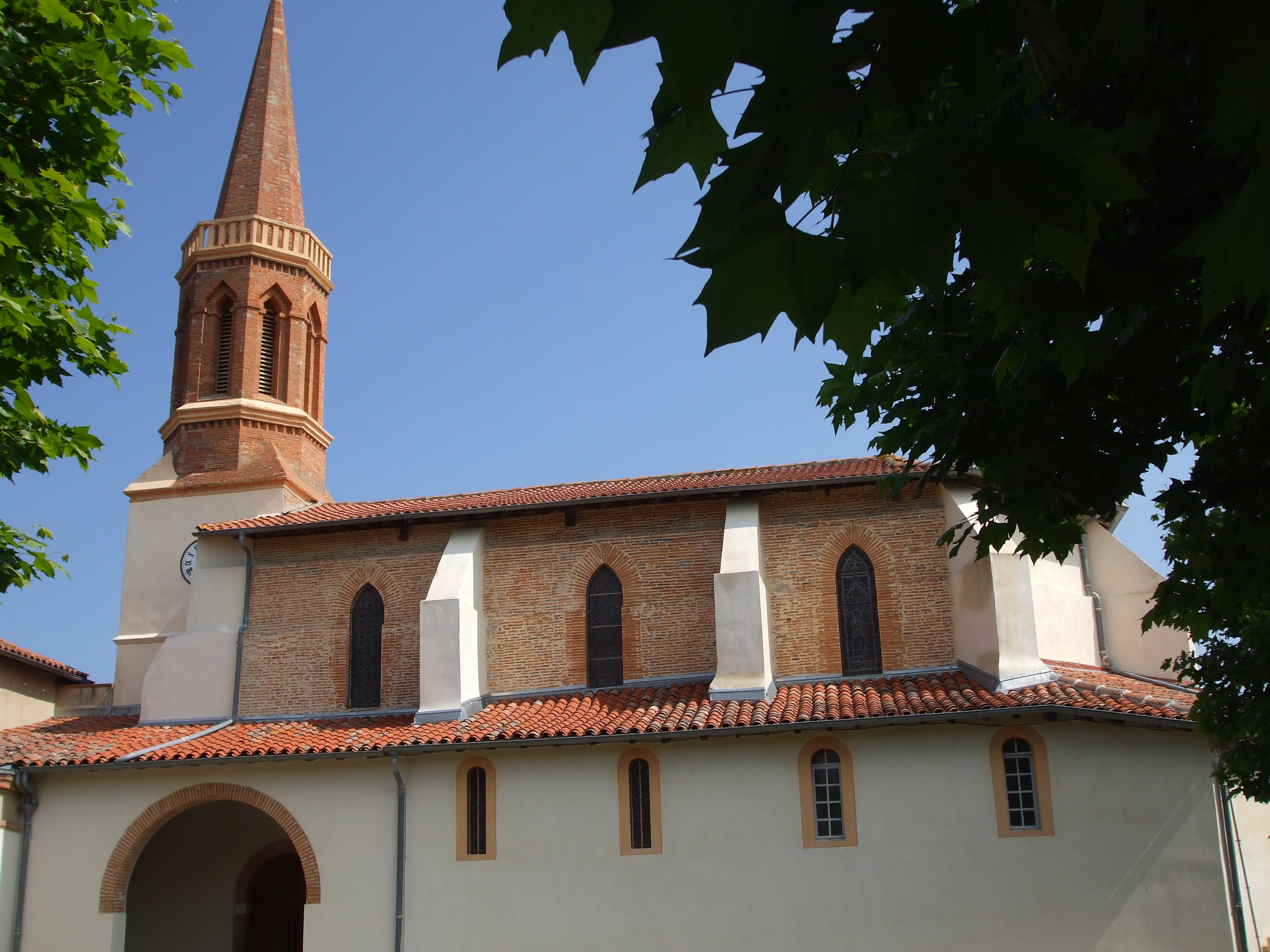
- The church in Lacaugne
- Location of Lacaugne
- Location within France Location within Occitanie
- Coordinates: 43°17′16″N 1°16′19″E
- Country: France
- Region: Occitania
- Department: Haute-Garonne
- Arrondissement: Muret
- Canton: Auterive
- Intercommunality: Volvestre

Government
  - Mayor (2020–2026): Jean-Marc Esquirol
- Area^{1}: 6.06 km^{2} (2.34 sq mi)
- Elevation: 302 m (991 ft)
- Highest elevation: 333 m (1,093 ft)
- Lowest elevation: 223 m (732 ft)
- Population (2023): 252
  - Density: 41.6/km^{2} (108/sq mi)
- Time zone: UTC+01:00 (CET)
  - Summer (DST): UTC+02:00 (CEST)
- INSEE/Postal code: 31258 /31390
- ^{1} French Land Register data, which excludes lakes, ponds, glaciers > 1 km^{2} (0.386 sq mi or 247 acres) and river estuaries.

Lacaugne (French pronunciation: [lakoɲ]; Occitan: La Caunha) is a commune in the Haute-Garonne department in southwestern France.

== Geography ==
The commune is bordered by five other communes, four of them is in Haute-Garonne, and one in Ariège: Marquefave to the north, Montgazin to the northeast, Latrape to the south, Carbonne to the west, and finally by the department of Ariège to the east by the commune of Lézat-sur-Lèze.

== Population ==
Historical population
Year	Pop.	±% p.a.
1968	154	—
1975	149	−0.47%
1982	179	+2.66%
1990	170	−0.64%
1999	168	−0.13%
2007	194	+1.81%
2012	200	+0.61%
2017	218	+1.74%
2023	252	+2.44%
Source: INSEE

== See also ==
Communes of the Haute-Garonne department
