= Capens =

- Commune
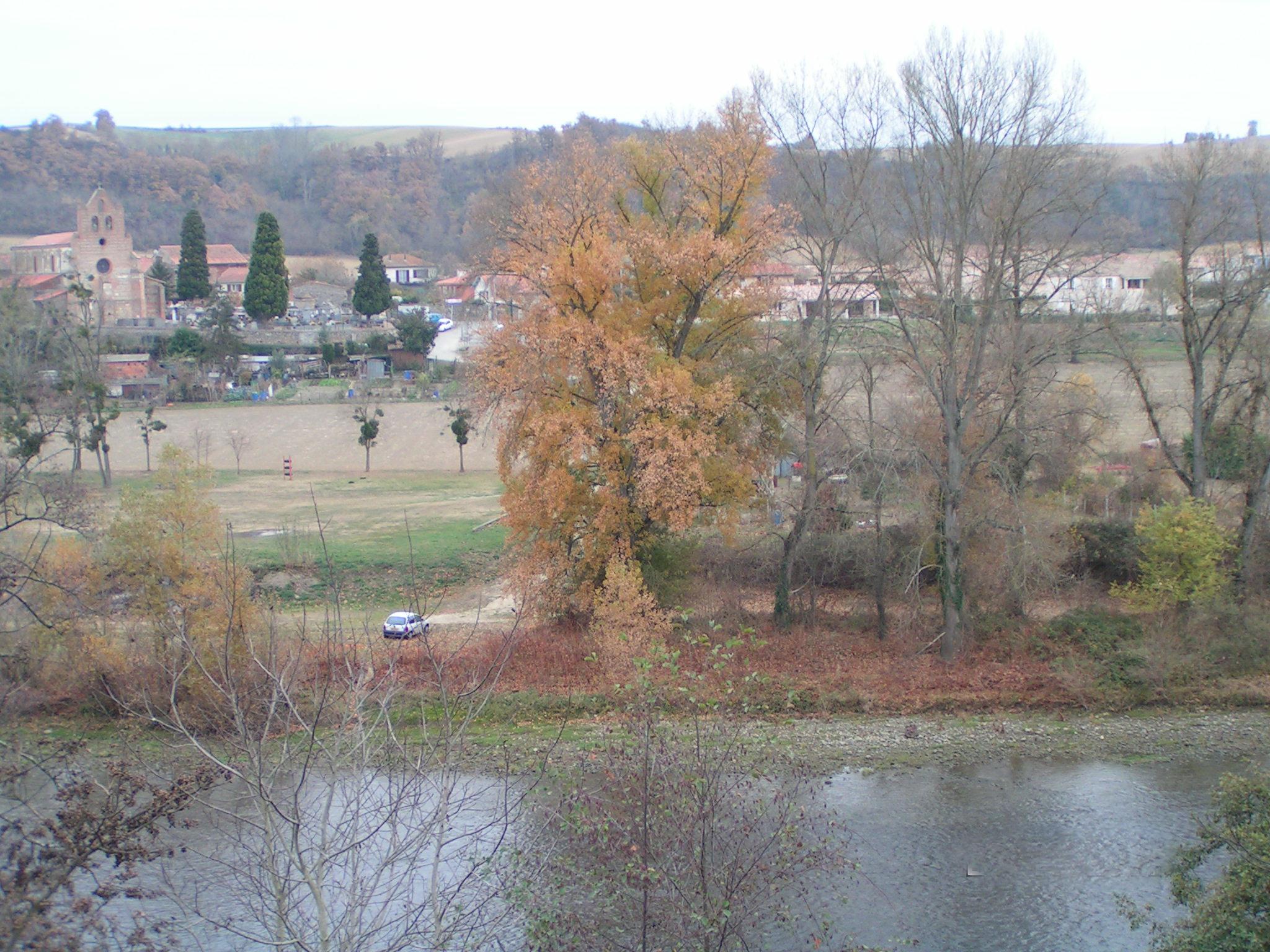
- A general view of Capens

- Coat of arms
- Location of Capens
- Location within France Location within Occitanie
- Coordinates: 43°20′16″N 1°15′37″E
- Country: France
- Region: Occitania
- Department: Haute-Garonne
- Arrondissement: Muret
- Canton: Auterive

Government
  - Mayor (2020–2026): Richard Danes
- Area^{1}: 6.77 km^{2} (2.61 sq mi)
- Elevation: 200 m (660 ft)
- Highest elevation: 290 m (950 ft)
- Lowest elevation: 174 m (571 ft)
- Population (2023): 637
  - Density: 94.1/km^{2} (244/sq mi)
- Time zone: UTC+01:00 (CET)
  - Summer (DST): UTC+02:00 (CEST)
- INSEE/Postal code: 31104 /31410
- ^{1} French Land Register data, which excludes lakes, ponds, glaciers > 1 km^{2} (0.386 sq mi or 247 acres) and river estuaries.

Capens (French pronunciation: [kapɛ̃s]) is a commune in the Haute-Garonne department in southwestern France.

== Geography ==
The village lies on the left banks of the Garonne river, which flows northeast through the middle of the commune.

The commune is bordered by five other communes: Noé to the north, Longages to the northwest, Carbonne to the west, Marquefave to the south, and finally by Montaut to the east.

== Population ==
Historical population
Year	Pop.	±% p.a.
1968	238	—
1975	247	+0.53%
1982	238	−0.53%
1990	253	+0.77%
1999	285	+1.33%
2007	462	+6.22%
2012	674	+7.85%
2017	662	−0.36%
2023	637	−0.64%
Source: INSEE

== See also ==
- Communes of the Haute-Garonne department
