= Mauzac, Haute-Garonne =

Mauzac
- Commune
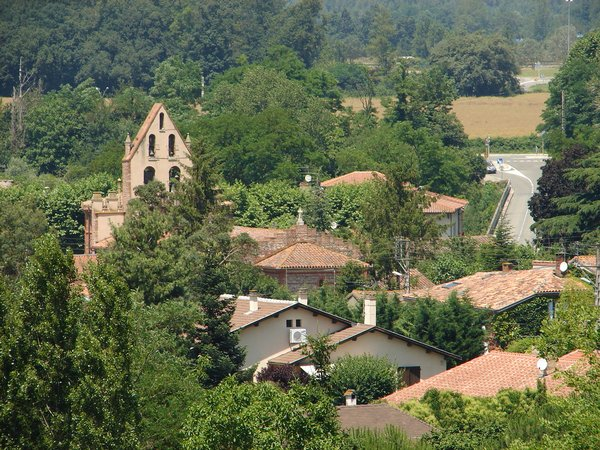
- A general view of Mauzac

- Coat of arms
- Location of Mauzac
- Location within France Location within Occitanie
- Coordinates: 43°22′34″N 1°17′32″E
- Country: France
- Region: Occitania
- Department: Haute-Garonne
- Arrondissement: Muret
- Canton: Auterive

Government
  - Mayor (2020–2026): Éric Salat
- Area^{1}: 9.27 km^{2} (3.58 sq mi)
- Elevation: 185 m (607 ft)
- Highest elevation: 285 m (935 ft)
- Lowest elevation: 165 m (541 ft)
- Population (2023): 1,351
  - Density: 146/km^{2} (377/sq mi)
- Time zone: UTC+01:00 (CET)
  - Summer (DST): UTC+02:00 (CEST)
- INSEE/Postal code: 31334 /31410
- ^{1} French Land Register data, which excludes lakes, ponds, glaciers > 1 km^{2} (0.386 sq mi or 247 acres) and river estuaries.

Mauzac (French pronunciation: [mozak]; Occitan: Mausac) is a commune in the Haute-Garonne department in southwestern France.

== Geography ==
The village lies on the middle banks of the Garonne river.

The commune is bordered by four other communes: Le Fauga to the north, Beaumont-sur-Lèze to the east, Montaut to the south, and finally by Noé to the west.

== Population ==
Historical population
Year	Pop.	±% p.a.
1968	318	—
1975	377	+2.46%
1982	489	+3.79%
1990	562	+1.75%
1999	682	+2.17%
2007	1,046	+5.49%
2012	1,195	+2.70%
2017	1,281	+1.40%
2023	1,351	+0.89%
Source: INSEE

== See also ==
- Communes of the Haute-Garonne department
