= Latrape =

- Commune
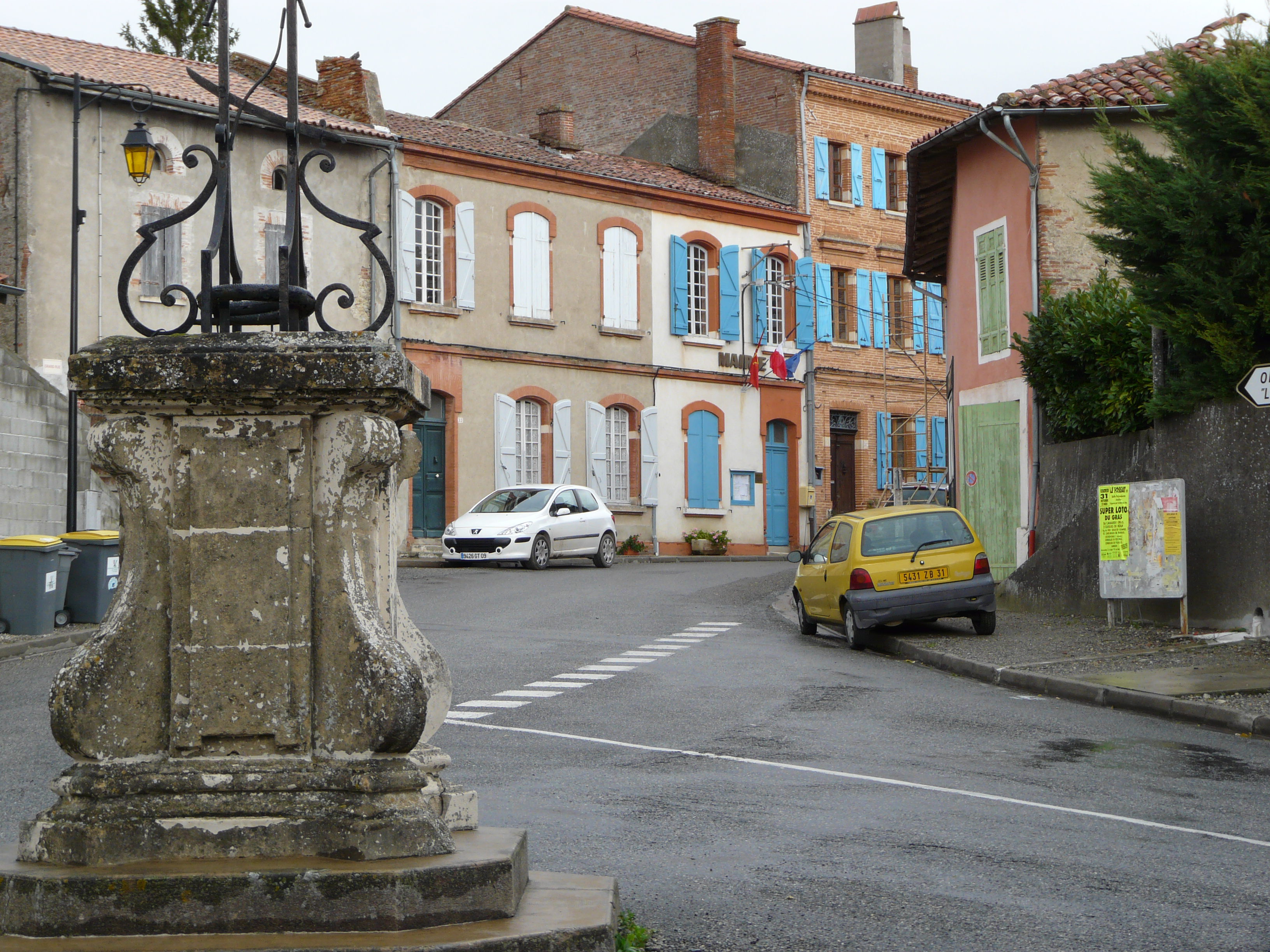
- Town hall
- Location of Latrape
- Location within France Location within Occitanie
- Coordinates: 43°14′45″N 1°17′22″E
- Country: France
- Region: Occitania
- Department: Haute-Garonne
- Arrondissement: Muret
- Canton: Auterive
- Intercommunality: Volvestre

Government
  - Mayor (2020–2026): Charles Naylies
- Area^{1}: 19.08 km^{2} (7.37 sq mi)
- Elevation: 354 m (1,161 ft)
- Highest elevation: 369 m (1,211 ft)
- Lowest elevation: 227 m (745 ft)
- Population (2023): 444
  - Density: 23.3/km^{2} (60.3/sq mi)
- Time zone: UTC+01:00 (CET)
  - Summer (DST): UTC+02:00 (CEST)
- INSEE/Postal code: 31280 /31310
- ^{1} French Land Register data, which excludes lakes, ponds, glaciers > 1 km^{2} (0.386 sq mi or 247 acres) and river estuaries.

Latrape (French pronunciation: [latʁap]; Occitan: La Trapa) is a commune in the Haute-Garonne department in southwestern France.

== Geography ==
The commune is bordered by eight other communes, seven of them is in Haute-Garonne, and one in Ariège: Lacaugne to the north, Carbonne and Rieux-Volvestre to the northwest, Castagnac to the east, Canens to the southeast, Bax to the south, Mailholas to the west, and finally by the department of Ariège to the northeast by the commune of Lézat-sur-Lèze.

== Population ==
Historical population
Year	Pop.	±% p.a.
1968	296	—
1975	222	−4.03%
1982	213	−0.59%
1990	212	−0.06%
1999	297	+3.82%
2007	346	+1.93%
2012	344	−0.12%
2017	364	+1.14%
2023	444	+3.37%
Source: INSEE

== See also ==
- Communes of the Haute-Garonne department
