= Castagnac =

- Commune
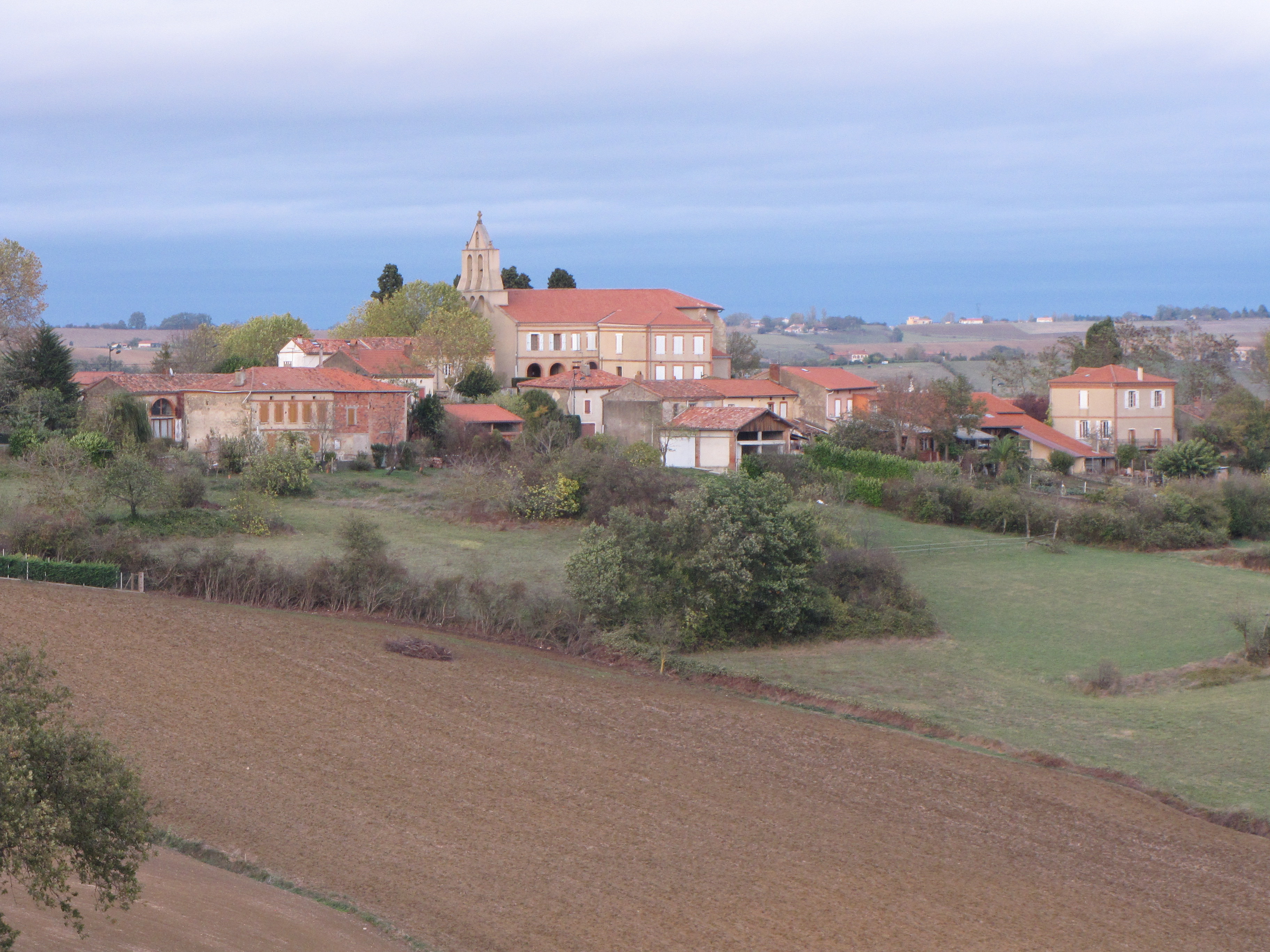
- A general view of Castagnac
- Location of Castagnac
- Location within France Location within Occitanie
- Coordinates: 43°13′30″N 1°21′04″E
- Country: France
- Region: Occitania
- Department: Haute-Garonne
- Arrondissement: Muret
- Canton: Auterive
- Intercommunality: Volvestre

Government
  - Mayor (2020–2026): Marie-Josée Varela
- Area^{1}: 10.77 km^{2} (4.16 sq mi)
- Elevation: 351 m (1,152 ft)
- Highest elevation: 363 m (1,191 ft)
- Lowest elevation: 217 m (712 ft)
- Population (2023): 325
  - Density: 30.2/km^{2} (78.2/sq mi)
- Time zone: UTC+01:00 (CET)
  - Summer (DST): UTC+02:00 (CEST)
- INSEE/Postal code: 31111 /31310
- ^{1} French Land Register data, which excludes lakes, ponds, glaciers > 1 km^{2} (0.386 sq mi or 247 acres) and river estuaries.

Castagnac (French pronunciation: [kastaɲak]; Occitan: Castanhac) is a commune in the Haute-Garonne department in southwestern France.

== Geography ==
The Lèze forms most of the commune's north-eastern border. There are numerous hiking routes.

The commune is bordered by five other communes, three of them is in Haute-Garonne, and two of them is in Ariège: Latrape to the west, Canens to the south, Massabrac to the southeast, and finally by the department of Ariège to the north and east by the communes of Lézat-sur-Lèze to the north and Saint-Ybars to the east.

== Population ==
Historical population
Year	Pop.	±% p.a.
1968	264	—
1975	212	−3.09%
1982	188	−1.70%
1990	161	−1.92%
1999	204	+2.67%
2007	278	+3.94%
2012	310	+2.20%
2017	288	−1.46%
2023	325	+2.03%
Source: INSEE

== Sights and monuments ==
- Château de Castagnac, medieval castle listed by the French Ministry of Culture as a monument historique since 18 March 2003.
- Gardens of the château.
- Windmill
- Église Saint-Sébastien, restored Gothic church

== See also ==
- Communes of the Haute-Garonne department
