= Arrondissement of Muret =

Coordinates: 43°27′N 1°20′E

Muret
- Arrondissement
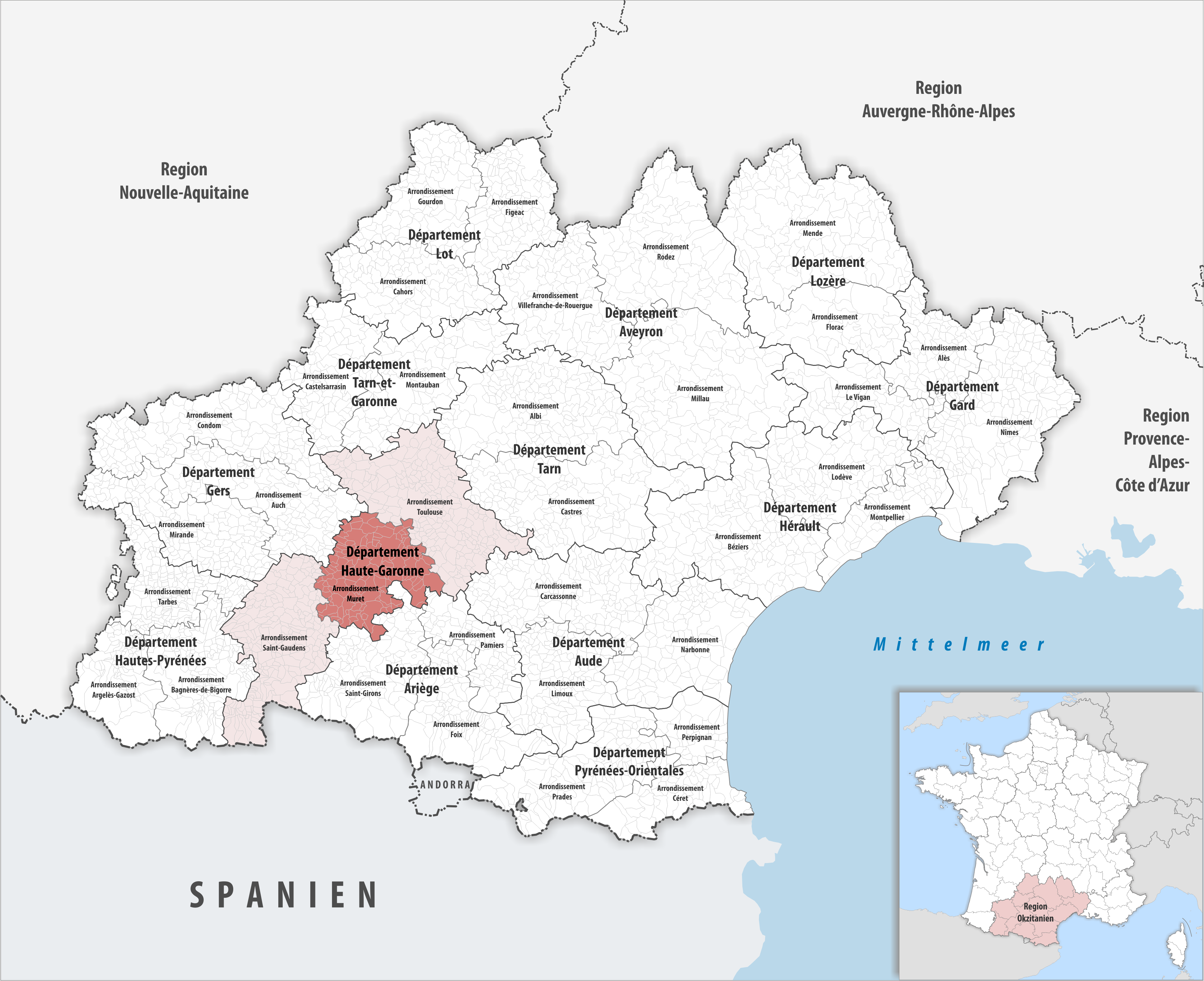
- Location within the region Occitanie
- Country: France
- Region: Occitania
- Department: Haute-Garonne
- No. of communes: {{{nbcomm}}}
- Area: 1,630.9 km^{2} (629.7 sq mi)
- Population (2023): 237,472
  - Density: 145.61/km^{2} (377.12/sq mi)
- INSEE code: 311

The arrondissement of Muret is an arrondissement of France in the Haute-Garonne department in the Occitanie region. It has 126 communes. Its population is 231,646 (2021), and its area is 1,630.9 km^{2} (629.7 sq mi). Its seat is in Muret.

== Composition ==
The communes of the arrondissement of Muret, and their INSEE codes, are:

1. Auragne (31024)
2. Auribail (31027)
3. Auterive (31033)
4. Bax (31047)
5. Beaufort (31051)
6. Beaumont-sur-Lèze (31052)
7. Bérat (31065)
8. Bois-de-la-Pierre (31071)
9. Bonrepos-sur-Aussonnelle (31075)
10. Boussens (31084)
11. Bragayrac (31087)
12. Cambernard (31101)
13. Canens (31103)
14. Capens (31104)
15. Carbonne (31107)
16. Castagnac (31111)
17. Castelnau-Picampeau (31119)
18. Casties-Labrande (31122)
19. Caujac (31128)
20. Cazères (31135)
21. Cintegabelle (31145)
22. Couladère (31153)
23. Eaunes (31165)
24. Empeaux (31166)
25. Esperce (31173)
26. Fonsorbes (31187)
27. Fontenilles (31188)
28. Forgues (31189)
29. Francon (31196)
30. Frouzins (31203)
31. Fustignac (31204)
32. Gaillac-Toulza (31206)
33. Gensac-sur-Garonne (31219)
34. Goutevernisse (31225)
35. Gouzens (31226)
36. Gratens (31229)
37. Grazac (31231)
38. Grépiac (31233)
39. Labarthe-sur-Lèze (31248)
40. Labastide-Clermont (31250)
41. Labastidette (31253)
42. Labruyère-Dorsa (31256)
43. Lacaugne (31258)
44. Lafitte-Vigordane (31261)
45. Lagardelle-sur-Lèze (31263)
46. Lagrâce-Dieu (31264)
47. Lahage (31266)
48. Lahitère (31267)
49. Lamasquère (31269)
50. Lapeyrère (31272)
51. Latour (31279)
52. Latrape (31280)
53. Lautignac (31283)
54. Lavelanet-de-Comminges (31286)
55. Lavernose-Lacasse (31287)
56. Le Fauga (31181)
57. Le Fousseret (31193)
58. Le Pin-Murelet (31419)
59. Le Plan (31425)
60. Lescuns (31292)
61. Lherm (31299)
62. Longages (31303)
63. Lussan-Adeilhac (31309)
64. Mailholas (31312)
65. Marignac-Lasclares (31317)
66. Marignac-Laspeyres (31318)
67. Marliac (31319)
68. Marquefave (31320)
69. Martres-Tolosane (31324)
70. Massabrac (31326)
71. Mauran (31327)
72. Mauressac (31330)
73. Mauzac (31334)
74. Miremont (31345)
75. Mondavezan (31349)
76. Monès (31353)
77. Montastruc-Savès (31359)
78. Montaut (31361)
79. Montberaud (31362)
80. Montbrun-Bocage (31365)
81. Montclar-de-Comminges (31367)
82. Montégut-Bourjac (31370)
83. Montesquieu-Volvestre (31375)
84. Montgazin (31379)
85. Montgras (31382)
86. Montoussin (31387)
87. Muret (The seat) (31395)
88. Noé (31399)
89. Palaminy (31406)
90. Peyssies (31416)
91. Pinsaguel (31420)
92. Pins-Justaret (31421)
93. Plagne (31422)
94. Plagnole (31423)
95. Polastron (31428)
96. Portet-sur-Garonne (31433)
97. Poucharramet (31435)
98. Pouy-de-Touges (31436)
99. Puydaniel (31442)
100. Rieumes (31454)
101. Rieux-Volvestre (31455)
102. Roques-sur-Garonne (31458)
103. Roquettes (31460)
104. Sabonnères (31464)
105. Saiguède (31466)
106. Saint-Araille (31469)
107. Saint-Christaud (31474)
108. Saint-Clar-de-Rivière (31475)
109. Sainte-Foy-de-Peyrolières (31481)
110. Saint-Élix-le-Château (31476)
111. Saint-Hilaire (31486)
112. Saint-Julien-sur-Garonne (31492)
113. Saint-Lys (31499)
114. Saint-Michel (31505)
115. Saint-Sulpice-sur-Lèze (31517)
116. Saint-Thomas (31518)
117. Sajas (31520)
118. Salles-sur-Garonne (31525)
119. Sana (31530)
120. Saubens (31533)
121. Savères (31538)
122. Sénarens (31543)
123. Seysses (31547)
124. Venerque (31572)
125. Vernet (31574)
126. Villate (31580)

== History ==
The arrondissement of Muret was created in 1800, abolished in 1803, restored in 1806, abolished again in 1926 and restored again in 1942. In January 2017 it gained the commune Auragne from the arrondissement of Toulouse, and it lost the commune Aignes to the arrondissement of Toulouse.

As a result of the reorganisation of the cantons of France which came into effect in 2015, the borders of the cantons are no longer related to the borders of the arrondissements. The cantons of the arrondissement of Muret were, as of January 2015:

1. Auterive
2. Carbonne
3. Cazères
4. Cintegabelle
5. Le Fousseret
6. Montesquieu-Volvestre
7. Muret
8. Portet-sur-Garonne
9. Rieumes
10. Rieux
11. Saint-Lys
