= Auribail =

- Commune
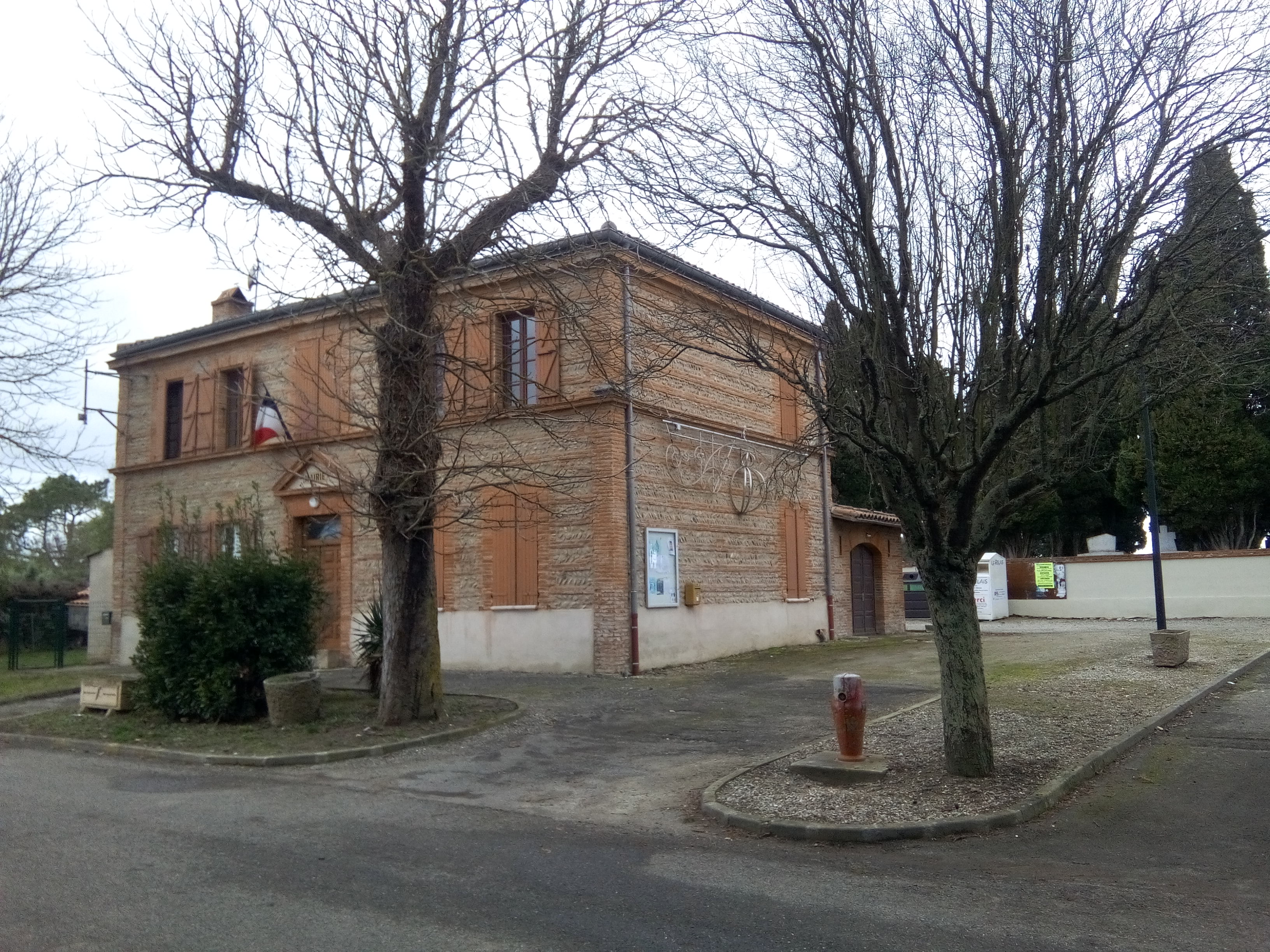
- The town hall in Auribail
- Location of Auribail
- Location within France Location within Occitanie
- Coordinates: 43°21′10″N 1°22′59″E
- Country: France
- Region: Occitania
- Department: Haute-Garonne
- Arrondissement: Muret
- Canton: Auterive
- Intercommunality: Bassin Auterivain Haut-Garonnais

Government
  - Mayor (2020–2026): Serge Marquier
- Area^{1}: 8.94 km^{2} (3.45 sq mi)
- Elevation: 280 m (920 ft)
- Highest elevation: 312 m (1,024 ft)
- Lowest elevation: 209 m (686 ft)
- Population (2023): 193
  - Density: 21.6/km^{2} (55.9/sq mi)
- Time zone: UTC+01:00 (CET)
  - Summer (DST): UTC+02:00 (CEST)
- INSEE/Postal code: 31027 /31190
- ^{1} French Land Register data, which excludes lakes, ponds, glaciers > 1 km^{2} (0.386 sq mi or 247 acres) and river estuaries.

Auribail (French pronunciation: [oʁibaj]; Occitan: Aurivalh) is a commune in the Haute-Garonne department in southwestern France.

== Geography ==
The commune is bordered by five other communes: Beaumont-sur-Lèze to the north, Miremont to the east, Lagrâce-Dieu to the southeast, Saint-Sulpice-sur-Lèze to the south, and finally by Montaut to the west.

== Population ==
Historical population
Year	Pop.	±% p.a.
1968	156	—
1975	138	−1.74%
1982	120	−1.98%
1990	137	+1.67%
1999	162	+1.88%
2007	219	+3.84%
2012	231	+1.07%
2017	204	−2.46%
2023	193	−0.92%
Source: INSEE

== See also ==
- Communes of the Haute-Garonne department
