= Lagrâce-Dieu =

- Commune
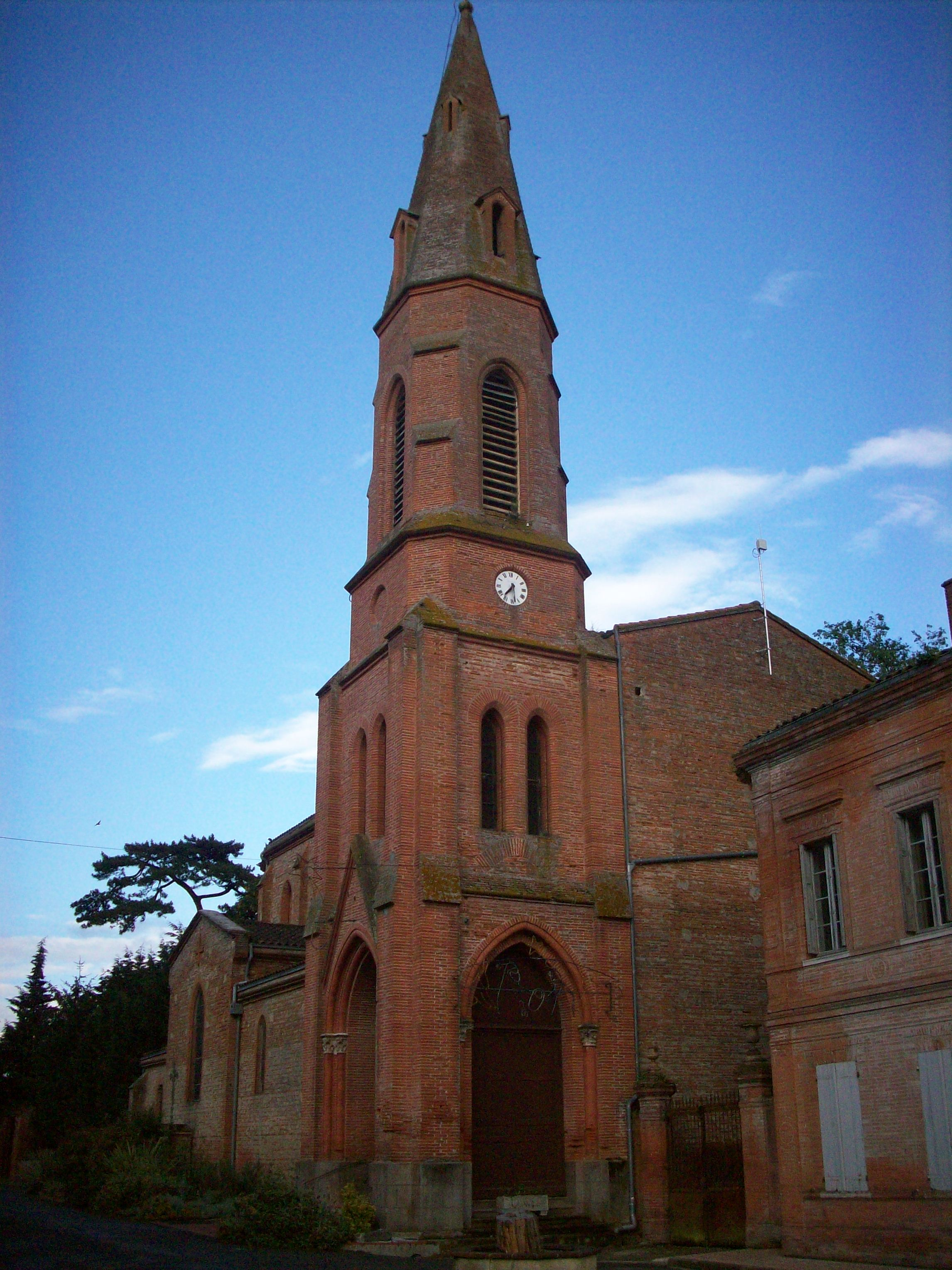
- The church in Lagrâce-Dieu
- Location of Lagrâce-Dieu
- Location within France Location within Occitanie
- Coordinates: 43°20′25″N 1°25′18″E
- Country: France
- Region: Occitania
- Department: Haute-Garonne
- Arrondissement: Muret
- Canton: Auterive

Government
  - Mayor (2020–2026): Joël Cazajus
- Area^{1}: 8.52 km^{2} (3.29 sq mi)
- Elevation: 225 m (738 ft)
- Highest elevation: 321 m (1,053 ft)
- Lowest elevation: 181 m (594 ft)
- Population (2023): 551
  - Density: 64.7/km^{2} (167/sq mi)
- Time zone: UTC+01:00 (CET)
  - Summer (DST): UTC+02:00 (CEST)
- INSEE/Postal code: 31264 /31190
- ^{1} French Land Register data, which excludes lakes, ponds, glaciers > 1 km^{2} (0.386 sq mi or 247 acres) and river estuaries.

Lagrâce-Dieu (French pronunciation: [laɡʁas djø]; Occitan: La Gràcia de Dieu) is a commune in the Haute-Garonne department in southwestern France.

== Geography ==
The commune is bordered by six other communes: Miremont to the north, Auterive to the east, Puydaniel to the south, Esperce to the southwest, Saint-Sulpice-sur-Lèze to the west, and finally by Auribail to the northwest.

== Population ==
Historical population
Year	Pop.	±% p.a.
1968	205	—
1975	207	+0.14%
1982	201	−0.42%
1990	247	+2.61%
1999	269	+0.95%
2007	385	+4.58%
2012	518	+6.11%
2017	571	+1.97%
2023	551	−0.59%
Source: INSEE

== See also ==
Communes of the Haute-Garonne department
