= Miremont, Haute-Garonne =

Miremont
- Commune
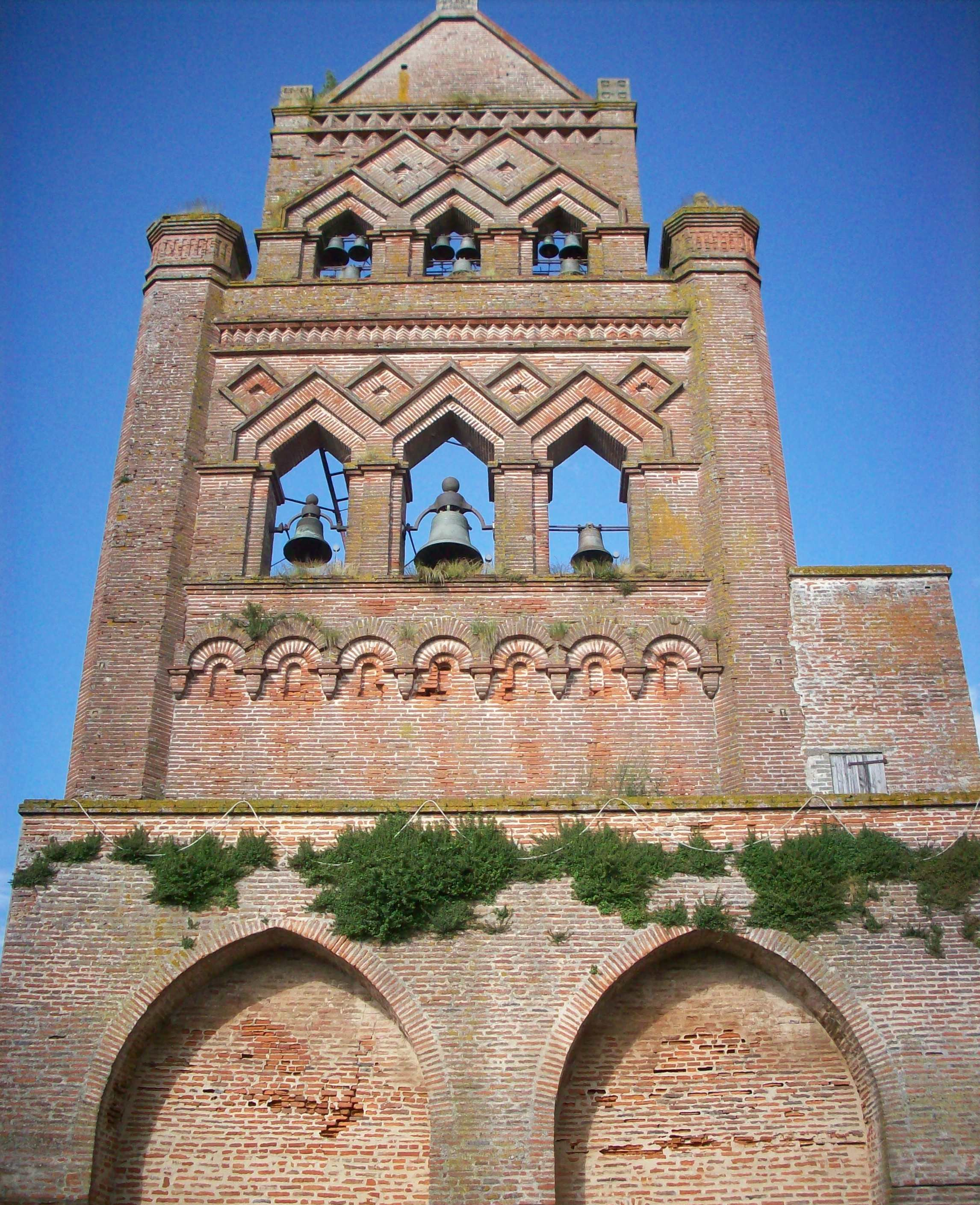
- The church in Miremont

- Coat of arms
- Location of Miremont
- Location within France Location within Occitanie
- Coordinates: 43°22′16″N 1°25′05″E
- Country: France
- Region: Occitania
- Department: Haute-Garonne
- Arrondissement: Muret
- Canton: Auterive

Government
  - Mayor (2020–2026): Serge Baurens
- Area^{1}: 22.4 km^{2} (8.6 sq mi)
- Elevation: 178 m (584 ft)
- Highest elevation: 291 m (955 ft)
- Lowest elevation: 167 m (548 ft)
- Population (2023): 2,838
  - Density: 127/km^{2} (328/sq mi)
- Time zone: UTC+01:00 (CET)
  - Summer (DST): UTC+02:00 (CEST)
- INSEE/Postal code: 31345 /31190
- ^{1} French Land Register data, which excludes lakes, ponds, glaciers > 1 km^{2} (0.386 sq mi or 247 acres) and river estuaries.

Miremont (French pronunciation: [miʁmɔ̃]; Occitan: Miramont) is a commune in the Haute-Garonne department in southwestern France.

== Geography ==
The commune is bordered by seven other communes: Vernet to the north, Grépiac across the river Ariège to the northeast, Auterive to the east, Lagrâce-Dieu to the south, Auribail to the southwest, Beaumont-sur-Lèze to the west, and finally by Lagardelle-sur-Lèze to the northwest.

The river Ariège flows through the commune, forming a border with Grépiac.

== Population ==
Historical population
Year	Pop.	±% p.a.
1968	811	—
1975	866	+0.94%
1982	1,078	+3.18%
1990	1,217	+1.53%
1999	1,445	+1.93%
2007	1,902	+3.49%
2012	2,223	+3.17%
2017	2,494	+2.33%
2023	2,838	+2.18%
Source: INSEE

== See also ==
- Communes of the Haute-Garonne department
