= Marquefave =

- Commune
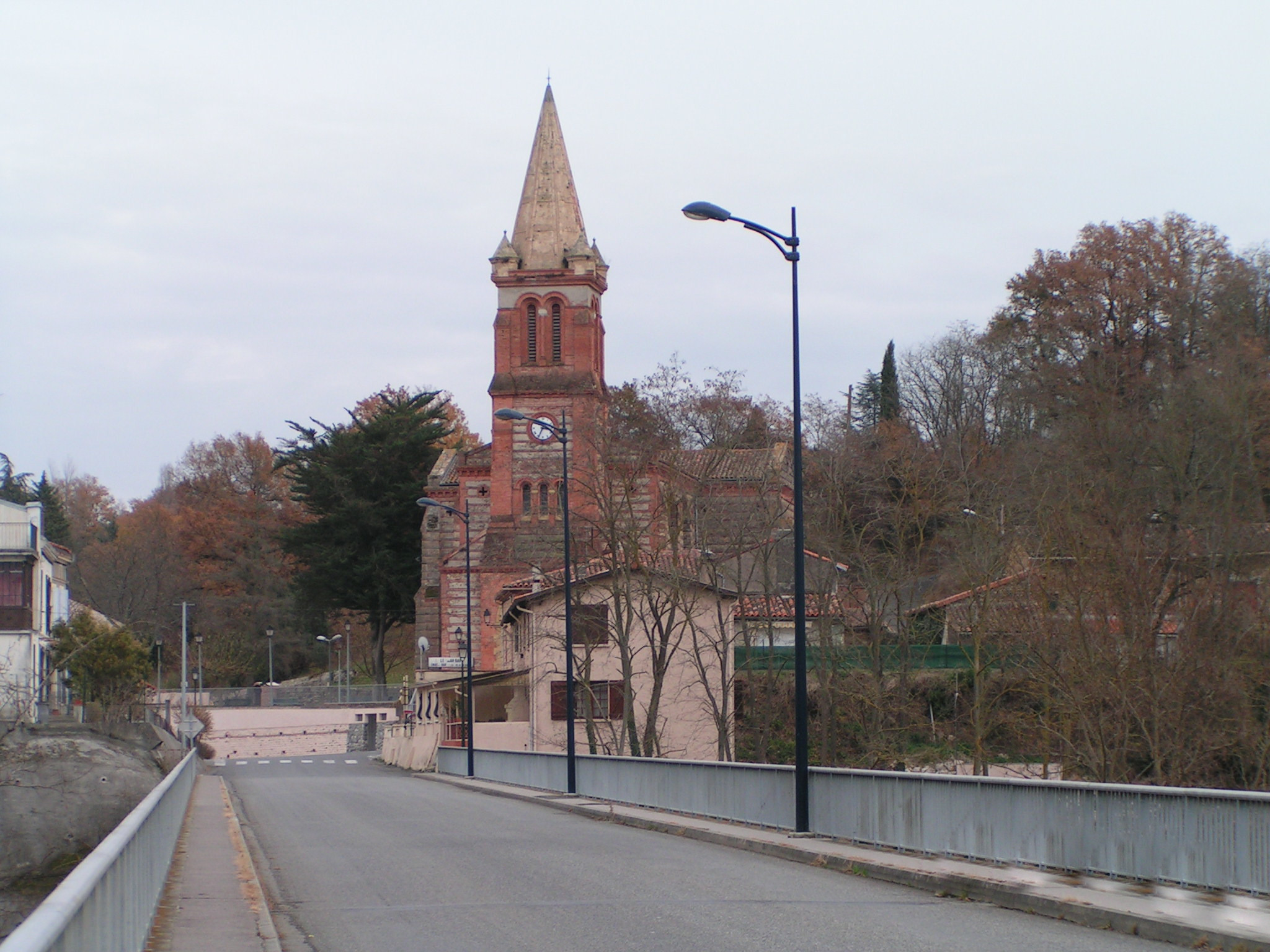
- The church in Marquefave
- Location of Marquefave
- Location within France Location within Occitanie
- Coordinates: 43°19′05″N 1°14′50″E
- Country: France
- Region: Occitania
- Department: Haute-Garonne
- Arrondissement: Muret
- Canton: Auterive
- Intercommunality: Volvestre

Government
  - Mayor (2020–2026): Éric Payen
- Area^{1}: 18.92 km^{2} (7.31 sq mi)
- Elevation: 207 m (679 ft)
- Highest elevation: 323 m (1,060 ft)
- Lowest elevation: 175 m (574 ft)
- Population (2023): 991
  - Density: 52.4/km^{2} (136/sq mi)
- Time zone: UTC+01:00 (CET)
  - Summer (DST): UTC+02:00 (CEST)
- INSEE/Postal code: 31320 /31390
- ^{1} French Land Register data, which excludes lakes, ponds, glaciers > 1 km^{2} (0.386 sq mi or 247 acres) and river estuaries.

Marquefave (French pronunciation: [maʁkəfav]; Occitan: Marcahava) is a commune in the Haute-Garonne department in southwestern France.

== Geography ==
The village lies on the banks of the Garonne river.

The commune is bordered by five other communes: Capens across the river Garonne and the land border to the north, Montaut to the northwest, Montgazin to the east, Lacaugne to the south, and finally by Carbonne across the river Garonne to the west.

== Population ==
Historical population
Year	Pop.	±% p.a.
1968	570	—
1975	535	−0.90%
1982	632	+2.41%
1990	772	+2.53%
1999	850	+1.08%
2007	995	+1.99%
2012	1,016	+0.42%
2017	967	−0.98%
2023	991	+0.41%
Source: INSEE

== See also ==
- Communes of the Haute-Garonne department
