= Auterive, Haute-Garonne =

Auterive Autariba (Occitan)
- Commune
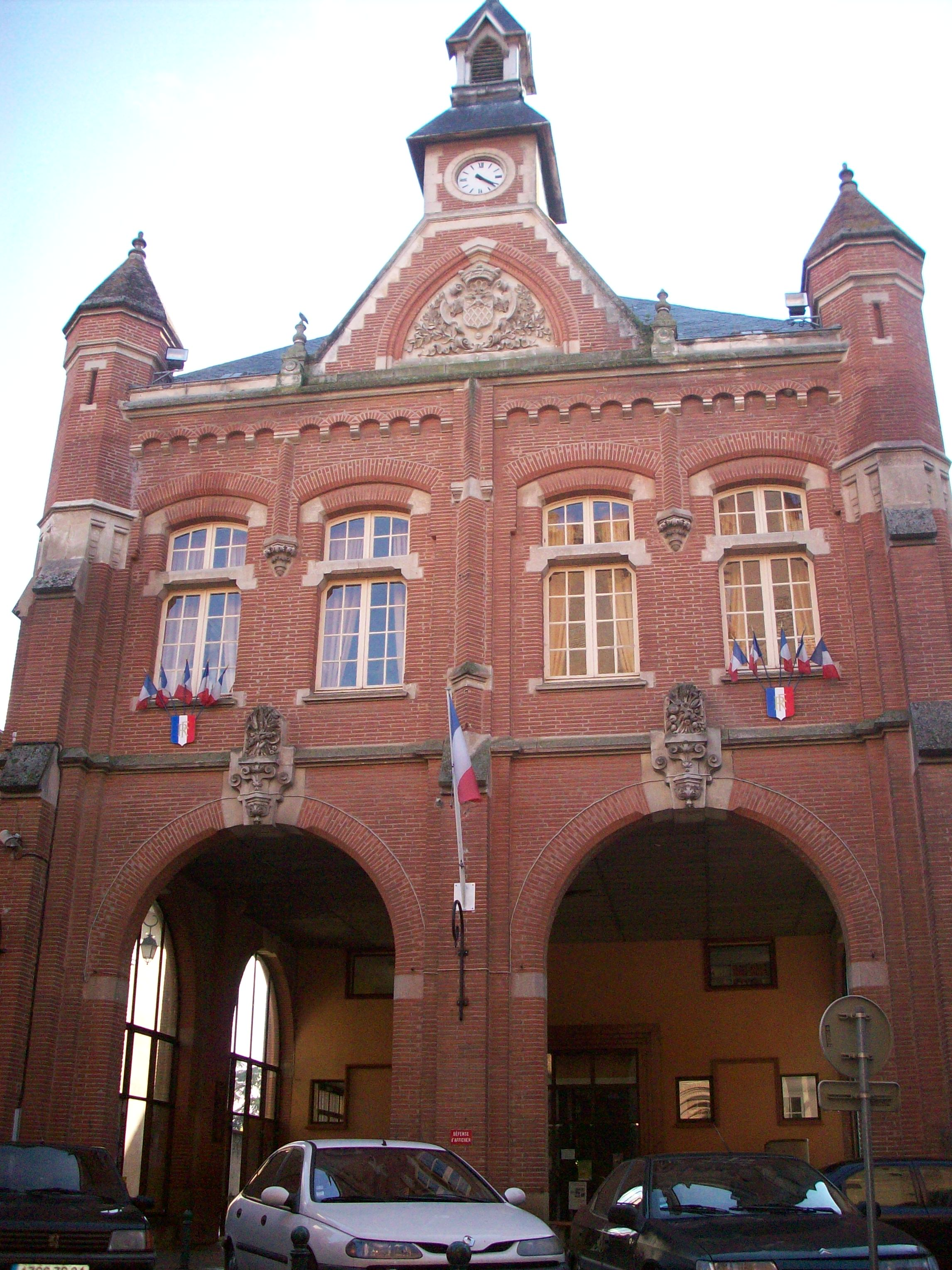
- Town hall

- Coat of arms
- Location of Auterive
- Location within France Location within Occitanie
- Coordinates: 43°21′05″N 1°28′31″E
- Country: France
- Region: Occitania
- Department: Haute-Garonne
- Arrondissement: Muret
- Canton: Auterive
- Intercommunality: Bassin Auterivain Haut-Garonnais

Government
  - Mayor (2020–2026): René Azema
- Area^{1}: 36.54 km^{2} (14.11 sq mi)
- Elevation: 185 m (607 ft)
- Highest elevation: 292 m (958 ft)
- Lowest elevation: 165 m (541 ft)
- Population (2023): 10,456
  - Density: 286.2/km^{2} (741.1/sq mi)
- Time zone: UTC+01:00 (CET)
  - Summer (DST): UTC+02:00 (CEST)
- INSEE/Postal code: 31033 /31190
- ^{1} French Land Register data, which excludes lakes, ponds, glaciers > 1 km^{2} (0.386 sq mi or 247 acres) and river estuaries.

Auterive (French pronunciation: [otʁiv]; Occitan: Autariba) is a commune in the Haute-Garonne department in southwestern France. Auterive station has rail connections to Toulouse, Foix and Latour-de-Carol. It is the seat (capital) of the canton of Auterive.

== Geography ==
The town lies on the eastern banks of the Ariège river.

The commune is bordered by eleven other communes: Grépiac and Labruyère-Dorsa to the north, Miremont to the northwest, Auragne to the northeast, Mauvaisin to the east, Cintegabelle to the southeast, Caujac to the south, Mauressac and Grazac to the southwest, and finally by Lagrâce-Dieu and Puydaniel to the west.

== Population ==
The inhabitants of the commune are known as Auterivains in French.

Historical population

Year	Pop.	±% p.a.
1793	1,975	—
1800	2,895	+5.62%
1806	2,802	−0.54%
1821	2,850	+0.11%
1831	3,172	+1.08%
1836	3,075	−0.62%
1841	3,272	+1.25%
1846	3,276	+0.02%
1851	3,443	+1.00%
1856	3,292	−0.89%
1861	3,297	+0.03%
1866	3,313	+0.10%
1872	3,158	−0.80%
1876	2,944	−1.74%
1881	2,945	+0.01%
1886	2,981	+0.24%
1891	2,791	−1.31%
1896	2,807	+0.11%
1901	2,623	−1.35%

Year	Pop.	±% p.a.
1906	2,563	−0.46%
1911	2,551	−0.09%
1921	2,353	−0.80%
1926	2,509	+1.29%
1931	2,387	−0.99%
1936	2,513	+1.03%
1946	2,593	+0.31%
1954	2,775	+0.85%
1962	3,133	+1.53%
1968	4,445	+6.00%
1975	5,178	+2.20%
1982	5,436	+0.70%
1990	5,814	+0.84%
1999	6,531	+1.30%
2007	8,435	+3.25%
2012	9,275	+1.92%
2017	9,752	+1.01%
2023	10,456	+1.17%

Source: EHESS and INSEE (1968-2023)

== International relationships ==
Auterive is twinned with:

- Arenys de Mar, Spain
- Fontanelle, Italy
- Südheide, Germany
- Marsa, Malta

== See also ==
- Communes of the Haute-Garonne department
