= Grépiac =

- Commune
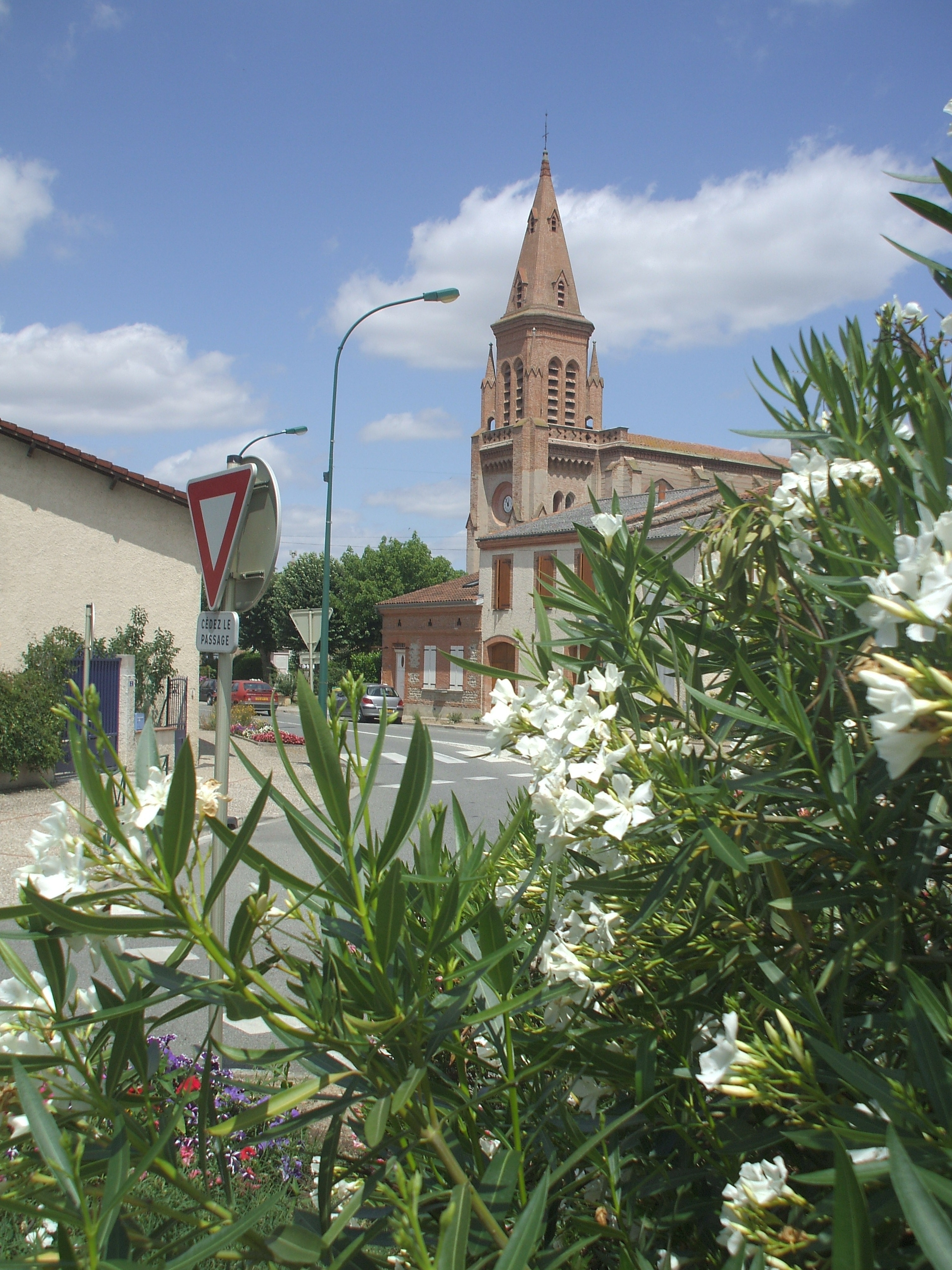
- The church in Grépiac
- Location of Grépiac
- Location within France Location within Occitanie
- Coordinates: 43°24′21″N 1°26′57″E
- Country: France
- Region: Occitania
- Department: Haute-Garonne
- Arrondissement: Muret
- Canton: Auterive

Government
  - Mayor (2020–2026): Céline Gabriel
- Area^{1}: 8.18 km^{2} (3.16 sq mi)
- Elevation: 185 m (607 ft)
- Highest elevation: 243 m (797 ft)
- Lowest elevation: 163 m (535 ft)
- Population (2023): 1,017
  - Density: 124/km^{2} (322/sq mi)
- Time zone: UTC+01:00 (CET)
  - Summer (DST): UTC+02:00 (CEST)
- INSEE/Postal code: 31233 /31190
- ^{1} French Land Register data, which excludes lakes, ponds, glaciers > 1 km^{2} (0.386 sq mi or 247 acres) and river estuaries.

Grépiac (French pronunciation: [ɡʁepjak]; Occitan: Grepiac) is a commune in the Haute-Garonne department in southwestern France.

== Geography ==
The commune is bordered by six other communes: Venerque to the north, Vernet to the northwest, Issus to the northeast, Labruyère-Dorsa to the east, Auterive to the south, and finally by Miremont across the Ariège river to the southwest.

The river Ariège flows through the commune, forming a border with Miremont.

== Population ==
Historical population
Year	Pop.	±% p.a.
1968	432	—
1975	588	+4.50%
1982	647	+1.38%
1990	681	+0.64%
1999	791	+1.68%
2007	971	+2.60%
2012	1,004	+0.67%
2017	982	−0.44%
2023	1,017	+0.59%
Source: INSEE

== See also ==
Communes of the Haute-Garonne department
