= Montbrun-Bocage =

- Commune
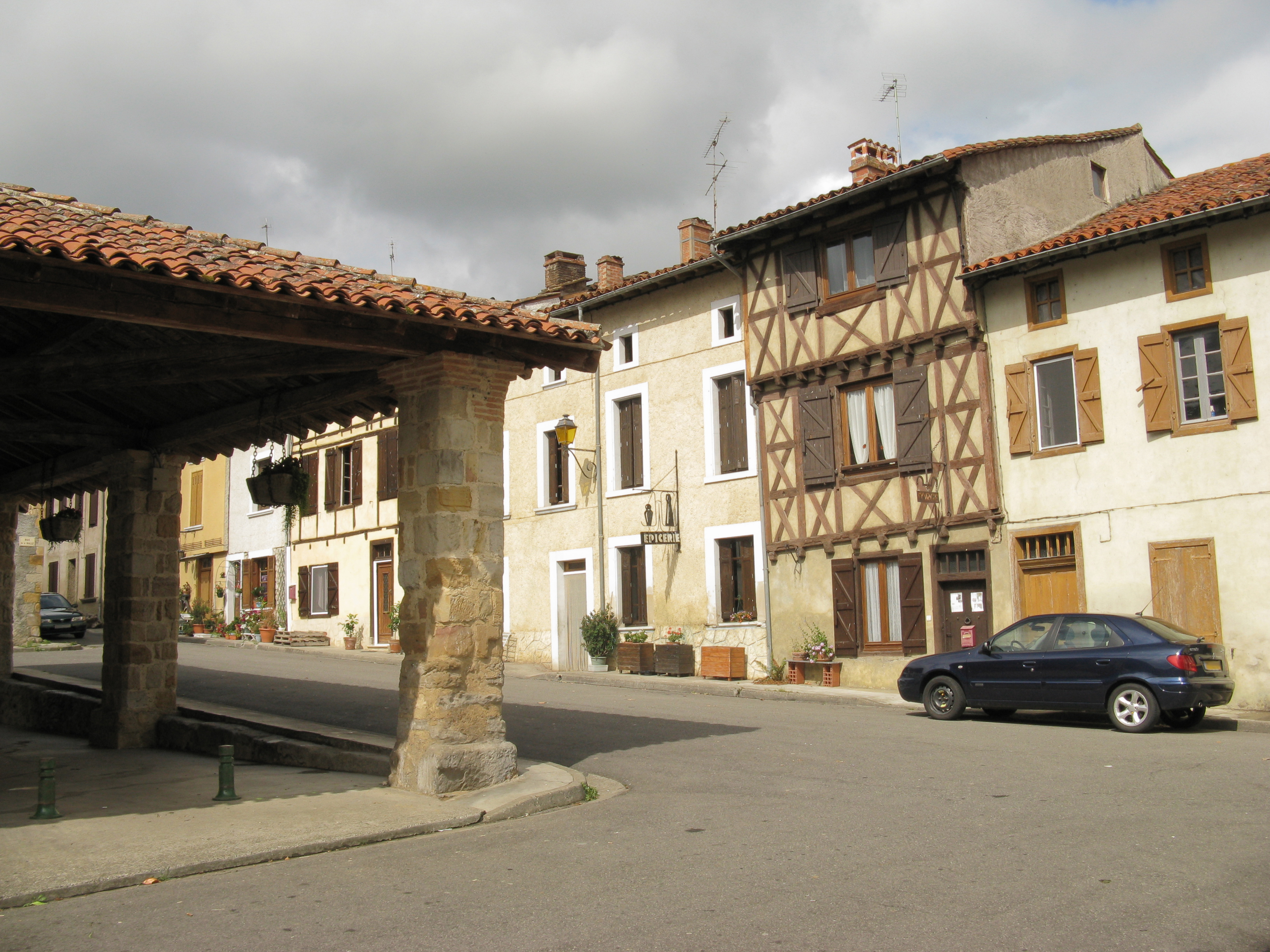
- Marketplace
- Location of Montbrun-Bocage
- Location within France Location within Occitanie
- Coordinates: 43°07′45″N 1°16′03″E
- Country: France
- Region: Occitania
- Department: Haute-Garonne
- Arrondissement: Muret
- Canton: Auterive
- Intercommunality: Volvestre

Government
  - Mayor (2020–2026): Christian Seneclauze
- Area^{1}: 30.61 km^{2} (11.82 sq mi)
- Elevation: 320 m (1,050 ft)
- Highest elevation: 523 m (1,716 ft)
- Lowest elevation: 259 m (850 ft)
- Population (2023): 592
  - Density: 19.3/km^{2} (50.1/sq mi)
- Time zone: UTC+01:00 (CET)
  - Summer (DST): UTC+02:00 (CEST)
- INSEE/Postal code: 31365 /31310
- ^{1} French Land Register data, which excludes lakes, ponds, glaciers > 1 km^{2} (0.386 sq mi or 247 acres) and river estuaries.

Montbrun-Bocage (French pronunciation: [mɔ̃bʁœ̃ bɔkaʒ]; Occitan: Montbrun del Boscatge) is a commune in the Haute-Garonne department of southwestern France.

== Population ==
Historical population
Year	Pop.	±% p.a.
1968	454	—
1975	386	−2.29%
1982	356	−1.15%
1990	336	−0.72%
1999	373	+1.17%
2007	435	+1.94%
2012	482	+2.07%
2017	476	−0.25%
2023	592	+3.70%
Source: INSEE

== See also ==
- Communes of the Haute-Garonne department
