= Communes of the Haute-Garonne department =

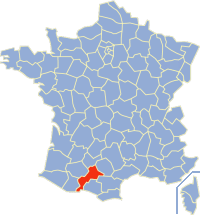

The following is a list of the 586 communes in the French department of Haute-Garonne.

The communes cooperate in the following intercommunalities (as of 2025):

- Toulouse Métropole
- CA Le Muretain Agglo
- Communauté d'agglomération du Sicoval
- Communauté de communes du Bassin Auterivain Haut-Garonnais
- Communauté de communes Cagire Garonne Salat
- Communauté de communes Cœur de Garonne
- Communauté de communes Cœur et Coteaux du Comminges
- Communauté de communes des Coteaux Bellevue
- Communauté de communes des Coteaux du Girou
- Communauté de communes du Frontonnais
- Communauté de communes Le Grand Ouest Toulousain
- Communauté de communes des Hauts Tolosans
- Communauté de communes des Pyrénées Haut-Garonnaises
- Communauté de communes aux sources du Canal du Midi (partly)
- Communauté de communes Tarn-Agout (partly)
- Communauté de communes des Terres du Lauragais
- Communauté de communes Val'Aïgo
- Communauté de communes du Volvestre

INSEE code	Postal code	Commune
31001	31230	Agassac
31002	31550	Aignes
31003	31280	Aigrefeuille
31005	31420	Alan
31006	31460	Albiac
31007	31230	Ambax
31008	31230	Anan
31009	31510	Antichan-de-Frontignes
31010	31110	Antignac
31011	31160	Arbas
31012	31160	Arbon
31013	31210	Ardiège
31014	31160	Arguenos
31015	31440	Argut-Dessous
31017	31440	Arlos
31018	31360	Arnaud-Guilhem
31019	31110	Artigue
31020	31160	Aspet
31021	31800	Aspret-Sarrat
31022	31140	Aucamville
31023	31420	Aulon
31024	31190	Auragne
31025	31320	Aureville
31026	31460	Auriac-sur-Vendinelle
31027	31190	Auribail
31028	31420	Aurignac
31029	31570	Aurin
31030	31260	Ausseing
31031	31210	Ausson
31032	31840	Aussonne
31033	31190	Auterive
31034	31360	Auzas
31035	31320	Auzeville-Tolosane
31036	31650	Auzielle
31037	31290	Avignonet-Lauragais
31004	31450	Ayguesvives
31038	31380	Azas
31039	31420	Bachas
31040	31440	Bachos
31041	31510	Bagiry
31042	31110	Bagnères-de-Luchon
31043	31580	Balesta
31044	31130	Balma
31045	31510	Barbazan
31046	31440	Baren
31047	31310	Bax
31048	31450	Baziège
31049	31380	Bazus
31050	31360	Beauchalot
31051	31370	Beaufort
31052	31870	Beaumont-sur-Lèze
31053	31850	Beaupuy
31054	31290	Beauteville
31055	31460	Beauville
31056	31700	Beauzelle
31057	31450	Belberaud
31058	31450	Belbèze-de-Lauragais
31059	31260	Belbèze-en-Comminges
31060	31540	Bélesta-en-Lauragais
31061	31530	Bellegarde-Sainte-Marie
31062	31480	Bellesserre
31063	31420	Benque
31064	31110	Benque-Dessous-et-Dessus
31065	31370	Bérat
31066	31660	Bessières
31067	31440	Bezins-Garraux
31068	31110	Billière
31590	31440	Binos
31069	31700	Blagnac
31070	31350	Blajan
31071	31390	Bois-de-la-Pierre
31072	31230	Boissède
31073	31340	Bondigoux
31074	31590	Bonrepos-Riquet
31075	31470	Bonrepos-sur-Aussonnelle
31076	31210	Bordes-de-Rivière
31077	31340	Le Born
31078	31580	Boudrac
31079	31620	Bouloc
31080	31350	Boulogne-sur-Gesse
31081	31110	Bourg-d'Oueil
31082	31570	Bourg-Saint-Bernard
31083	31420	Boussan
31084	31360	Boussens
31085	31440	Boutx
31086	31420	Bouzin
31087	31470	Bragayrac
31088	31490	Brax
31089	31530	Bretx
31090	31480	Brignemont
31091	31150	Bruguières
31092	31440	Burgalays
31093	31330	Le Burgaud
31094	31660	Buzet-sur-Tarn
31095	31160	Cabanac-Cazaux
31096	31480	Cabanac-Séguenville
31097	31460	Le Cabanial
31098	31480	Cadours
31099	31560	Caignac
31100	31560	Calmont
31101	31470	Cambernard
31102	31460	Cambiac
31103	31310	Canens
31104	31410	Capens
31105	31460	Caragoudes
31106	31460	Caraman
31107	31390	Carbonne
31108	31350	Cardeilhac
31109	31420	Cassagnabère-Tournas
31110	31260	Cassagne
31111	31310	Castagnac
31112	31260	Castagnède
31113	31320	Castanet-Tolosan
31114	31160	Castelbiague
31115	31230	Castelgaillard
31116	31780	Castelginest
31117	31180	Castelmaurou
31118	31620	Castelnau-d'Estrétefonds
31119	31430	Castelnau-Picampeau
31120	31530	Le Castéra
31121	31350	Castéra-Vignoles
31122	31430	Casties-Labrande
31123	31110	Castillon-de-Larboust
31124	31360	Castillon-de-Saint-Martory
31125	31110	Cathervielle
31126	31480	Caubiac
31127	31110	Caubous
31128	31190	Caujac
31593	31230	Cazac
31129	31110	Cazarilh-Laspènes
31130	31580	Cazaril-Tambourès
31131	31160	Cazaunous
31132	31440	Cazaux-Layrisse
31133	31110	Cazeaux-de-Larboust
31134	31420	Cazeneuve-Montaut
31135	31220	Cazères
31136	31620	Cépet
31137	31290	Cessales
31138	31350	Charlas
31139	31440	Chaum
31140	31160	Chein-Dessus
31141	31350	Ciadoux
31142	31110	Cier-de-Luchon
31143	31510	Cier-de-Rivière
31144	31440	Cierp-Gaud
31145	31550	Cintegabelle
31146	31110	Cirès
31147	31210	Clarac
31148	31810	Clermont-le-Fort
31149	31770	Colomiers
31150	31700	Cornebarrieu
31151	31450	Corronsac
31152	31230	Coueilles
31153	31220	Couladère
31155	31160	Couret
31156	31480	Cox
31157	31270	Cugnaux
31158	31210	Cuguron
31159	31210	Le Cuing
31160	31700	Daux
31161	31450	Deyme
31162	31450	Donneville
31163	31280	Drémil-Lafage
31164	31480	Drudas
31165	31600	Eaunes
31166	31470	Empeaux
31167	31160	Encausse-les-Thermes
31168	31420	Eoux
31169	31750	Escalquens
31170	31350	Escanecrabe
31591	31260	Escoulis
31171	31450	Espanès
31172	31420	Esparron
31173	31190	Esperce
31174	31160	Estadens
31175	31800	Estancarbon
31176	31440	Esténos
31177	31440	Eup
31178	31230	Fabas
31179	31460	Le Faget
31180	31540	Falga
31181	31410	Le Fauga
31182	31150	Fenouillet
31183	31260	Figarol
31184	31130	Flourens
31185	31290	Folcarde
31186	31140	Fonbeauzard
31187	31470	Fonsorbes
31188	31470	Fontenilles
31189	31370	Forgues
31190	31440	Fos
31191	31160	Fougaron
31192	31450	Fourquevaux
31193	31430	Le Fousseret
31194	31460	Francarville
31195	31260	Francazal
31196	31420	Francon
31197	31210	Franquevielle
31198	31360	Le Fréchet
31199	31440	Fronsac
31200	31510	Frontignan-de-Comminges
31201	31230	Frontignan-Savès
31202	31620	Fronton
31203	31270	Frouzins
31204	31430	Fustignac
31205	31150	Gagnac-sur-Garonne
31206	31550	Gaillac-Toulza
31207	31510	Galié
31208	31160	Ganties
31209	31480	Garac
31210	31290	Gardouch
31211	31620	Gargas
31212	31380	Garidech
31213	31110	Garin
31215	31590	Gauré
31216	31380	Gémil
31217	31510	Génos
31218	31350	Gensac-de-Boulogne
31219	31310	Gensac-sur-Garonne
31220	31560	Gibel
31221	31110	Gouaux-de-Larboust
31222	31110	Gouaux-de-Luchon
31223	31230	Goudex
31224	31210	Gourdan-Polignan
31225	31310	Goutevernisse
31226	31310	Gouzens
31227	31120	Goyrans
31228	31380	Gragnague
31229	31430	Gratens
31230	31150	Gratentour
31231	31190	Grazac
31232	31330	Grenade
31233	31190	Grépiac
31234	31480	Le Grès
31235	31440	Guran
31236	31160	Herran
31237	31260	His
31238	31210	Huos
31239	31230	L'Isle-en-Dodon
31240	31450	Issus
31241	31160	Izaut-de-l'Hôtel
31242	31110	Jurvielle
31243	31540	Juzes
31244	31110	Juzet-de-Luchon
31245	31160	Juzet-d'Izaut
31246	31800	Labarthe-Inard
31247	31800	Labarthe-Rivière
31248	31860	Labarthe-sur-Lèze
31249	31450	Labastide-Beauvoir
31250	31370	Labastide-Clermont
31251	31230	Labastide-Paumès
31252	31620	Labastide-Saint-Sernin
31253	31600	Labastidette
31254	31670	Labège
31255	31510	Labroquère
31256	31190	Labruyère-Dorsa
31258	31390	Lacaugne
31259	31120	Lacroix-Falgarde
31260	31360	Laffite-Toupière
31261	31390	Lafitte-Vigordane
31262	31290	Lagarde
31263	31870	Lagardelle-sur-Lèze
31264	31190	Lagrâce-Dieu
31265	31480	Lagraulet-Saint-Nicolas
31266	31370	Lahage
31267	31310	Lahitère
31268	31800	Lalouret-Laffiteau
31269	31600	Lamasquère
31270	31800	Landorthe
31271	31570	Lanta
31272	31310	Lapeyrère
31273	31180	Lapeyrouse-Fossat
31274	31800	Larcan
31275	31480	Laréole
31592	31330	Larra
31276	31580	Larroque
31277	31530	Lasserre-Pradère
31278	31800	Latoue
31279	31310	Latour
31280	31310	Latrape
31281	31330	Launac
31282	31140	Launaguet
31283	31370	Lautignac
31284	31650	Lauzerville
31285	31590	Lavalette
31286	31220	Lavelanet-de-Comminges
31287	31410	Lavernose-Lacasse
31288	31340	Layrac-sur-Tarn
31289	31580	Lécussan
31290	31440	Lège
31291	31490	Léguevin
31292	31220	Lescuns
31293	31150	Lespinasse
31294	31160	Lespiteau
31295	31350	Lespugue
31296	31360	Lestelle-de-Saint-Martory
31297	31530	Lévignac
31299	31600	Lherm
31300	31800	Lieoux
31301	31230	Lilhac
31302	31800	Lodes
31303	31410	Longages
31304	31460	Loubens-Lauragais
31305	31580	Loudet
31306	31510	Lourde
31308	31510	Luscan
31309	31430	Lussan-Adeilhac
31310	31290	Lux
31311	31340	La Magdelaine-sur-Tarn
31312	31310	Mailholas
31313	31510	Malvezie
31314	31360	Mancioux
31315	31260	Mane
31316	31440	Marignac
31317	31430	Marignac-Lasclares
31318	31220	Marignac-Laspeyres
31319	31550	Marliac
31320	31390	Marquefave
31321	31260	Marsoulas
31322	31230	Martisserre
31323	31210	Martres-de-Rivière
31324	31220	Martres-Tolosane
31325	31460	Mascarville
31326	31310	Massabrac
31327	31220	Mauran
31328	31290	Mauremont
31329	31540	Maurens
31330	31190	Mauressac
31331	31460	Maureville
31332	31190	Mauvaisin
31333	31230	Mauvezin
31334	31410	Mauzac
31335	31110	Mayrègne
31336	31260	Mazères-sur-Salat
31337	31440	Melles
31338	31530	Menville
31339	31530	Mérenvielle
31340	31320	Mervilla
31341	31330	Merville
31342	31160	Milhas
31343	31230	Mirambeau
31344	31800	Miramont-de-Comminges
31345	31190	Miremont
31346	31340	Mirepoix-sur-Tarn
31347	31230	Molas
31348	31160	Moncaup
31349	31220	Mondavezan
31350	31350	Mondilhan
31351	31700	Mondonville
31352	31850	Mondouzil
31353	31370	Monès
31354	31560	Monestrol
31355	31280	Mons
31356	31530	Montaigut-sur-Save
31357	31160	Montastruc-de-Salies
31358	31380	Montastruc-la-Conseillère
31359	31370	Montastruc-Savès
31360	31110	Montauban-de-Luchon
31361	31410	Montaut
31362	31220	Montberaud
31363	31230	Montbernard
31364	31140	Montberon
31365	31310	Montbrun-Bocage
31366	31450	Montbrun-Lauragais
31367	31220	Montclar-de-Comminges
31368	31290	Montclar-Lauragais
31369	31510	Mont-de-Galié
31370	31430	Montégut-Bourjac
31371	31540	Montégut-Lauragais
31372	31260	Montespan
31373	31230	Montesquieu-Guittaut
31374	31450	Montesquieu-Lauragais
31375	31310	Montesquieu-Volvestre
31376	31260	Montgaillard-de-Salies
31377	31290	Montgaillard-Lauragais
31378	31350	Montgaillard-sur-Save
31379	31410	Montgazin
31380	31560	Montgeard
31381	31450	Montgiscard
31382	31370	Montgras
31383	31380	Montjoire
31384	31450	Montlaur
31385	31350	Montmaurin
31386	31420	Montoulieu-Saint-Bernard
31387	31430	Montoussin
31388	31380	Montpitol
31389	31850	Montrabé
31390	31210	Montréjeau
31391	31260	Montsaunès
31392	31460	Mourvilles-Basses
31393	31540	Mourvilles-Hautes
31394	31110	Moustajon
31395	31600	Muret
31396	31560	Nailloux
31397	31350	Nénigan
31398	31350	Nizan-Gesse
31399	31410	Noé
31400	31540	Nogaret
31401	31450	Noueilles
31402	31450	Odars
31403	31330	Ondes
31404	31110	Oô
31405	31510	Ore
31406	31220	Palaminy
31407	31380	Paulhac
31408	31510	Payssous
31409	31320	Péchabou
31410	31140	Pechbonnieu
31411	31320	Pechbusque
31412	31350	Péguilhan
31413	31480	Pelleport
31414	31420	Peyrissas
31415	31420	Peyrouzet
31416	31390	Peyssies
31417	31820	Pibrac
31418	31130	Pin-Balma
31419	31370	Le Pin-Murelet
31420	31120	Pinsaguel
31421	31860	Pins-Justaret
31422	31220	Plagne
31423	31370	Plagnole
31424	31830	Plaisance-du-Touch
31425	31220	Le Plan
31426	31210	Pointis-de-Rivière
31427	31800	Pointis-Inard
31428	31430	Polastron
31429	31450	Pompertuzat
31430	31210	Ponlat-Taillebourg
31431	31160	Portet-d'Aspet
31432	31110	Portet-de-Luchon
31433	31120	Portet-sur-Garonne
31434	31110	Poubeau
31435	31370	Poucharramet
31436	31430	Pouy-de-Touges
31437	31450	Pouze
31439	31570	Préserville
31440	31360	Proupiary
31441	31460	Prunet
31442	31190	Puydaniel
31443	31230	Puymaurin
31444	31480	Puysségur
31445	31130	Quint-Fonsegrives
31446	31520	Ramonville-Saint-Agne
31447	31160	Razecueillé
31448	31320	Rebigue
31449	31800	Régades
31450	31290	Renneville
31451	31250	Revel
31452	31800	Rieucazé
31453	31290	Rieumajou
31454	31370	Rieumes
31455	31310	Rieux-Volvestre
31456	31230	Riolas
31457	31360	Roquefort-sur-Garonne
31458	31120	Roques-sur-Garonne
31459	31380	Roquesérière
31460	31120	Roquettes
31461	31160	Rouède
31462	31180	Rouffiac-Tolosan
31463	31540	Roumens
31464	31370	Sabonnères
31465	31110	Saccourvielle
31466	31470	Saiguède
31467	31140	Saint-Alban
31468	31420	Saint-André
31469	31430	Saint-Araille
31470	31110	Saint-Aventin
31471	31440	Saint-Béat-Lez
31472	31510	Saint-Bertrand-de-Comminges
31473	31330	Saint-Cézert
31474	31310	Saint-Christaud
31475	31600	Saint-Clar-de-Rivière
31480	31570	Sainte-Foy-d'Aigrefeuille
31481	31470	Sainte-Foy-de-Peyrolières
31496	31530	Sainte-Livrade
31476	31430	Saint-Élix-le-Château
31477	31420	Saint-Élix-Séglan
31478	31540	Saint-Félix-Lauragais
31479	31350	Saint-Ferréol-de-Comminges
31482	31230	Saint-Frajou
31483	31800	Saint-Gaudens
31484	31180	Saint-Geniès-Bellevue
31485	31290	Saint-Germier
31486	31410	Saint-Hilaire
31487	31800	Saint-Ignan
31488	31240	Saint-Jean
31489	31380	Saint-Jean-Lherm
31490	31790	Saint-Jory
31491	31540	Saint-Julia
31492	31220	Saint-Julien-sur-Garonne
31493	31350	Saint-Lary-Boujean
31494	31230	Saint-Laurent
31495	31560	Saint-Léon
31497	31140	Saint-Loup-Cammas
31498	31350	Saint-Loup-en-Comminges
31499	31470	Saint-Lys
31500	31110	Saint-Mamet
31501	31590	Saint-Marcel-Paulel
31502	31800	Saint-Marcet
31503	31360	Saint-Martory
31504	31360	Saint-Médard
31505	31220	Saint-Michel
31506	31650	Saint-Orens-de-Gameville
31508	31110	Saint-Paul-d'Oueil
31507	31530	Saint-Paul-sur-Save
31509	31510	Saint-Pé-d'Ardet
31510	31350	Saint-Pé-Delbosc
31511	31590	Saint-Pierre
31512	31570	Saint-Pierre-de-Lages
31513	31580	Saint-Plancard
31514	31290	Saint-Rome
31515	31620	Saint-Rustice
31516	31790	Saint-Sauveur
31517	31410	Saint-Sulpice-sur-Lèze
31518	31470	Saint-Thomas
31519	31290	Saint-Vincent
31520	31370	Sajas
31521	31260	Saleich
31522	31230	Salerm
31523	31260	Salies-du-Salat
31524	31110	Salles-et-Pratviel
31525	31390	Salles-sur-Garonne
31527	31460	La Salvetat-Lauragais
31526	31880	La Salvetat-Saint-Gilles
31528	31350	Saman
31529	31420	Samouillan
31530	31220	Sana
31531	31350	Sarrecave
31532	31350	Sarremezan
31533	31600	Saubens
31534	31460	Saussens
31535	31510	Sauveterre-de-Comminges
31536	31800	Saux-et-Pomarède
31537	31800	Savarthès
31538	31370	Savères
31539	31580	Sédeilhac
31540	31460	Ségreville
31541	31840	Seilh
31542	31510	Seilhan
31543	31430	Sénarens
31544	31160	Sengouagnet
31545	31360	Sepx
31546	31560	Seyre
31547	31600	Seysses
31548	31440	Signac
31549	31110	Sode
31550	31160	Soueich
31551	31570	Tarabel
31552	31420	Terrebasse
31553	31530	Thil
31554	31260	Touille
31555	31000	Toulouse
31557	31170	Tournefeuille
31556	31210	Les Tourreilles
31558	31460	Toutens
31559	31110	Trébons-de-Luchon
31560	31290	Trébons-sur-la-Grasse
31561	31240	L'Union
31562	31260	Urau
31563	31340	Vacquiers
31564	31510	Valcabrère
31565	31800	Valentine
31566	31290	Vallègue
31567	31570	Vallesvilles
31568	31450	Varennes
31569	31250	Vaudreuille
31570	31540	Vaux
31571	31460	Vendine
31572	31810	Venerque
31573	31590	Verfeil
31574	31810	Vernet
31575	31320	Vieille-Toulouse
31576	31290	Vieillevigne
31577	31480	Vignaux
31578	31320	Vigoulet-Auzil
31579	31380	Villariès
31580	31860	Villate
31581	31620	Villaudric
31582	31290	Villefranche-de-Lauragais
31583	31340	Villematier
31584	31340	Villemur-sur-Tarn
31585	31800	Villeneuve-de-Rivière
31586	31580	Villeneuve-Lécussan
31587	31620	Villeneuve-lès-Bouloc
31588	31270	Villeneuve-Tolosane
31589	31290	Villenouvelle
