= Bax, Haute-Garonne =

Bax
- Commune
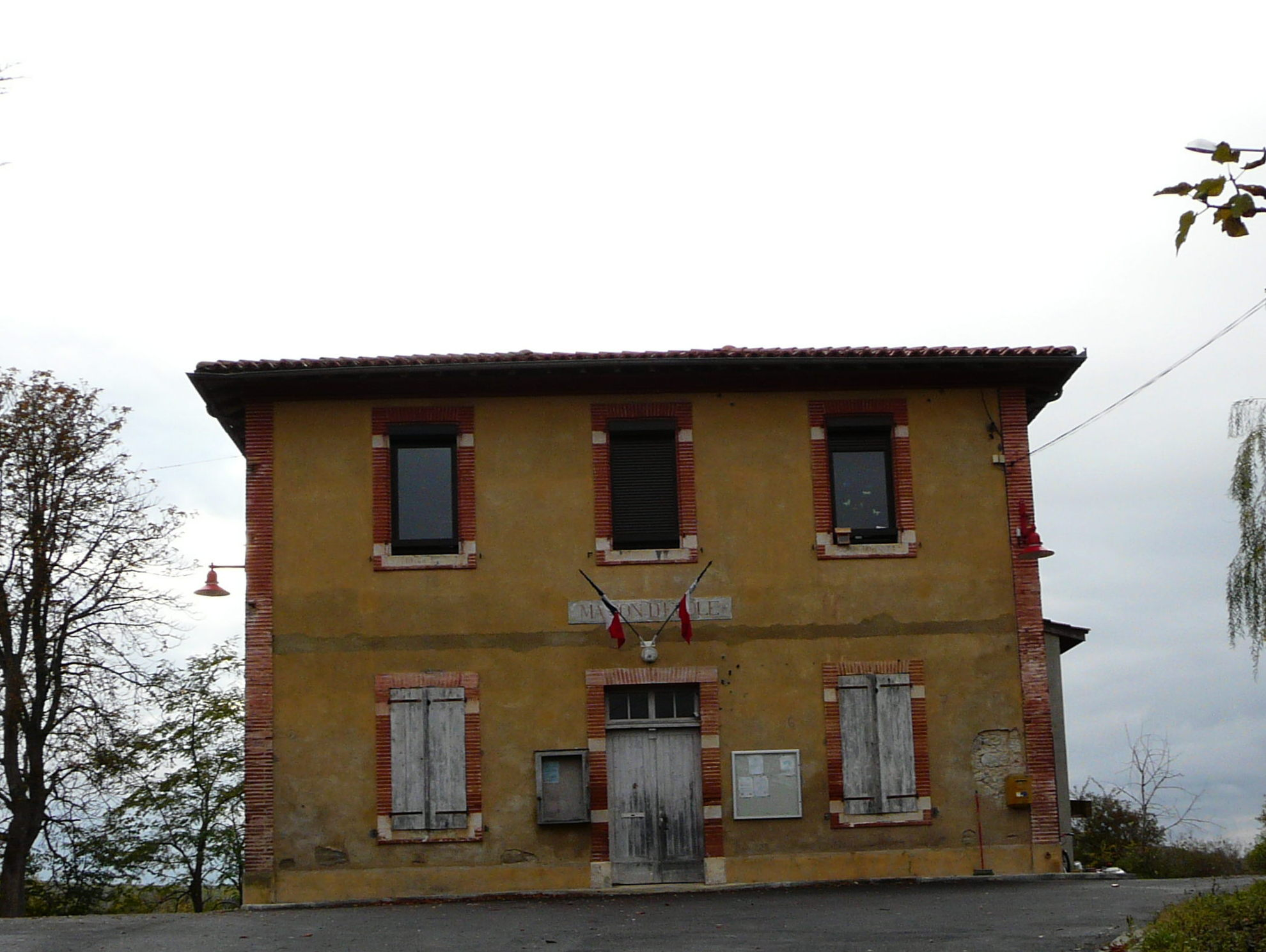
- Town hall

- Coat of arms
- Location of Bax
- Location within France Location within Occitanie
- Coordinates: 43°13′38″N 1°17′21″E
- Country: France
- Region: Occitania
- Department: Haute-Garonne
- Arrondissement: Muret
- Canton: Auterive
- Intercommunality: Volvestre

Government
  - Mayor (2020–2026): Jean-Marc Manfrin
- Area^{1}: 5.99 km^{2} (2.31 sq mi)
- Elevation: 250 m (820 ft)
- Highest elevation: 371 m (1,217 ft)
- Lowest elevation: 243 m (797 ft)
- Population (2023): 101
  - Density: 16.9/km^{2} (43.7/sq mi)
- Time zone: UTC+01:00 (CET)
  - Summer (DST): UTC+02:00 (CEST)
- INSEE/Postal code: 31047 /31310
- ^{1} French Land Register data, which excludes lakes, ponds, glaciers > 1 km^{2} (0.386 sq mi or 247 acres) and river estuaries.

Bax is a small rural village and commune in the Haute-Garonne department in southwestern France.

== Geography ==
The commune is bordered by six other communes: Latrape to the north, Canens to the east, Lapeyrère to the southeast, Latour to the south, Montesquieu-Volvestre to the west, and finally by Mailholas to the northwest.

== Population ==
Historical population
Year	Pop.	±% p.a.
1968	70	—
1975	80	+1.93%
1982	50	−6.49%
1990	65	+3.33%
1999	81	+2.48%
2007	87	+0.90%
2012	86	−0.23%
2017	89	+0.69%
2023	101	+2.13%
Source: INSEE

Its inhabitants are called Baxéens in French.

== See also ==
- Communes of the Haute-Garonne department
