= Carbonne =

Carbonne Carbona (Occitan)
- Commune
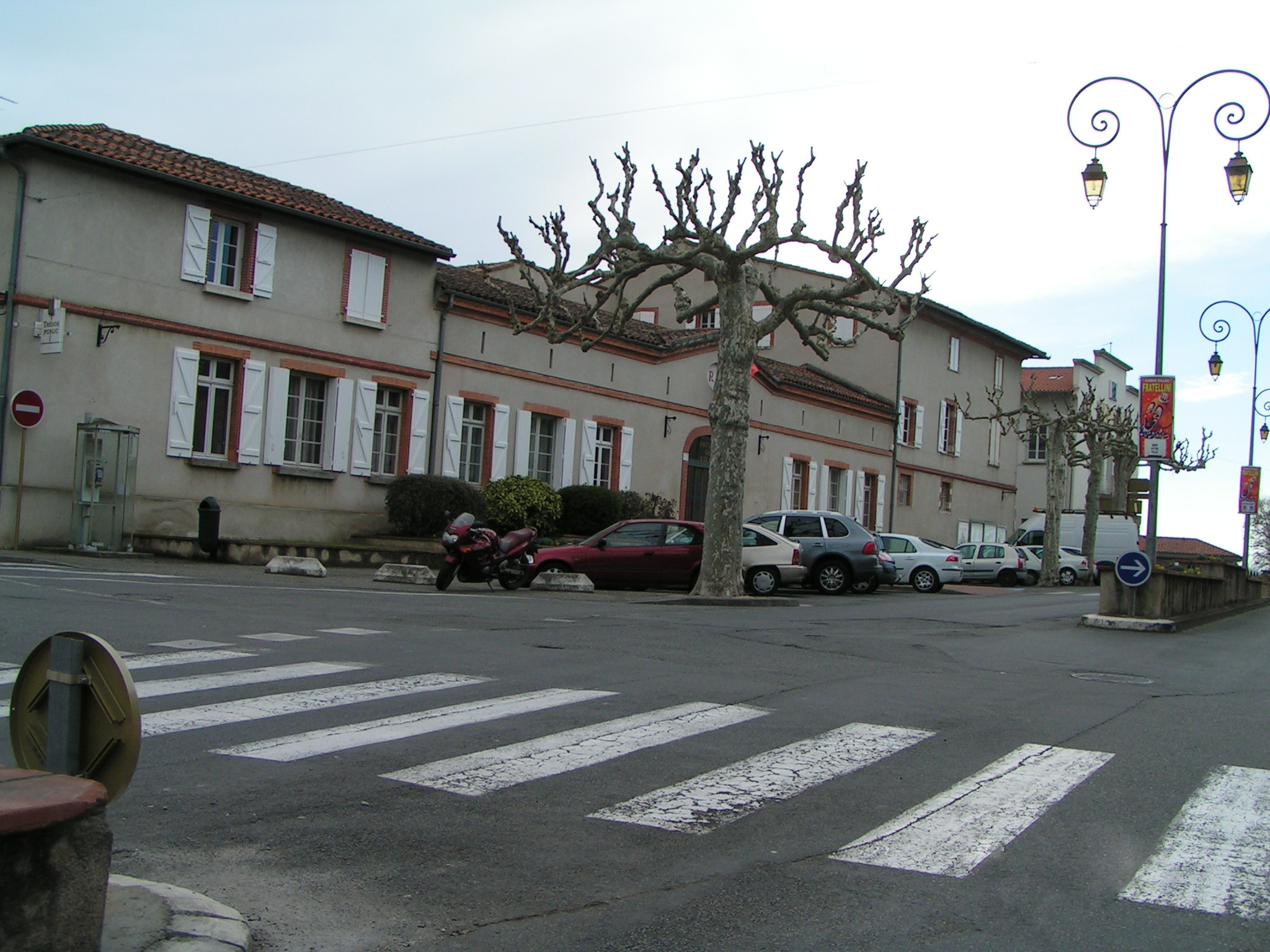
- Town hall

- Coat of arms
- Location of Carbonne
- Location within France Location within Occitanie
- Coordinates: 43°17′54″N 1°11′12″E
- Country: France
- Region: Occitania
- Department: Haute-Garonne
- Arrondissement: Muret
- Canton: Auterive
- Intercommunality: Volvestre

Government
  - Mayor (2020–2026): Denis Turrel
- Area^{1}: 26.59 km^{2} (10.27 sq mi)
- Elevation: 206 m (676 ft)
- Highest elevation: 332 m (1,089 ft)
- Lowest elevation: 183 m (600 ft)
- Population (2023): 5,563
  - Density: 209.2/km^{2} (541.9/sq mi)
- Time zone: UTC+01:00 (CET)
  - Summer (DST): UTC+02:00 (CEST)
- INSEE/Postal code: 31107 /31390
- ^{1} French Land Register data, which excludes lakes, ponds, glaciers > 1 km^{2} (0.386 sq mi or 247 acres) and river estuaries.

Carbonne (French pronunciation: [kaʁbɔn]; Occitan: Carbona) is a commune in the Haute-Garonne department in southwestern France.

== Geography ==
The A64 autoroute passes near the village. Carbonne station on the Toulouse–Bayonne railway has rail connections to Toulouse, Pau and Tarbes.

It is situated at the confluence of the river Arize and the Garonne. There is a hydro-electrical dam located at the Garonne.

The commune is bordered by nine other communes: Longages to the north, Capens to the northeast, Marquefave to the east, Lacaugne and Latrape to the southeast, Rieux-Volvestre to the south, Salles-sur-Garonne to the southwest, Lafitte-Vigordane to the west, and finally by Peyssies to the northwest.

== Population ==
Historical population

Year	Pop.	±% p.a.
1793	1,643	—
1800	964	−7.33%
1806	1,835	+11.33%
1821	1,863	+0.10%
1831	1,981	+0.62%
1836	2,235	+2.44%
1841	2,293	+0.51%
1846	2,468	+1.48%
1851	2,462	−0.05%
1856	2,444	−0.15%
1861	2,468	+0.20%
1866	2,484	+0.13%
1872	2,505	+0.14%
1876	2,577	+0.71%
1881	2,520	−0.45%
1886	2,548	+0.22%
1891	2,456	−0.73%
1896	2,303	−1.28%
1901	2,387	+0.72%

Year	Pop.	±% p.a.
1906	2,359	−0.24%
1911	2,393	+0.29%
1921	2,154	−1.05%
1926	2,350	+1.76%
1931	2,250	−0.87%
1936	2,277	+0.24%
1946	2,323	+0.20%
1954	2,473	+0.79%
1962	2,625	+0.75%
1968	3,222	+3.47%
1975	3,218	−0.02%
1982	3,596	+1.60%
1990	3,795	+0.68%
1999	3,692	−0.31%
2007	4,777	+3.27%
2012	5,164	+1.57%
2017	5,712	+2.04%
2023	5,563	−0.44%

Source: EHESS and INSEE (1968-2023)

== Economy ==
Agriculture based on the culture of cereals (maize, wheat, ...) still has an important place but has tended to diminish in favour of residential zones, due to the proximity of the agglomeration of Toulouse.

== International relations ==
Carbonne is twinned with:

- Galliera Veneta (Italy)
- (United Kingdom) Monmouth (Wales)
- Korschenbroich (Germany) since 1988
- Fuente Obejuna (Spain)

== See also ==
- Communes of the Haute-Garonne department
- André Abbal
