= Canens, Haute-Garonne =

Canens
- Commune
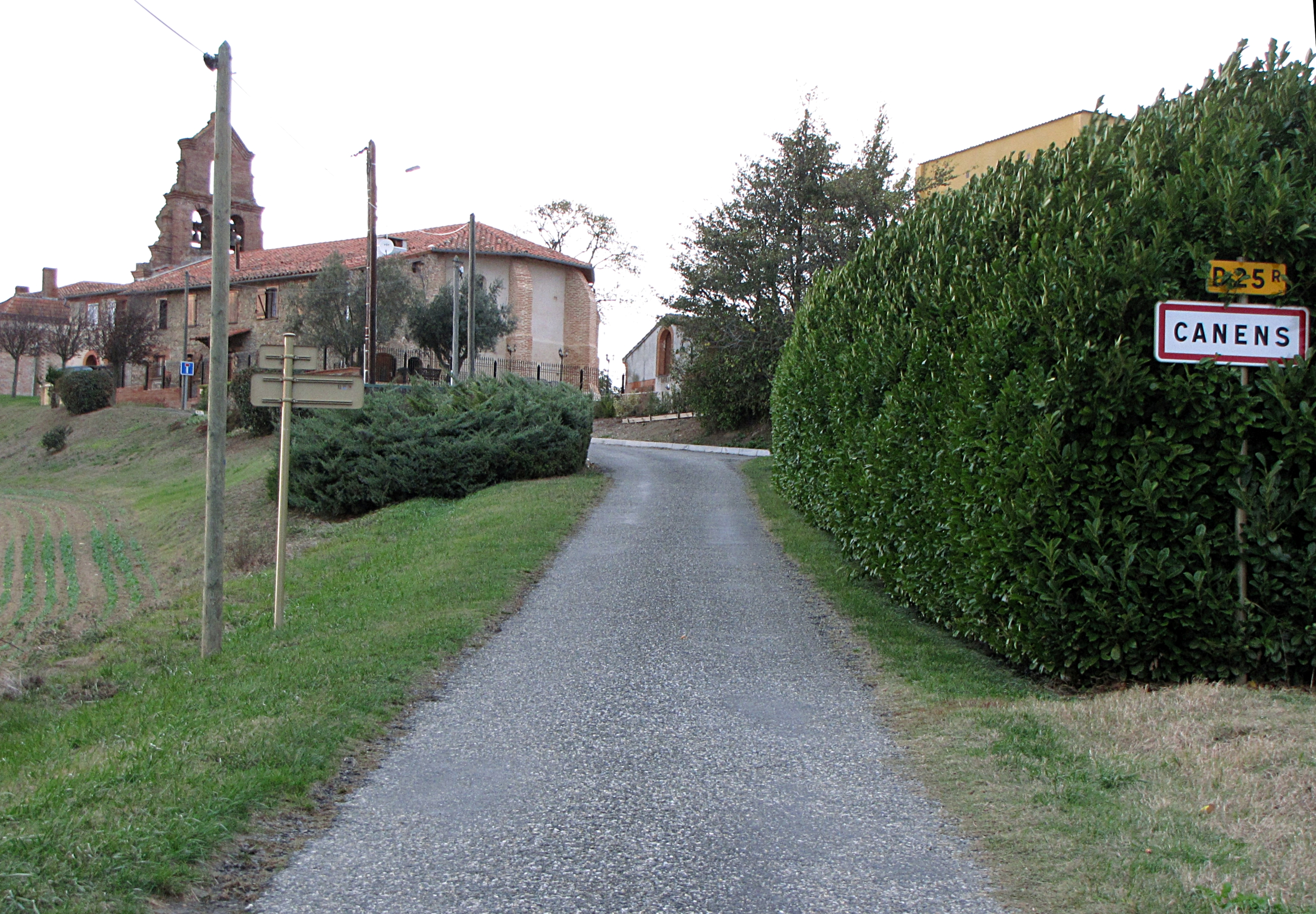
- The road into Canens
- Location of Canens
- Location within France Location within Occitanie
- Coordinates: 43°12′59″N 1°19′55″E
- Country: France
- Region: Occitania
- Department: Haute-Garonne
- Arrondissement: Muret
- Canton: Auterive
- Intercommunality: Volvestre

Government
  - Mayor (2020–2026): Julien Baudiniere
- Area^{1}: 4.84 km^{2} (1.87 sq mi)
- Elevation: 430 m (1,410 ft)
- Highest elevation: 361 m (1,184 ft)
- Lowest elevation: 240 m (790 ft)
- Population (2023): 63
  - Density: 13/km^{2} (34/sq mi)
- Time zone: UTC+01:00 (CET)
  - Summer (DST): UTC+02:00 (CEST)
- INSEE/Postal code: 31103 /31310
- ^{1} French Land Register data, which excludes lakes, ponds, glaciers > 1 km^{2} (0.386 sq mi or 247 acres) and river estuaries.

Canens is a commune in the Haute-Garonne department in southwestern France.

== Geography ==
The commune is bordered by five other communes, four of them is in Haute-Garonne, and one of them is in Ariège: Castagnac to the north, Bax to the west, Latrape to the northwest, Lapeyrère to the southwest, Massabrac to the east, and finally by the department of Ariège to the south by the commune of Sainte-Suzanne to the south.

== Population ==
Historical population
Year	Pop.	±% p.a.
1968	65	—
1975	43	−5.73%
1982	43	+0.00%
1990	48	+1.38%
1999	69	+4.11%
2007	61	−1.53%
2012	54	−2.41%
2017	60	+2.13%
2023	63	+0.82%
Source: INSEE

== See also ==
- Communes of the Haute-Garonne department
