= Mailholas =

- Commune
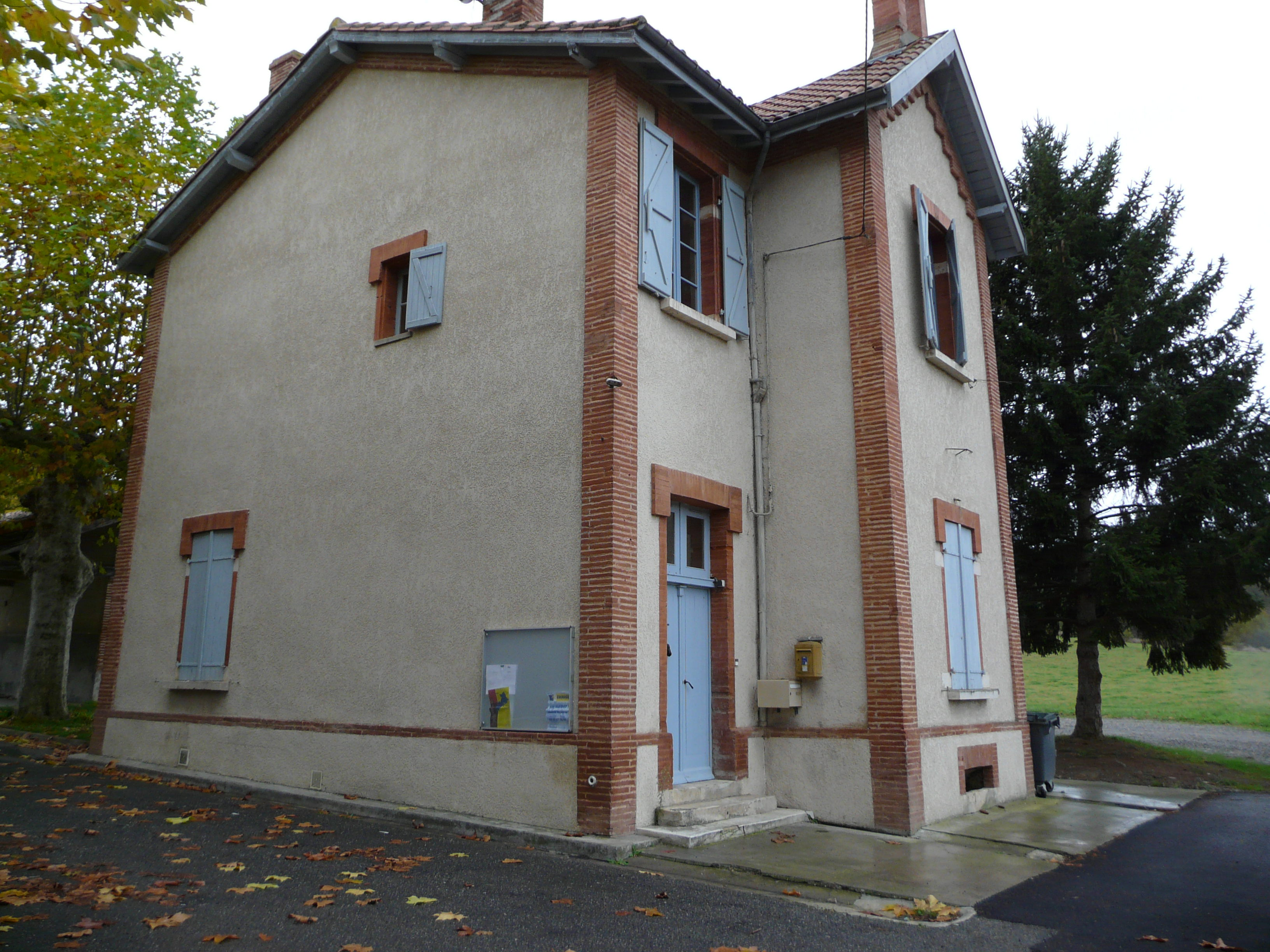
- Town hall

- Coat of arms
- Location of Mailholas
- Location within France Location within Occitanie
- Coordinates: 43°14′55″N 1°15′06″E
- Country: France
- Region: Occitania
- Department: Haute-Garonne
- Arrondissement: Muret
- Canton: Auterive
- Intercommunality: Volvestre

Government
  - Mayor (2020–2026): Jean-Michel Cazaux
- Area^{1}: 2.94 km^{2} (1.14 sq mi)
- Elevation: 333 m (1,093 ft)
- Highest elevation: 342 m (1,122 ft)
- Lowest elevation: 230 m (750 ft)
- Population (2023): 34
  - Density: 12/km^{2} (30/sq mi)
- Time zone: UTC+01:00 (CET)
  - Summer (DST): UTC+02:00 (CEST)
- INSEE/Postal code: 31312 /31310
- ^{1} French Land Register data, which excludes lakes, ponds, glaciers > 1 km^{2} (0.386 sq mi or 247 acres) and river estuaries.

Mailholas is a commune in the Haute-Garonne department in southwestern France.

== Geography ==
The commune is bordered by four other communes: Rieux-Volvestre to the northwest, Montesquieu-Volvestre to the south, Bax to the southeast, and finally by Latrape to the east.

== Population ==
Historical population
Year	Pop.	±% p.a.
1968	51	—
1975	37	−4.48%
1982	39	+0.75%
1990	28	−4.06%
1999	38	+3.45%
2007	40	+0.64%
2012	39	−0.51%
2017	34	−2.71%
2023	34	+0.00%
Source: INSEE

== See also ==
- Communes of the Haute-Garonne department
