= Beaumont-sur-Lèze =

- Commune
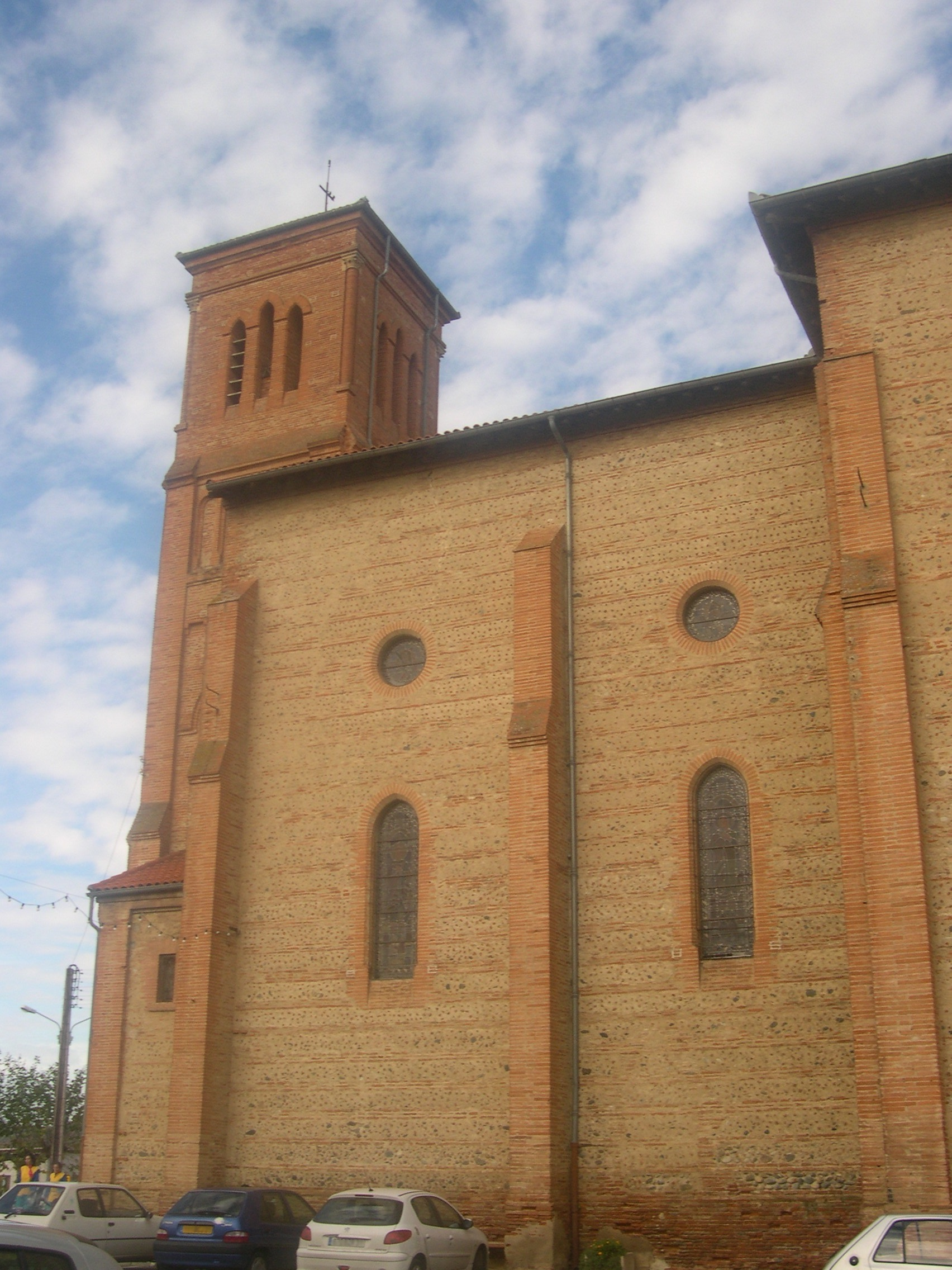
- The church in Beaumont-sur-Lèze

- Coat of arms
- Location of Beaumont-sur-Lèze
- Location within France Location within Occitanie
- Coordinates: 43°22′54″N 1°21′30″E
- Country: France
- Region: Occitania
- Department: Haute-Garonne
- Arrondissement: Muret
- Canton: Auterive

Government
  - Mayor (2020–2026): Olivier Carté
- Area^{1}: 26.31 km^{2} (10.16 sq mi)
- Elevation: 148 m (486 ft)
- Highest elevation: 311 m (1,020 ft)
- Lowest elevation: 174 m (571 ft)
- Population (2023): 1,647
  - Density: 62.60/km^{2} (162.1/sq mi)
- Time zone: UTC+01:00 (CET)
  - Summer (DST): UTC+02:00 (CEST)
- INSEE/Postal code: 31052 /31870
- ^{1} French Land Register data, which excludes lakes, ponds, glaciers > 1 km^{2} (0.386 sq mi or 247 acres) and river estuaries.

Beaumont-sur-Lèze (French pronunciation: [bomɔ̃ syʁ lɛz], literally Beaumont on Lèze; Occitan: Bèumont de Lesat) is a commune in the Haute-Garonne department in southwestern France.

== Geography ==
The Lèze forms part of the commune's southwestern border, flows northeastward through the middle of the commune and crosses the village. The border between Beaumont-sur-Lèze and Montaut is formed both land and river borders. The commune is very near to the capital of the arrondissement of Muret, Muret.

The commune is bordered by eight other communes: Eaunes to the north, Lagardelle-sur-Lèze to the northeast, Muret to the northwest, Le Fauga to the west, Mauzac to the southwest, Montaut across by the river Lèze and the land border to the south, and finally by Auribail to the southeast.

== Population ==
Historical population
Year	Pop.	±% p.a.
1968	833	—
1975	907	+1.22%
1982	1,105	+2.86%
1990	1,239	+1.44%
1999	1,414	+1.48%
2007	1,477	+0.55%
2012	1,527	+0.67%
2017	1,557	+0.39%
2023	1,647	+0.94%
Source: INSEE

== See also ==
- Communes of the Haute-Garonne department
