= Canton of Auterive =

Coordinates: 43.35°N 1.48°E

The canton of Auterive is an administrative division of the Haute-Garonne department, southern France. Its borders were modified at the French canton reorganisation which came into effect in March 2015. Its seat is in Auterive.

It consists of the following communes:

1. Auribail
2. Auterive
3. Bax
4. Beaumont-sur-Lèze
5. Bois-de-la-Pierre
6. Canens
7. Capens
8. Carbonne
9. Castagnac
10. Caujac
11. Cintegabelle
12. Esperce
13. Gaillac-Toulza
14. Gensac-sur-Garonne
15. Goutevernisse
16. Gouzens
17. Grazac
18. Grépiac
19. Labruyère-Dorsa
20. Lacaugne
21. Lafitte-Vigordane
22. Lagrâce-Dieu
23. Lahitère
24. Lapeyrère
25. Latour
26. Latrape
27. Lavelanet-de-Comminges
28. Longages
29. Mailholas
30. Marliac
31. Marquefave
32. Massabrac
33. Mauressac
34. Mauzac
35. Miremont
36. Montaut
37. Montbrun-Bocage
38. Montesquieu-Volvestre
39. Montgazin
40. Noé
41. Peyssies
42. Puydaniel
43. Rieux-Volvestre
44. Saint-Christaud
45. Saint-Julien-sur-Garonne
46. Saint-Sulpice-sur-Lèze
47. Salles-sur-Garonne
