= Saint-Sulpice-sur-Lèze =

- Commune
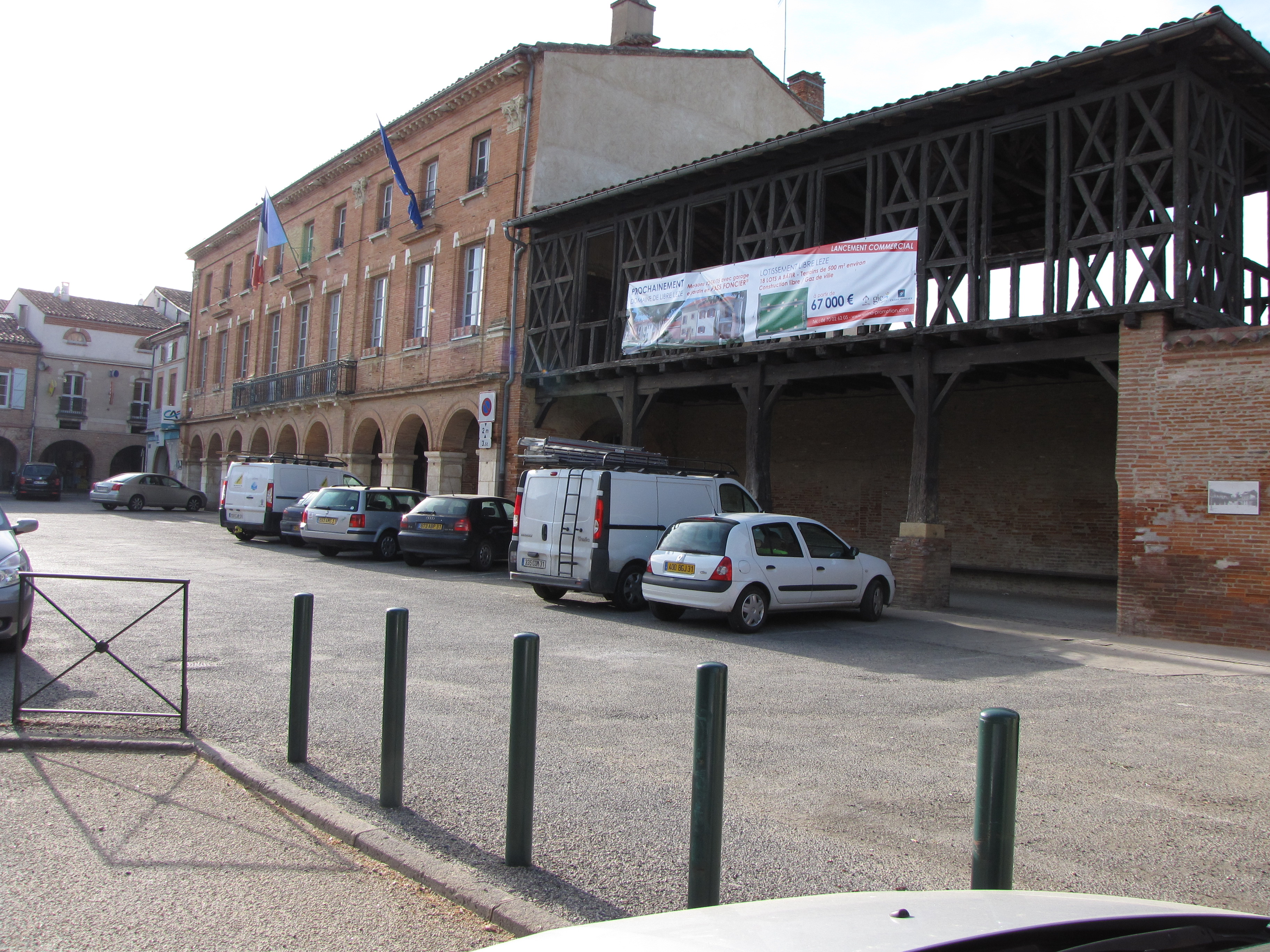
- Town hall

- Coat of arms
- Location of Saint-Sulpice-sur-Lèze
- Location within France Location within Occitanie
- Coordinates: 43°19′47″N 1°19′21″E
- Country: France
- Region: Occitania
- Department: Haute-Garonne
- Arrondissement: Muret
- Canton: Auterive
- Intercommunality: Volvestre

Government
  - Mayor (2020–2026): Sylvette Condis
- Area^{1}: 13.91 km^{2} (5.37 sq mi)
- Elevation: 199 m (653 ft)
- Highest elevation: 321 m (1,053 ft)
- Lowest elevation: 190 m (620 ft)
- Population (2023): 2,277
  - Density: 163.7/km^{2} (424.0/sq mi)
- Time zone: UTC+01:00 (CET)
  - Summer (DST): UTC+02:00 (CEST)
- INSEE/Postal code: 31517 /31410
- ^{1} French Land Register data, which excludes lakes, ponds, glaciers > 1 km^{2} (0.386 sq mi or 247 acres) and river estuaries.

Saint-Sulpice-sur-Lèze (French pronunciation: [sɛ̃ sylpis syʁ lɛz], literally Saint-Sulpice on Lèze; Languedocien: Sent Somplesi) is a commune in the Haute-Garonne department in southwestern France.

== Geography ==
The Lèze forms part of the commune's southwestern border, flows north through the western part of the commune, crosses the village and forms part of its northwestern border.

== Population ==
Historical population
Year	Pop.	±% p.a.
1968	1,010	—
1975	1,192	+2.40%
1982	1,264	+0.84%
1990	1,423	+1.49%
1999	1,639	+1.58%
2007	1,809	+1.24%
2012	1,900	+0.99%
2017	2,389	+4.69%
2023	2,277	−0.80%
Source: INSEE

== See also ==
- Communes of the Haute-Garonne department
