= Montgazin =

- Commune
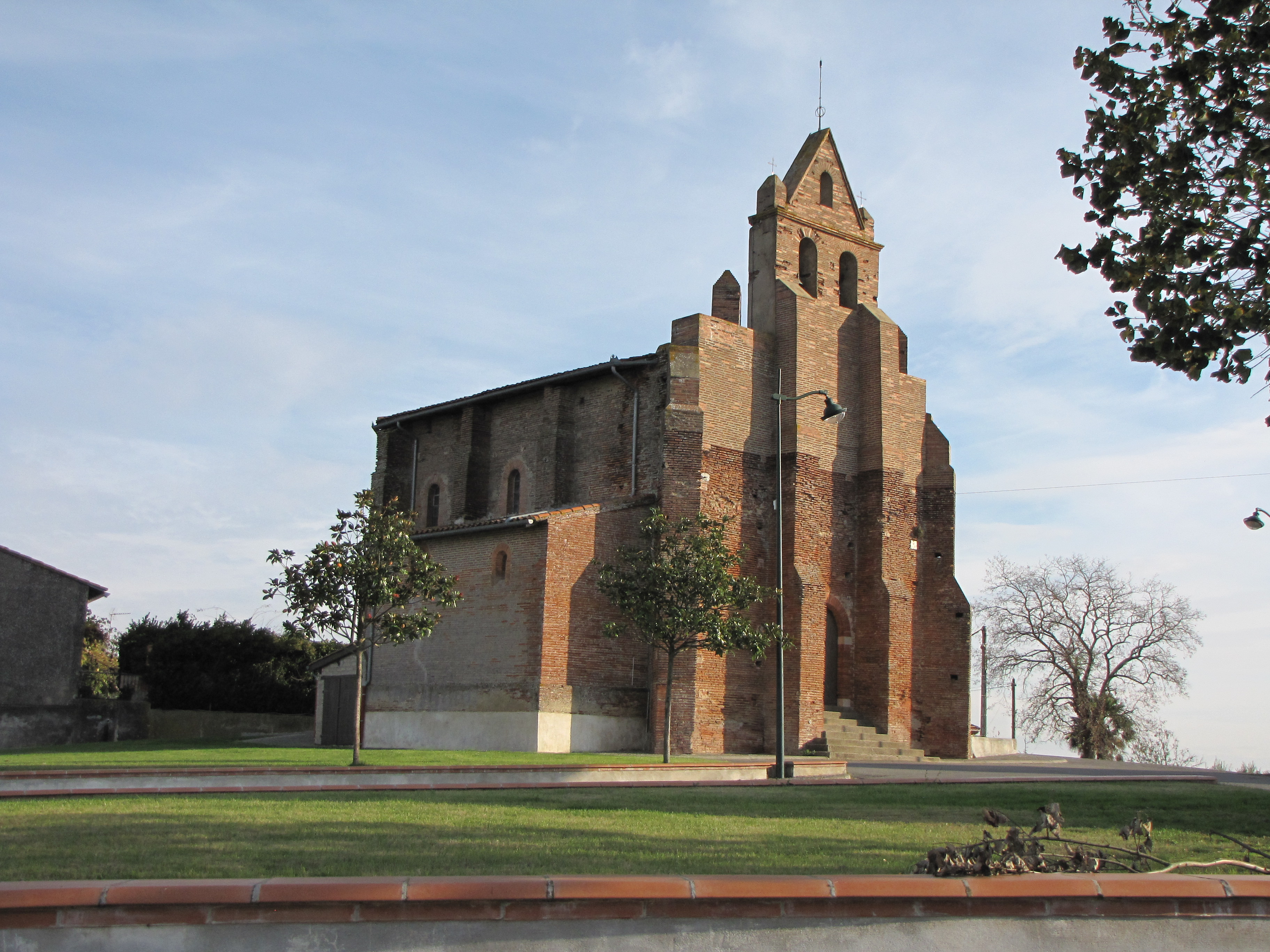
- The church in Montgazin

- Coat of arms
- Location of Montgazin
- Location within France Location within Occitanie
- Coordinates: 43°18′37″N 1°18′18″E
- Country: France
- Region: Occitania
- Department: Haute-Garonne
- Arrondissement: Muret
- Canton: Auterive
- Intercommunality: Volvestre

Government
  - Mayor (2020–2026): Chantal Gilama
- Area^{1}: 6.89 km^{2} (2.66 sq mi)
- Elevation: 280 m (920 ft)
- Highest elevation: 292 m (958 ft)
- Lowest elevation: 205 m (673 ft)
- Population (2023): 164
  - Density: 23.8/km^{2} (61.6/sq mi)
- Time zone: UTC+01:00 (CET)
  - Summer (DST): UTC+02:00 (CEST)
- INSEE/Postal code: 31379 /31410
- ^{1} French Land Register data, which excludes lakes, ponds, glaciers > 1 km^{2} (0.386 sq mi or 247 acres) and river estuaries.

Montgazin (French pronunciation: [mɔ̃ɡazɛ̃]; Occitan: Montgasin) is a commune in the Haute-Garonne department of southwestern France.

== Population ==
Historical population
Year	Pop.	±% p.a.
1968	162	—
1975	133	−2.78%
1982	122	−1.23%
1990	125	+0.30%
1999	151	+2.12%
2007	173	+1.71%
2012	165	−0.94%
2017	197	+3.61%
2023	164	−3.01%
Source: INSEE

== See also ==
- Communes of the Haute-Garonne department
