= Noé, Haute-Garonne =

Noé
- Commune
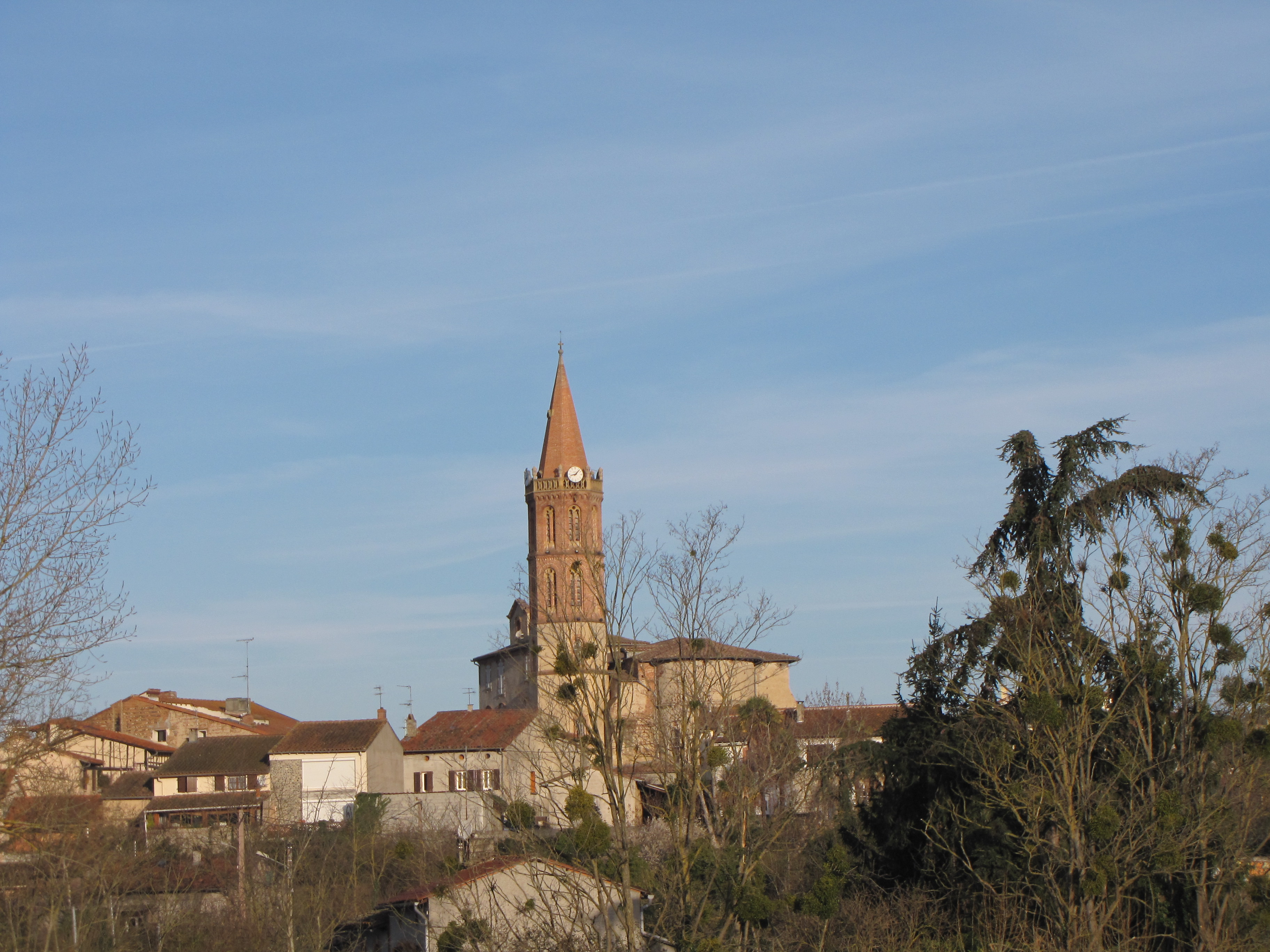
- The church in Noé

- Coat of arms
- Location of Noé
- Location within France Location within Occitanie
- Coordinates: 43°21′17″N 1°16′32″E
- Country: France
- Region: Occitania
- Department: Haute-Garonne
- Arrondissement: Muret
- Canton: Auterive

Government
  - Mayor (2020–2026): Max Cazarré
- Area^{1}: 9.65 km^{2} (3.73 sq mi)
- Elevation: 195 m (640 ft)
- Highest elevation: 280 m (920 ft)
- Lowest elevation: 175 m (574 ft)
- Population (2023): 3,067
  - Density: 318/km^{2} (823/sq mi)
- Time zone: UTC+01:00 (CET)
  - Summer (DST): UTC+02:00 (CEST)
- INSEE/Postal code: 31399 /31410
- ^{1} French Land Register data, which excludes lakes, ponds, glaciers > 1 km^{2} (0.386 sq mi or 247 acres) and river estuaries.

Noé (French pronunciation: [nɔe]; Occitan: Noèr) is a commune in the Haute-Garonne department, Southwestern France.

== Population ==
Historical population
Year	Pop.	±% p.a.
1968	1,034	—
1975	1,272	+3.00%
1982	1,543	+2.80%
1990	1,975	+3.13%
1999	2,066	+0.50%
2007	2,497	+2.40%
2012	2,739	+1.87%
2017	2,897	+1.13%
2023	3,067	+0.95%
Source: INSEE

== Transport ==
- Gare de Longages-Noé

== See also ==
- Communes of the Haute-Garonne department
