= Lézat-sur-Lèze =

Commune in Occitanie, France

- Commune
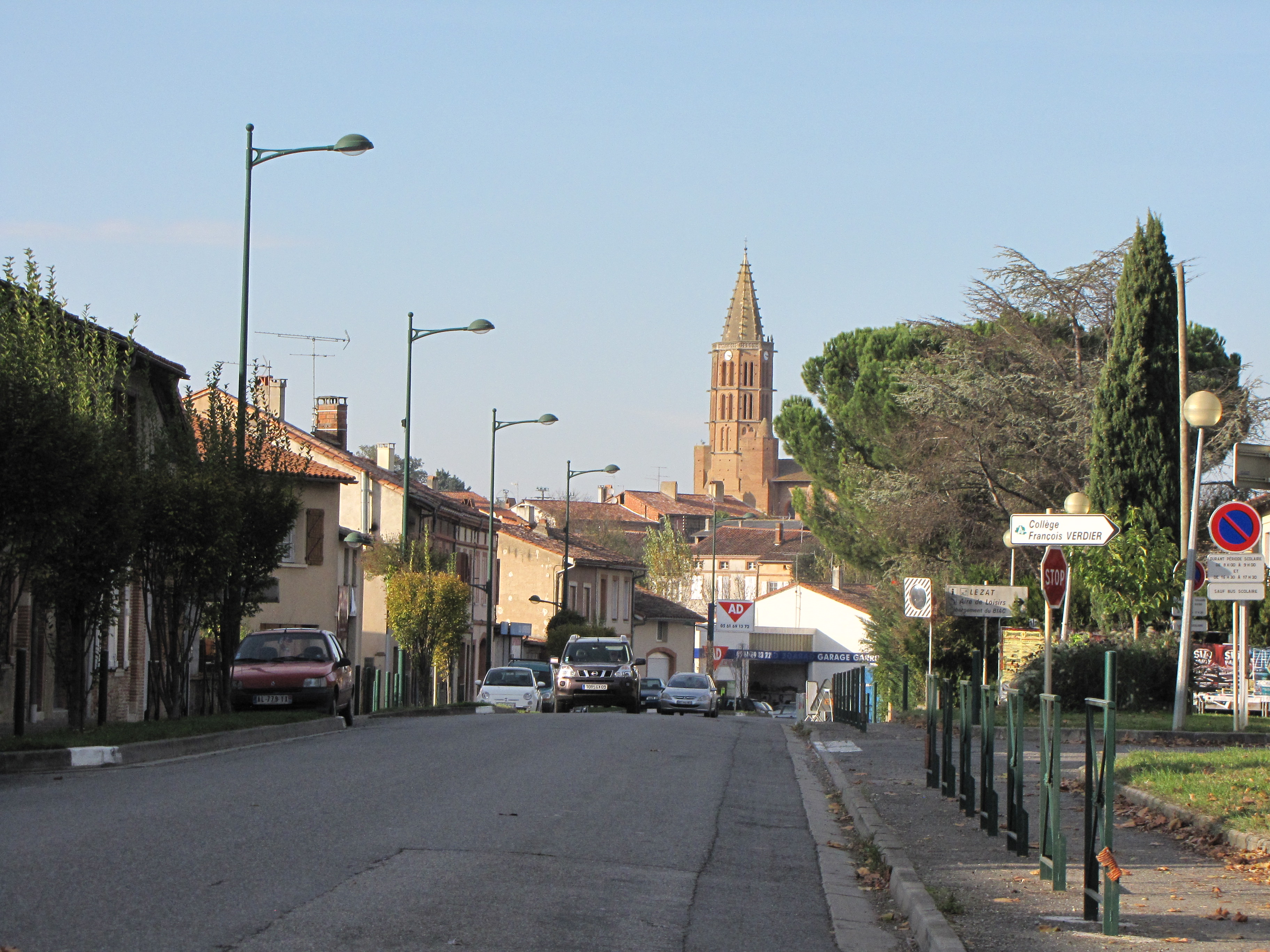
- A view towards the church in Lézat-sur-Lèze

- Coat of arms
- Location of Lézat-sur-Lèze
- Location within France Location within Occitanie
- Coordinates: 43°16′37″N 1°20′51″E
- Country: France
- Region: Occitania
- Department: Ariège
- Arrondissement: Saint-Girons
- Canton: Arize-Lèze

Government
  - Mayor (2020–2026): Jean-Claude Courneil
- Area^{1}: 40.13 km^{2} (15.49 sq mi)
- Elevation: 213 m (699 ft)
- Highest elevation: 315 m (1,033 ft)
- Lowest elevation: 197 m (646 ft)
- Population (2023): 2,321
  - Density: 57.84/km^{2} (149.8/sq mi)
- Time zone: UTC+01:00 (CET)
  - Summer (DST): UTC+02:00 (CEST)
- INSEE/Postal code: 09167 /09210
- ^{1} French Land Register data, which excludes lakes, ponds, glaciers > 1 km^{2} (0.386 sq mi or 247 acres) and river estuaries.

Lézat-sur-Lèze (French pronunciation: [leza syʁ lɛz], literally Lézat on Lèze; Languedocien: Lesat) is a commune in the Ariège department in southwestern France.

== Geography ==
The Lèze forms part of the commune's southern border, flows north through the commune, then forms part of its northern border.

== Population ==
Historical population
Year	Pop.	±% p.a.
1968	1,739	—
1975	1,861	+0.97%
1982	1,832	−0.22%
1990	1,964	+0.87%
1999	2,114	+0.82%
2007	2,253	+0.80%
2012	2,397	+1.25%
2017	2,323	−0.63%
2023	2,321	−0.01%
Source: INSEE

== Twin town ==
Lézat-sur-Lèze is twinned with Ateca in Spain.

== See also ==
- Communes of the Ariège department
