= Fronton AOC =

Fronton AOC (French pronunciation: [fʁɔ̃tɔ̃]) is an Appellation d'Origine Contrôlée (AOC) for wine in South West France in the département of Haute-Garonne and Tarn-et-Garonne, located about 35 km north of Toulouse.

== History ==
Fronton is an old wine production region with the first vines planted by the Romans on the land overlooking the valley of Tarn.

== Wines ==
- Most of the Fronton area wines (about 85%) are red wines made primarily of the Fronton's exclusive grape variety Négrette (minimum 50% in the blend). The Négrette (sometimes known as Pinot St. George when grown in the United States) gives the wine fruity and delicate features, providing a powerful red wine, dark and tannic, with aromas of violet and licorice. Reds reach their fullness between 4–7 years. Other grape varieties include Syrah, Côt, Cabernet Franc, Cabernet Sauvignon, Fer Servadou, Gamay, Cinsaut and Mauzac.
- Rosé wines (around 15% of production) are characterized by low acidity, and especially when négrette is present these wines are drunk young.

== Production ==
200 cooperative winery members and 60 wineries produce in total about 100,000 hectoliters yearly. The vineyards cover 2,300 hectares spread over 20 municipalities, including:

Haute-Garonne : Bouloc, Castelnau-d'Estrétefonds, Fronton, Saint-Rustice, Vacquiers, Villaudric, Villematier, Villemur-sur-Tarn et Villeneuve-lès-Bouloc

Tarn-et-Garonne : Bessens, Campsas, Canals, Dieupentale, Fabas, Grisolles, Labastide-Saint-Pierre, Montbartier, Nohic, Orgueil et Pompignan

== Wineries ==
Wineries include Domaine Roumagnac, Château Cransac, Château Joliet, Domaine Saint Guilhem, Domaine le Roc, Château Saint Louis.

== See also ==
- South West France
- Tourism in Tarn
