= Marguerite Canal =

French conductor, music educator and composer

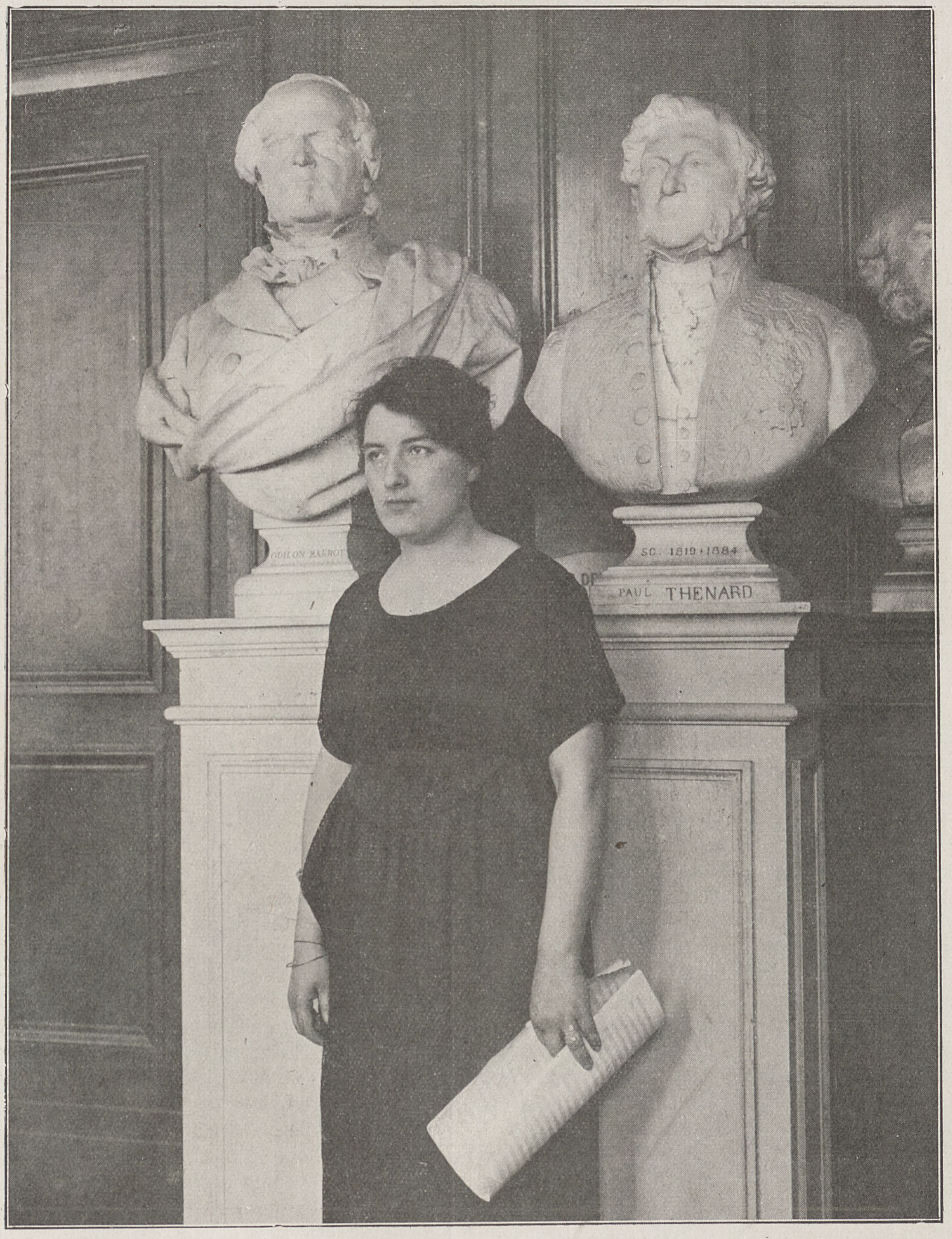
Canal in 1920

Marie-Marguerite-Denise Canal (29 January 1890 – 27 January 1978) was a French conductor, music educator and composer. She was born in Toulouse into a musical family, and her father introduced her to music and poetry. She studied singing and piano at the Paris Conservatoire in 1911, and after completing her work there, became a teacher at the Conservatoire.

In 1917, she became the first woman in France to conduct an orchestra. In 1919, she was named professor of singing at the Conservatoire and, in 1920, became only the second woman to receive the First Grand Prix of Rome in musical composition with Don Juan, with the congratulations of Camille Saint-Saëns. After winning, she left her teaching position to stay at the Villa Medici in Rome, Italy in 1925 but she returned to France in 1932 to resume her work there until her retirement.

The musicologist Mario Facchinetti said about her in 1956: "Marguerite Canal is an inspired composer who keeps to the French style of Fauré, Debussy and Duparc, a style that is sober, noble and pure."

She retired to Cepet, near Toulouse, France, and died there at almost 88 years of age.

== Works ==
Canal composed mainly for voice and instrument performance and was noted for songs. Selected works include:

- Don Juan, drama, 1920
- Requiem, 1921
- Sonata for Violin and Piano, 1922
- Le Jardin de L'Infante (A. Samain)
- Nell (Leconte de Lisle)
- Ici bas tous les lilas Meurent (Sully Prud'homme)
- Douceur du Soir (G. Rodenbach)
- Un grand sommeil noir (Verlaine)
- Ecoutez la chanson bien douce (Verlaine)
- Il pleure dans mon coeur (Verlaine)
- Amours triestes, song cycle
- Tlass alka, opera, (begun in 1922 but was never completed)

Her works have been recorded and issued on CD, including:

- Marguerite Canal (1890-1978) Songs, Sonata for Violin and Piano
