= Le Born =

Le Born is the name of two communes in France:

- Le Born, in the Haute-Garonne department
- Le Born, in the Lozère department
