= Bouloc =

Bouloc is the name or part of the name of the following communes in France:

- Bouloc, Haute-Garonne, in the Haute-Garonne department
- Bouloc-en-Quercy, in the Tarn-et-Garonne department
- Villeneuve-lès-Bouloc, in the Haute-Garonne department
