= Vacquier =

Vacquier is a French surname. Notable people with the surname include:

- Jean-Pierre Vaquier (1879–1924), French inventor and murderer
- Victor Vacquier (1907–2009), Russian geophysicist

== See also ==
- Vacquiers
