= Saint-Sauveur, Haute-Garonne =

Saint-Sauveur
- Commune
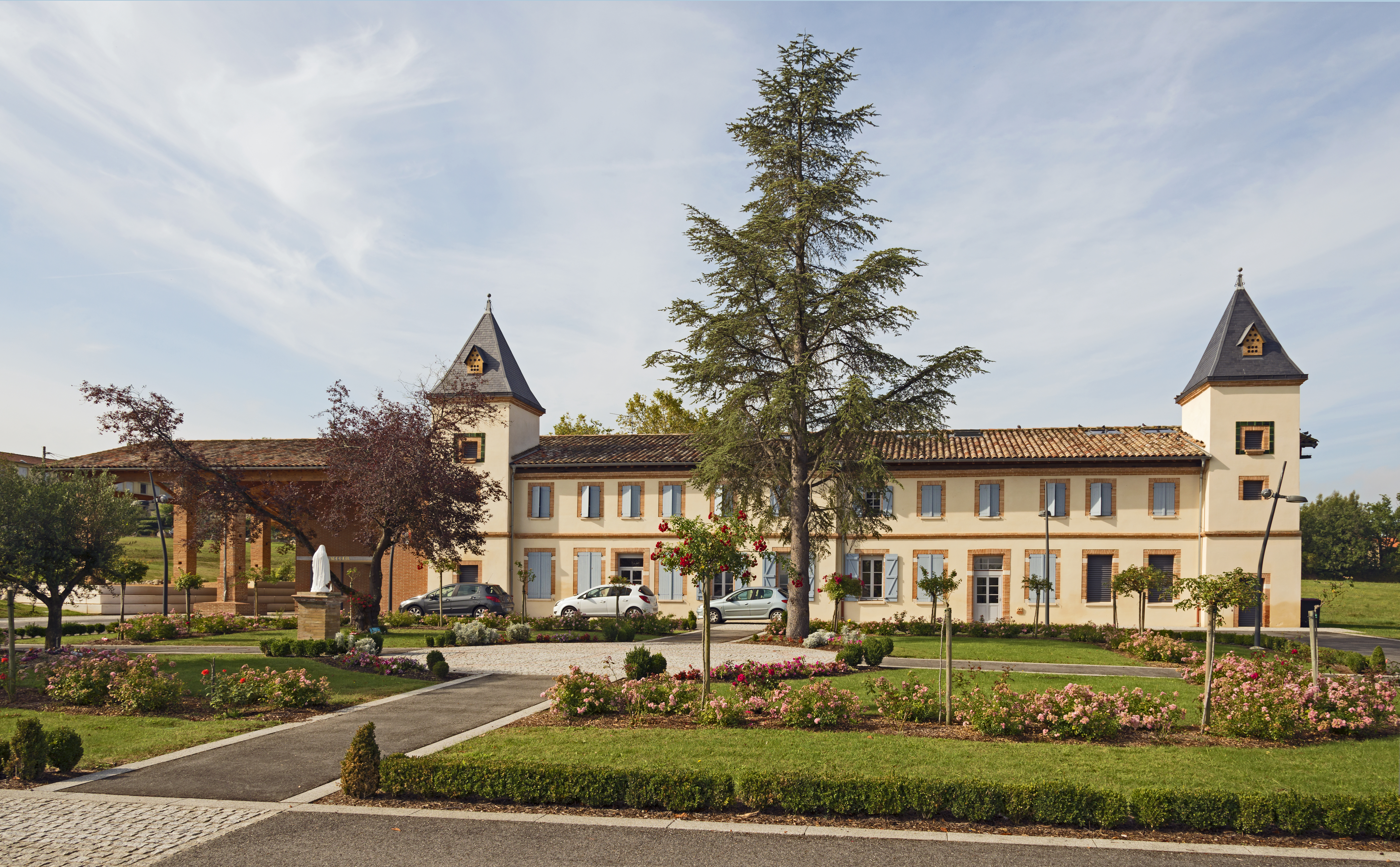
- The town hall in Saint-Sauveur

- Coat of arms
- Location of Saint-Sauveur
- Location within France Location within Occitanie
- Coordinates: 43°44′59″N 1°24′05″E
- Country: France
- Region: Occitania
- Department: Haute-Garonne
- Arrondissement: Toulouse
- Canton: Villemur-sur-Tarn

Government
  - Mayor (2020–2026): Philippe Petit
- Area^{1}: 7.04 km^{2} (2.72 sq mi)
- Elevation: 130 m (430 ft)
- Highest elevation: 175 m (574 ft)
- Lowest elevation: 112 m (367 ft)
- Population (2023): 2,243
  - Density: 319/km^{2} (825/sq mi)
- Time zone: UTC+01:00 (CET)
  - Summer (DST): UTC+02:00 (CEST)
- INSEE/Postal code: 31516 /31790
- ^{1} French Land Register data, which excludes lakes, ponds, glaciers > 1 km^{2} (0.386 sq mi or 247 acres) and river estuaries.

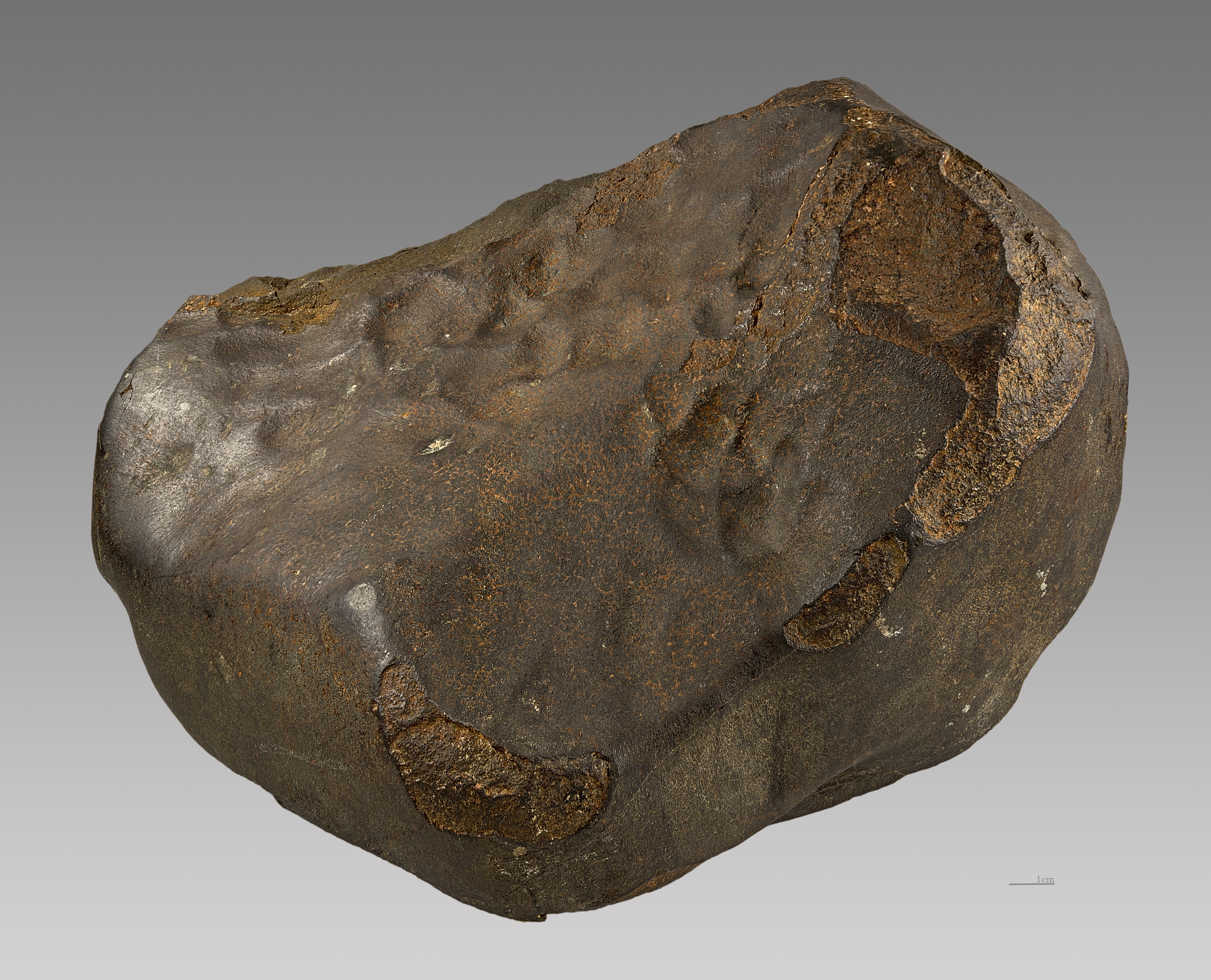
Chondrite EH5 « Saint-Sauveur » - MHNT

Saint-Sauveur (French pronunciation: [sɛ̃ sovœʁ]; Languedocien: Sent Salvador) is a commune in the Haute-Garonne department in southwestern France.

== Population ==
Historical population
Year	Pop.	±% p.a.
1968	538	—
1975	912	+7.83%
1982	1,093	+2.62%
1990	1,159	+0.74%
1999	1,309	+1.36%
2007	1,679	+3.16%
2012	1,781	+1.19%
2017	1,766	−0.17%
2023	2,243	+4.07%
Source: INSEE

== Sights ==
The Church of St Saviour, historical monument.

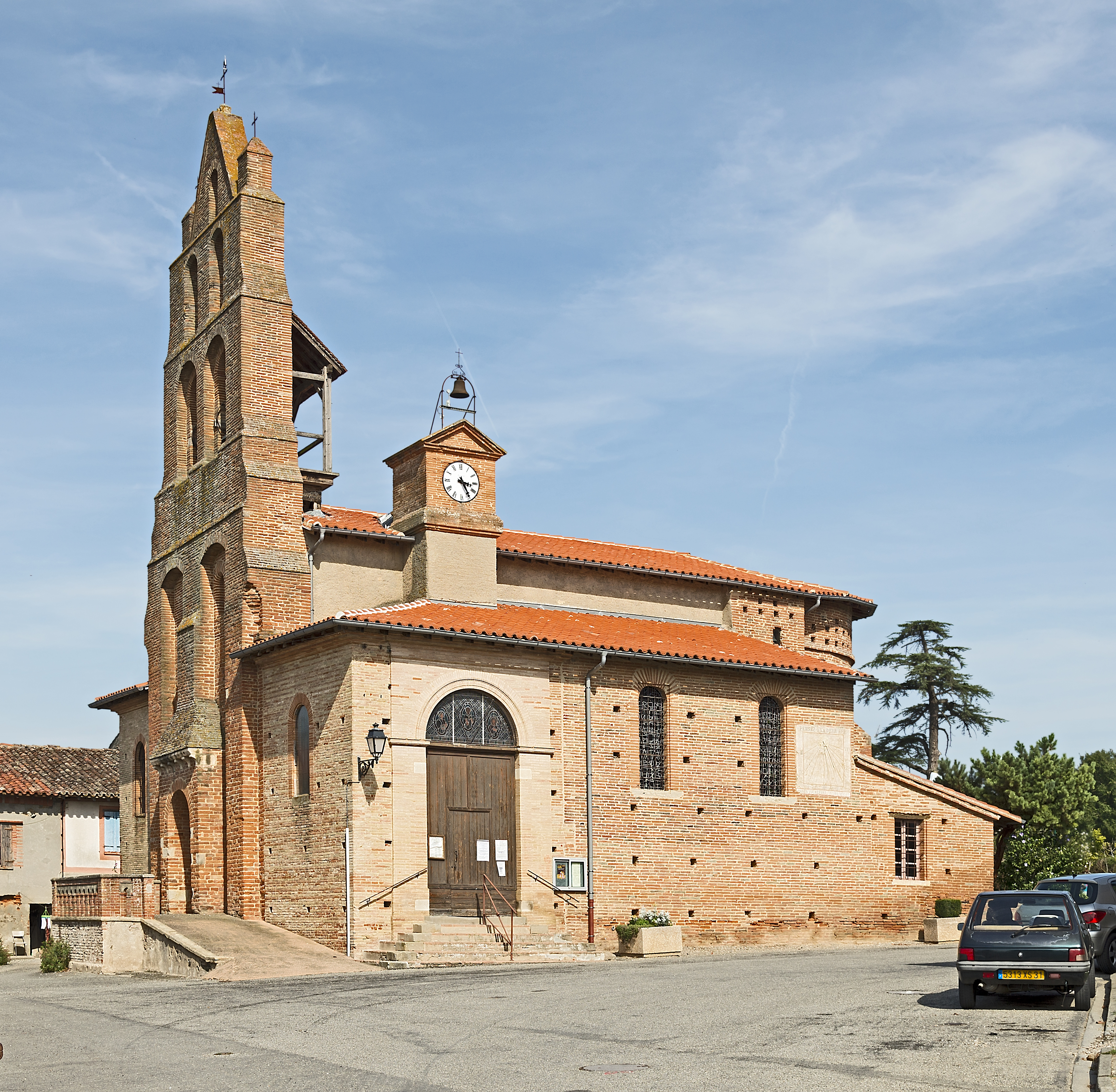

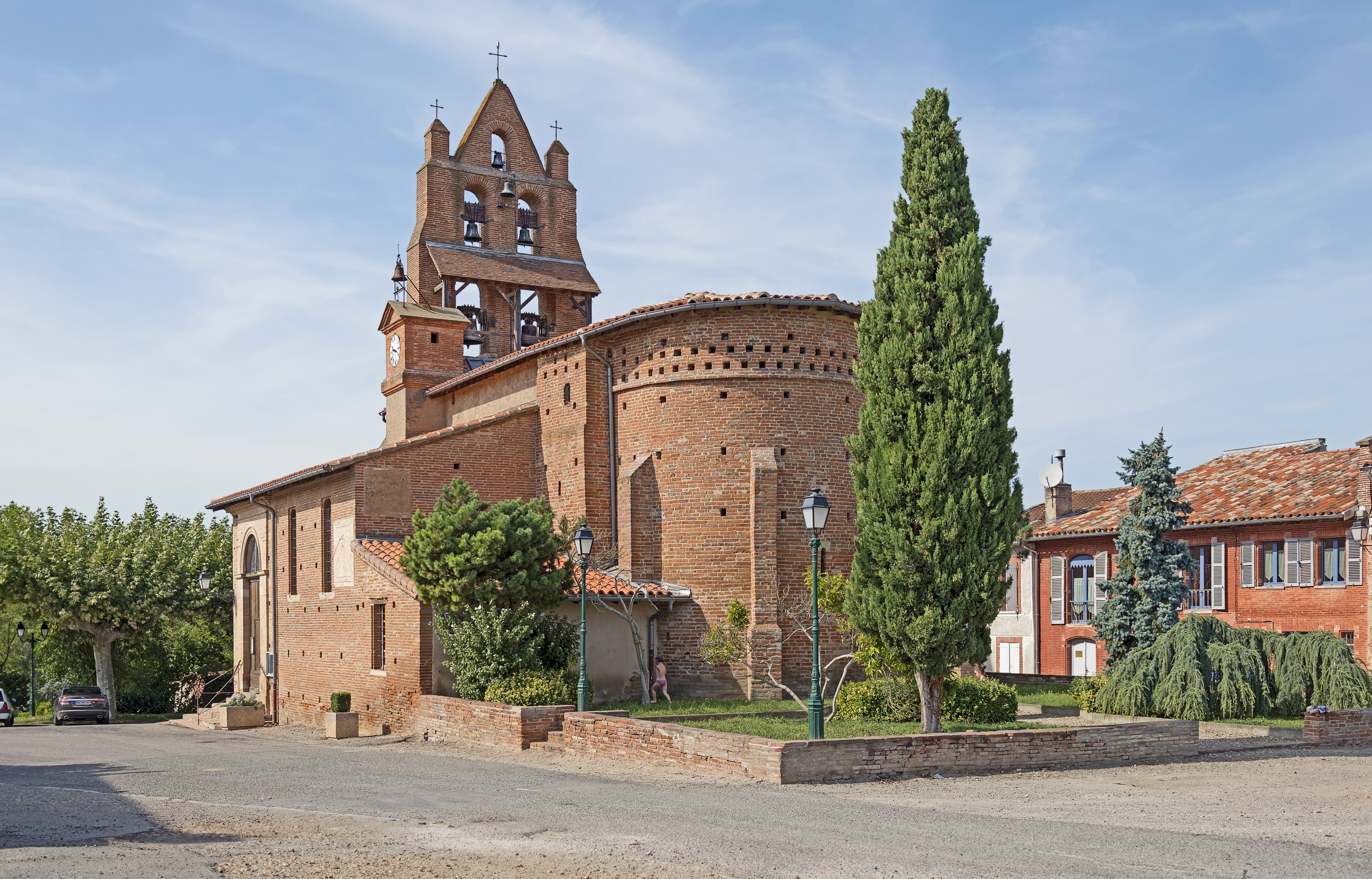

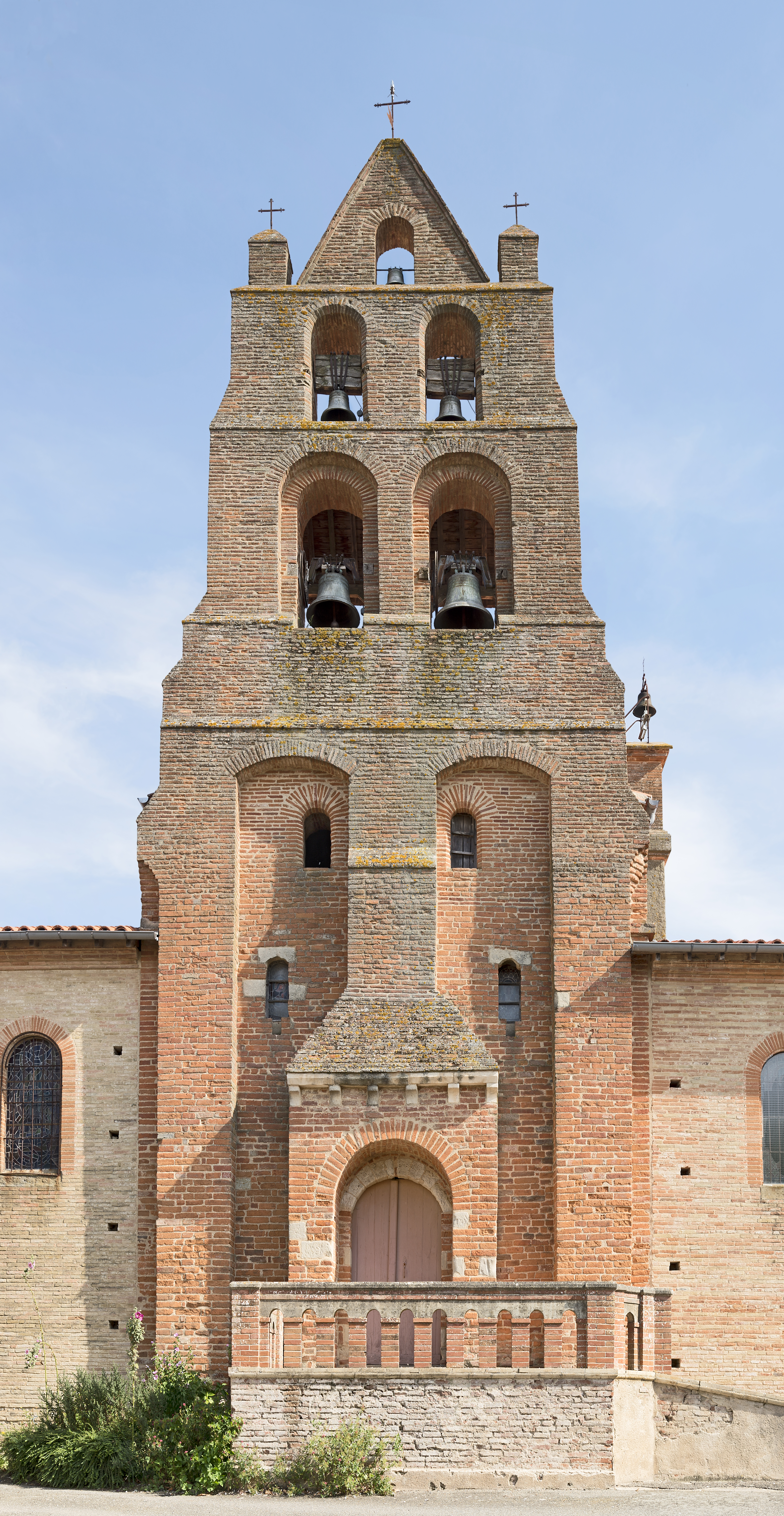

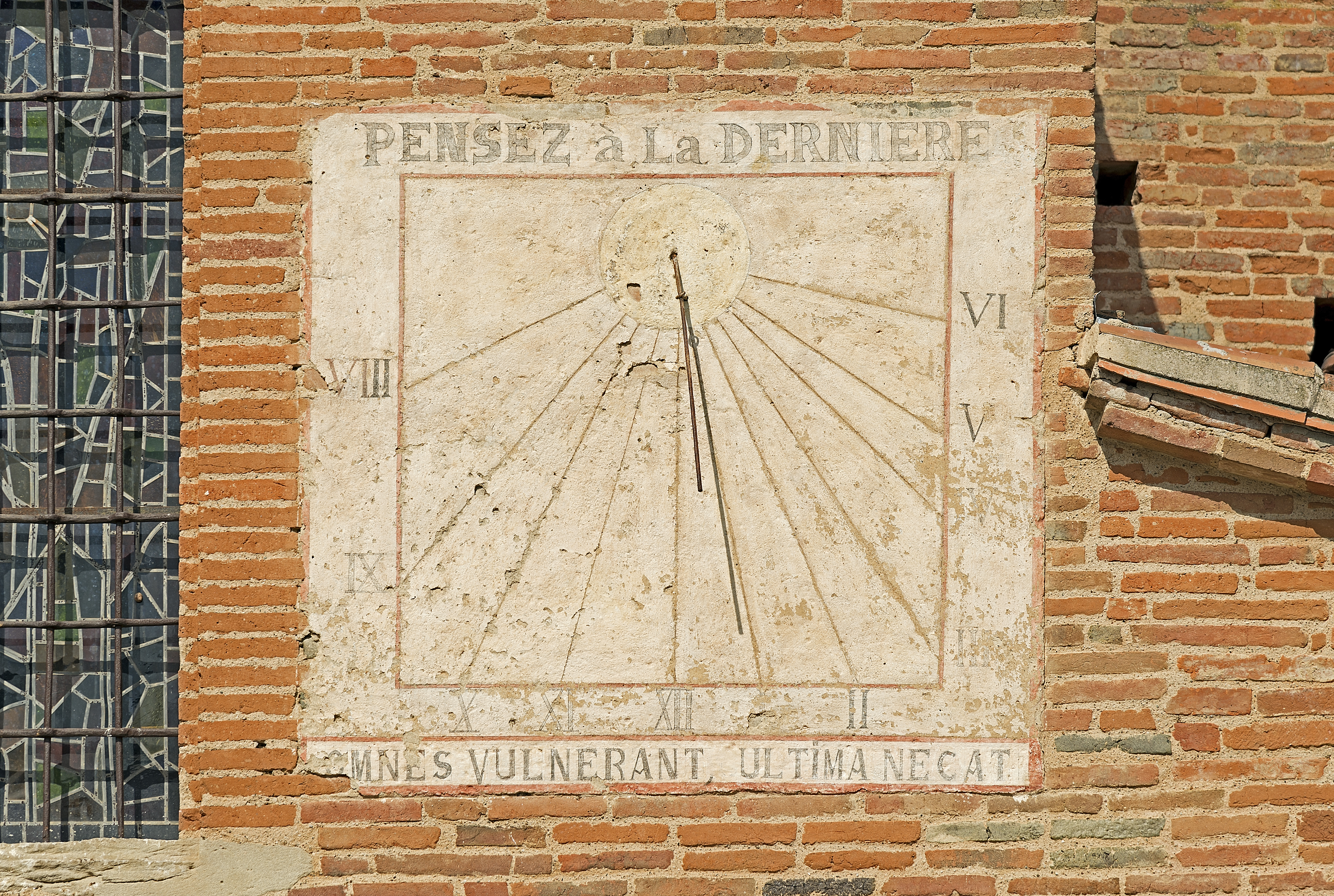

== See also ==
- Communes of the Haute-Garonne department
