= La Magdelaine-sur-Tarn =

- Commune
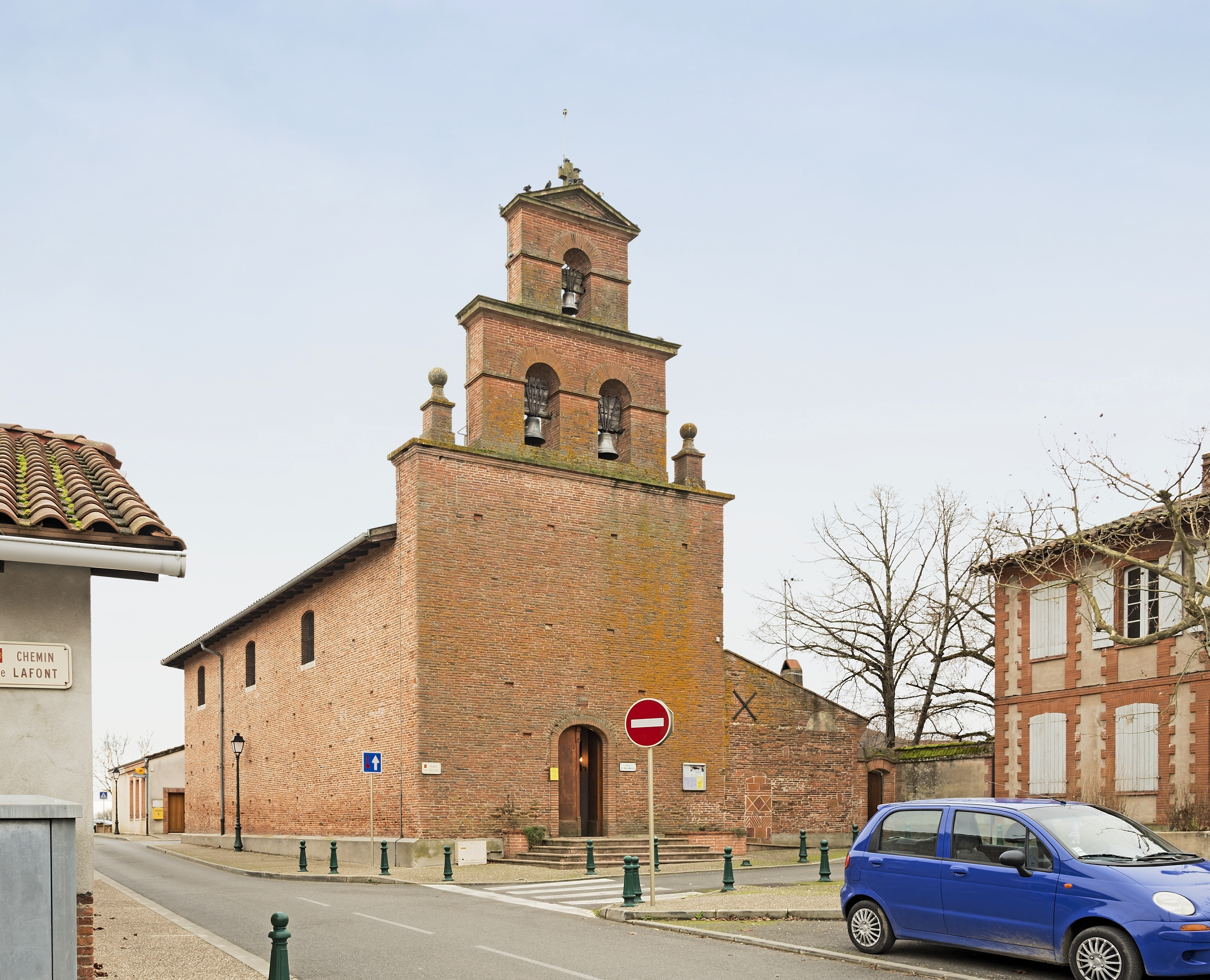
- The church in La Magdelaine-sur-Tarn
- Location of La Magdelaine-sur-Tarn
- Location within France Location within Occitanie
- Coordinates: 43°48′46″N 1°32′34″E
- Country: France
- Region: Occitania
- Department: Haute-Garonne
- Arrondissement: Toulouse
- Canton: Villemur-sur-Tarn
- Intercommunality: Val'Aïgo

Government
  - Mayor (2020–2026): Isabelle Gayraud
- Area^{1}: 6.82 km^{2} (2.63 sq mi)
- Elevation: 116 m (381 ft)
- Highest elevation: 122 m (400 ft)
- Lowest elevation: 85 m (279 ft)
- Population (2023): 1,254
  - Density: 184/km^{2} (476/sq mi)
- Time zone: UTC+01:00 (CET)
  - Summer (DST): UTC+02:00 (CEST)
- INSEE/Postal code: 31311 /31340
- ^{1} French Land Register data, which excludes lakes, ponds, glaciers > 1 km^{2} (0.386 sq mi or 247 acres) and river estuaries.

La Magdelaine-sur-Tarn (French pronunciation: [la maɡdəlɛn syʁ taʁn], literally La Magdelaine on Tarn; Occitan: La Magdalena de Tarn) is a commune in the Haute-Garonne department in southwestern France.

== Population ==
Historical population
Year	Pop.	±% p.a.
1968	235	—
1975	258	+1.34%
1982	392	+6.16%
1990	492	+2.88%
1999	609	+2.40%
2007	948	+5.69%
2012	1,093	+2.89%
2017	1,171	+1.39%
2023	1,254	+1.15%
Source: INSEE

== Monuments ==
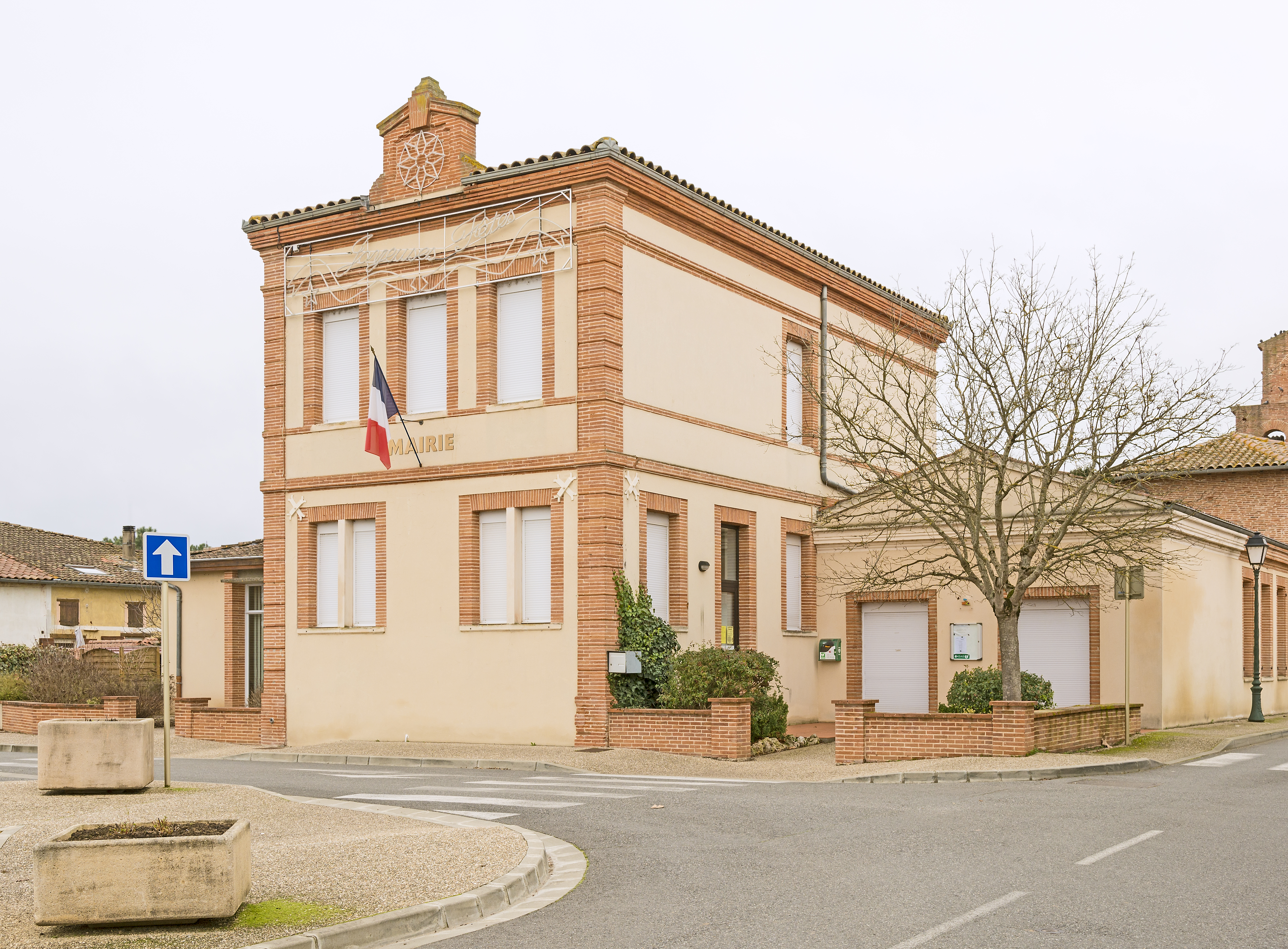
Town hall

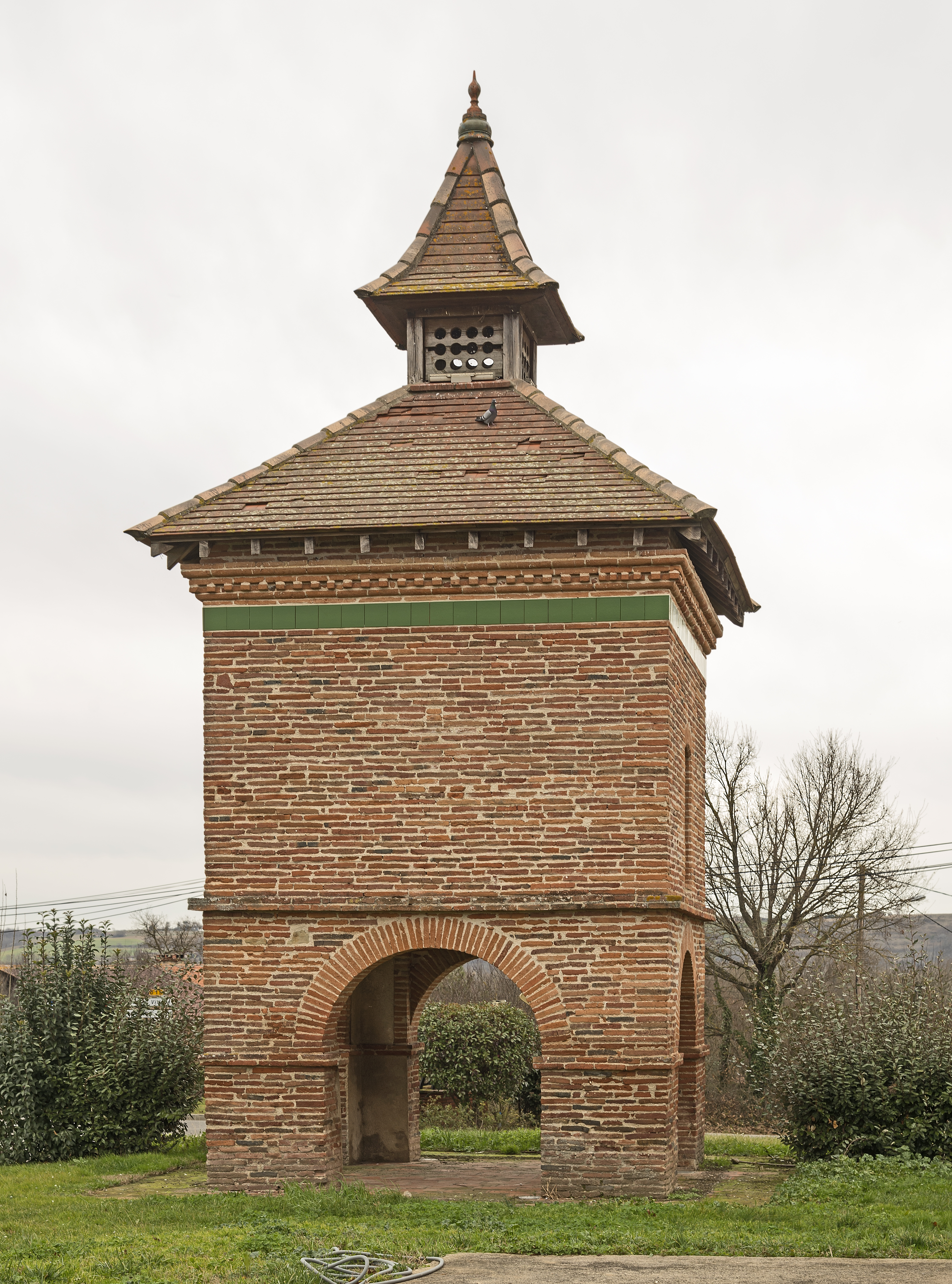
Dovecote tower

== See also ==
- Communes of the Haute-Garonne department
