= Layrac-sur-Tarn =

Layrac-sur-Tarn Lairac de Tarn (Occitan)
- Commune
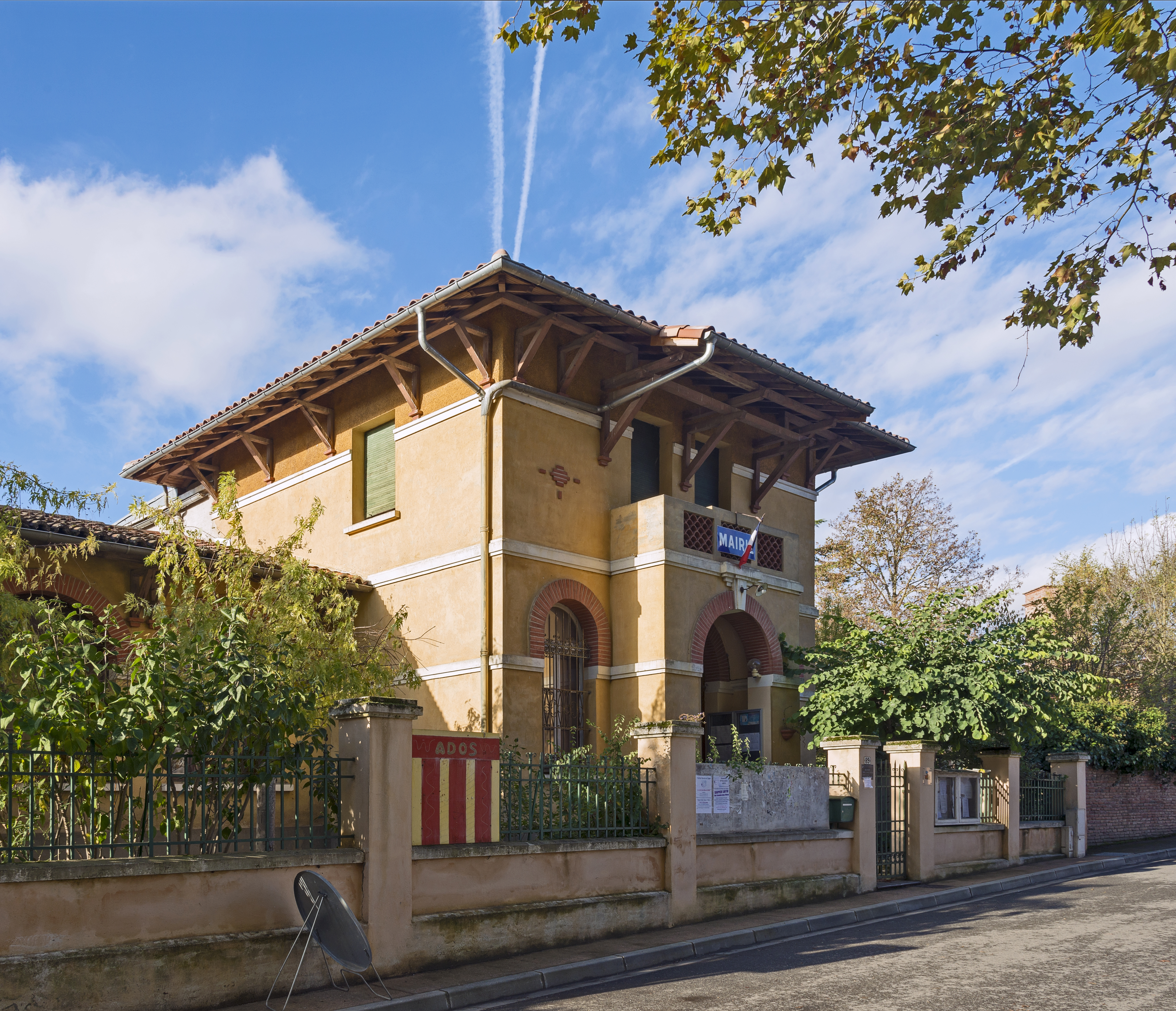
- Town hall

- Coat of arms
- Location of Layrac-sur-Tarn
- Location within France Location within Occitanie
- Coordinates: 43°50′06″N 1°33′22″E
- Country: France
- Region: Occitania
- Department: Haute-Garonne
- Arrondissement: Toulouse
- Canton: Villemur-sur-Tarn
- Intercommunality: Val'Aïgo

Government
  - Mayor (2020–2026): Thierry Astruc
- Area^{1}: 7.25 km^{2} (2.80 sq mi)
- Elevation: 104 m (341 ft)
- Highest elevation: 223 m (732 ft)
- Lowest elevation: 86 m (282 ft)
- Population (2023): 320
  - Density: 44/km^{2} (110/sq mi)
- Time zone: UTC+01:00 (CET)
  - Summer (DST): UTC+02:00 (CEST)
- INSEE/Postal code: 31288 /31340
- ^{1} French Land Register data, which excludes lakes, ponds, glaciers > 1 km^{2} (0.386 sq mi or 247 acres) and river estuaries.

Layrac-sur-Tarn (French pronunciation: [lɛʁak syʁ taʁn], literally Layrac on Tarn; Languedocien: Lairac de Tarn) is a commune in the Haute-Garonne department in southwestern France.

== Population ==
Historical population
Year	Pop.	±% p.a.
1968	318	—
1975	310	−0.36%
1982	307	−0.14%
1990	319	+0.48%
1999	264	−2.08%
2007	314	+2.19%
2012	327	+0.81%
2017	322	−0.31%
2023	320	−0.10%
Source: INSEE

== Sights ==
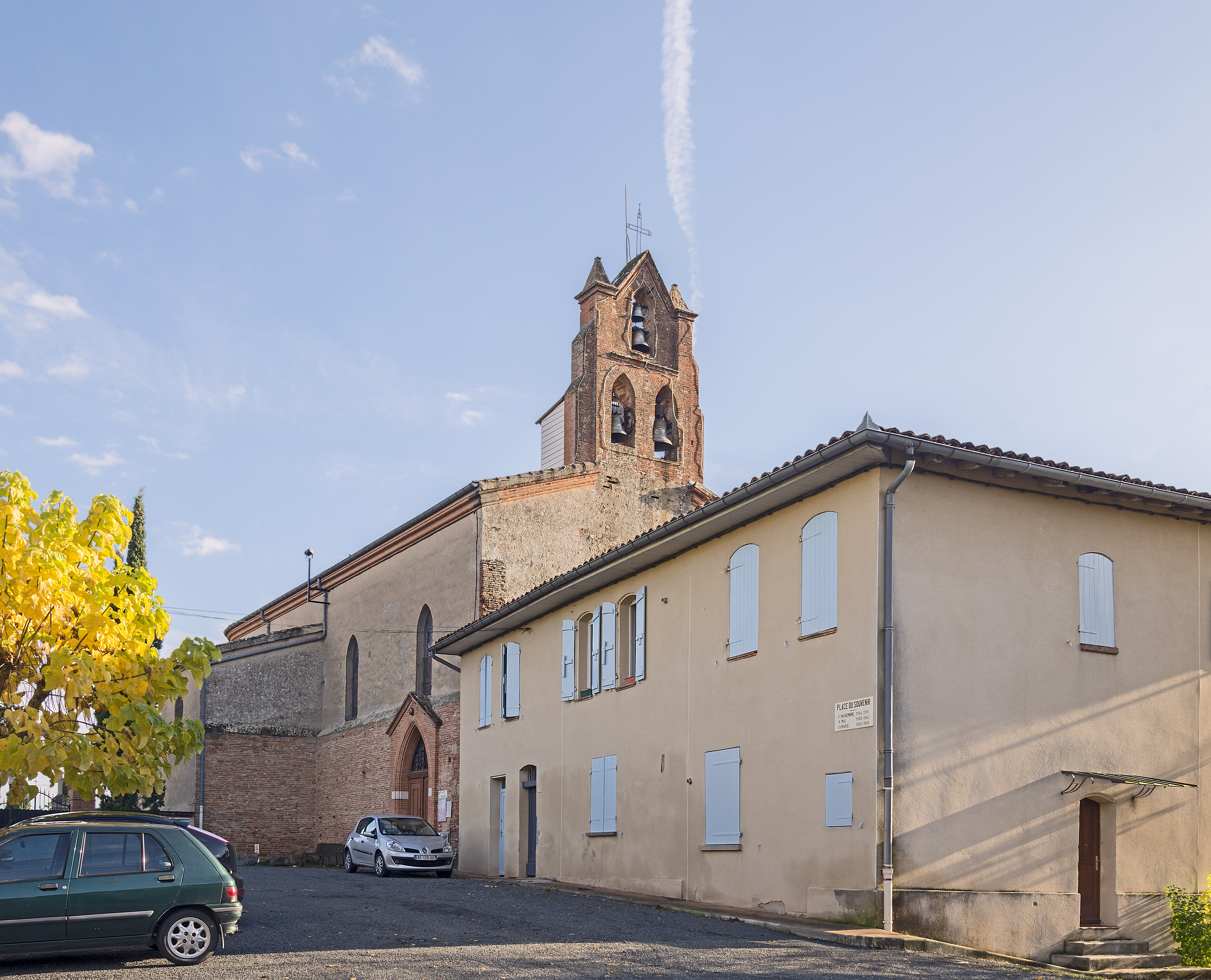
Church

== See also ==
- Communes of the Haute-Garonne department
