= Bondigoux =

- Commune
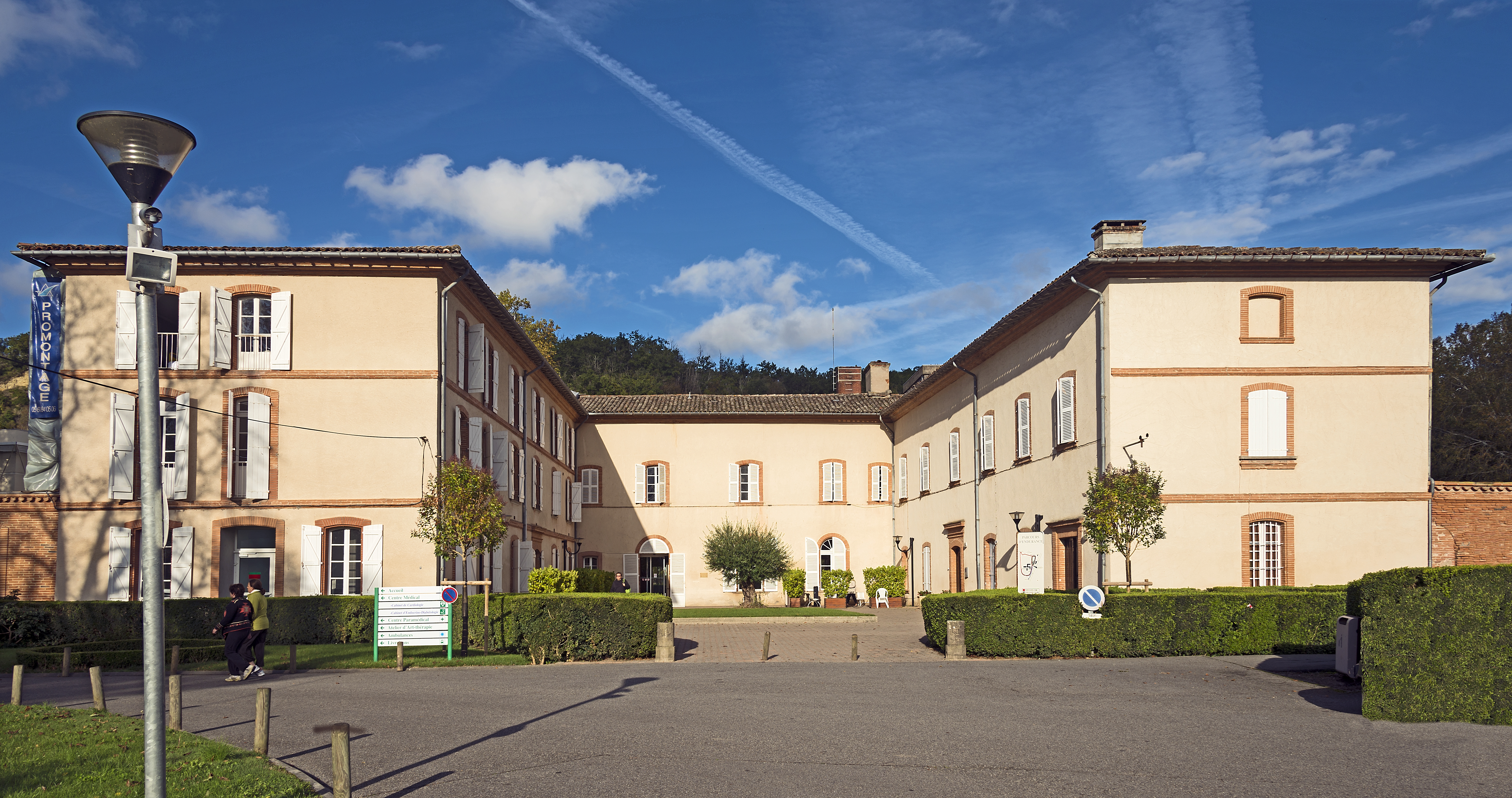
- Chateau of Vernhes
- Location of Bondigoux
- Location within France Location within Occitanie
- Coordinates: 43°50′27″N 1°32′28″E
- Country: France
- Region: Occitania
- Department: Haute-Garonne
- Arrondissement: Toulouse
- Canton: Villemur-sur-Tarn
- Intercommunality: Val'Aïgo

Government
  - Mayor (2020–2026): Didier Roux
- Area^{1}: 7.46 km^{2} (2.88 sq mi)
- Elevation: 120 m (390 ft)
- Highest elevation: 201 m (659 ft)
- Lowest elevation: 86 m (282 ft)
- Population (2023): 766
  - Density: 103/km^{2} (266/sq mi)
- Time zone: UTC+01:00 (CET)
  - Summer (DST): UTC+02:00 (CEST)
- INSEE/Postal code: 31073 /31340
- ^{1} French Land Register data, which excludes lakes, ponds, glaciers > 1 km^{2} (0.386 sq mi or 247 acres) and river estuaries.

Bondigoux (French pronunciation: [bɔ̃diɡu]; Occitan: Bondigós) is a commune in the Haute-Garonne department in southwestern France.

== Population ==
Historical population
Year	Pop.	±% p.a.
1968	339	—
1975	294	−2.01%
1982	260	−1.74%
1990	299	+1.76%
1999	320	+0.76%
2007	424	+3.58%
2012	489	+2.89%
2017	537	+1.89%
2023	766	+6.10%
Source: INSEE

== See also ==
- Communes of the Haute-Garonne department
