= Gargas, Haute-Garonne =

Gargas
- Commune
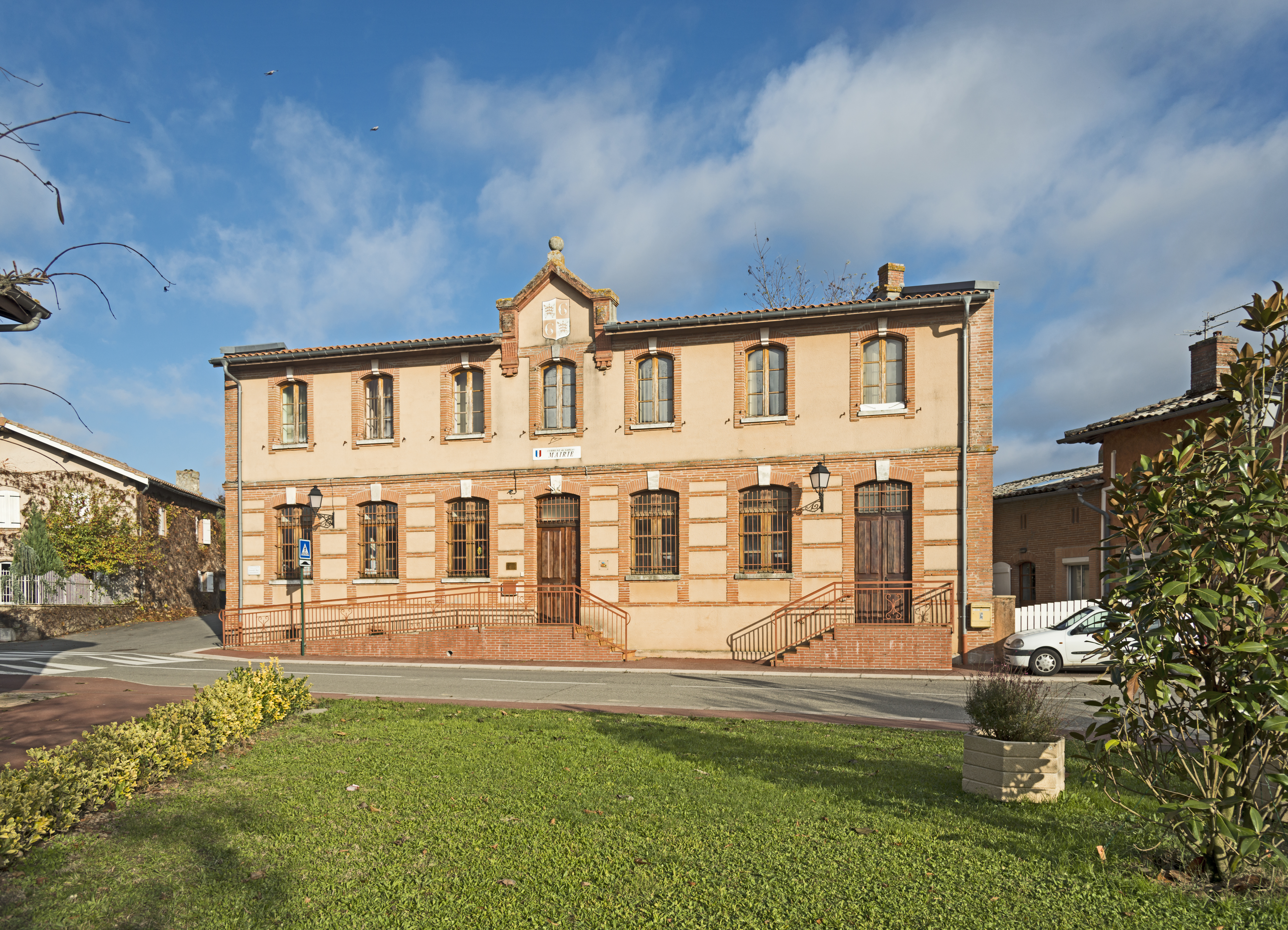
- The town hall in Gargas

- Coat of arms
- Location of Gargas
- Location within France Location within Occitanie
- Coordinates: 43°45′28″N 1°28′06″E
- Country: France
- Region: Occitania
- Department: Haute-Garonne
- Arrondissement: Toulouse
- Canton: Villemur-sur-Tarn

Government
  - Mayor (2020–2026): Jeanine Gibert
- Area^{1}: 7.28 km^{2} (2.81 sq mi)
- Elevation: 170 m (560 ft)
- Highest elevation: 196 m (643 ft)
- Lowest elevation: 126 m (413 ft)
- Population (2023): 785
  - Density: 108/km^{2} (279/sq mi)
- Time zone: UTC+01:00 (CET)
  - Summer (DST): UTC+02:00 (CEST)
- INSEE/Postal code: 31211 /31620
- ^{1} French Land Register data, which excludes lakes, ponds, glaciers > 1 km^{2} (0.386 sq mi or 247 acres) and river estuaries.

Gargas is a commune in the Haute-Garonne department in southwestern France.

== Population ==
Historical population
Year	Pop.	±% p.a.
1968	172	—
1975	262	+6.20%
1982	316	+2.71%
1990	425	+3.77%
1999	520	+2.27%
2007	600	+1.80%
2012	668	+2.17%
2017	685	+0.50%
2023	785	+2.30%
Source: INSEE

== Sights ==
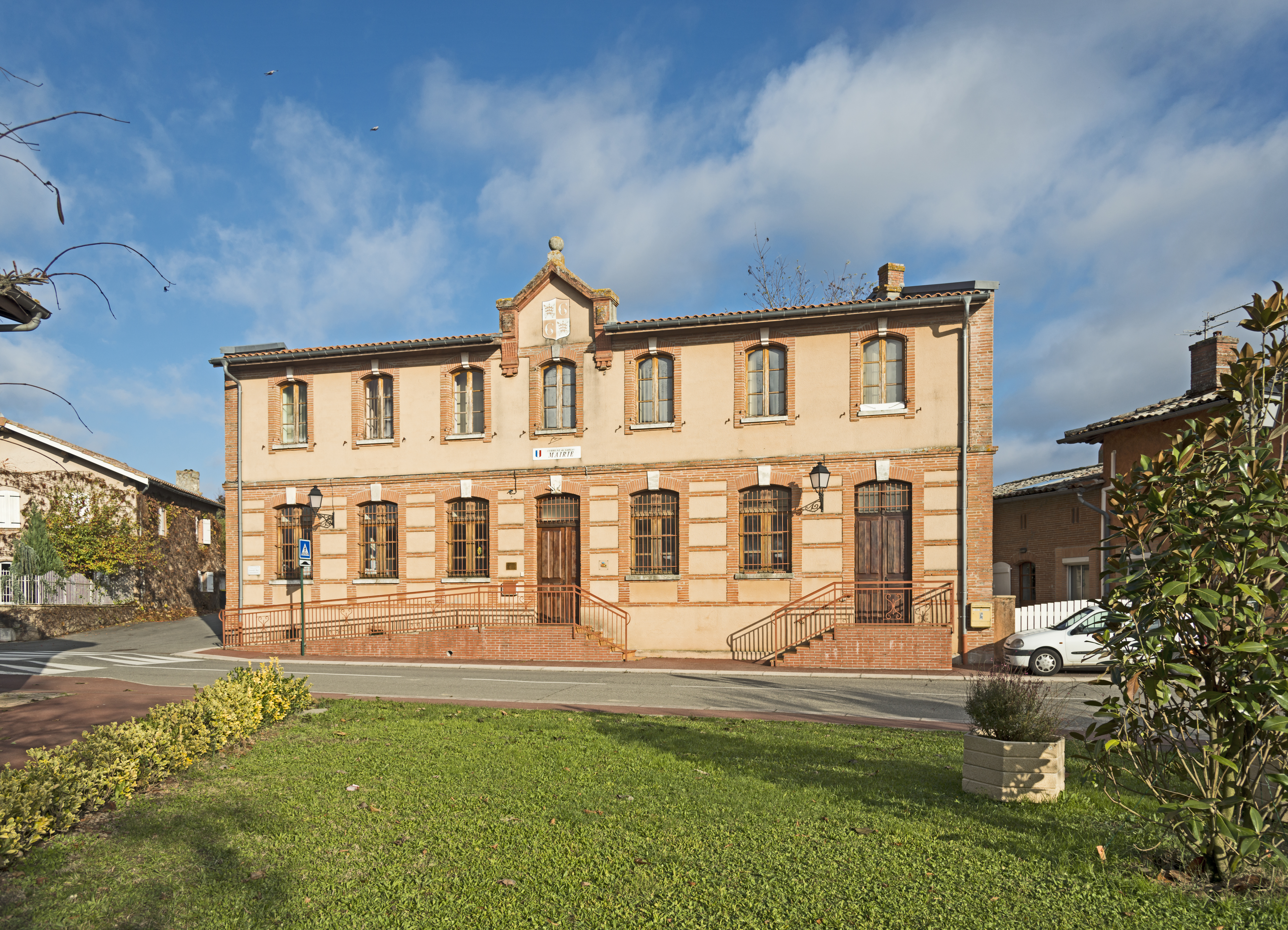
The Town Hall

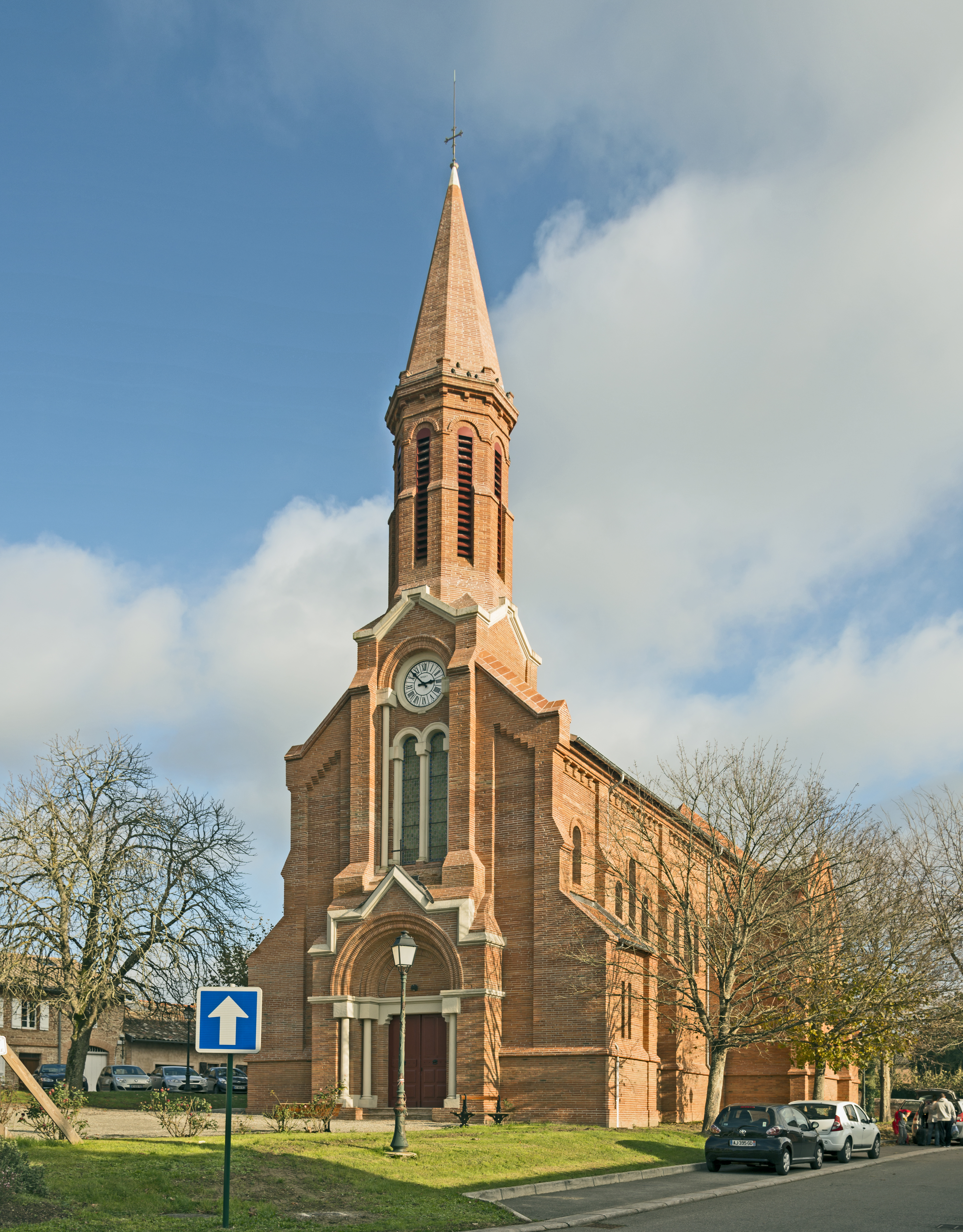
The church

== See also ==
- Communes of the Haute-Garonne department
