= Canton of Villemur-sur-Tarn =

Coordinates: 43.87°N 1.50°E

The canton of Villemur-sur-Tarn is an administrative division of the Haute-Garonne department, southern France. Its borders were modified at the French canton reorganisation which came into effect in March 2015. Its seat is in Villemur-sur-Tarn.

It consists of the following communes:

1. Bessières
2. Bondigoux
3. Le Born
4. Bouloc
5. Buzet-sur-Tarn
6. Castelnau-d'Estrétefonds
7. Cépet
8. Fronton
9. Gargas
10. Layrac-sur-Tarn
11. La Magdelaine-sur-Tarn
12. Mirepoix-sur-Tarn
13. Saint-Rustice
14. Saint-Sauveur
15. Vacquiers
16. Villaudric
17. Villematier
18. Villemur-sur-Tarn
19. Villeneuve-lès-Bouloc
