= Cépet =

- Commune
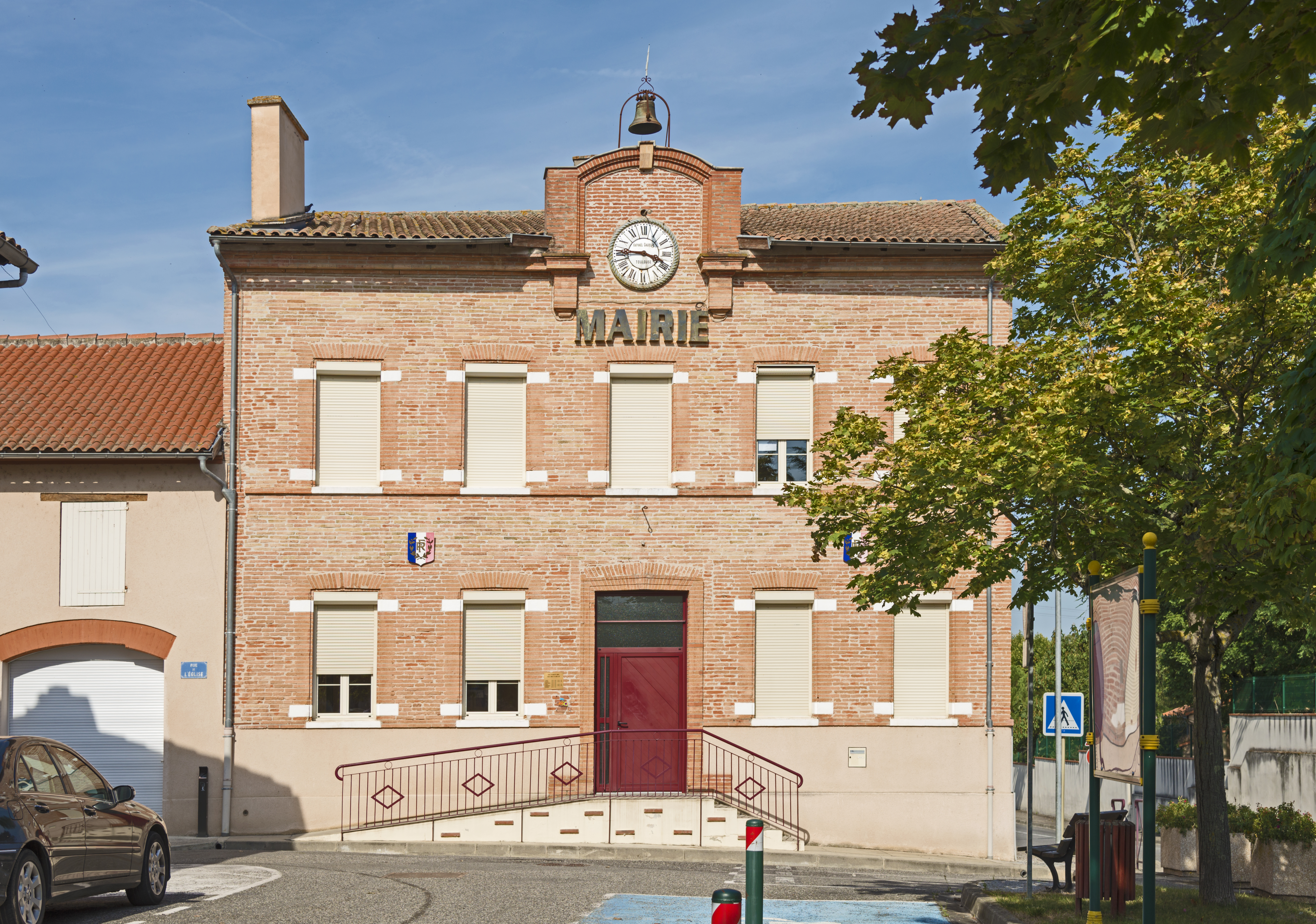
- Town hall

- Coat of arms
- Location of Cépet
- Location within France Location within Occitanie
- Coordinates: 43°45′02″N 1°25′55″E
- Country: France
- Region: Occitania
- Department: Haute-Garonne
- Arrondissement: Toulouse
- Canton: Villemur-sur-Tarn

Government
  - Mayor (2020–2026): Colette Solomiac
- Area^{1}: 7.11 km^{2} (2.75 sq mi)
- Elevation: 118 m (387 ft)
- Highest elevation: 185 m (607 ft)
- Lowest elevation: 123 m (404 ft)
- Population (2023): 2,389
  - Density: 336/km^{2} (870/sq mi)
- Time zone: UTC+01:00 (CET)
  - Summer (DST): UTC+02:00 (CEST)
- INSEE/Postal code: 31136 /31620
- ^{1} French Land Register data, which excludes lakes, ponds, glaciers > 1 km^{2} (0.386 sq mi or 247 acres) and river estuaries.

Cépet (French pronunciation: [sepɛ]; Occitan: Cepet) is a commune in the Haute-Garonne department in southwestern France.

== Population ==
Historical population
Year	Pop.	±% p.a.
1968	481	—
1975	697	+5.44%
1982	908	+3.85%
1990	1,023	+1.50%
1999	1,315	+2.83%
2007	1,477	+1.46%
2012	1,655	+2.30%
2017	1,878	+2.56%
2023	2,389	+4.09%
Source: INSEE

== See also ==
- Communes of the Haute-Garonne department
