= Villematier =

- Commune
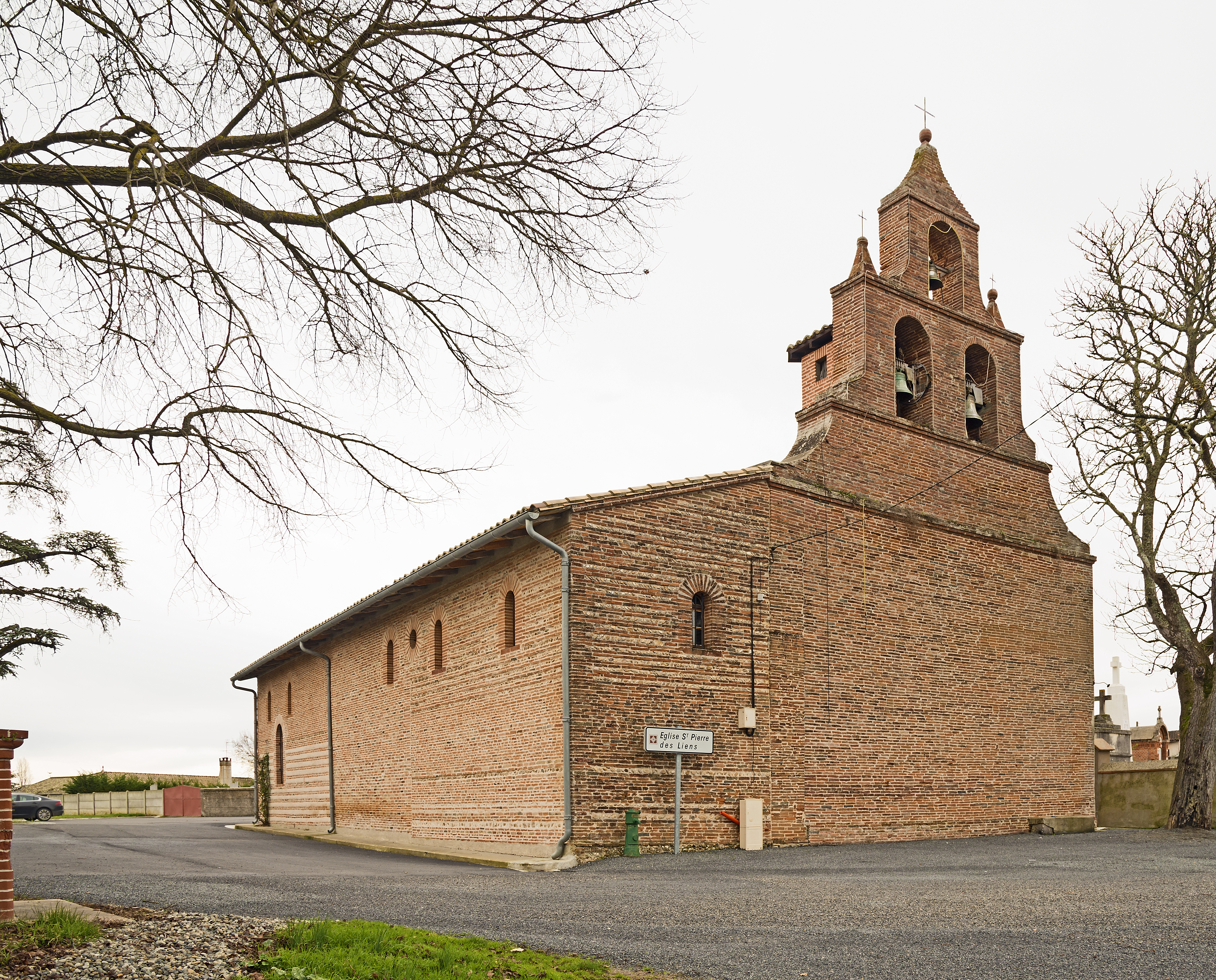
- The church in Villematier

- Coat of arms
- Location of Villematier
- Location within France Location within Occitanie
- Coordinates: 43°49′48″N 1°30′33″E
- Country: France
- Region: Occitania
- Department: Haute-Garonne
- Arrondissement: Toulouse
- Canton: Villemur-sur-Tarn
- Intercommunality: Val'Aïgo

Government
  - Mayor (2020–2026): Jean-Michel Jilibert
- Area^{1}: 14.96 km^{2} (5.78 sq mi)
- Elevation: 103 m (338 ft)
- Highest elevation: 156 m (512 ft)
- Lowest elevation: 85 m (279 ft)
- Population (2023): 1,133
  - Density: 75.74/km^{2} (196.2/sq mi)
- Time zone: UTC+01:00 (CET)
  - Summer (DST): UTC+02:00 (CEST)
- INSEE/Postal code: 31583 /31340
- ^{1} French Land Register data, which excludes lakes, ponds, glaciers > 1 km^{2} (0.386 sq mi or 247 acres) and river estuaries.

Villematier (French pronunciation: [vilmatje]; Occitan: Vilamatièr) is a commune in the Haute-Garonne department in southwestern France.

== Geography ==
=== Climate ===
Villematier has an oceanic climate (Köppen climate classification Cfb) closely bordering on a humid subtropical climate (Cfa). The average annual temperature in Villematier is 13.5 °C (56.3 °F). The average annual rainfall is 722.1 mm (28.43 in) with April as the wettest month. The temperatures are highest on average in July, at around 21.8 °C (71.2 °F), and lowest in January, at around 5.7 °C (42.3 °F). The highest temperature ever recorded in Villematier was 41.0 °C (105.8 °F) on 4 August 2003; the coldest temperature ever recorded was −13.5 °C (7.7 °F) on 9 February 2012.

Climate data for Villematier (1981−2010 normals, extremes 1994−2016)
Month	Jan	Feb	Mar	Apr	May	Jun	Jul	Aug	Sep	Oct	Nov	Dec	Year
Record high °C (°F)	19.5 (67.1)	24.5 (76.1)	27.0 (80.6)	31.0 (87.8)	34.5 (94.1)	40.0 (104.0)	39.5 (103.1)	41.0 (105.8)	37.0 (98.6)	32.0 (89.6)	25.0 (77.0)	20.5 (68.9)	41.0 (105.8)
Mean daily maximum °C (°F)	10.2 (50.4)	12.0 (53.6)	16.0 (60.8)	18.7 (65.7)	22.9 (73.2)	27.1 (80.8)	29.0 (84.2)	28.9 (84.0)	25.3 (77.5)	20.9 (69.6)	13.7 (56.7)	10.0 (50.0)	19.6 (67.3)
Daily mean °C (°F)	5.7 (42.3)	6.7 (44.1)	9.5 (49.1)	12.1 (53.8)	16.4 (61.5)	20.2 (68.4)	21.8 (71.2)	21.7 (71.1)	17.9 (64.2)	14.6 (58.3)	8.8 (47.8)	5.8 (42.4)	13.5 (56.3)
Mean daily minimum °C (°F)	1.1 (34.0)	1.3 (34.3)	3.1 (37.6)	5.5 (41.9)	9.9 (49.8)	13.3 (55.9)	14.6 (58.3)	14.4 (57.9)	10.5 (50.9)	8.4 (47.1)	3.9 (39.0)	1.5 (34.7)	7.3 (45.1)
Record low °C (°F)	−9.5 (14.9)	−13.5 (7.7)	−10.0 (14.0)	−2.5 (27.5)	2.0 (35.6)	5.0 (41.0)	7.0 (44.6)	5.0 (41.0)	2.0 (35.6)	−4.0 (24.8)	−8.5 (16.7)	−11.0 (12.2)	−13.5 (7.7)
Average precipitation mm (inches)	62.4 (2.46)	49.7 (1.96)	49.4 (1.94)	77.4 (3.05)	72.2 (2.84)	54.1 (2.13)	43.2 (1.70)	51.5 (2.03)	67.8 (2.67)	61.5 (2.42)	67.6 (2.66)	65.3 (2.57)	722.1 (28.43)
Average precipitation days (≥ 1.0 mm)	11.6	9.3	8.8	10.6	10.1	7.0	6.1	6.9	8.4	8.9	11.8	11.4	110.9
Source: Météo-France

== Population ==
Historical population
Year	Pop.	±% p.a.
1968	652	—
1975	714	+1.31%
1982	827	+2.12%
1990	828	+0.02%
1999	861	+0.44%
2007	945	+1.17%
2012	1,028	+1.70%
2017	1,053	+0.48%
2023	1,133	+1.23%
Source: INSEE

== Sights ==
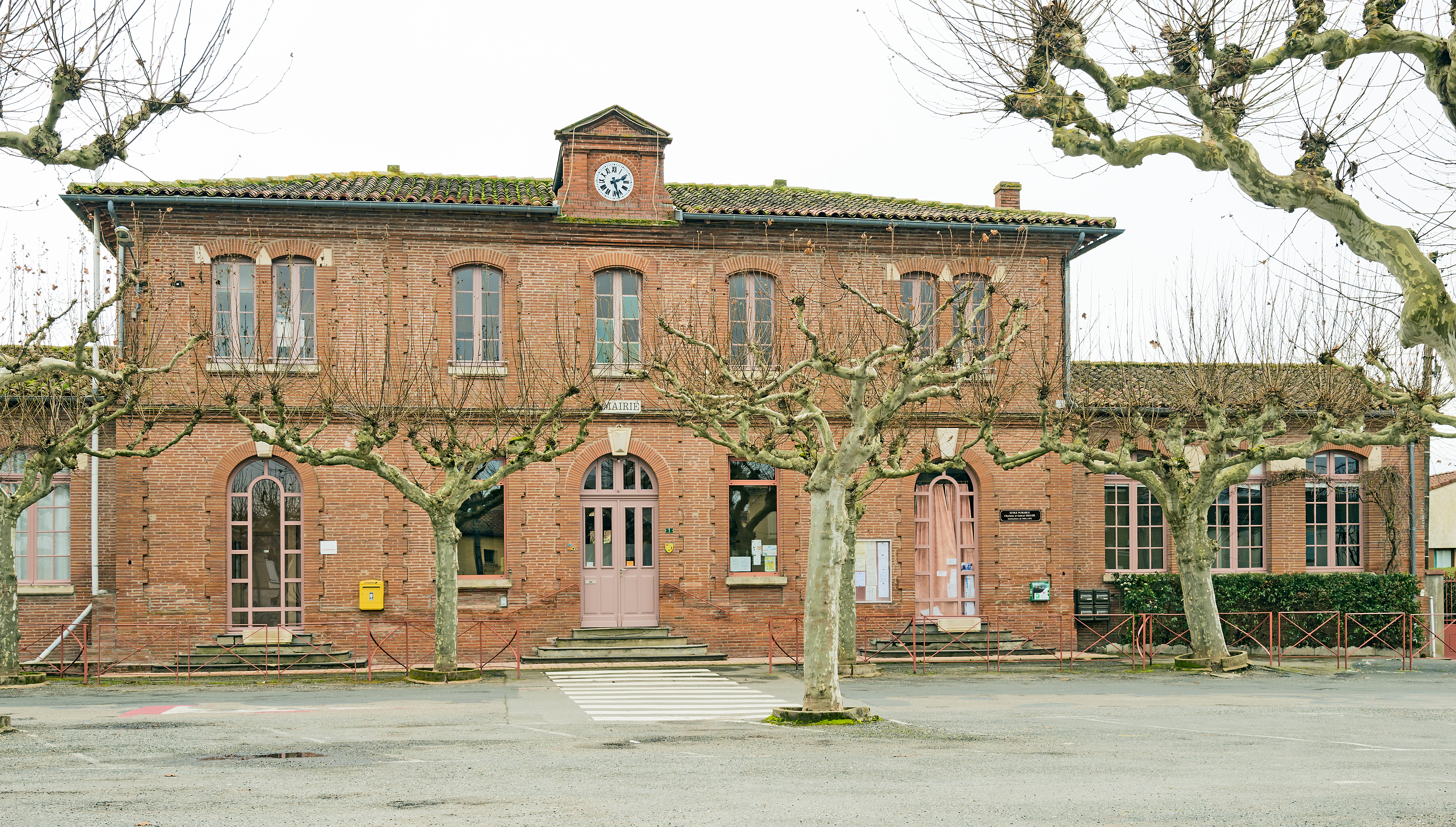
Town hall

== See also ==
- Communes of the Haute-Garonne department
