= Villaudric =

- Commune
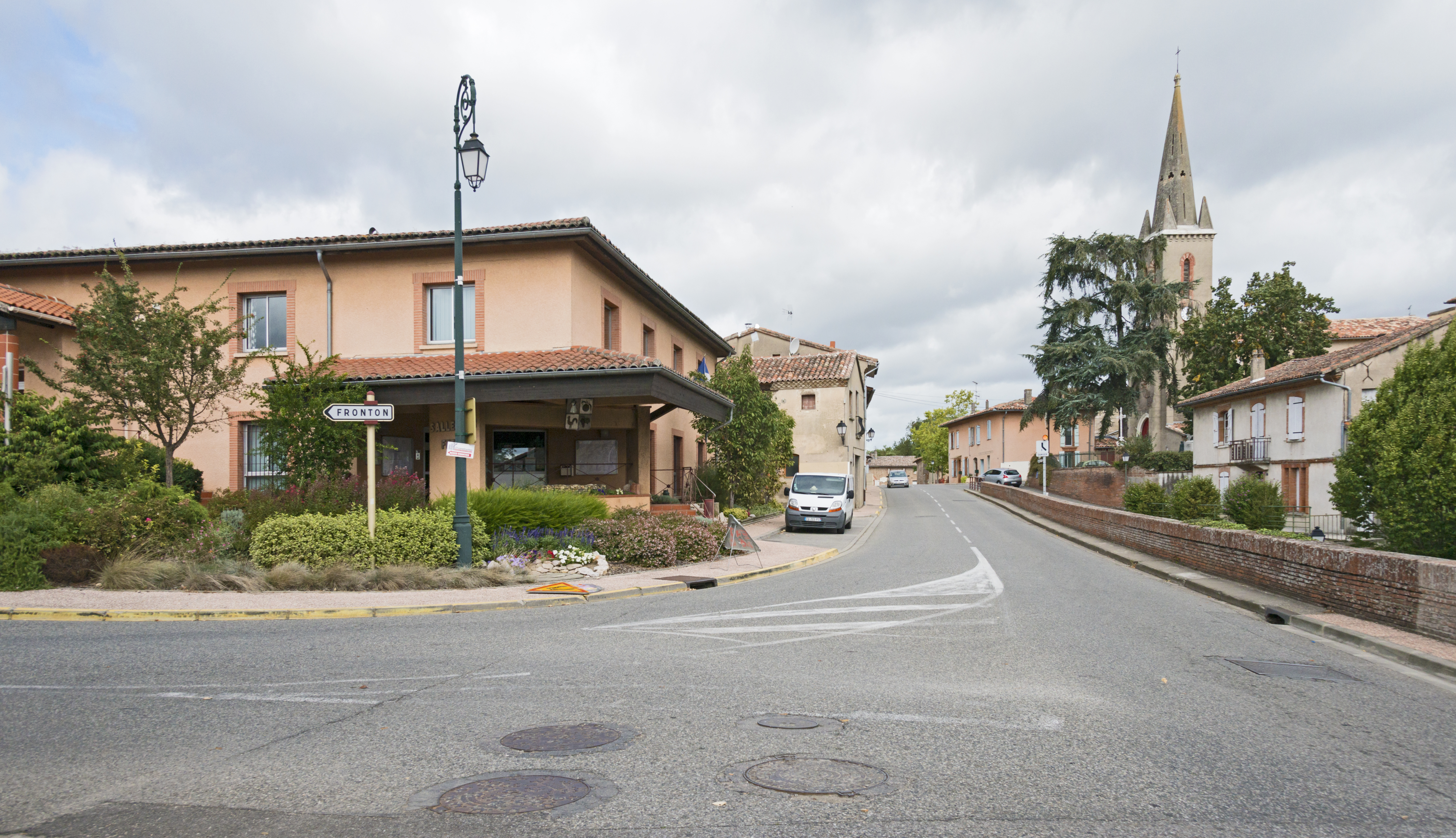
- The town hall and church in Villaudric

- Coat of arms
- Location of Villaudric
- Location within France Location within Occitanie
- Coordinates: 43°49′50″N 1°25′57″E
- Country: France
- Region: Occitania
- Department: Haute-Garonne
- Arrondissement: Toulouse
- Canton: Villemur-sur-Tarn

Government
  - Mayor (2020–2026): Philippe Provendier
- Area^{1}: 12.16 km^{2} (4.70 sq mi)
- Elevation: 142 m (466 ft)
- Highest elevation: 156 m (512 ft)
- Lowest elevation: 112 m (367 ft)
- Population (2023): 1,653
  - Density: 135.9/km^{2} (352.1/sq mi)
- Time zone: UTC+01:00 (CET)
  - Summer (DST): UTC+02:00 (CEST)
- INSEE/Postal code: 31581 /31620
- ^{1} French Land Register data, which excludes lakes, ponds, glaciers > 1 km^{2} (0.386 sq mi or 247 acres) and river estuaries.

Villaudric (French pronunciation: [vilodʁik]; Languedocien: Vilaudric) is a commune in the Haute-Garonne department in southwestern France.

== Population ==
Historical population
Year	Pop.	±% p.a.
1968	537	—
1975	636	+2.45%
1982	722	+1.83%
1990	978	+3.87%
1999	1,115	+1.47%
2007	1,365	+2.56%
2012	1,404	+0.57%
2017	1,545	+1.93%
2023	1,653	+1.13%
Source: INSEE

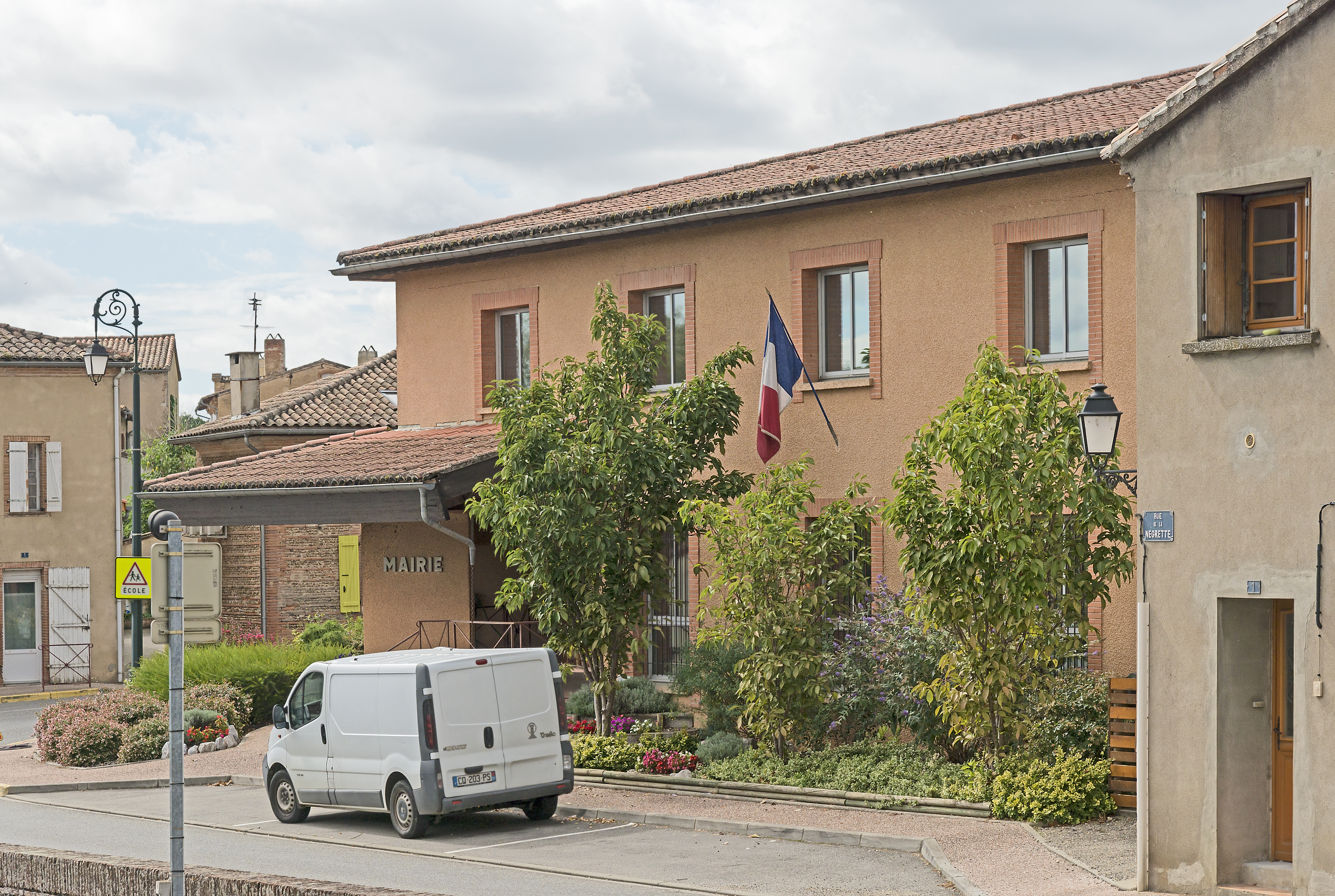
Town Hall

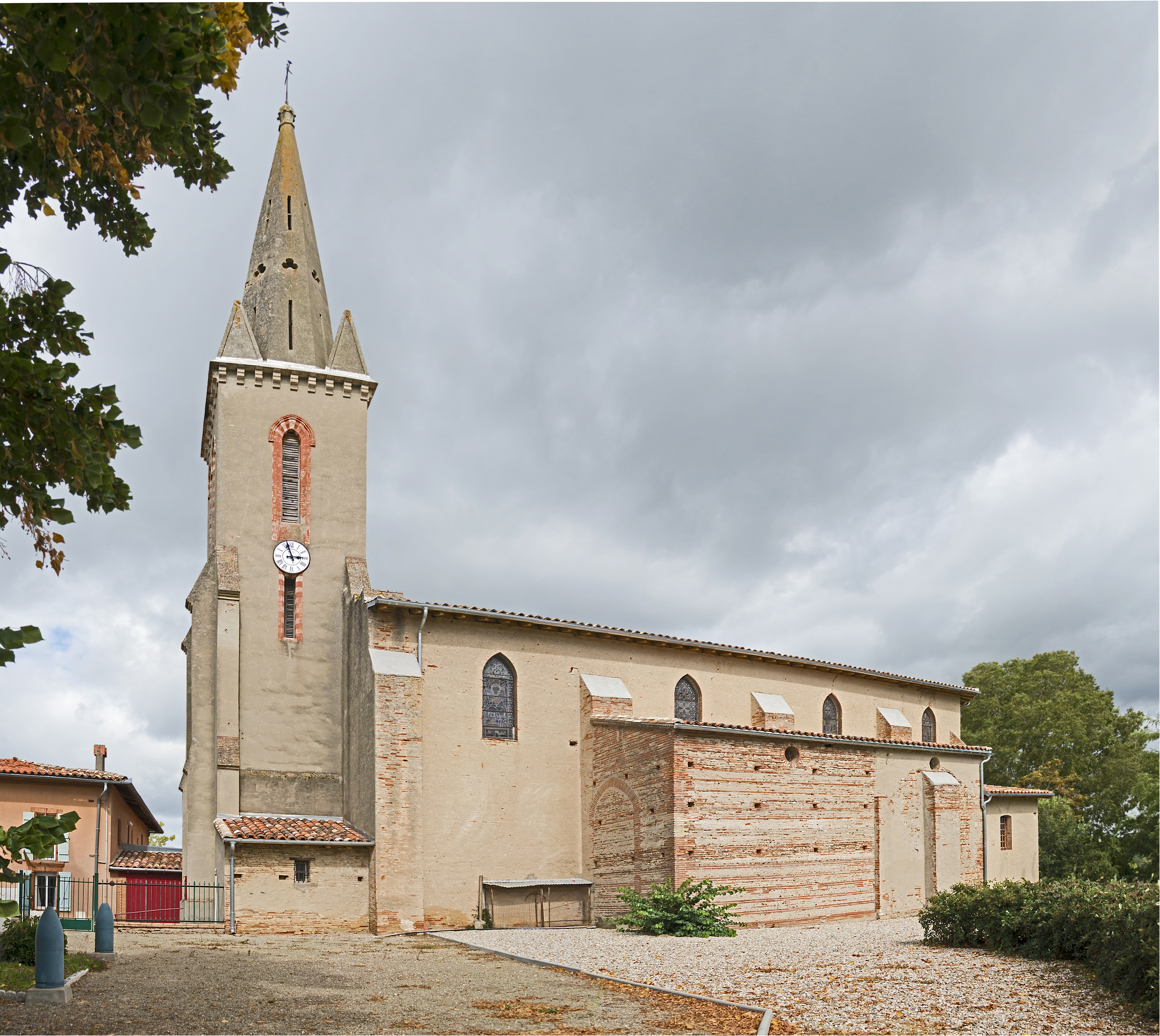
The church

== See also ==
- Communes of the Haute-Garonne department
