= Bouloc, Haute-Garonne =

Bouloc
- Commune
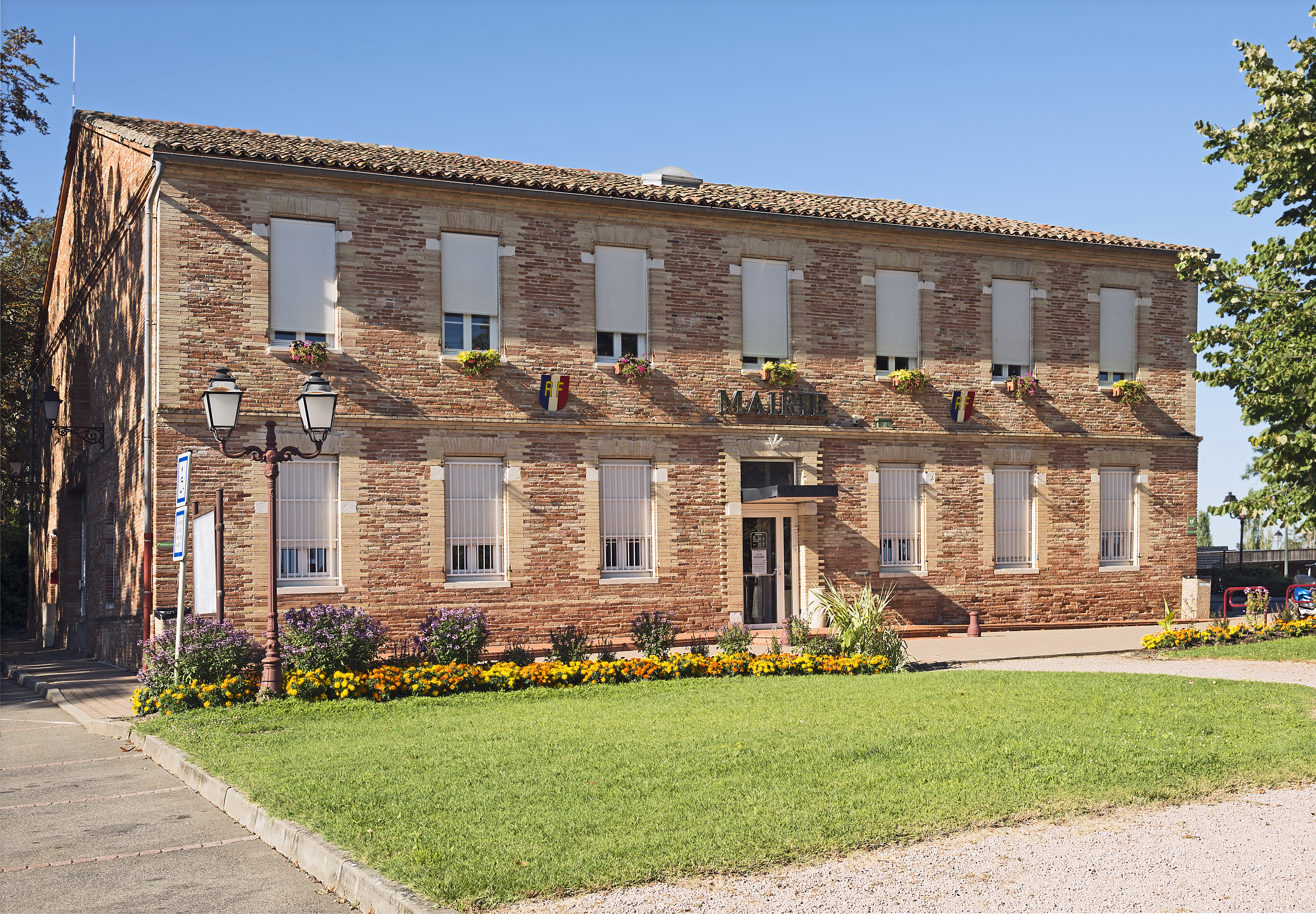
- The town hall

- Coat of arms
- Location of Bouloc
- Location within France Location within Occitanie
- Coordinates: 43°46′53″N 1°24′21″E
- Country: France
- Region: Occitania
- Department: Haute-Garonne
- Arrondissement: Toulouse
- Canton: Villemur-sur-Tarn

Government
  - Mayor (2020–2026): Serge Terrancle
- Area^{1}: 18.55 km^{2} (7.16 sq mi)
- Elevation: 196 m (643 ft)
- Highest elevation: 226 m (741 ft)
- Lowest elevation: 127 m (417 ft)
- Population (2023): 4,618
  - Density: 248.9/km^{2} (644.8/sq mi)
- Time zone: UTC+01:00 (CET)
  - Summer (DST): UTC+02:00 (CEST)
- INSEE/Postal code: 31079 /31620
- ^{1} French Land Register data, which excludes lakes, ponds, glaciers > 1 km^{2} (0.386 sq mi or 247 acres) and river estuaries.

Bouloc (French pronunciation: [bulɔk]; Languedocien: Bonlòc) is a commune in the Haute-Garonne department in southwestern France.

== Population ==
Historical population
Year	Pop.	±% p.a.
1968	770	—
1975	1,084	+5.01%
1982	1,925	+8.55%
1990	2,257	+2.01%
1999	2,925	+2.92%
2007	3,836	+3.45%
2012	4,154	+1.61%
2017	4,659	+2.32%
2023	4,618	−0.15%
Source: INSEE

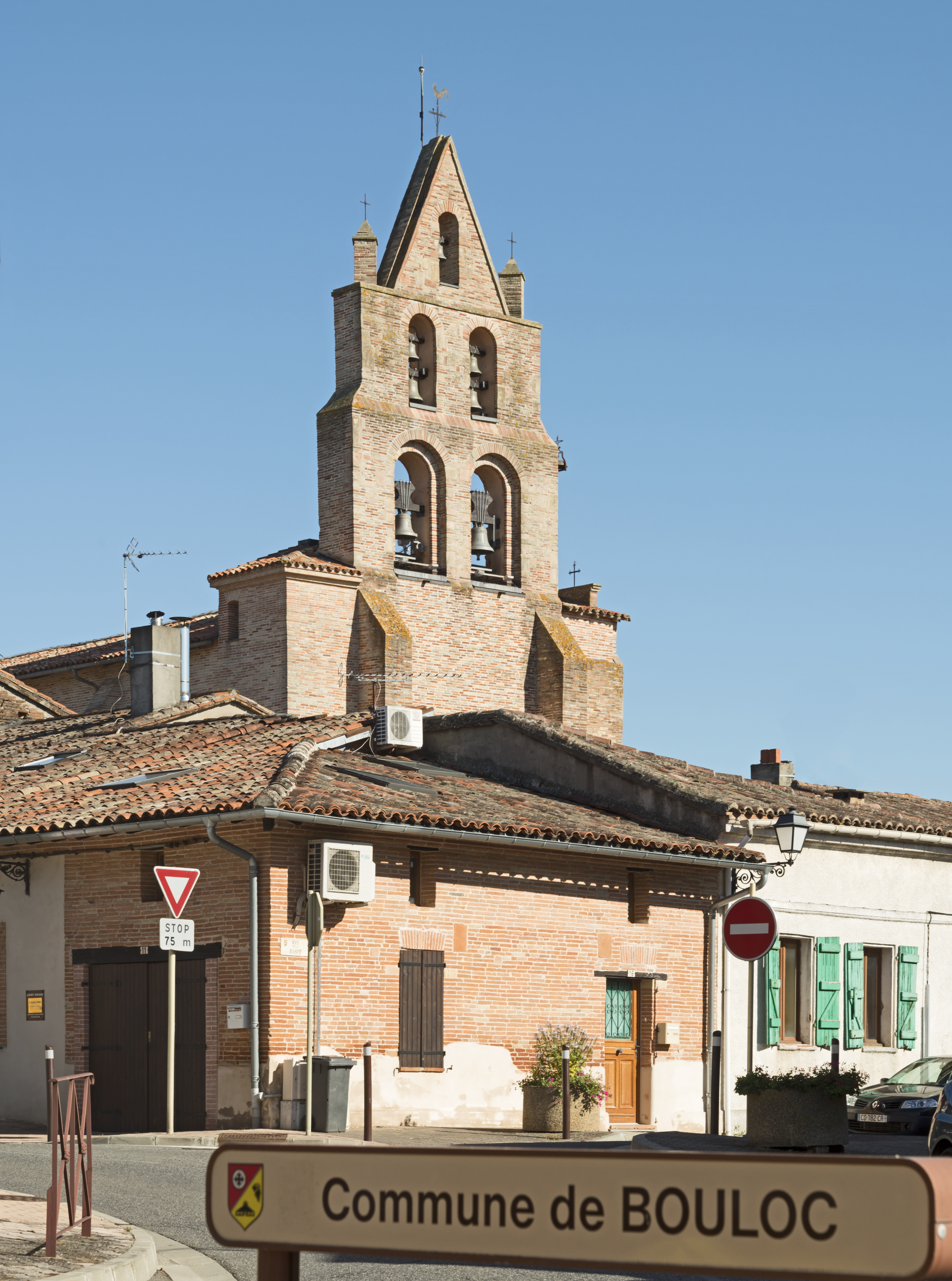
The bell-gable of the church of Notre Dame

== Church "Notre Dame" ==
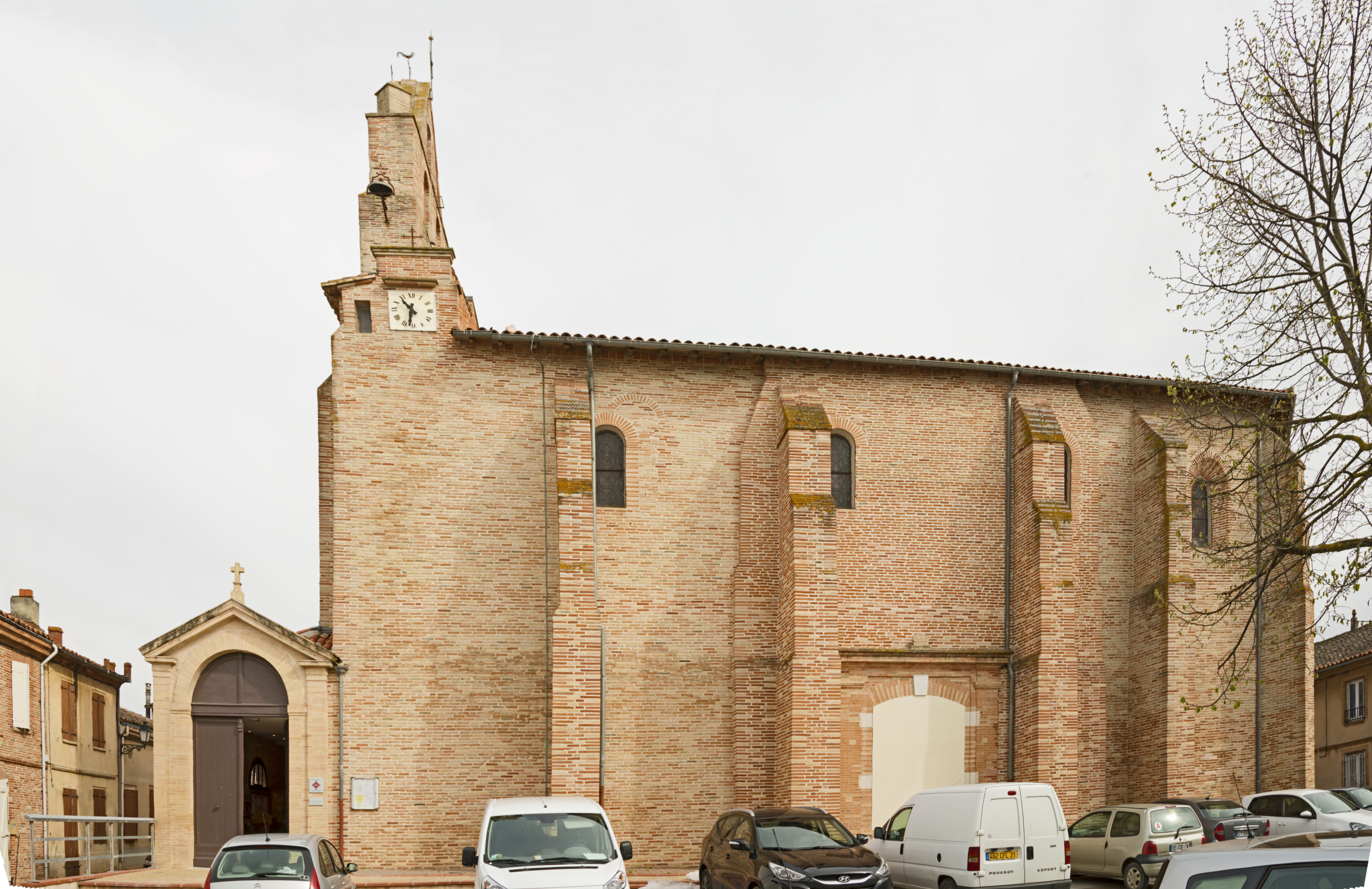

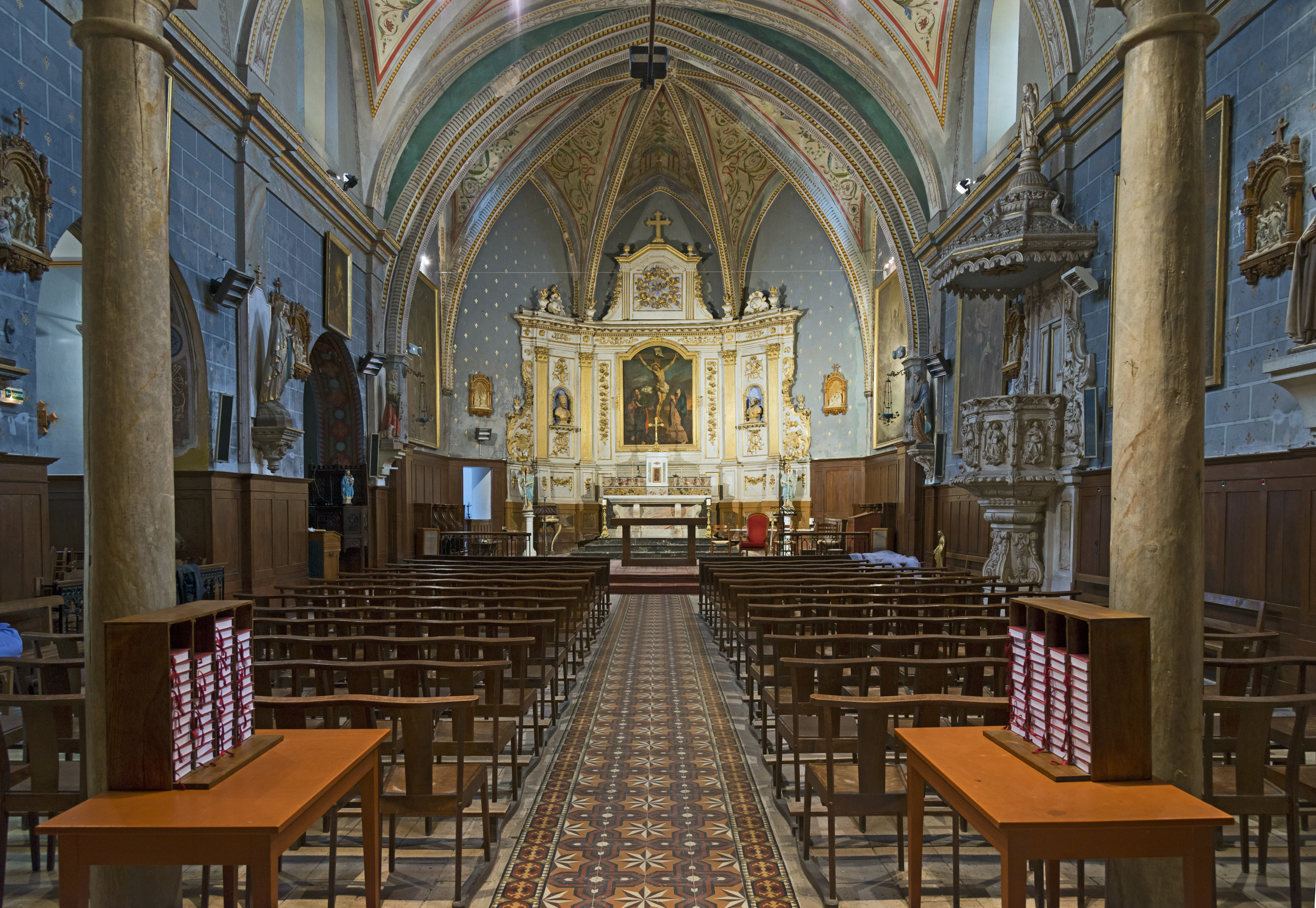

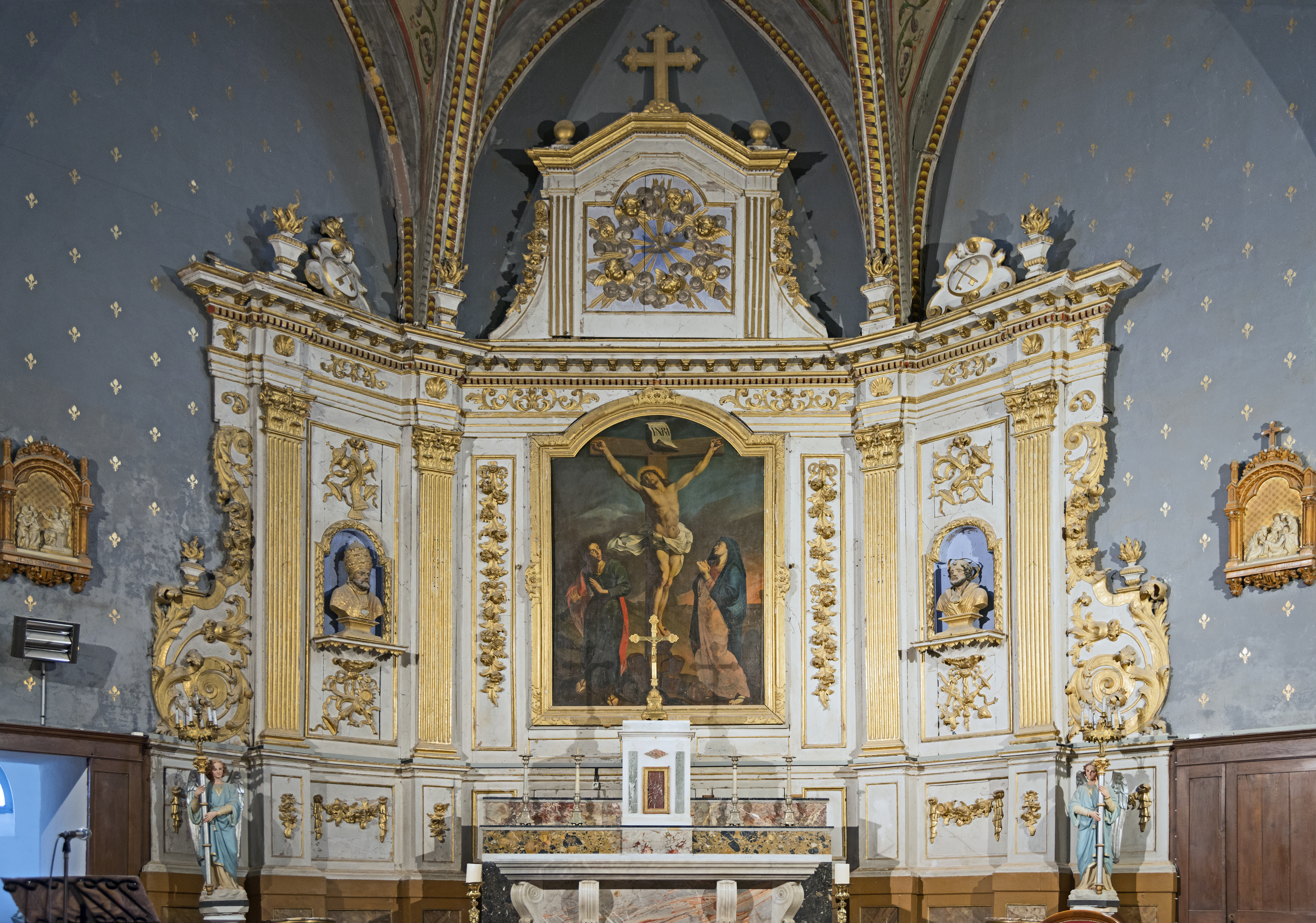

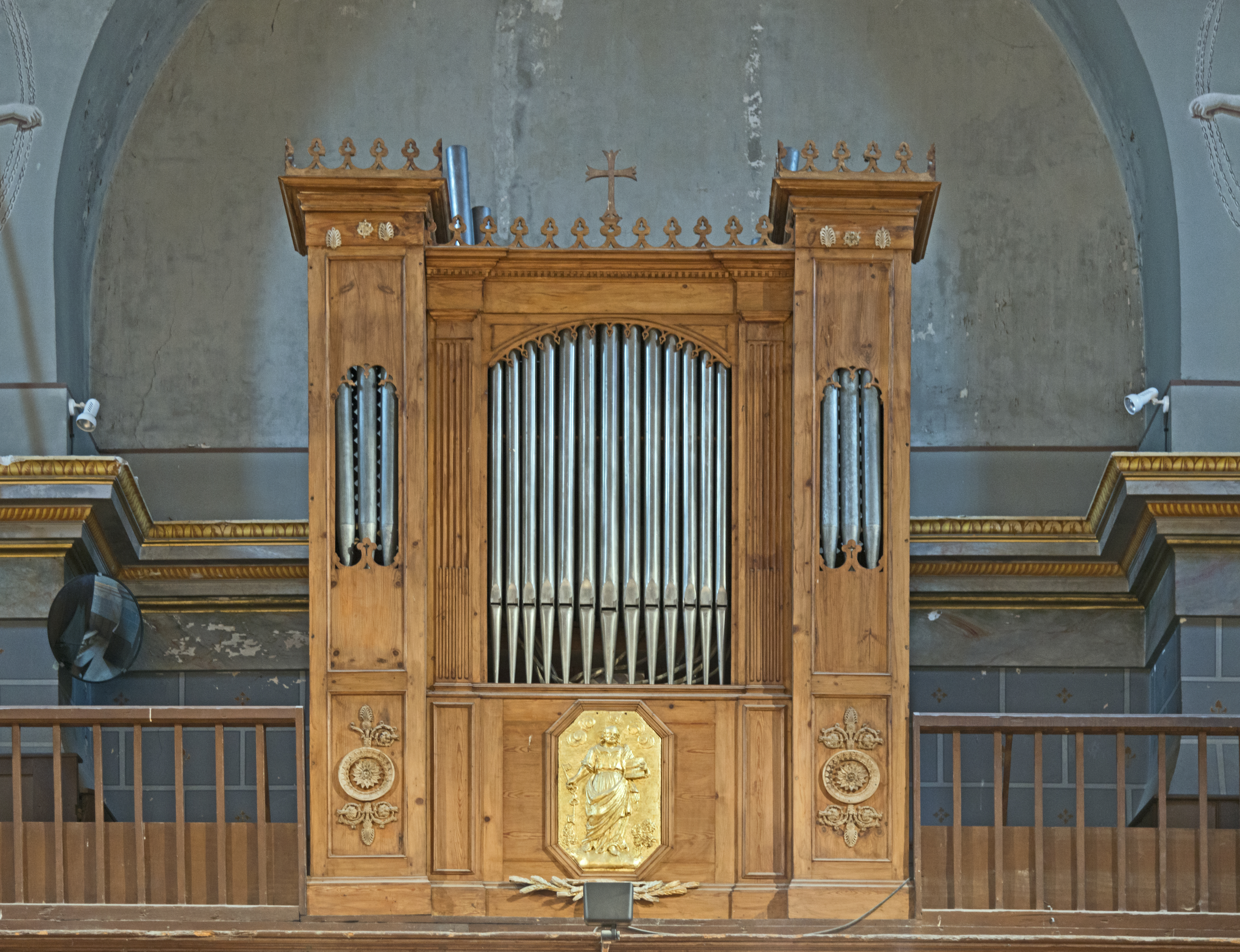

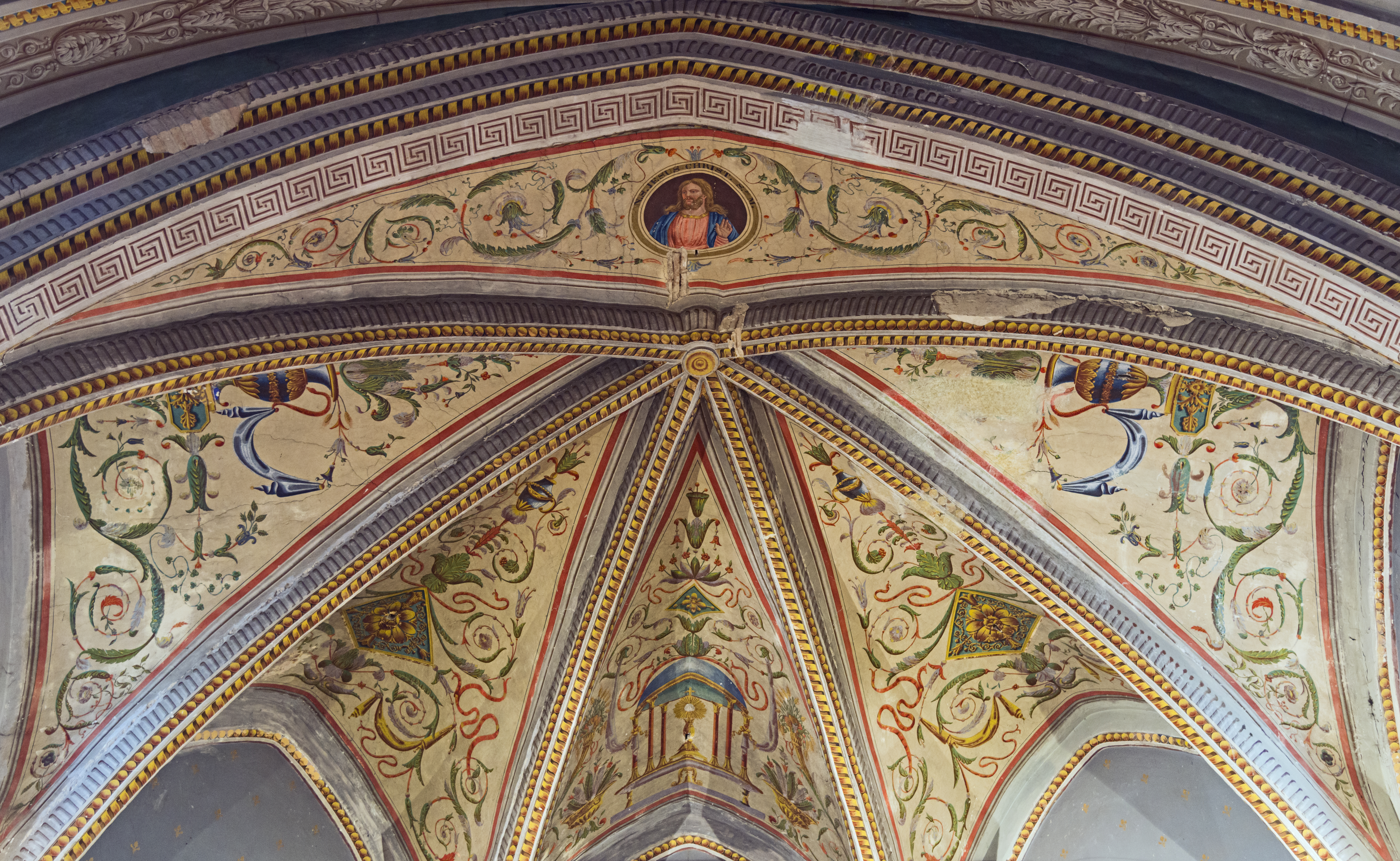

== See also ==
- Communes of the Haute-Garonne department
