= Le Born, Haute-Garonne =

Le Born
- Commune
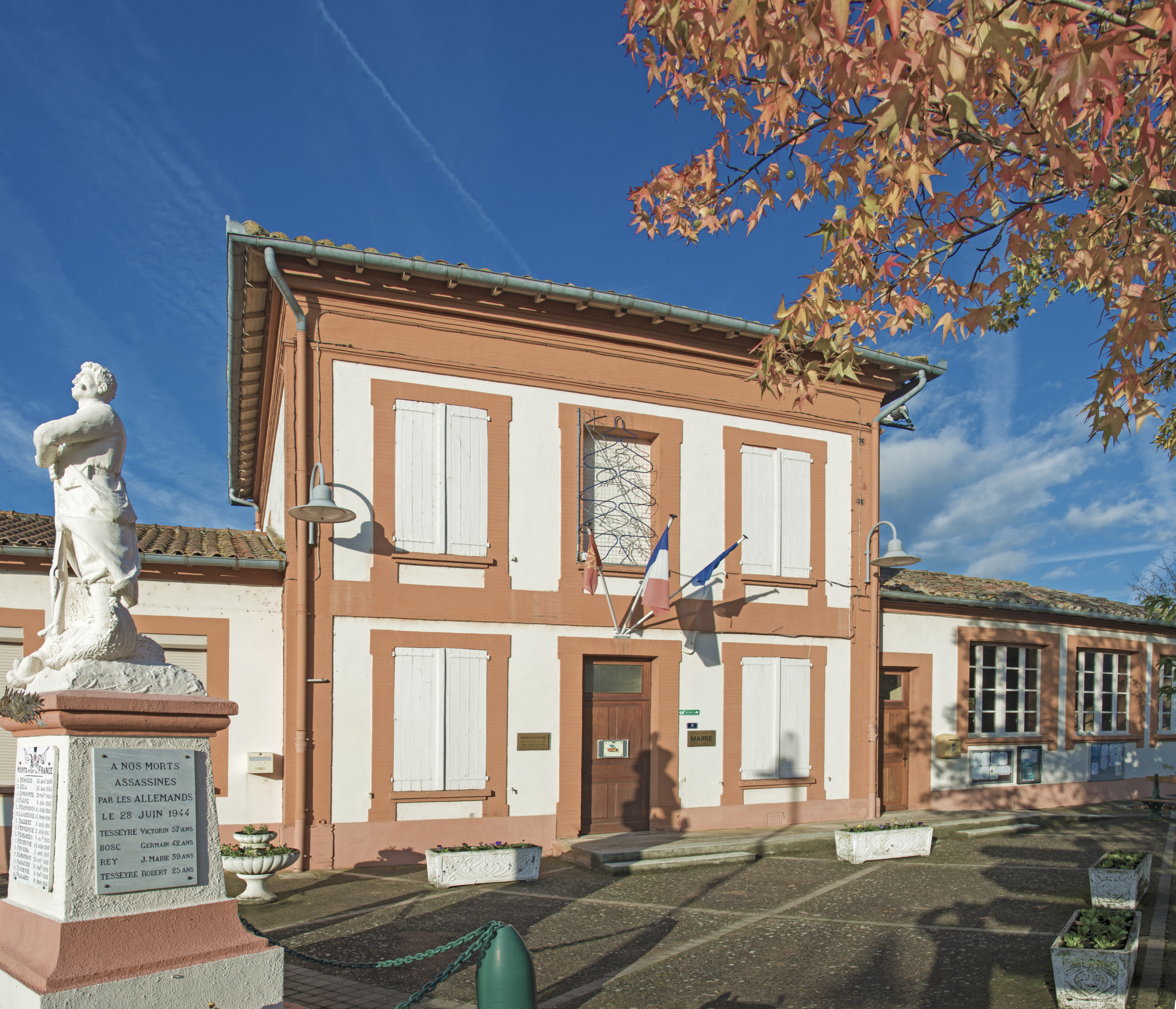
- Town hall

- Coat of arms
- Location of Le Born
- Location within France Location within Occitanie
- Coordinates: 43°53′09″N 1°32′43″E
- Country: France
- Region: Occitania
- Department: Haute-Garonne
- Arrondissement: Toulouse
- Canton: Villemur-sur-Tarn
- Intercommunality: Val'Aïgo

Government
  - Mayor (2020–2026): Robert Sabatier
- Area^{1}: 10.85 km^{2} (4.19 sq mi)
- Elevation: 314 m (1,030 ft)
- Highest elevation: 215 m (705 ft)
- Lowest elevation: 120 m (390 ft)
- Population (2023): 652
  - Density: 60.1/km^{2} (156/sq mi)
- Time zone: UTC+01:00 (CET)
  - Summer (DST): UTC+02:00 (CEST)
- INSEE/Postal code: 31077 /31340
- ^{1} French Land Register data, which excludes lakes, ponds, glaciers > 1 km^{2} (0.386 sq mi or 247 acres) and river estuaries.

Le Born (French pronunciation: [lə bɔʁn]; Occitan: Lo Bòrn) is a commune of the Haute-Garonne department in southwestern France.

== Population ==
Historical population
Year	Pop.	±% p.a.
1968	186	—
1975	194	+0.60%
1982	266	+4.61%
1990	303	+1.64%
1999	261	−1.64%
2007	359	+4.07%
2012	469	+5.49%
2017	548	+3.16%
2023	652	+2.94%
Source: INSEE

== See also ==
- Communes of the Haute-Garonne department
