= Vacquiers =

- Commune
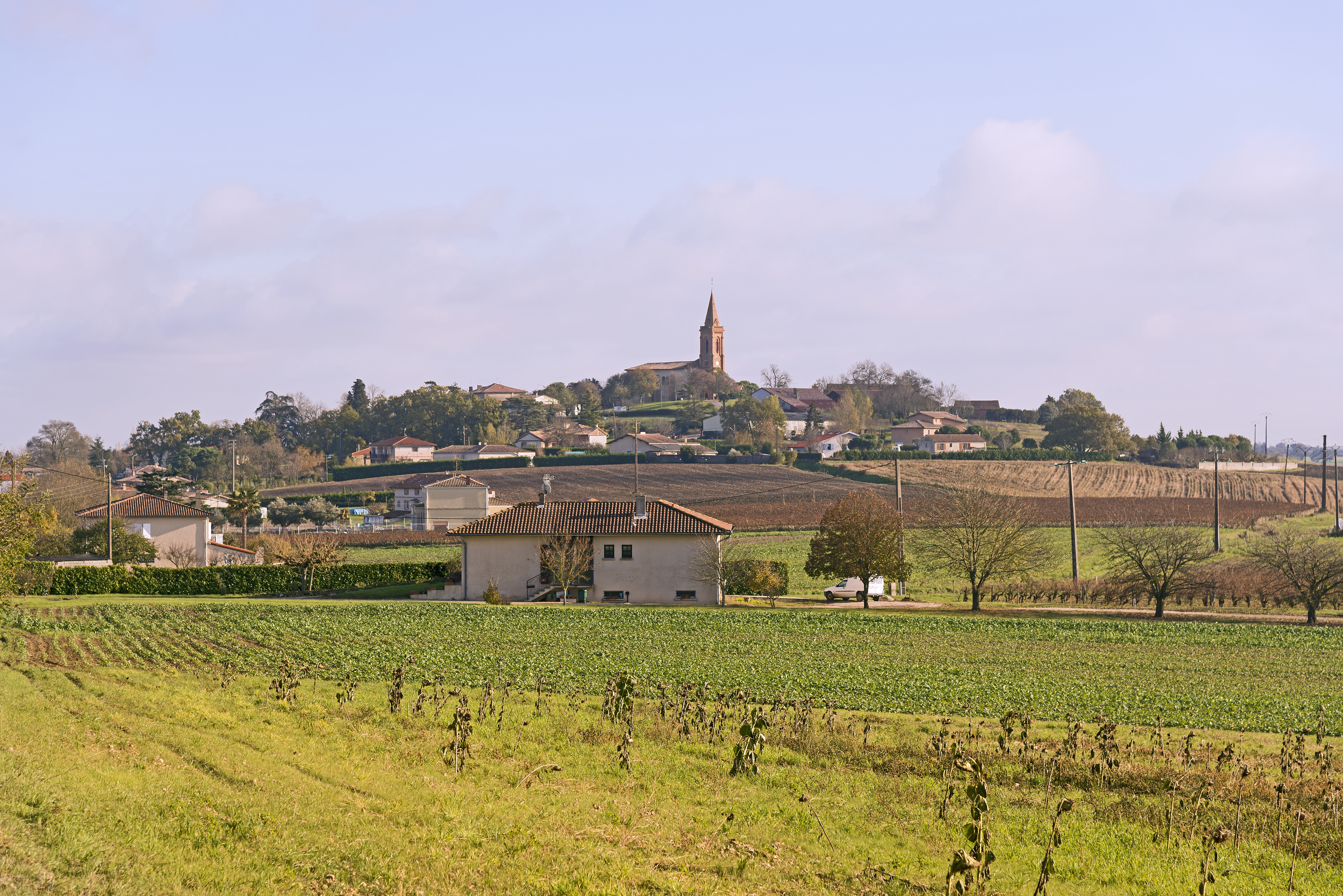
- A general view of Vacquiers

- Coat of arms
- Location of Vacquiers
- Location within France Location within Occitanie
- Coordinates: 43°46′46″N 1°28′50″E
- Country: France
- Region: Occitania
- Department: Haute-Garonne
- Arrondissement: Toulouse
- Canton: Villemur-sur-Tarn

Government
  - Mayor (2020–2026): Virginie Clavel
- Area^{1}: 19.61 km^{2} (7.57 sq mi)
- Elevation: 200 m (660 ft)
- Highest elevation: 225 m (738 ft)
- Lowest elevation: 110 m (360 ft)
- Population (2023): 1,492
  - Density: 76.08/km^{2} (197.1/sq mi)
- Time zone: UTC+01:00 (CET)
  - Summer (DST): UTC+02:00 (CEST)
- INSEE/Postal code: 31563 /31340
- ^{1} French Land Register data, which excludes lakes, ponds, glaciers > 1 km^{2} (0.386 sq mi or 247 acres) and river estuaries.

Vacquiers (French pronunciation: [vakje]; Occitan: Vaquièrs) is a commune in the Haute-Garonne department in southwestern France.

== Population ==
Historical population
Year	Pop.	±% p.a.
1968	475	—
1975	549	+2.09%
1982	736	+4.28%
1990	916	+2.77%
1999	1,032	+1.33%
2007	1,259	+2.52%
2012	1,332	+1.13%
2017	1,307	−0.38%
2023	1,492	+2.23%
Source: INSEE

== Sights ==
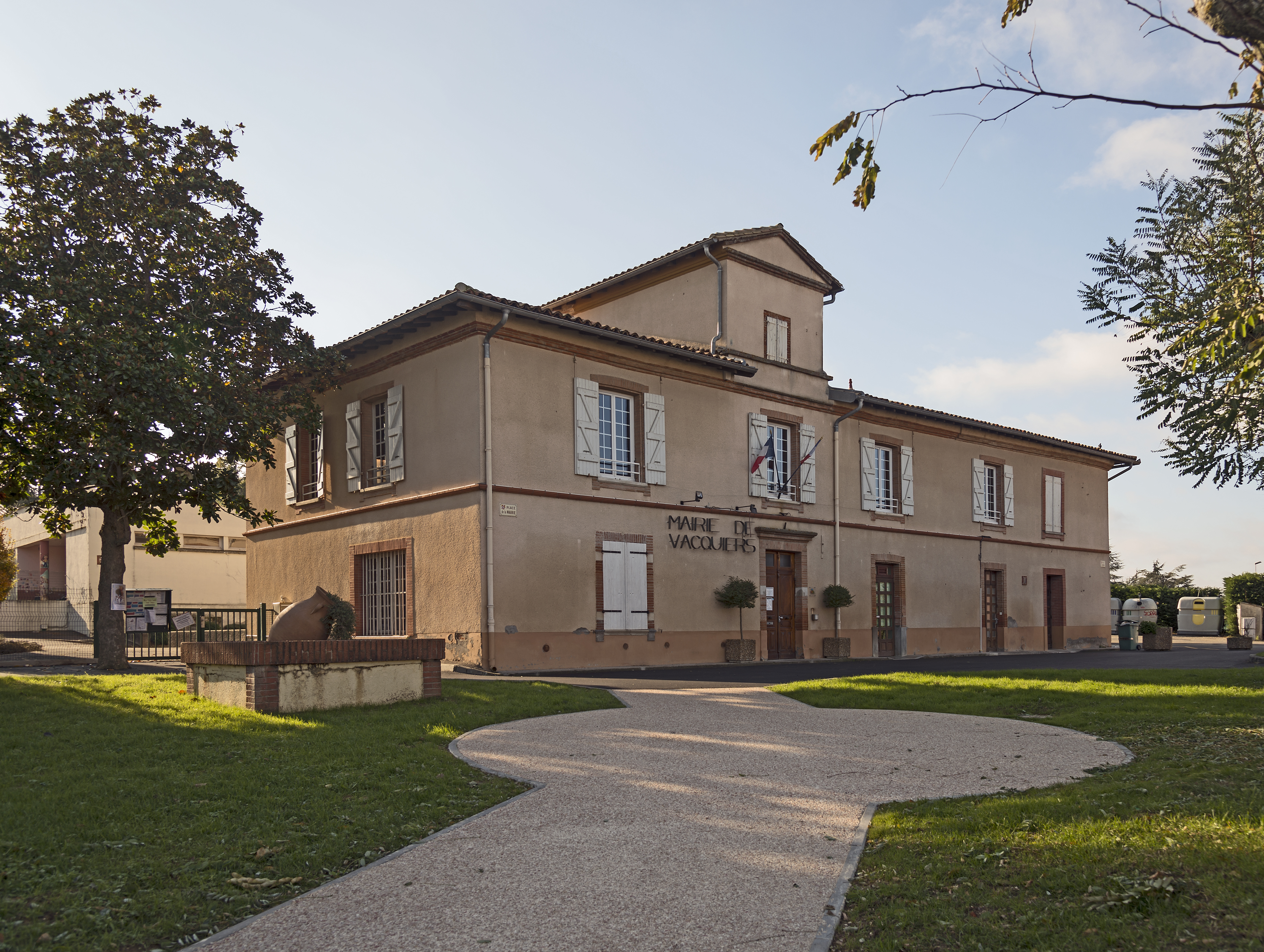
Town Hall

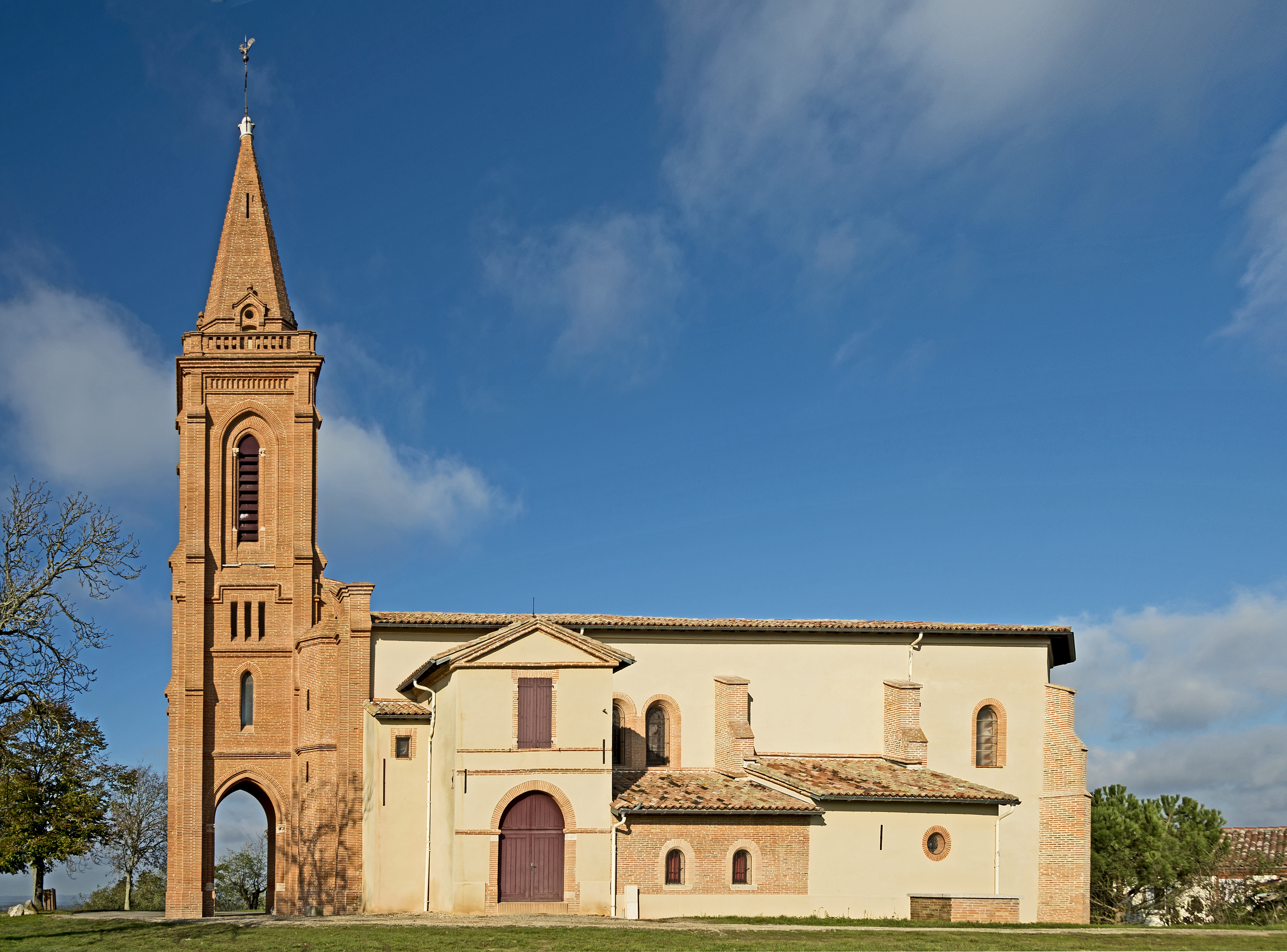
Church

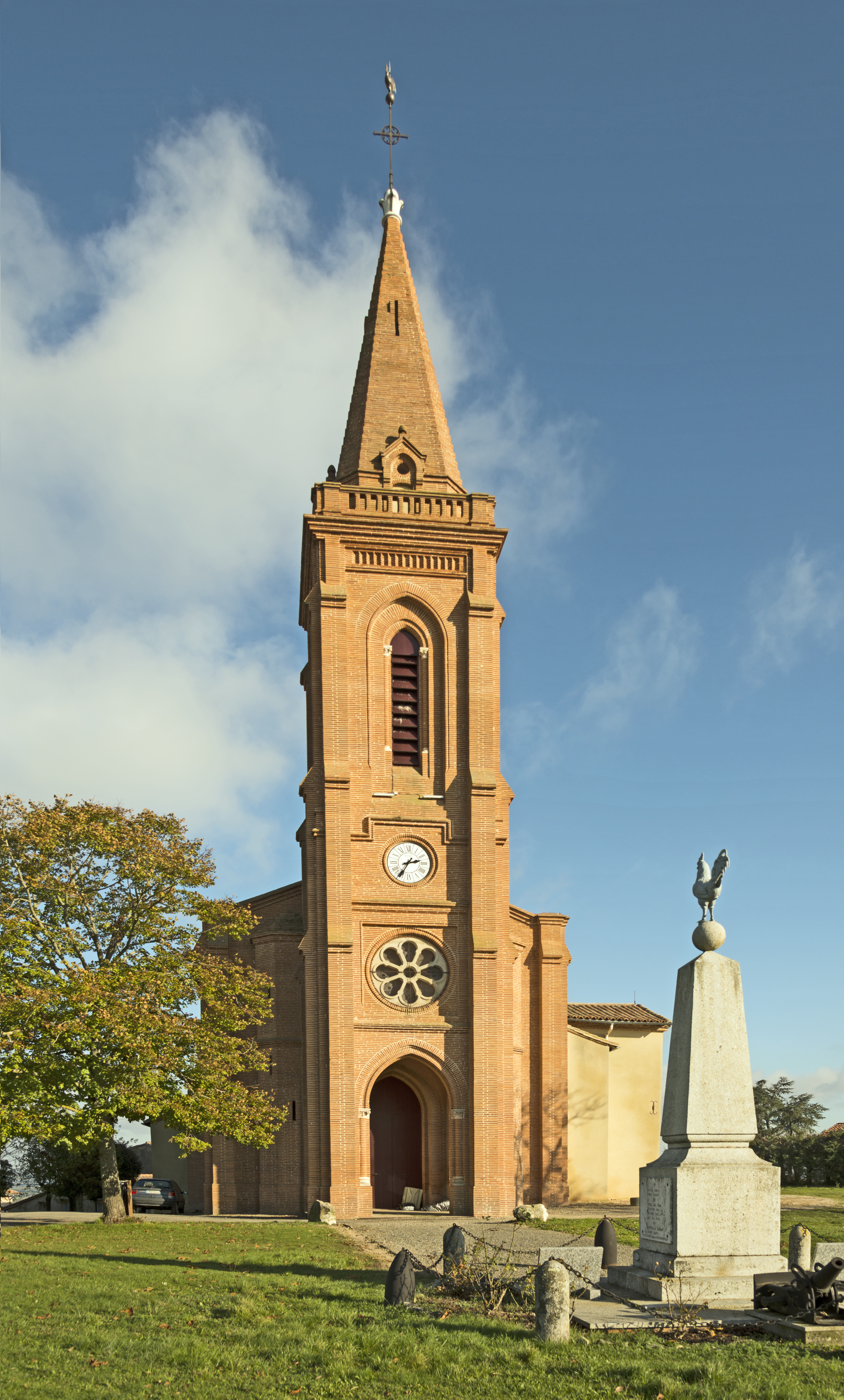
Bell tower and Memorial

== See also ==
- Communes of the Haute-Garonne department
