= Lafitte-Vigordane =

- Commune
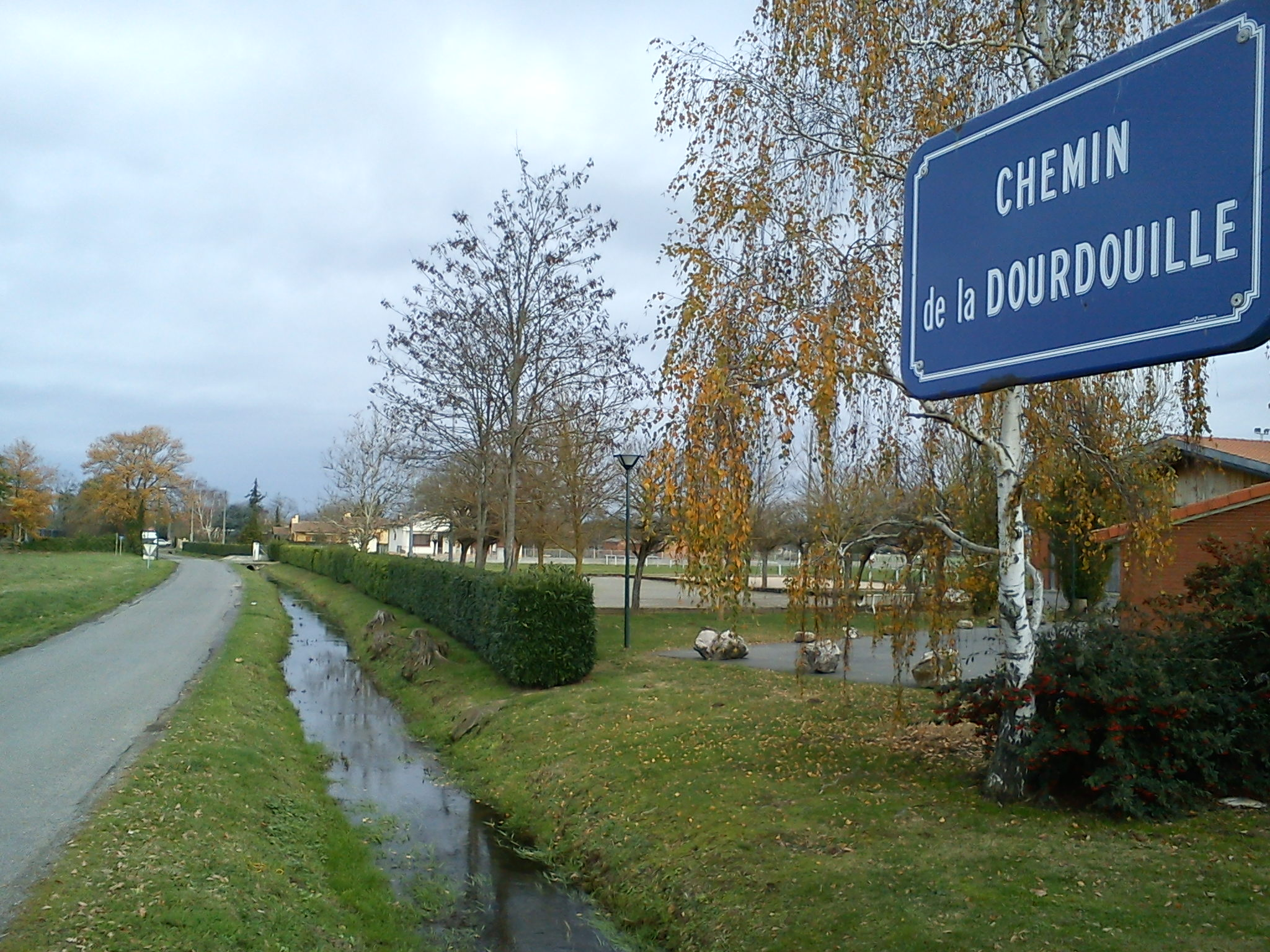
- The Dourdouille in Lafitte-Vigordane
- Location of Lafitte-Vigordane
- Location within France Location within Occitanie
- Coordinates: 43°18′02″N 1°09′50″E
- Country: France
- Region: Occitania
- Department: Haute-Garonne
- Arrondissement: Muret
- Canton: Auterive

Government
  - Mayor (2020–2026): Karine Brun
- Area^{1}: 11.38 km^{2} (4.39 sq mi)
- Elevation: 227 m (745 ft)
- Highest elevation: 236 m (774 ft)
- Lowest elevation: 214 m (702 ft)
- Population (2023): 1,142
  - Density: 100.4/km^{2} (259.9/sq mi)
- Time zone: UTC+01:00 (CET)
  - Summer (DST): UTC+02:00 (CEST)
- INSEE/Postal code: 31261 /31390
- ^{1} French Land Register data, which excludes lakes, ponds, glaciers > 1 km^{2} (0.386 sq mi or 247 acres) and river estuaries.

Lafitte-Vigordane (French pronunciation: [lafit viɡɔʁdan]; Occitan: La Hita Bigordana) is a commune in the Haute-Garonne department in southwestern France.

== Geography ==
The commune is bordered by six other communes: Peyssies to the north, Gratens across the river Louge to the northwest, Marignac-Lasclares across the river Louge to the west, Saint-Élix-le-Château to the southwest, Salles-sur-Garonne to the south, and finally by Carbonne to the east.

The river Louge flows through the commune, forming a border between Gratens and Marignac-Lasclares.

== Population ==
Historical population
Year	Pop.	±% p.a.
1968	426	—
1975	470	+1.41%
1982	456	−0.43%
1990	529	+1.87%
1999	654	+2.38%
2007	1,070	+6.35%
2012	1,072	+0.04%
2017	1,188	+2.08%
2023	1,142	−0.66%
Source: INSEE

== See also ==
Communes of the Haute-Garonne department
