= Bois-de-la-Pierre =

- Commune
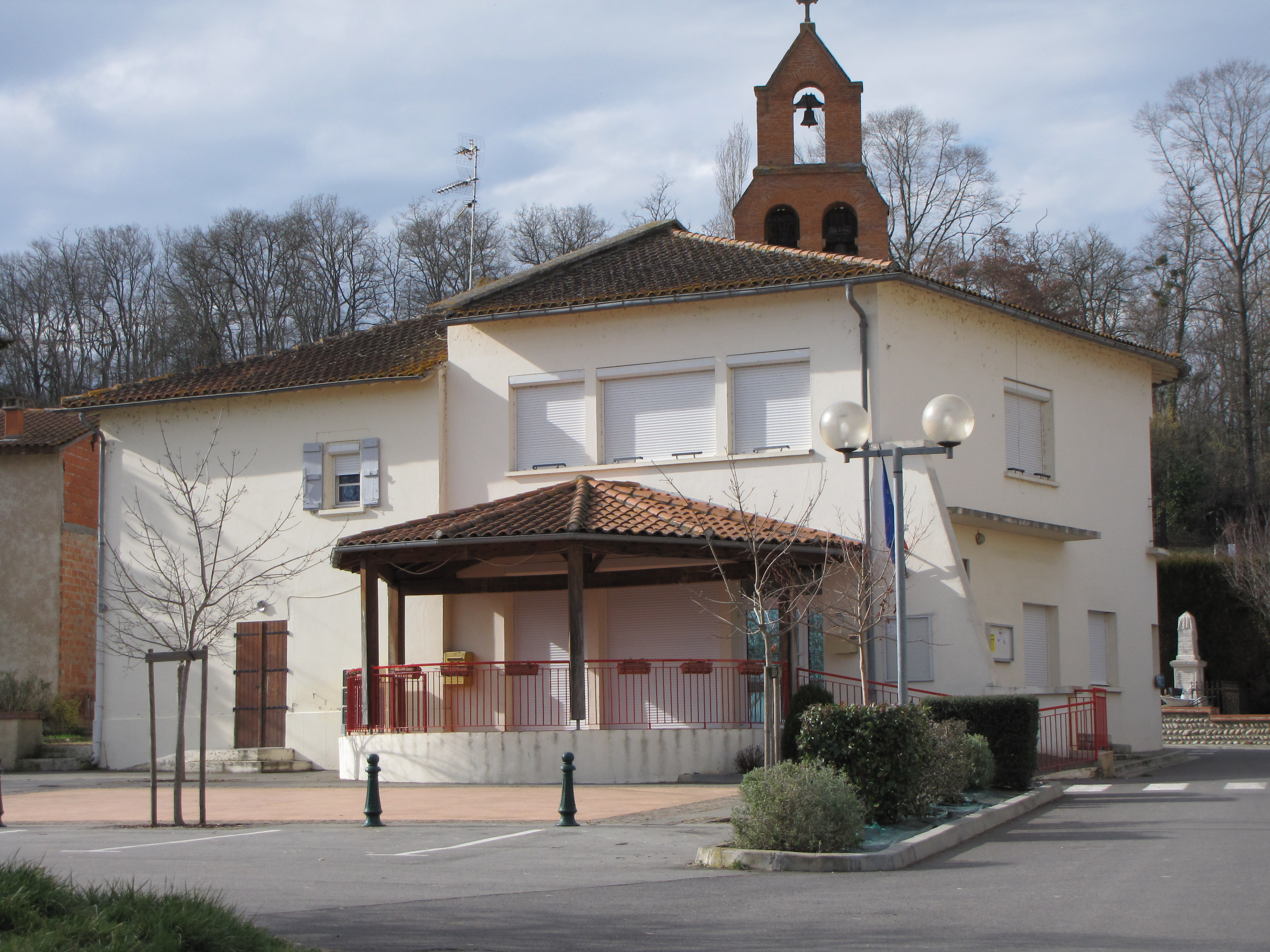
- Town hall

- Coat of arms
- Location of Bois-de-la-Pierre
- Location within France Location within Occitanie
- Coordinates: 43°20′42″N 1°09′06″E
- Country: France
- Region: Occitania
- Department: Haute-Garonne
- Arrondissement: Muret
- Canton: Auterive
- Intercommunality: Volvestre

Government
  - Mayor (2020–2026): Stéphane Wawrzyniak
- Area^{1}: 7.42 km^{2} (2.86 sq mi)
- Elevation: 232 m (761 ft)
- Highest elevation: 266 m (873 ft)
- Lowest elevation: 216 m (709 ft)
- Population (2023): 470
  - Density: 63/km^{2} (160/sq mi)
- Time zone: UTC+01:00 (CET)
  - Summer (DST): UTC+02:00 (CEST)
- INSEE/Postal code: 31071 /31390
- ^{1} French Land Register data, which excludes lakes, ponds, glaciers > 1 km^{2} (0.386 sq mi or 247 acres) and river estuaries.

Bois-de-la-Pierre (French pronunciation: [bwa də la pjɛʁ]; Occitan: Bòsc de la Pèira) is a commune in the Haute-Garonne department in southwestern France.

== Geography ==
The commune is bordered by five other communes: Bérat to the north, Longages to the northwest, Peyssies across the river Louge to the southeast, Gratens to the southwest, and finally by Labastide-Clermont to the west.

The river Louge flows through the commune, forming a border with Peyssies.

== Population ==
Historical population
Year	Pop.	±% p.a.
1968	175	—
1975	147	−2.46%
1982	152	+0.48%
1990	219	+4.67%
1999	313	+4.05%
2007	404	+3.24%
2012	420	+0.78%
2017	429	+0.42%
2023	470	+1.53%
Source: INSEE

== See also ==
- Communes of the Haute-Garonne department
