= Le Fousseret =

- Commune
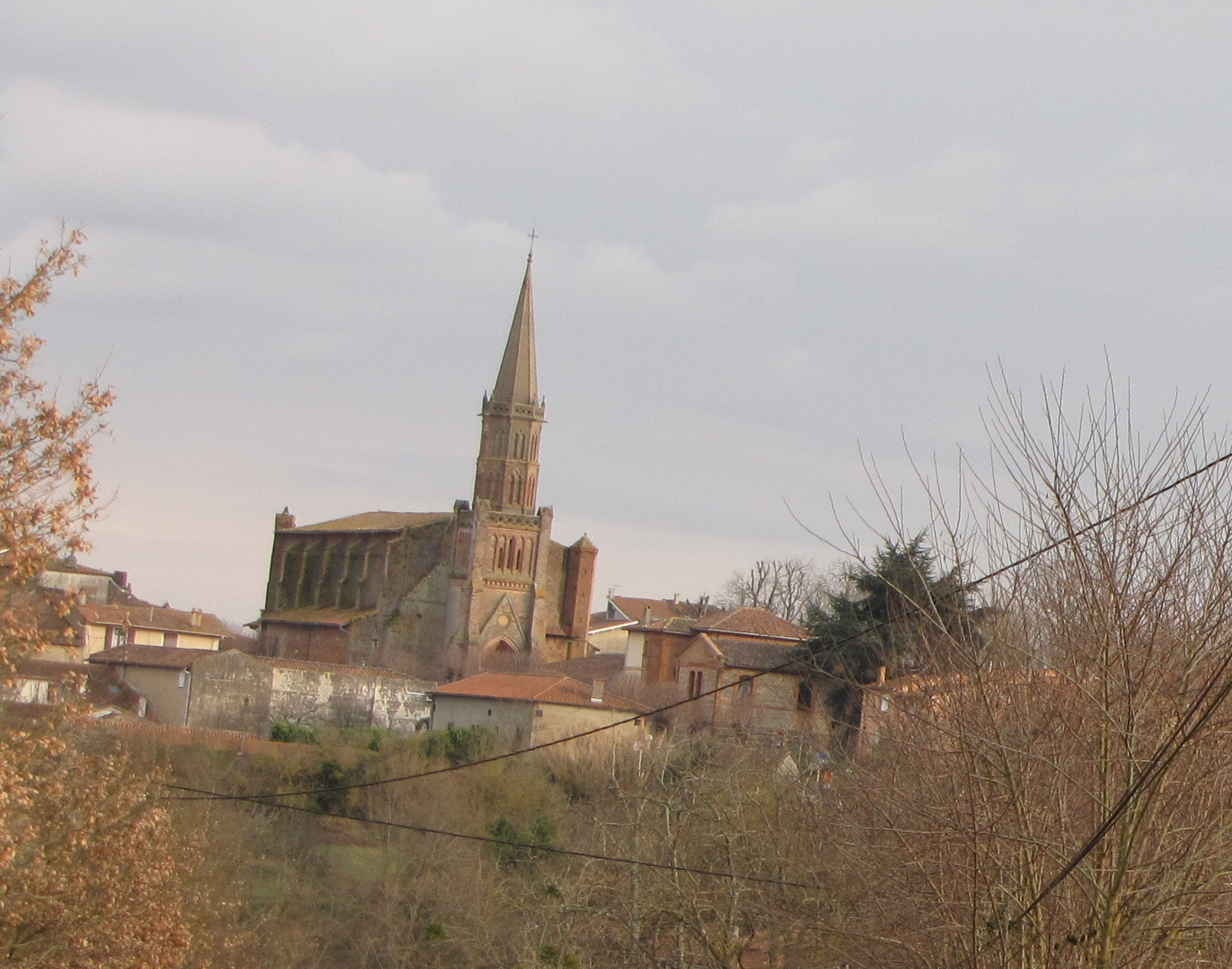
- The church in Le Fousseret

- Coat of arms
- Location of Le Fousseret
- Location within France Location within Occitanie
- Coordinates: 43°16′57″N 1°03′59″E
- Country: France
- Region: Occitania
- Department: Haute-Garonne
- Arrondissement: Muret
- Canton: Cazères

Government
  - Mayor (2021–2026): Pierre Lagarrigue
- Area^{1}: 38.31 km^{2} (14.79 sq mi)
- Elevation: 320 m (1,050 ft)
- Highest elevation: 372 m (1,220 ft)
- Lowest elevation: 238 m (781 ft)
- Population (2023): 1,863
  - Density: 48.63/km^{2} (126.0/sq mi)
- Time zone: UTC+01:00 (CET)
  - Summer (DST): UTC+02:00 (CEST)
- INSEE/Postal code: 31193 /31430
- ^{1} French Land Register data, which excludes lakes, ponds, glaciers > 1 km^{2} (0.386 sq mi or 247 acres) and river estuaries.

Le Fousseret (French pronunciation: [lə fusʁɛ]; Occitan: Le Hosseret) is a commune and a large village in the Haute-Garonne department in southwestern France.

== Geography ==
The village lies in the middle of the commune, on the left bank of the Louge, which flows northeast through the middle of the commune. The border between Le Fousseret and Mondavezan is formed by the river Louge.

The commune is bordered by nine other communes: Pouy-de-Touges to the north, Castelnau-Picampeau to the northwest, Gratens and Marignac-Lasclares to the northeast, Saint-Élix-le-Château to the east, Lavelanet-de-Comminges to the southeast, Cazères to the south, Mondavezan across the river Louge to the southwest, and finally by Montoussin to the west.

== Population ==
Historical population
Year	Pop.	±% p.a.
1968	1,460	—
1975	1,412	−0.48%
1982	1,375	−0.38%
1990	1,370	−0.05%
1999	1,434	+0.51%
2007	1,591	+1.31%
2012	1,796	+2.45%
2017	1,897	+1.10%
2023	1,863	−0.30%
Source: INSEE

The inhabitants of the commune are known as Fousseretois in French.

== International relations ==
Le Fousseret is twinned with:

- La Pobla de Segur, Spain

== See also ==
- Communes of the Haute-Garonne department
