= Marignac-Lasclares =

- Commune
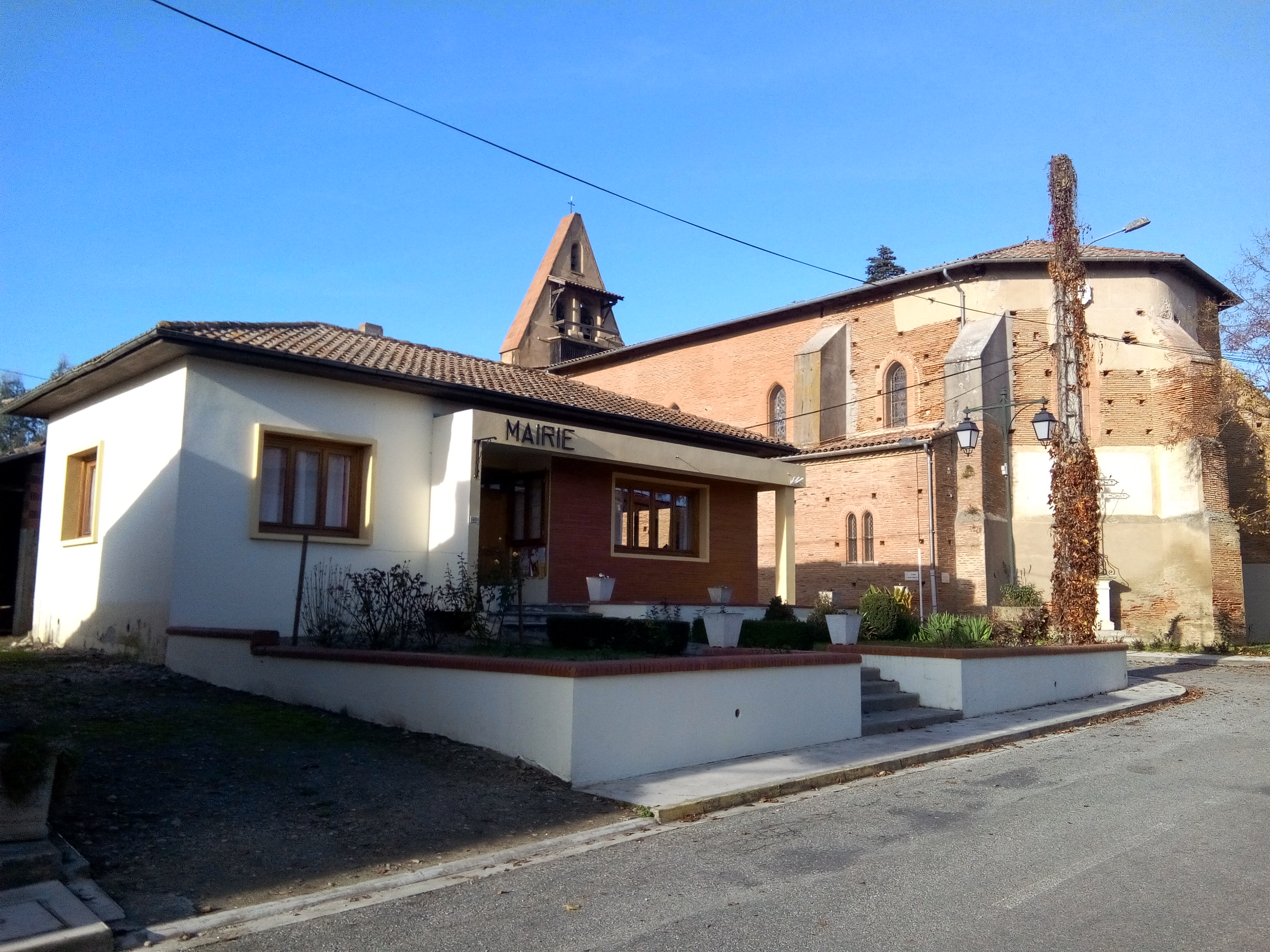
- The town hall and church in Marignac-Lasclares
- Location of Marignac-Lasclares
- Location within France Location within Occitanie
- Coordinates: 43°18′25″N 1°05′57″E
- Country: France
- Region: Occitania
- Department: Haute-Garonne
- Arrondissement: Muret
- Canton: Cazères

Government
  - Mayor (2020–2026): Anicet Agboton
- Area^{1}: 10.01 km^{2} (3.86 sq mi)
- Elevation: 300 m (980 ft)
- Highest elevation: 310 m (1,020 ft)
- Lowest elevation: 231 m (758 ft)
- Population (2023): 479
  - Density: 47.9/km^{2} (124/sq mi)
- Time zone: UTC+01:00 (CET)
  - Summer (DST): UTC+02:00 (CEST)
- INSEE/Postal code: 31317 /31430
- ^{1} French Land Register data, which excludes lakes, ponds, glaciers > 1 km^{2} (0.386 sq mi or 247 acres) and river estuaries.

Marignac-Lasclares (French pronunciation: [maʁiɲak lasklaʁ]; Occitan: Marinhac e las Claras) is a commune in the Haute-Garonne department in southwestern France.

== Geography ==
The commune is bordered by four other communes: Gratens to the north, Le Fousseret to the west and southwest, Lafitte-Vigordane across the river Louge to the east, and finally by Saint-Élix-le-Château across the river Louge to the southeast.

The river Louge flows in the commune, forms a border between Lafitte-Vigordane and Saint-Élix-le-Château.

== Population ==
Historical population
| Year | Pop. | ±% p.a. |
|---|---|---|
| 1968 | 235 | — |
| 1975 | 209 | −1.66% |
| 1982 | 240 | +2.00% |
| 1990 | 265 | +1.25% |
| 1999 | 295 | +1.20% |
| 2007 | 332 | +1.49% |
| 2012 | 433 | +5.46% |
| 2017 | 478 | +2.00% |
| 2023 | 479 | +0.03% |
Source: INSEE

== See also ==
- Communes of the Haute-Garonne department
