= Jean-Marc Ferratge =

French footballer (born 1959)

Personal information
- Date of birth: 10 October 1959 (age 67)
- Place of birth: Cazères, France
- Position: Striker

Senior career*
Years	Team	Apps	(Gls)
1977–1980	Bordeaux	53	(3)
1980–1982	Nîmes	58	(19)
1982–1986	Toulouse	124	(20)
1986–1991	Monaco	113	(9)
1991–1992	Bordeaux	21	(4)

International career
1982	France	1	(0)

Managerial career
- 2001–2002: RC Vichy
- 2003–2004: Pau FC
- 2005: AS Auch
- * Club domestic league appearances and goals

Jean-Marc Ferratge (born 10 October 1959 in Cazères) is a retired professional French footballer who played striker.

Born in Cazères, Ferratge began playing professional football with FC Girondins de Bordeaux. He played in Ligue 1 for Bordeaux, Nîmes Olympique, Toulouse FC and AS Monaco FC, winning the league with Monaco in 1988.
