= Goutevernisse =

- Commune
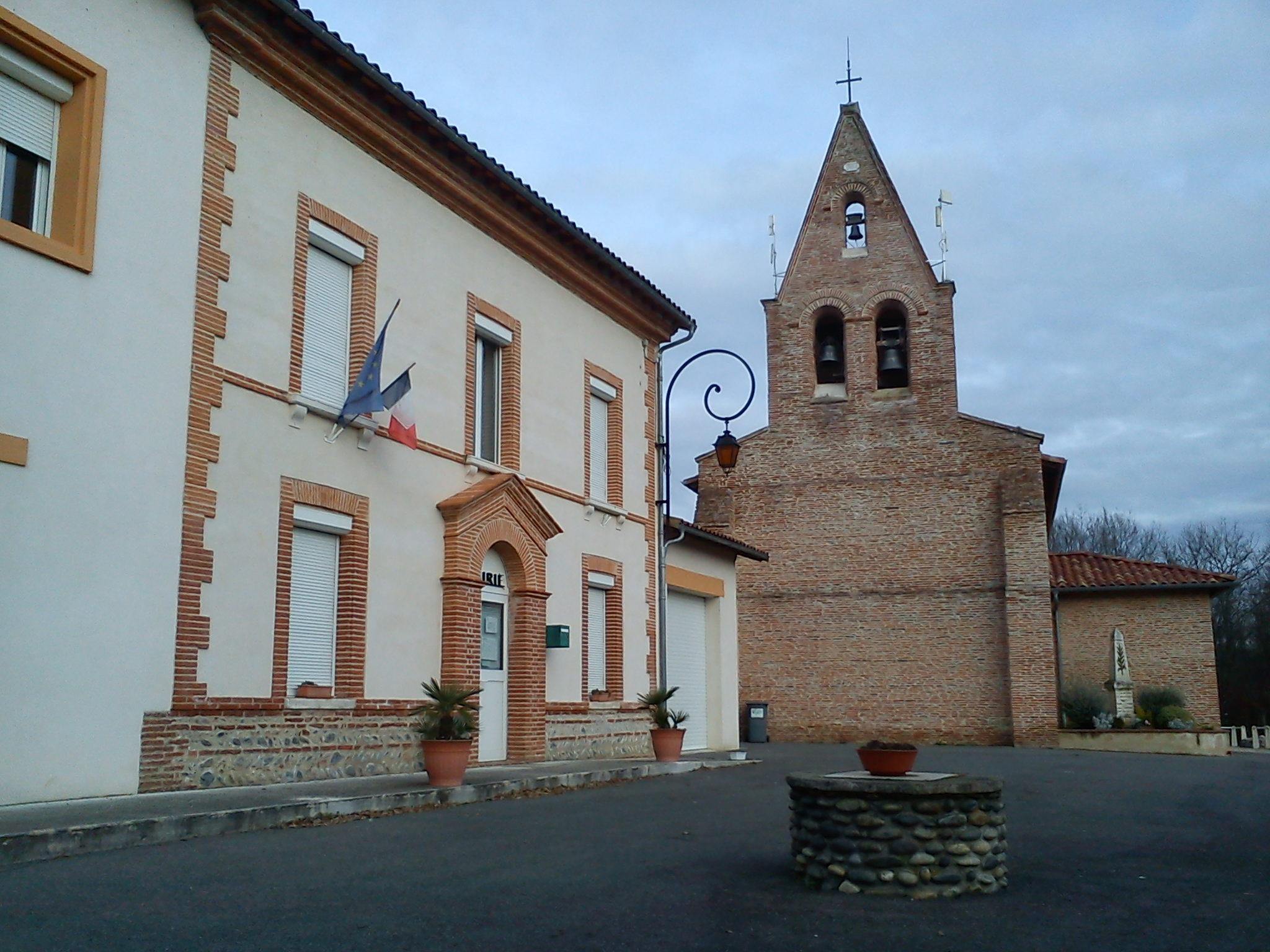
- The town hall and church in Goutevernisse
- Location of Goutevernisse
- Location within France Location within Occitanie
- Coordinates: 43°12′46″N 1°10′17″E
- Country: France
- Region: Occitania
- Department: Haute-Garonne
- Arrondissement: Muret
- Canton: Auterive
- Intercommunality: Volvestre

Government
  - Mayor (2024–2026): Bernard Delcroix
- Area^{1}: 4.69 km^{2} (1.81 sq mi)
- Elevation: 250 m (820 ft)
- Highest elevation: 326 m (1,070 ft)
- Lowest elevation: 223 m (732 ft)
- Population (2023): 185
  - Density: 39.4/km^{2} (102/sq mi)
- Time zone: UTC+01:00 (CET)
  - Summer (DST): UTC+02:00 (CEST)
- INSEE/Postal code: 31225 /31310
- ^{1} French Land Register data, which excludes lakes, ponds, glaciers > 1 km^{2} (0.386 sq mi or 247 acres) and river estuaries.

Goutevernisse (French pronunciation: [ɡutvɛʁnis]; Occitan: Gotavernissa) is a commune in the Haute-Garonne department in southwestern France.

== Geography ==
The commune is bordered by four other communes: Rieux-Volvestre to the north, Montesquieu-Volvestre to the east, Saint-Christaud to the south, and finally by Gensac-sur-Garonne to the west.

== Population ==
Historical population
Year	Pop.	±% p.a.
1968	88	—
1975	82	−1.00%
1982	67	−2.84%
1990	82	+2.56%
1999	77	−0.70%
2007	147	+8.42%
2012	167	+2.58%
2017	187	+2.29%
2023	185	−0.18%
Source: INSEE

== See also ==
- Communes of the Haute-Garonne department
