= Cazères =

Cazères Casèras (Occitan)
- Commune
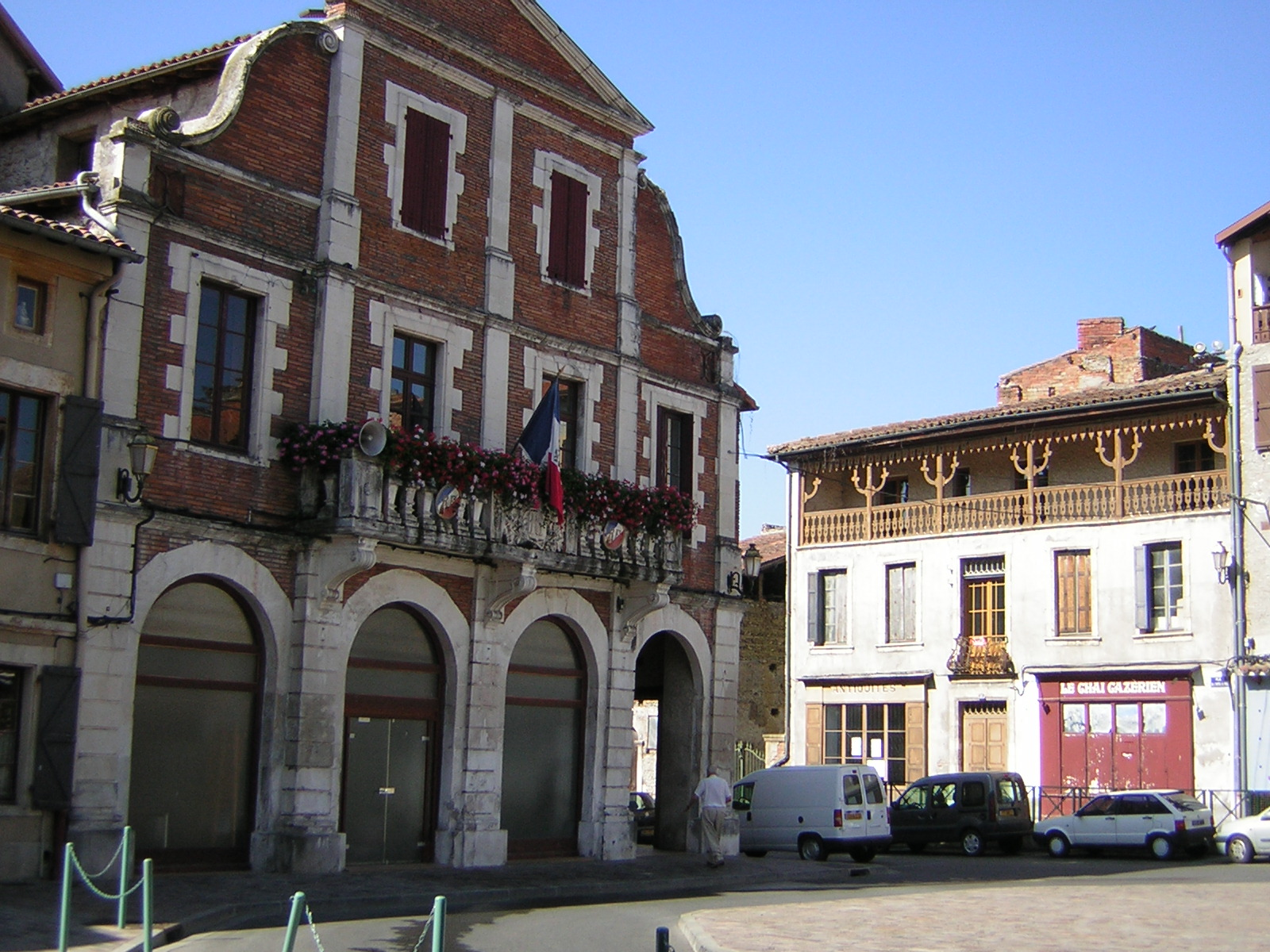
- Town hall

- Coat of arms
- Location of Cazères
- Location within France Location within Occitanie
- Coordinates: 43°12′26″N 1°05′12″E
- Country: France
- Region: Occitania
- Department: Haute-Garonne
- Arrondissement: Muret
- Canton: Cazères

Government
  - Mayor (2023–2026): Raymond Defis
- Area^{1}: 19.55 km^{2} (7.55 sq mi)
- Elevation: 240 m (790 ft)
- Highest elevation: 362 m (1,188 ft)
- Lowest elevation: 215 m (705 ft)
- Population (2023): 4,854
  - Density: 248.3/km^{2} (643.1/sq mi)
- Time zone: UTC+01:00 (CET)
  - Summer (DST): UTC+02:00 (CEST)
- INSEE/Postal code: 31135 /31220
- ^{1} French Land Register data, which excludes lakes, ponds, glaciers > 1 km^{2} (0.386 sq mi or 247 acres) and river estuaries.

Cazères (French pronunciation: [kazɛʁ]; Occitan: Casèras), or sometimes locally called as Cazères-sur-Garonne, is a small town and commune in the Haute-Garonne department in southwestern France. Cazères station has rail connections to Toulouse, Pau and Tarbes. It is the seat (capital) of the canton of Cazères.

== Geography ==
The town lies on the banks of the Garonne river, which is forming a border with Gensac-sur-Garonne, Saint-Christaud, and Couladère.

The commune is bordered by nine other communes: Lavelanet-de-Comminges to the north, Le Fousseret to the northwest, Saint-Julien-sur-Garonne to the northeast, Gensac-sur-Garonne to the east, Saint-Christaud across the river Garonne to the southeast, Couladère across the river Garonne to the south, Palaminy and Saint-Michel to the southwest, and finally by Mondavezan to the east.

== Population ==
The inhabitants of Cazères are known as Cazérien(ne)s in French.

Historical population
Year	Pop.	±% p.a.
1968	3,405	—
1975	3,419	+0.06%
1982	3,294	−0.53%
1990	3,155	−0.54%
1999	3,260	+0.36%
2007	4,129	+3.00%
2012	4,883	+3.41%
2017	4,889	+0.02%
2023	4,854	−0.12%
Source: INSEE

== Twin towns ==
Cazères is twinned with:

- Collbató, Spain (since 10 October 1986)

== See also ==
- Communes of the Haute-Garonne department
