= Gensac-sur-Garonne =

- Commune
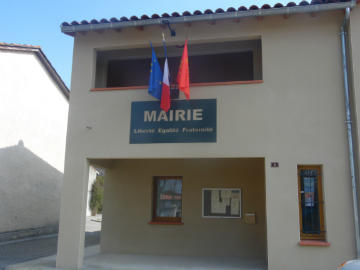
- The town hall in Gensac-sur-Garonne
- Location of Gensac-sur-Garonne
- Location within France Location within Occitanie
- Coordinates: 43°13′06″N 1°07′54″E
- Country: France
- Region: Occitania
- Department: Haute-Garonne
- Arrondissement: Muret
- Canton: Auterive
- Intercommunality: Volvestre

Government
  - Mayor (2024–2026): Sophie Jean
- Area^{1}: 10.14 km^{2} (3.92 sq mi)
- Elevation: 230 m (750 ft)
- Highest elevation: 380 m (1,250 ft)
- Lowest elevation: 215 m (705 ft)
- Population (2023): 451
  - Density: 44.5/km^{2} (115/sq mi)
- Time zone: UTC+01:00 (CET)
  - Summer (DST): UTC+02:00 (CEST)
- INSEE/Postal code: 31219 /31310
- ^{1} French Land Register data, which excludes lakes, ponds, glaciers > 1 km^{2} (0.386 sq mi or 247 acres) and river estuaries.

Gensac-sur-Garonne (French pronunciation: [ʒɑ̃sak syʁ ɡaʁɔn], literally Gensac on Garonne; Occitan: Gençac de Garona) is a commune in the Haute-Garonne department in southwestern France.

== Geography ==
The commune is bordered by five other communes: Saint-Julien-sur-Garonne across the river Garonne to the north, Rieux-Volvestre to the northeast, Goutevernisse to the east, Saint-Christaud to the south, and finally by Cazères across the river Garonne to the west.

The river Garonne flows through the commune, making the suffix -sur-Garonne, forming a border between Saint-Julien-sur-Garonne and Cazères.

== Population ==
Historical population
| Year | Pop. | ±% p.a. |
|---|---|---|
| 1968 | 238 | — |
| 1975 | 189 | −3.24% |
| 1982 | 205 | +1.17% |
| 1990 | 249 | +2.46% |
| 1999 | 264 | +0.65% |
| 2007 | 312 | +2.11% |
| 2012 | 370 | +3.47% |
| 2017 | 442 | +3.62% |
| 2023 | 451 | +0.34% |
Source: INSEE

== See also ==
- Communes of the Haute-Garonne department
