= Peyssies =

- Commune
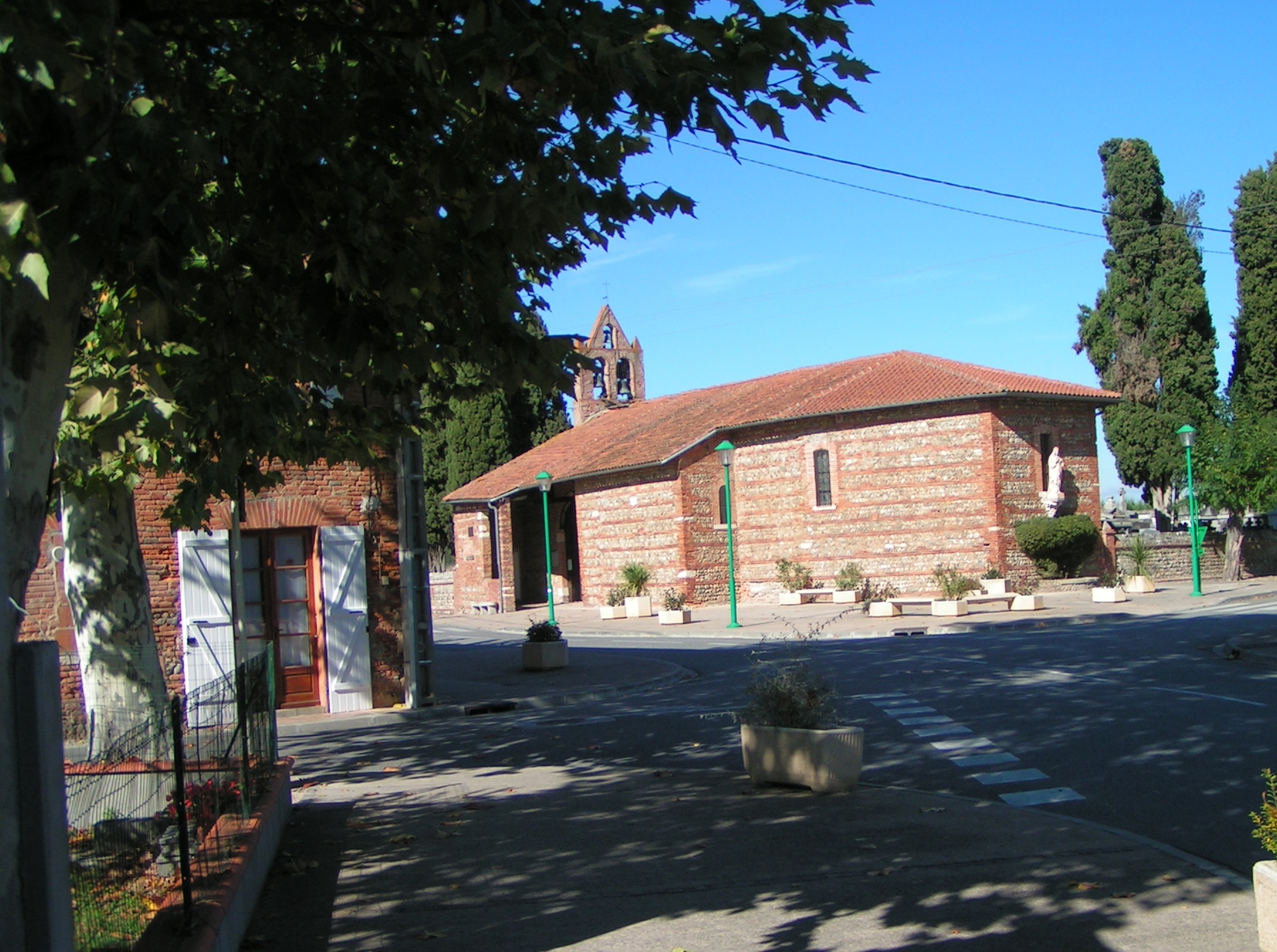
- The church in Peyssies

- Coat of arms
- Location of Peyssies
- Location within France Location within Occitanie
- Coordinates: 43°49′18″N 1°10′41″E
- Country: France
- Region: Occitania
- Department: Haute-Garonne
- Arrondissement: Muret
- Canton: Auterive
- Intercommunality: Volvestre

Government
  - Mayor (2020–2026): Daniel Grycza
- Area^{1}: 6.37 km^{2} (2.46 sq mi)
- Elevation: 225 m (738 ft)
- Highest elevation: 229 m (751 ft)
- Lowest elevation: 208 m (682 ft)
- Population (2023): 723
  - Density: 114/km^{2} (294/sq mi)
- Time zone: UTC+01:00 (CET)
  - Summer (DST): UTC+02:00 (CEST)
- INSEE/Postal code: 31416 /31390
- ^{1} French Land Register data, which excludes lakes, ponds, glaciers > 1 km^{2} (0.386 sq mi or 247 acres) and river estuaries.

Peyssies (French pronunciation: [pesi]; Occitan: Peishias) is a commune in the Haute-Garonne department in southwestern France.

== Geography ==
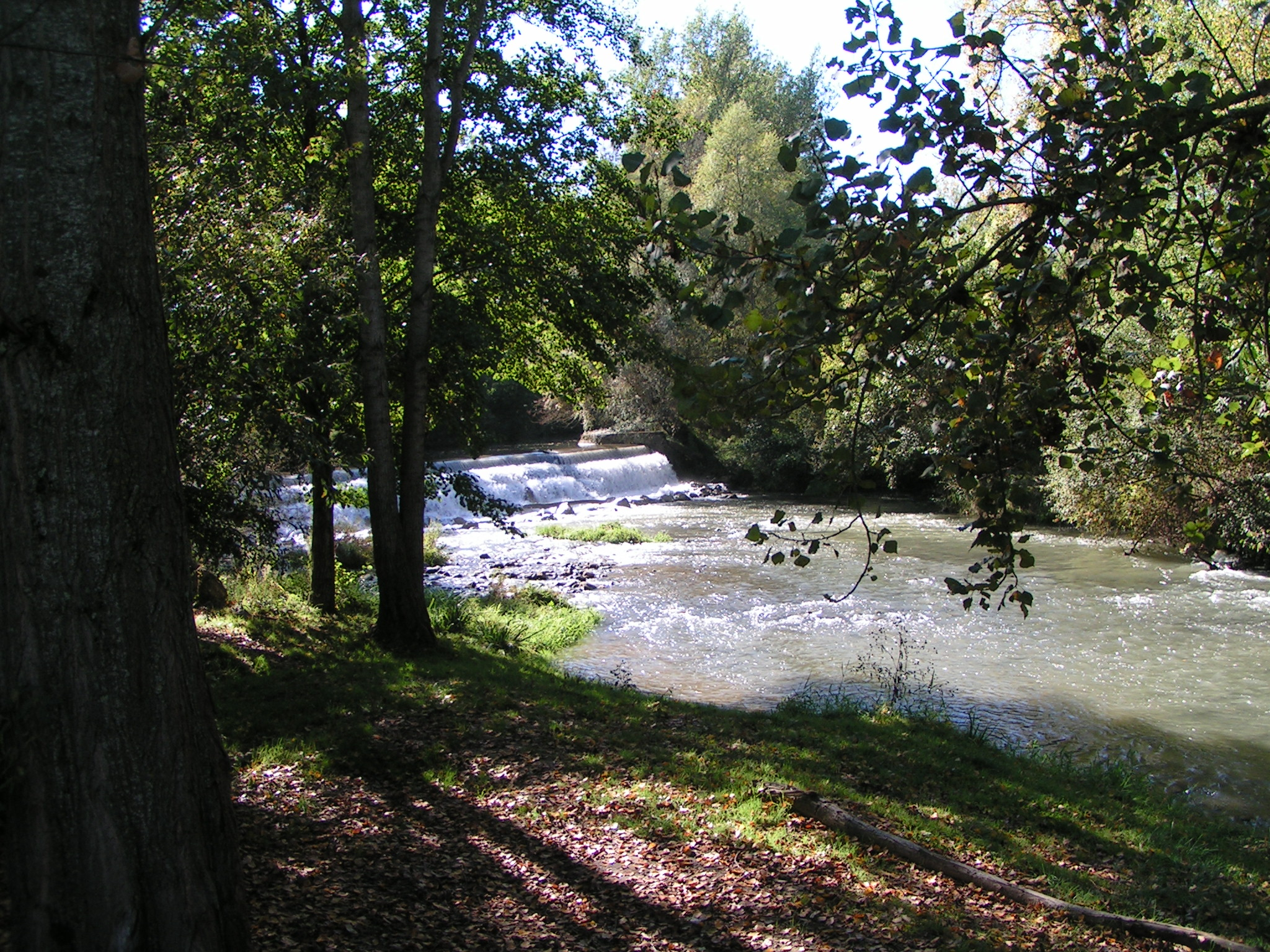
The Louge in Peyssies.

The Louge forms most of the commune's western border. The border between Bois-de-la-Pierre and Peyssies is formed by the river Louge.

The commune is bordered by five other communes: Bois-de-la-Pierre across the river Louge to the northwest, Longages to the north, Carbonne to the east, Lafitte-Vigordane to the south, and finally by Gratens to the west.

== Population ==
Historical population
Year	Pop.	±% p.a.
1968	219	—
1975	207	−0.80%
1982	261	+3.37%
1990	333	+3.09%
1999	364	+0.99%
2007	456	+2.86%
2012	535	+3.25%
2017	570	+1.28%
2023	723	+4.04%
Source: INSEE

== See also ==
- Communes of the Haute-Garonne department
