= Saint-Élix-le-Château =

- Commune
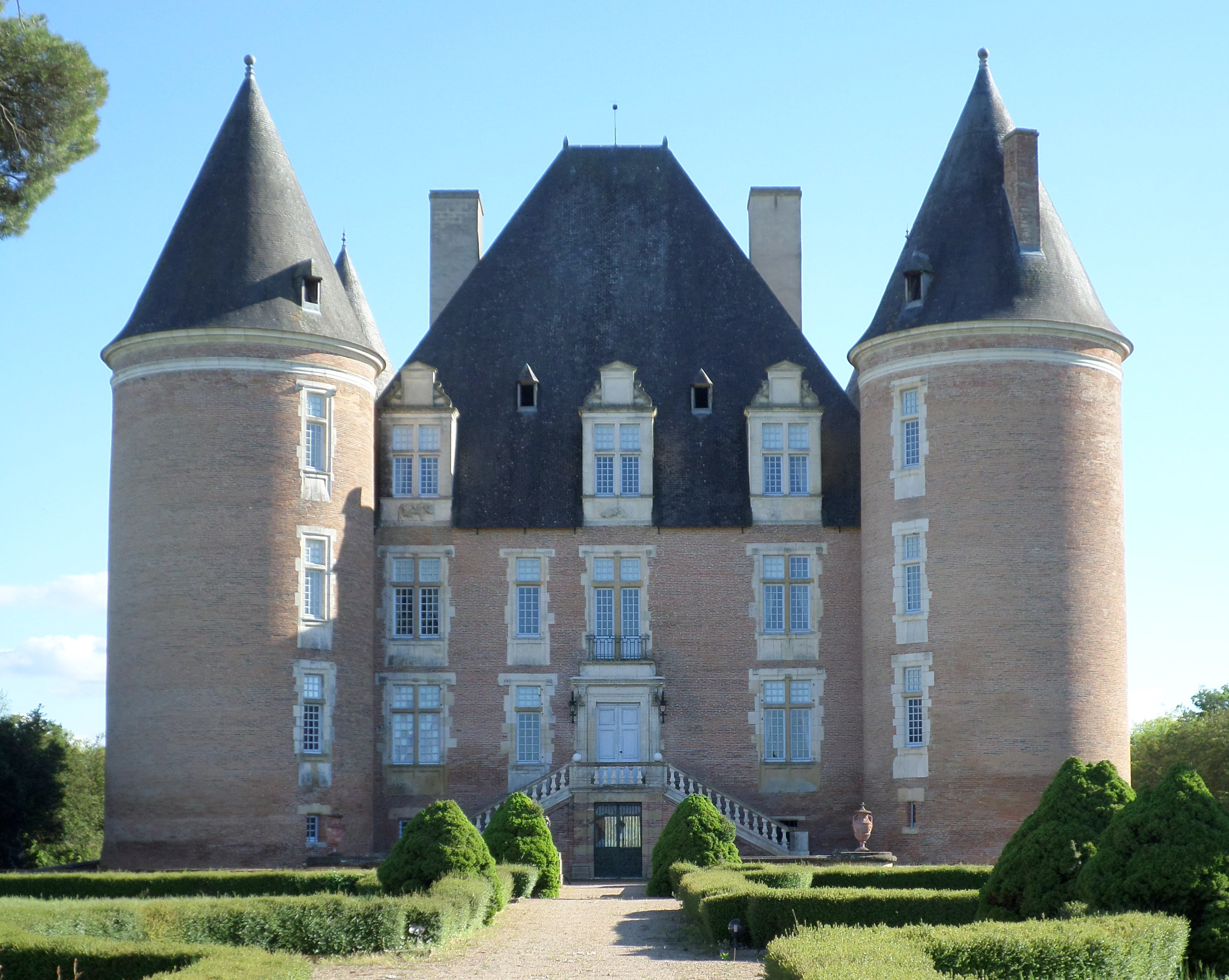
- The chateau in Saint-Élix-le-Château

- Coat of arms
- Location of Saint-Élix-le-Château
- Location within France Location within Occitanie
- Coordinates: 43°16′50″N 1°08′10″E
- Country: France
- Region: Occitania
- Department: Haute-Garonne
- Arrondissement: Muret
- Canton: Cazères

Government
  - Mayor (2020–2026): François Déprez
- Area^{1}: 10.52 km^{2} (4.06 sq mi)
- Elevation: 225 m (738 ft)
- Highest elevation: 244 m (801 ft)
- Lowest elevation: 222 m (728 ft)
- Population (2023): 933
  - Density: 88.7/km^{2} (230/sq mi)
- Time zone: UTC+01:00 (CET)
  - Summer (DST): UTC+02:00 (CEST)
- INSEE/Postal code: 31476 /31430
- ^{1} French Land Register data, which excludes lakes, ponds, glaciers > 1 km^{2} (0.386 sq mi or 247 acres) and river estuaries.

Saint-Élix-le-Château (French pronunciation: [sɛ̃t‿eliks lə ʃato]; Occitan: Sent Helitz deu Castèth) is a village and commune in the Haute-Garonne department in southwestern France. It is best known for the castle which dominates the village.

== Population ==
Historical population
Year	Pop.	±% p.a.
1968	499	—
1975	508	+0.26%
1982	524	+0.44%
1990	559	+0.81%
1999	542	−0.34%
2007	678	+2.84%
2012	759	+2.28%
2017	883	+3.07%
2023	933	+0.92%
Source: INSEE

The inhabitants of the commune are known as Saint-Élixois in French.

== Geography ==
The commune is bordered by six other communes: Marignac-Lasclares across the Louge river to the northwest, Lafitte-Vigordane to the northeast, Le Fousseret to the west, Lavelanet-de-Comminges to the southwest, Saint-Julien-sur-Garonne to the south, and finally by Salles-sur-Garonne to the east.

The river Louge flows in the commune, forming a border with the commune of Marignac-Lasclares.

== Sights ==
The Château de Saint-Élix-le-Château is a 16th-century castle which is listed as a historic site by the French Ministry of Culture in 1927, and in 1994, and it is privately owned.

== See also ==
- Communes of the Haute-Garonne department
