= Saint-Julien-sur-Garonne =

- Commune
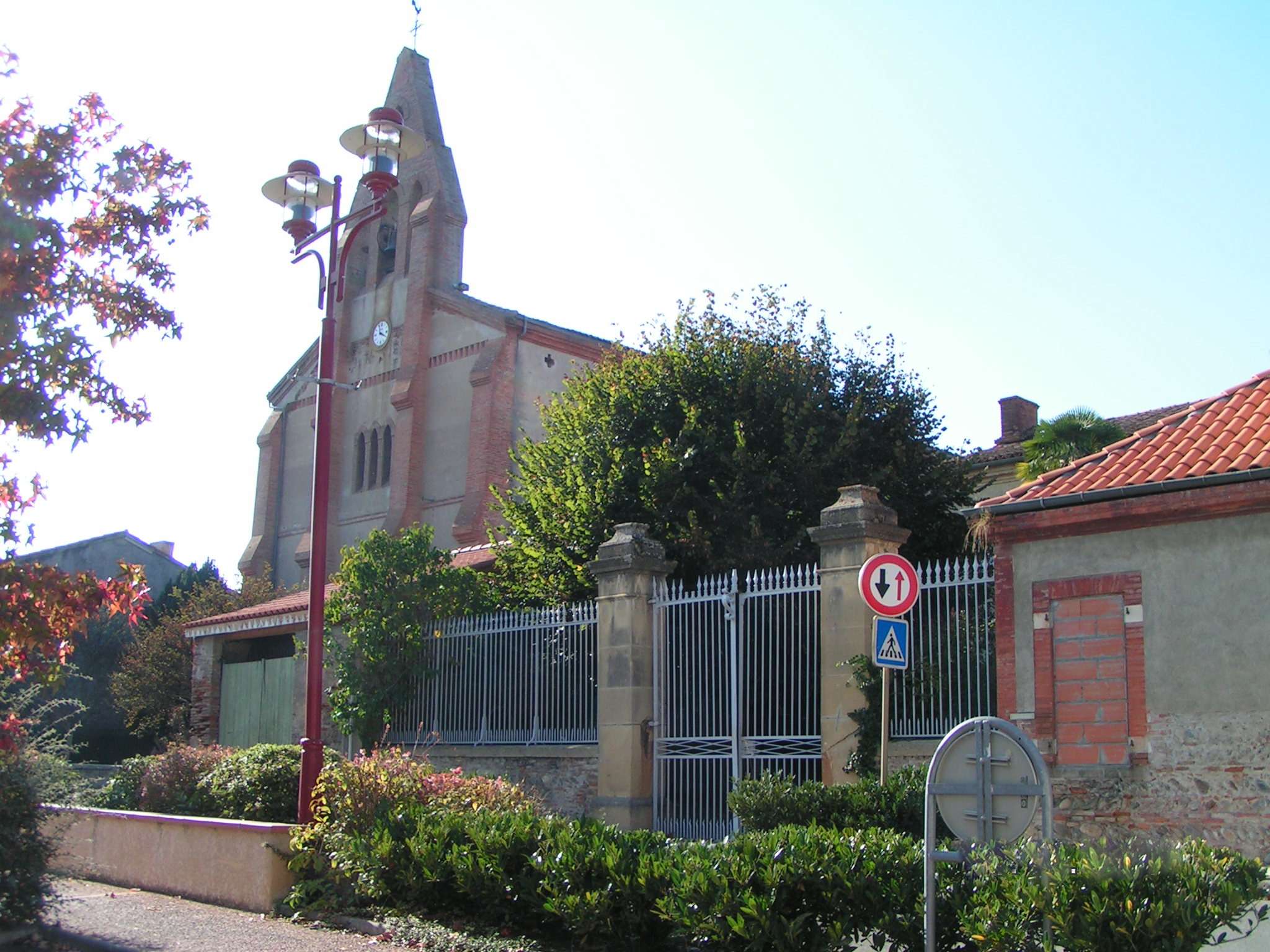
- The church in Saint-Julien-sur-Garonne

- Coat of arms
- Location of Saint-Julien-sur-Garonne
- Location within France Location within Occitanie
- Coordinates: 43°14′37″N 1°09′11″E
- Country: France
- Region: Occitania
- Department: Haute-Garonne
- Arrondissement: Muret
- Canton: Auterive
- Intercommunality: Volvestre

Government
  - Mayor (2020–2026): Patrick Lefebvre
- Area^{1}: 8.15 km^{2} (3.15 sq mi)
- Elevation: 223 m (732 ft)
- Highest elevation: 241 m (791 ft)
- Lowest elevation: 205 m (673 ft)
- Population (2023): 549
  - Density: 67.4/km^{2} (174/sq mi)
- Time zone: UTC+01:00 (CET)
  - Summer (DST): UTC+02:00 (CEST)
- INSEE/Postal code: 31492 /31220
- ^{1} French Land Register data, which excludes lakes, ponds, glaciers > 1 km^{2} (0.386 sq mi or 247 acres) and river estuaries.

Saint-Julien-sur-Garonne (French pronunciation: [sɛ̃ ʒyljɛ̃ syʁ ɡaʁɔn], literally Saint-Julien on Garonne; before September 2005: Saint-Julien; Occitan: Sent Julian de Garona) is a commune in the Haute-Garonne department in southwestern France.

== Geography ==
The commune is bordered by six other communes: Saint-Élix-le-Château to the north, Salles-sur-Garonne across the river Garonne to the northeast, Lavelanet-de-Comminges to the west, Rieux-Volvestre to the east, Gensac-sur-Garonne across the river Garonne to the south, and finally by Cazères to the southwest.

The river Garonne flows through the commune, making the suffix -sur-Garonne, forming a border with Gensac-sur-Garonne and Salles-sur-Garonne.

== History ==
The commune of Saint-Julien was renamed to Saint-Julien-sur-Garonne in 2005 by a decision.

== Population ==
Historical population
Year	Pop.	±% p.a.
1968	341	—
1975	285	−2.53%
1982	282	−0.15%
1990	291	+0.39%
1999	342	+1.81%
2007	430	+2.90%
2012	534	+4.43%
2017	553	+0.70%
2023	549	−0.12%
Source: INSEE

The inhabitants of the commune are called Saint-Julienois in French.

== See also ==
- Communes of the Haute-Garonne department
