= Longages =

- Commune
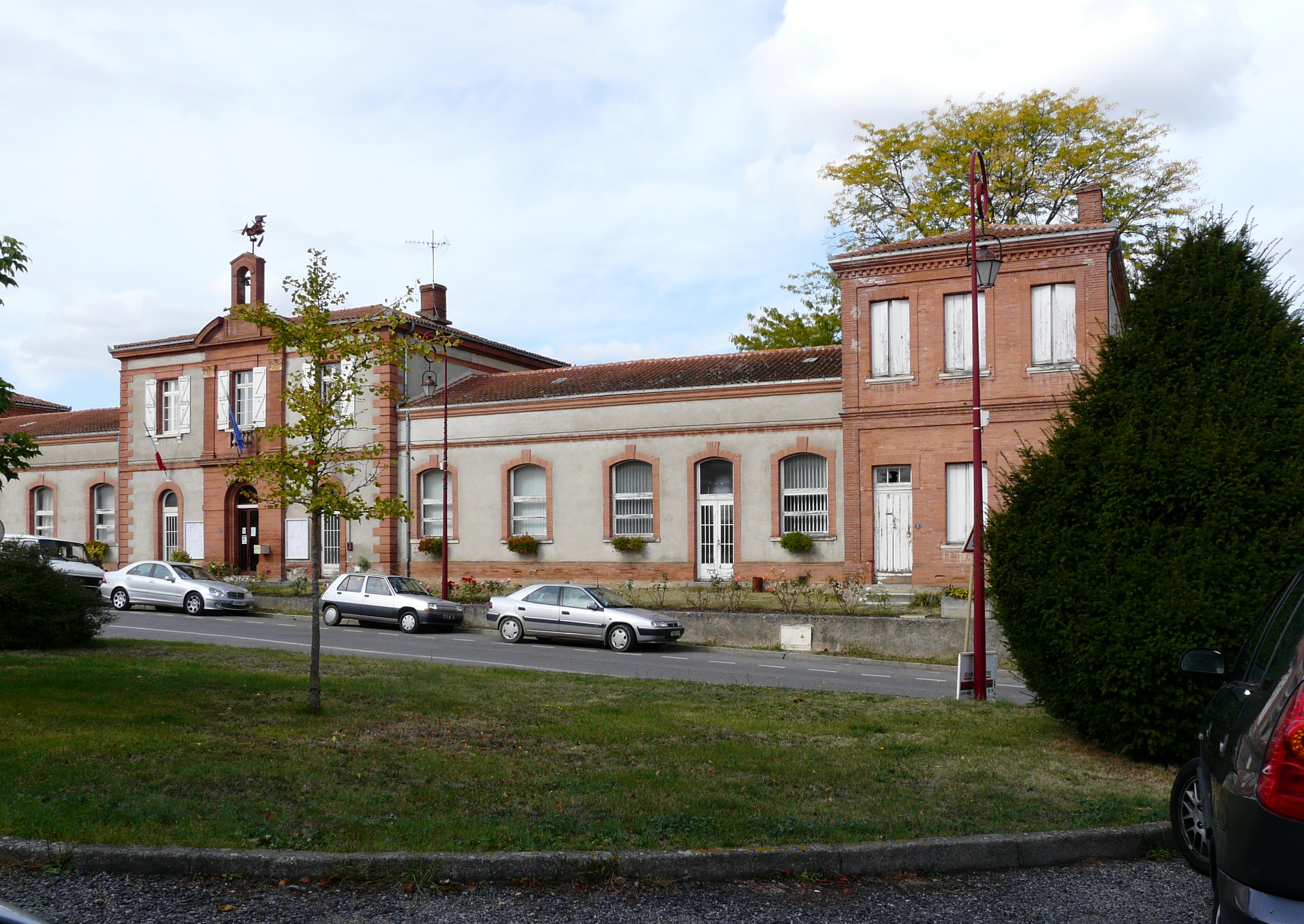
- Town hall
- Location of Longages
- Location within France Location within Occitanie
- Coordinates: 43°21′21″N 1°14′27″E
- Country: France
- Region: Occitania
- Department: Haute-Garonne
- Arrondissement: Muret
- Canton: Auterive

Government
  - Mayor (2020–2026): Jean-Michel Dallard
- Area^{1}: 21.42 km^{2} (8.27 sq mi)
- Elevation: 194 m (636 ft)
- Highest elevation: 220 m (720 ft)
- Lowest elevation: 190 m (620 ft)
- Population (2023): 3,392
  - Density: 158.4/km^{2} (410.1/sq mi)
- Time zone: UTC+01:00 (CET)
  - Summer (DST): UTC+02:00 (CEST)
- INSEE/Postal code: 31303 /31410
- ^{1} French Land Register data, which excludes lakes, ponds, glaciers > 1 km^{2} (0.386 sq mi or 247 acres) and river estuaries.

Longages (French pronunciation: [lɔ̃ɡaʒ]; Occitan: Longatges) is a large village and commune in the Haute-Garonne department in southwestern France. It is best known for the castle which dominates the village.

== Population ==
Historical population
Year	Pop.	±% p.a.
1968	921	—
1975	1,101	+2.58%
1982	1,332	+2.76%
1990	1,691	+3.03%
1999	1,899	+1.30%
2007	2,468	+3.33%
2012	2,811	+2.64%
2017	3,082	+1.86%
2023	3,392	+1.61%
Source: INSEE

== Geography ==
The commune is bordered by seven other communes: Lavernose-Lacasse to the north, Noé to the east, Capens to the southeast, Carbonne to the south, Peyssies to the southwest, Bois-de-la-Pierre to the west, and finally by Bérat to the northwest.

== Sights ==
The Château Sainte-Marie is a privately owned castle dating from the second half of the 16th century, modified and altered during the 19th century. It is listed as a historic site by the French Ministry of Culture in 1984.

== Transport ==
Longages-Noé station has rail connections to Toulouse, Pau and Tarbes.

== See also ==
- Communes of the Haute-Garonne department
