= Puimanyons =

- Locality
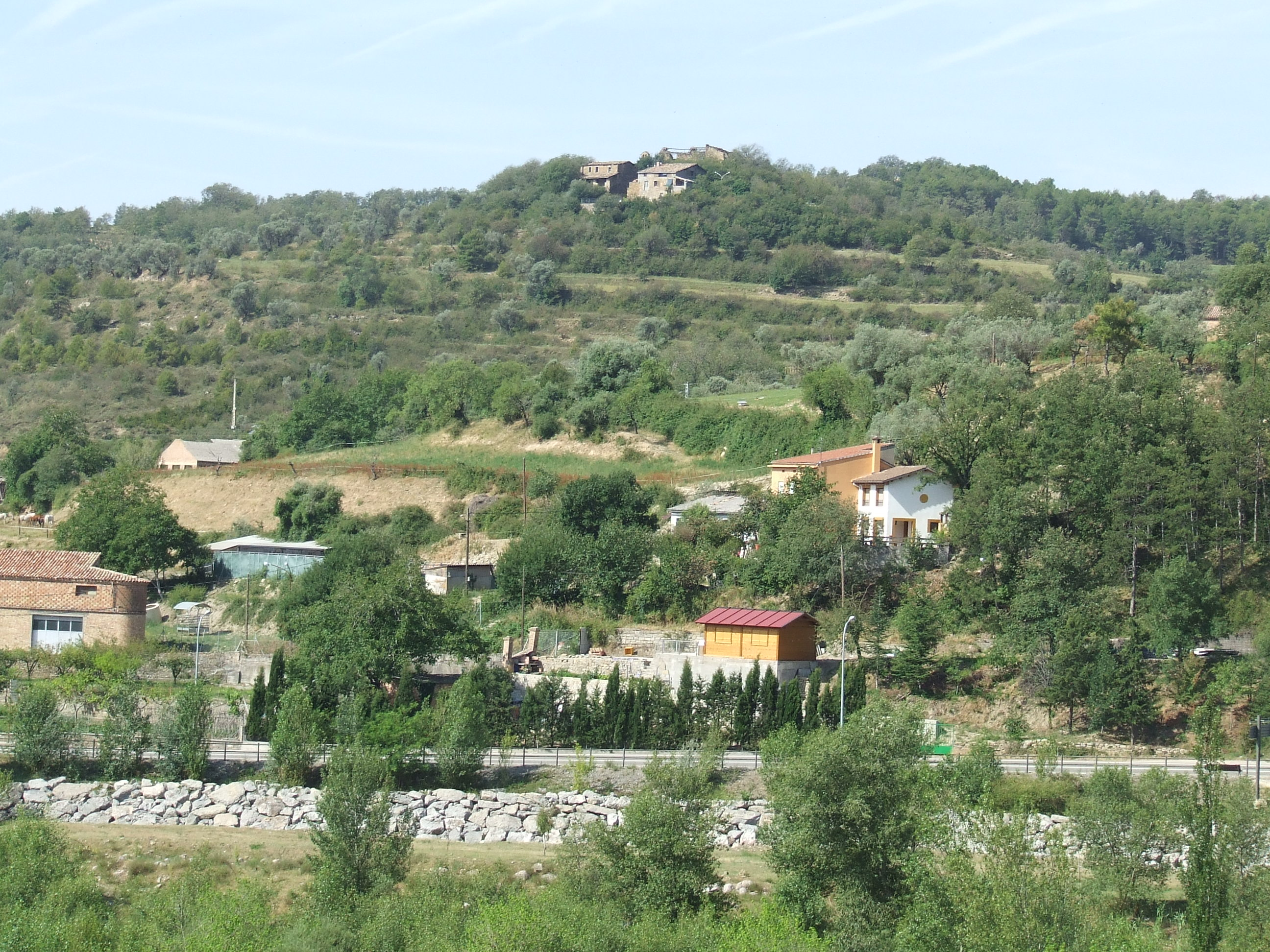

- Location within Province of Lleida Location within Catalonia Location within Spain
- Coordinates: 42°14′27″N 0°57′36″E
- Country: Spain
- Community: Catalonia
- Province: Lleida
- Municipality: La Pobla de Segur
- Elevation: 607 m (1,991 ft)

Population
  - Total: 3

Puimanyons or Pumanyons is a hamlet located in the municipality of La Pobla de Segur, in Province of Lleida province, Catalonia, Spain. As of 2020, it has a population of 3.
