= Sant Joan de Vinyafrescal =

- Locality
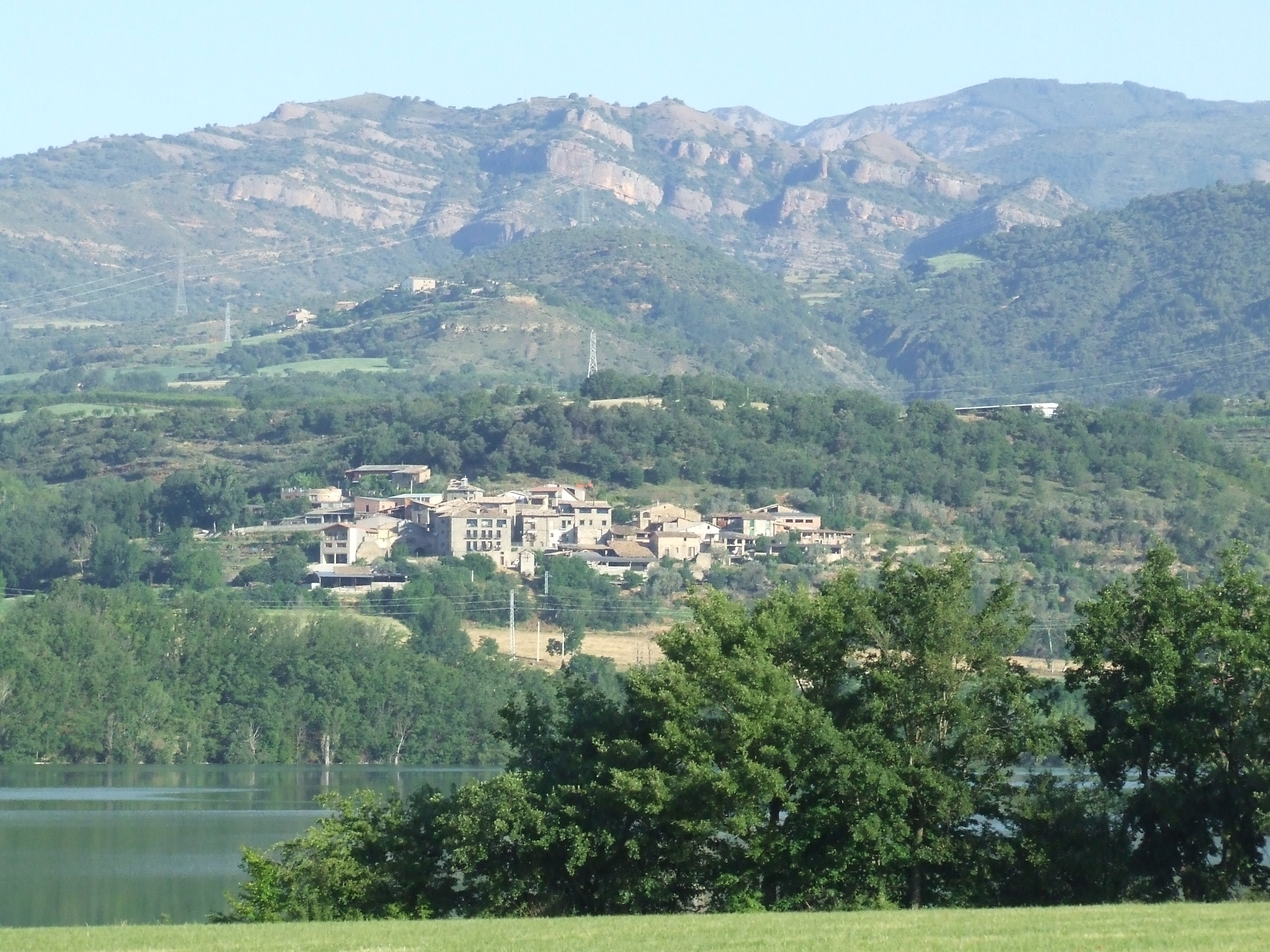

- Location within Province of Lleida Location within Catalonia Location within Spain
- Coordinates: 42°13′43″N 0°57′34″E
- Country: Spain
- Community: Catalonia
- Province: Lleida
- Municipality: La Pobla de Segur
- Elevation: 561 m (1,841 ft)

Population
  - Total: 68

Sant Joan de Vinyafrescal is a village located in the municipality of La Pobla de Segur, in Province of Lleida province, Catalonia, Spain. As of 2020, it has a population of 68.

== Geography ==
Sant Joan de Vinyafrescal is located 102km north-northeast of Lleida.
