= Longages–Noé station =

Railway station in Longages, France

Longages–Noé
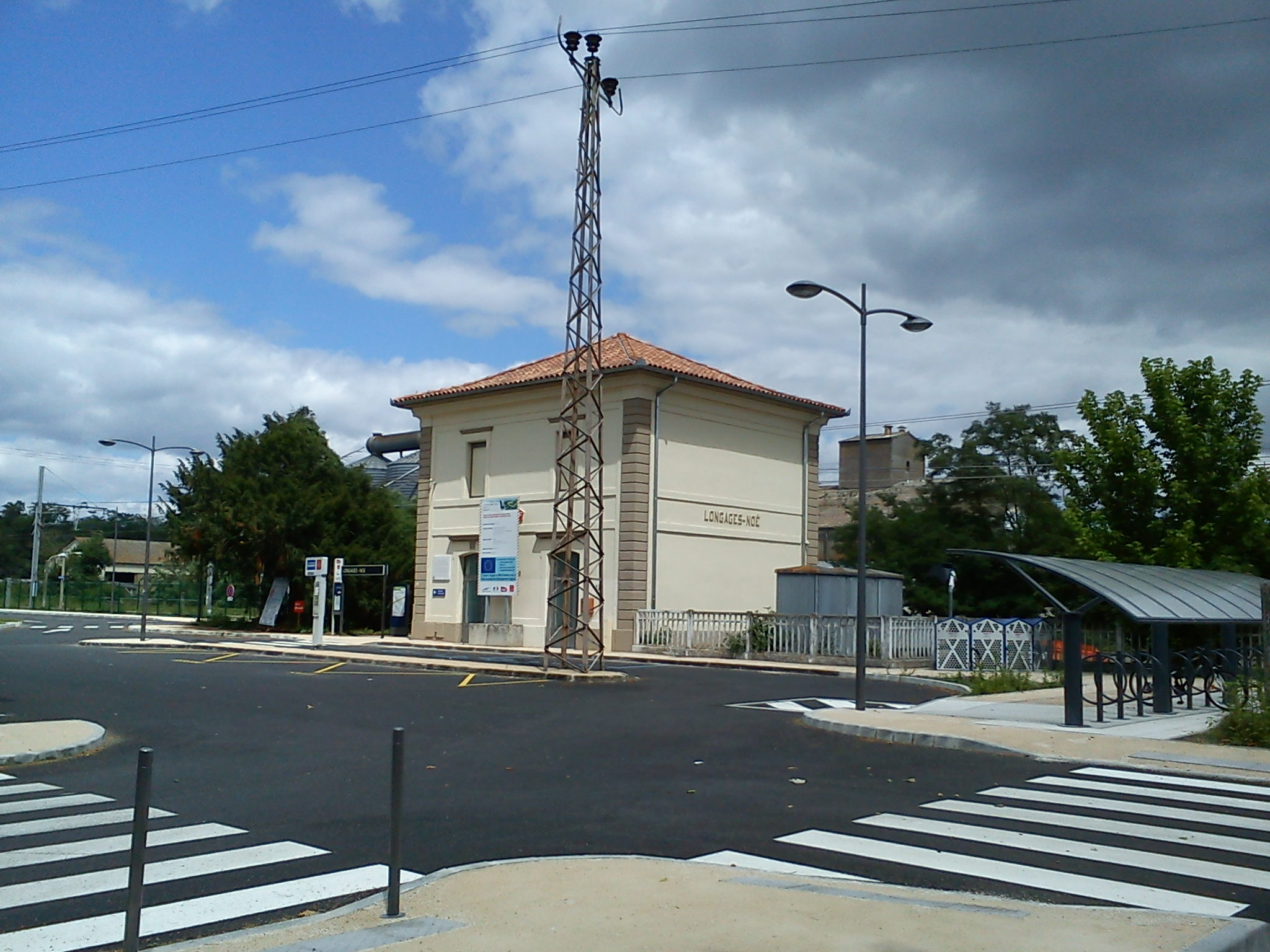
- Longages-Noé railway station

General information
- Location: Longages, Haute-Garonne, Occitanie, France
- Coordinates: 43°21′21″N 1°15′05″E
- Line: Toulouse–Bayonne railway
- Platforms: 2
- Tracks: 2

Other information
- Station code: 87611053

History
- Opened: 9 June 1862

Services
Preceding station	TER Occitanie	Following station
Carbonne towards Pau	15	Le Fauga towards Toulouse
Location

Longages–Noé is a railway station near Longages and Noé, Occitanie, France. The station is on the Toulouse–Bayonne railway. The station is served by TER (local) services operated by the SNCF.

== Train services ==
The following services currently call at Longages-Noé:

- local service (TER Occitanie) Toulouse–Saint-Gaudens–Tarbes–Pau
