= Château de Saint-Élix-le-Château =

16th-century castle in Haute-Garonne, France

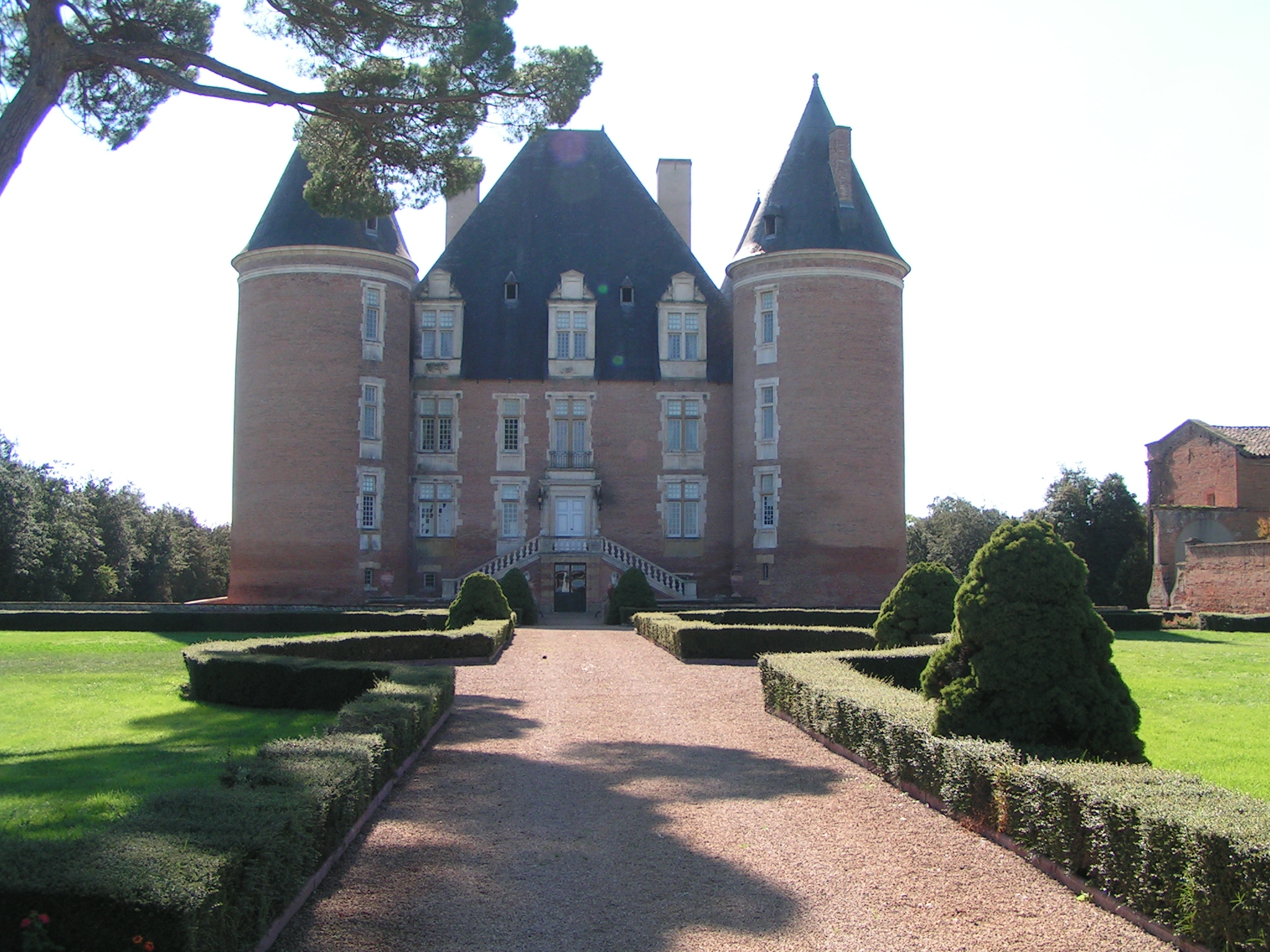
- Château de Saint-Élix

- Location within France
- 43°16′41″N 1°08′11″E

History
- Built: 1540 to 1548
- Original use: Castle

Site notes
- Current use: Private
- Owner: Private

Monument historique
- Designated: 1927 and 1994

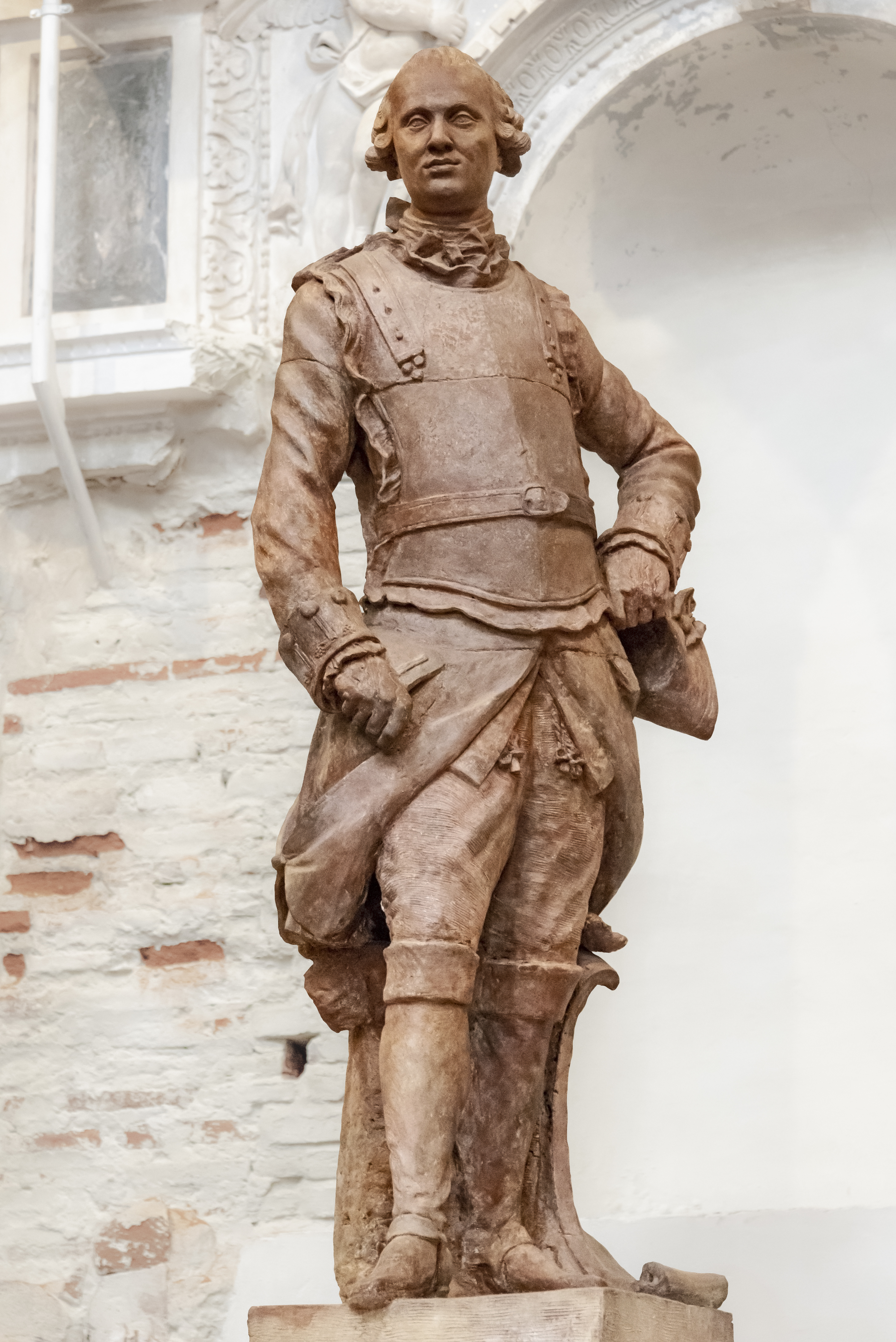
Jean-Charles Ledesmé, baron de Saint-Elix by François Lucas

The Château de Saint-Élix is a 16th-century castle in the commune of Saint-Élix-le-Château in the Haute-Garonne département of France.

Built in the 1540s, it is privately owned and has been listed since 1927 as a monument historique by the French Ministry of Culture. Of note are the orangery, stables, walls and pigeon loft.

== See also ==
- List of castles in France
