= Salles-sur-Garonne =

- Commune
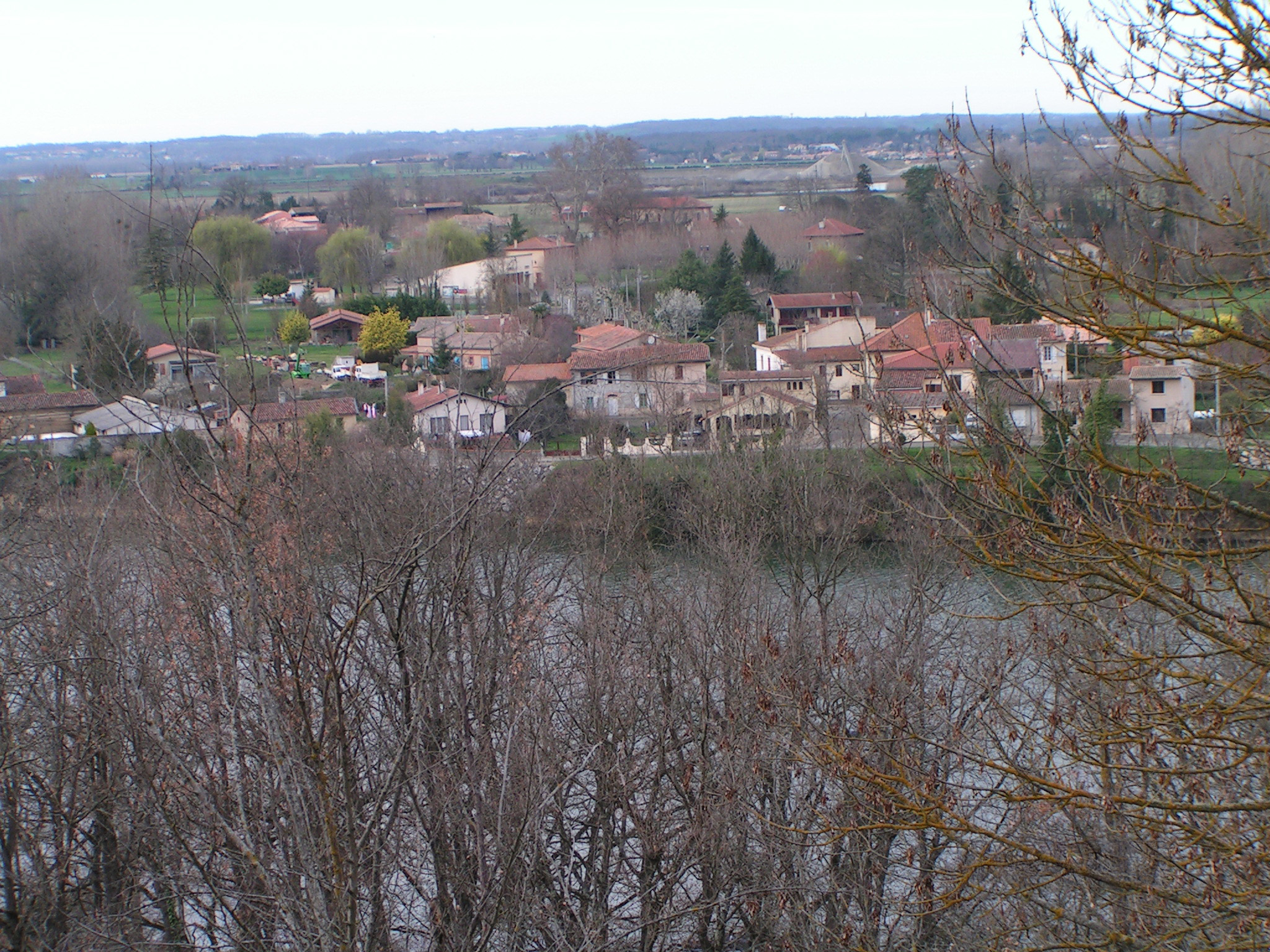
- A general view of Salles-sur-Garonne
- Location of Salles-sur-Garonne
- Location within France Location within Occitanie
- Coordinates: 43°16′25″N 1°10′50″E
- Country: France
- Region: Occitania
- Department: Haute-Garonne
- Arrondissement: Muret
- Canton: Auterive
- Intercommunality: Volvestre

Government
  - Mayor (2020–2026): Pierre Caillet
- Area^{1}: 5.68 km^{2} (2.19 sq mi)
- Elevation: 224 m (735 ft)
- Highest elevation: 229 m (751 ft)
- Lowest elevation: 205 m (673 ft)
- Population (2023): 584
  - Density: 103/km^{2} (266/sq mi)
- Time zone: UTC+01:00 (CET)
  - Summer (DST): UTC+02:00 (CEST)
- INSEE/Postal code: 31525 /31390
- ^{1} French Land Register data, which excludes lakes, ponds, glaciers > 1 km^{2} (0.386 sq mi or 247 acres) and river estuaries.

Salles-sur-Garonne (French pronunciation: [sal syʁ ɡaʁɔn], literally Salles on Garonne; Occitan: Salas de Garona) is a commune in the Haute-Garonne department in southwestern France.

== Population ==
Historical population
Year	Pop.	±% p.a.
1968	208	—
1975	217	+0.61%
1982	215	−0.13%
1990	250	+1.90%
1999	301	+2.08%
2007	468	+5.67%
2012	511	+1.77%
2017	573	+2.32%
2023	584	+0.32%
Source: INSEE

== Geography ==
The commune is bordered by five other communes: Lafitte-Vigordane to the north, Carbonne to the northeast, Rieux-Volvestre across the river Garonne to the east, Saint-Julien-sur-Garonne to the south, and Saint-Élix-le-Château to the east.

The river Garonne flows through the commune, making the suffix -sur-Garonne, forming a border with Saint-Julien-sur-Garonne.

== International relations ==
In 2010, Salles-sur-Garonne became a sister city of Lhatse, Tibet.

== See also ==
- Communes of the Haute-Garonne department
