= La Pobla de Segur =

- Municipality
- La Pobla de Segur
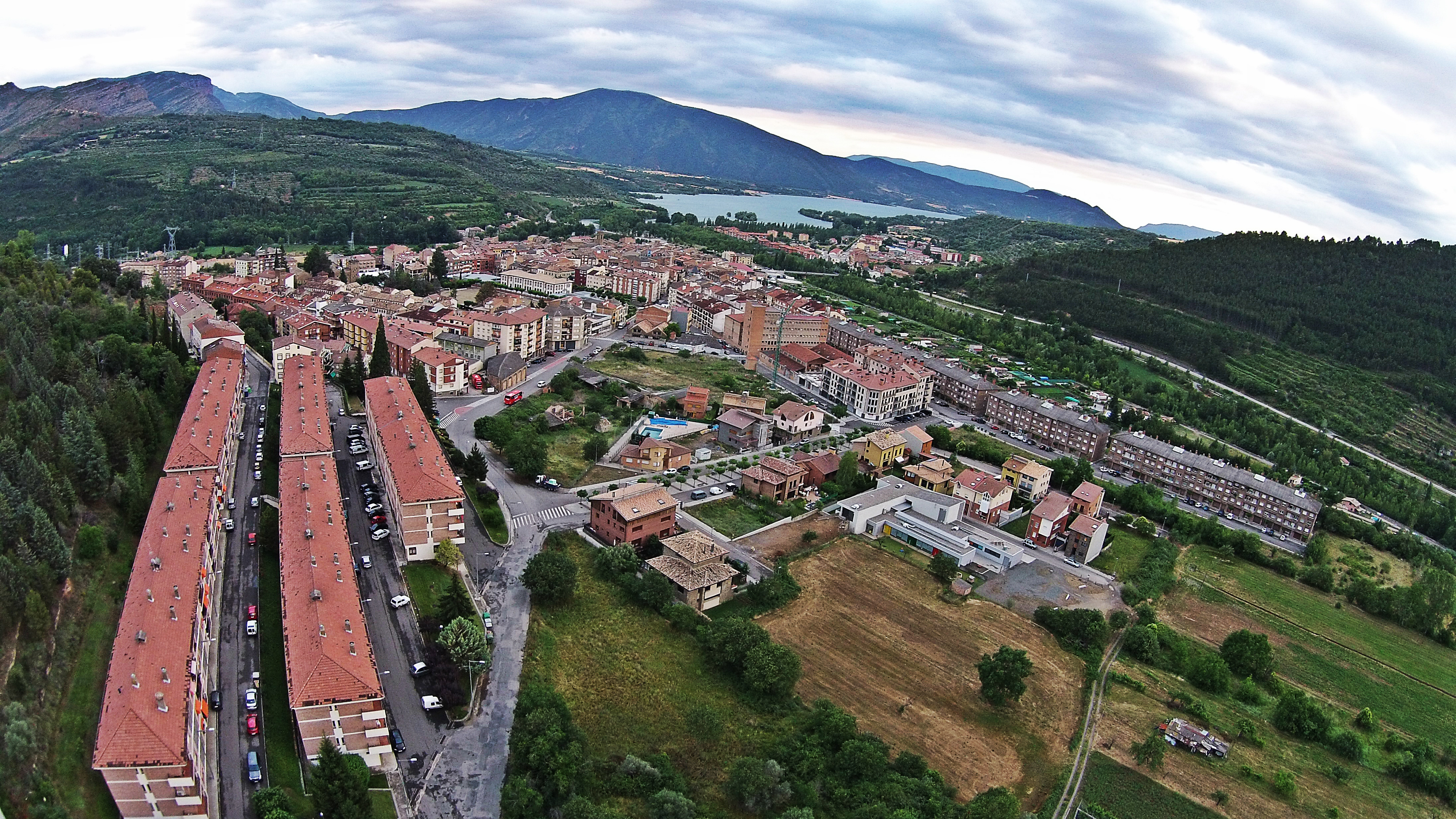

- Coat of arms

- Location in Catalonia
- Coordinates: 42°14′51″N 0°58′03″E
- Country: Spain
- Autonomous community: Catalonia
- Province: Lleida
- Comarca: Pallars Jussà

Government
  - Mayor: Lluís Bellera Juanmartí (2015) (ERC)

Area
  - Total: 32.8 km^{2} (12.7 sq mi)
- Elevation: 524 m (1,719 ft)

Population (2025-01-01)
  - Total: 3,143
  - Density: 95.8/km^{2} (248/sq mi)
- Demonym(s): poblatà, poblatana
- Time zone: UTC+1 (CET)
  - Summer (DST): UTC+2 (CEST)
- Postal code: 25500
- Dialing code: 34 (Spain) + 973 (Lleida)
- Official language(s): Catalan and Spanish
- Website: pobladesegur.cat

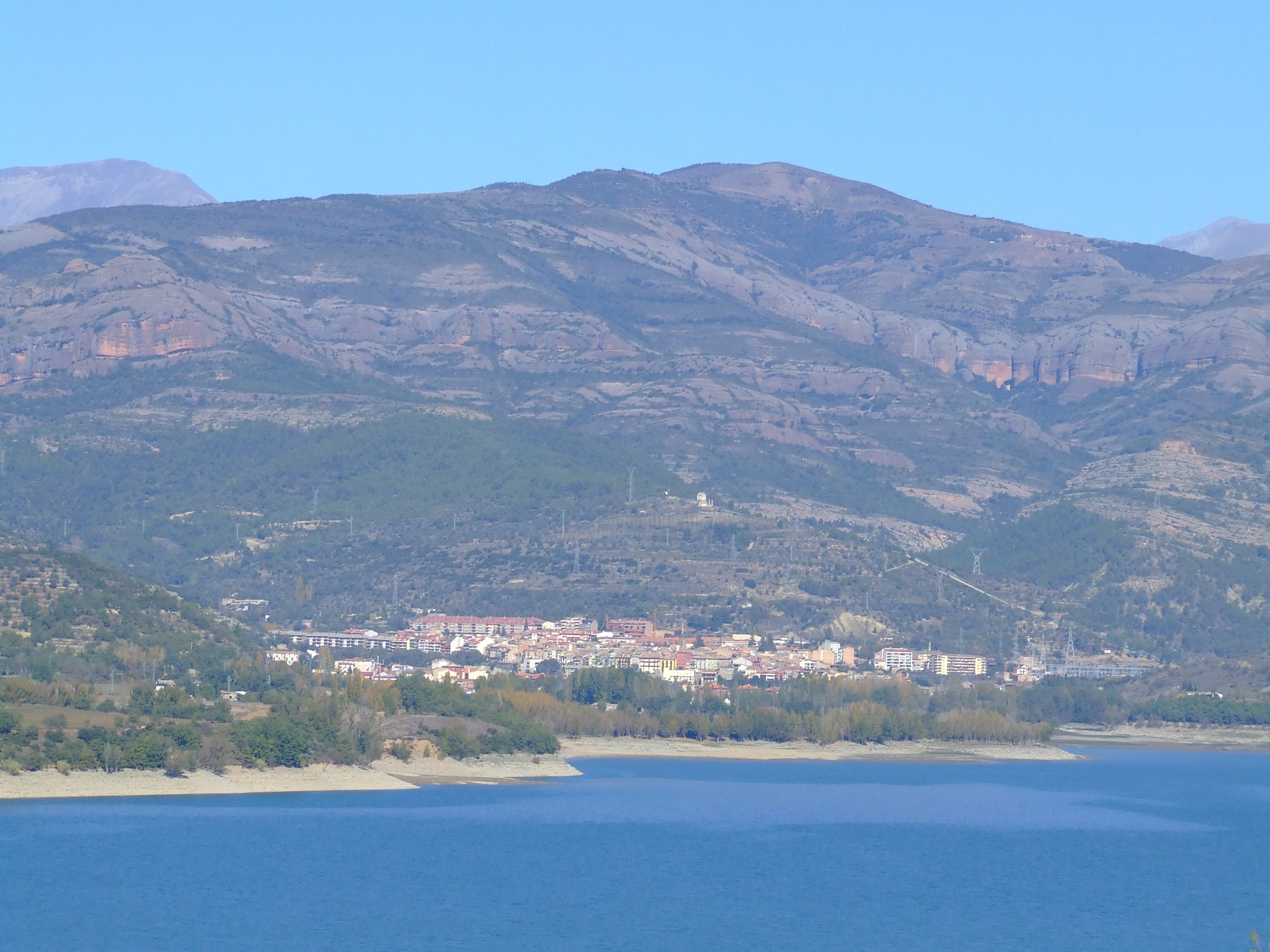
La Pobla de Segur.

La Pobla de Segur (Catalan pronunciation: [la ˈpoβla ðe seˈɣu]) is a municipality located in the comarca of Pallars Jussà, province of Lleida, Catalonia, in northern Spain. It has a population of 3,143 (register office, 2025). It is situated at the confluence of the Flamicell and Noguera Pallaresa rivers in the north of the comarca, above the Sant Antoni reservoir. It is an important local service centre, which has allowed it to escape the depopulation which has affected many municipalities in northwestern Catalonia. The village is served by the C-13 road between Tremp and Sort, the N-260 road to Pont de Suert and by a railway station on a railway line to Lleida.

Famous people from La Pobla de Segur include FC Barcelona player Carles Puyol and former High Representative of the Union for Foreign Affairs and Security Policy Josep Borrell. It is a designated book town, due to the high number of bookshops in the vicinity.

== History ==
The earliest settlement in the area was to the north of the present town, known as El Pui de Segur. It was incorporated into the county of Pallars after Count Guillaume I of Toulouse conquered the region from the Moors in the ninth century. The town was transferred to its current location in the middle of the thirteenth century, and came under the control of Pere VII el Donzell, Viscount of Vilamur, in 1355. His son Pere VIII granted the first charter to the town in 1363. Control would later pass to the Dukes of Cardona.

The Comú de Particulars is a local cooperative, established in 1834 to manage a flour mill given to the town by the Duke of Cardona; open to natives of the town or their spouses, it is now a cultural organisation managing the income from the local hydroelectric power station. The Torre Maure is a notable group of modernista buildings from the start of the twentieth century.

== Demography ==
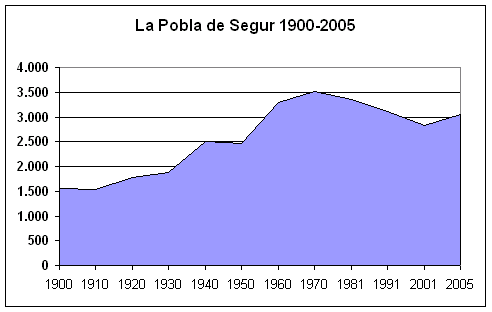
Demographic evolution

Demographic evolution
1900	1910	1920	1930	1940	1950	1960	1970	1981	1991	1996	2001	2005	2011	2013
1.549	1.529	1.775	1.883	2.511	2.469	3.288	3.513	3.356	3.114	2.997	2.789	3.043	3.246	3.073

== Subdivisions ==
The municipality of La Pobla de Segur includes three outlying villages: populations are given as of 2005.

- Montsor (2)
- Puimanyons (3), on the right bank of the Flamicell river at its confluence with the Noguera Pallaresa.
- Sant Joan de Vinyafrescal (63), to the south of la Pobla de Segur on the right bank of the Sant Antoni reservoir.

== Notable people ==
- Pedro Cortina y Mauri, (born La Pobla de Segur, 18 March 1908 - Madrid, 14 February 1993) was a Spanish politician and diplomat who served as the last Minister of Foreign Affairs under Francisco Franco between 1974 and 1975
- Josep Borrell Fontelles, (born 24 April 1947) is a Spanish politician, member of the Spanish Socialist Party. He has been Minister of Public Works and Environment of the Government of Spain (1991-1996) and President of the European Parliament (2004-2007). In June 4th of 2018 he became Minister of Foreign Affairs and Cooperation of Spain.
- Carles Puyol, (born 13, April, 1978), ex-footballer who played for FC Barcelona and Spain as a defender and won 2010 FIFA World Cup.

== Sister cities ==
- Castellavazzo, Italy
- Le Fousseret, France
