= Château Sainte-Marie =

Castle in Longages in the Haute-Garonne département of France

Coordinates: 43°21′27″N 1°14′22″E

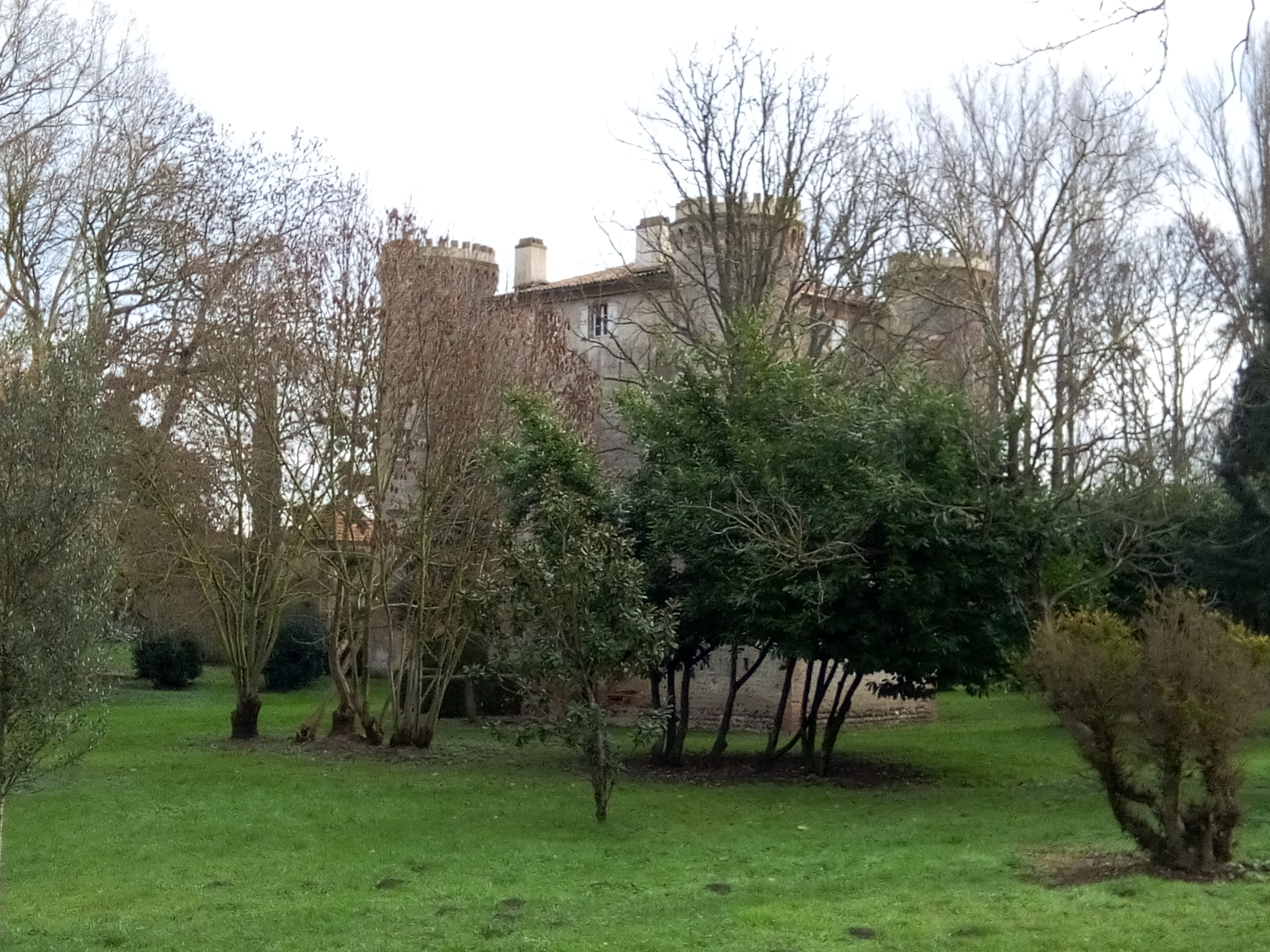
Castle of Sainte-Marie, Longages municipal, France

The Château Sainte-Marie is a castle dating from the second half of the 16th century, modified and altered during the 19th century, in the commune of Longages in the Haute-Garonne département of France.

Privately owned, it has been listed since 1984 as a monument historique by the French Ministry of Culture.

== See also ==
- List of castles in France
