= Montsor =

- Locality
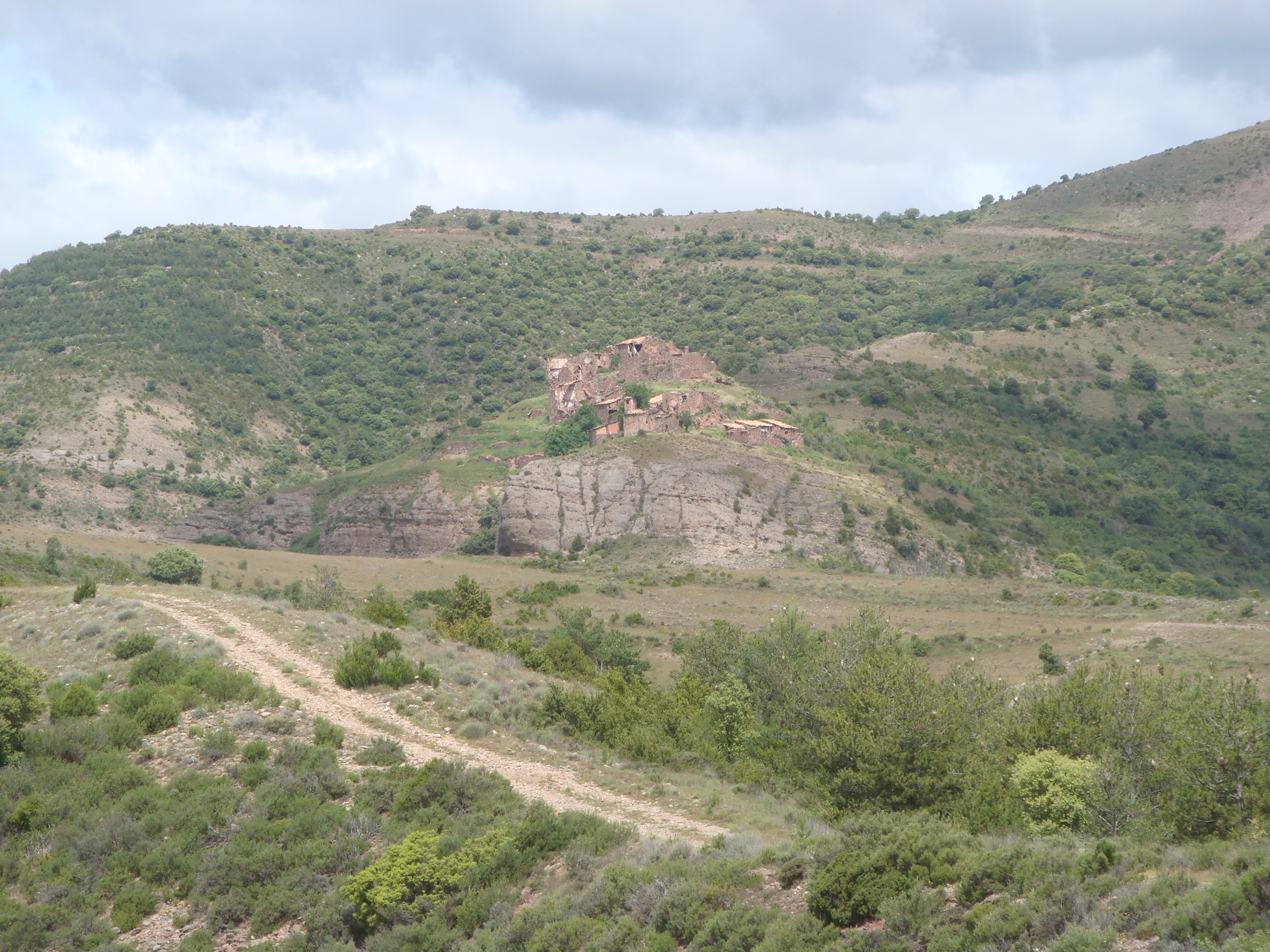

- Location within Province of Lleida Location within Catalonia Location within Spain
- Coordinates: 42°17′27″N 0°58′43″E
- Country: Spain
- Community: Catalonia
- Province: Lleida
- Municipality: La Pobla de Segur
- Elevation: 1,234 m (4,049 ft)

Population
  - Total: 0

Montsor is a deserted hamlet located in the municipality of La Pobla de Segur, in Province of Lleida province, Catalonia, Spain. As of 2020, it has a population of 0.

== Geography ==
Montsor is located 123km north-northeast of Lleida.
