= Lavelanet-de-Comminges =

- Commune
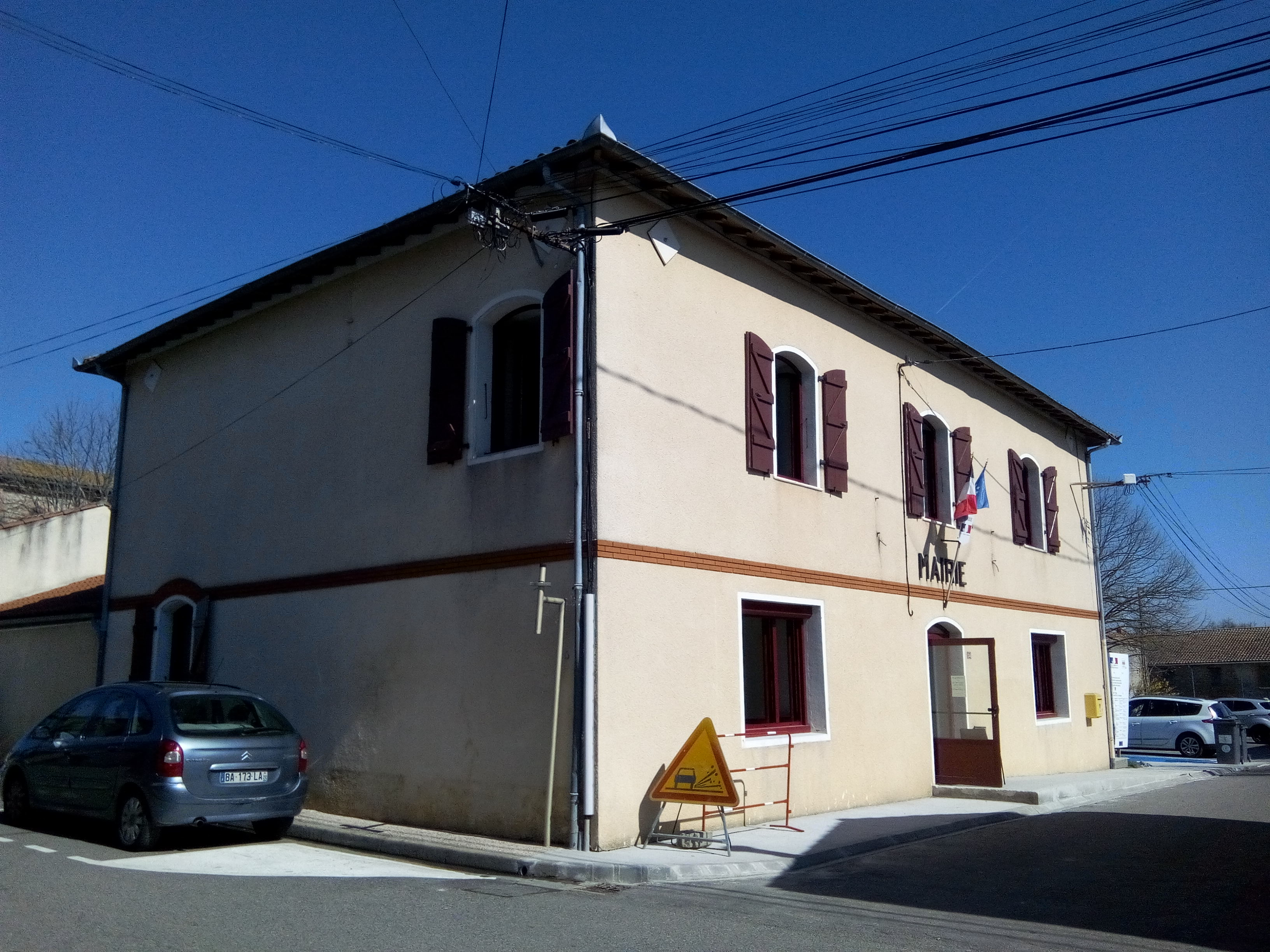
- The town hall in Lavelanet-de-Comminges

- Coat of arms
- Location of Lavelanet-de-Comminges
- Location within France Location within Occitanie
- Coordinates: 43°15′22″N 1°07′09″E
- Country: France
- Region: Occitania
- Department: Haute-Garonne
- Arrondissement: Muret
- Canton: Auterive
- Intercommunality: Volvestre

Government
  - Mayor (2020–2026): Jean Chalduc
- Area^{1}: 13.54 km^{2} (5.23 sq mi)
- Elevation: 245 m (804 ft)
- Highest elevation: 253 m (830 ft)
- Lowest elevation: 232 m (761 ft)
- Population (2023): 653
  - Density: 48.2/km^{2} (125/sq mi)
- Time zone: UTC+01:00 (CET)
  - Summer (DST): UTC+02:00 (CEST)
- INSEE/Postal code: 31286 /31220
- ^{1} French Land Register data, which excludes lakes, ponds, glaciers > 1 km^{2} (0.386 sq mi or 247 acres) and river estuaries.

Lavelanet-de-Comminges (French pronunciation: [lavlanɛ də kɔmɛ̃ʒ], literally Lavelanet of Comminges; Occitan: L'Avereit de Comenge) is a commune in the Haute-Garonne department in southwestern France.

== Population ==
Historical population
Year	Pop.	±% p.a.
1968	491	—
1975	492	+0.03%
1982	420	−2.23%
1990	465	+1.28%
1999	483	+0.42%
2007	535	+1.29%
2012	574	+1.42%
2017	625	+1.72%
2023	653	+0.73%
Source: INSEE

The inhabitants of the commune are known as Lavelanéciens in French.

== Geography ==
The commune is bordered by four other communes: Le Fousseret to the northwest, Cazères to the southwest, Saint-Élix-le-Château to the northeast, and finally by Saint-Julien-sur-Garonne to the southeast.

== Twin towns ==
Lavelanet-de-Comminges is twinned with:

- Brazii, Romania
- Narthang, China

== See also ==
Communes of the Haute-Garonne department
