= Mondavezan =

- Commune
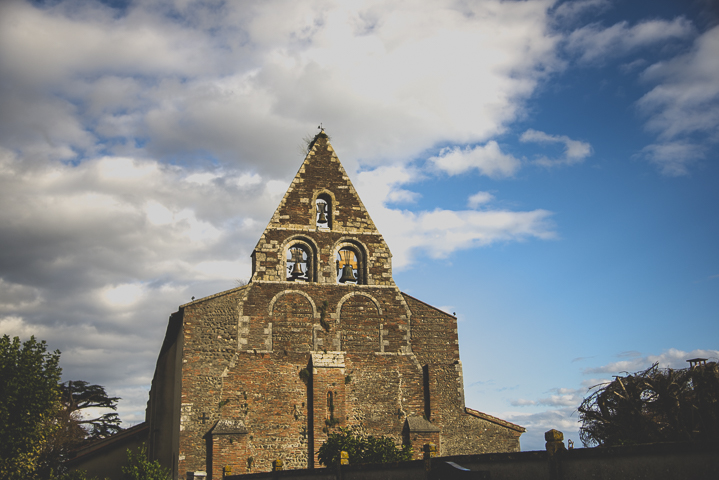
- Church of Saint-Michel, in the centre of Mondavezan
- Location of Mondavezan
- Location within France Location within Occitanie
- Coordinates: 43°14′25″N 1°02′07″E
- Country: France
- Region: Occitania
- Department: Haute-Garonne
- Arrondissement: Muret
- Canton: Cazères

Government
  - Mayor (2020–2026): Jacques Gros
- Area^{1}: 21.09 km^{2} (8.14 sq mi)
- Elevation: 300 m (980 ft)
- Highest elevation: 374 m (1,227 ft)
- Lowest elevation: 252 m (827 ft)
- Population (2023): 880
  - Density: 42/km^{2} (110/sq mi)
- Time zone: UTC+01:00 (CET)
  - Summer (DST): UTC+02:00 (CEST)
- INSEE/Postal code: 31349 /31220
- ^{1} French Land Register data, which excludes lakes, ponds, glaciers > 1 km^{2} (0.386 sq mi or 247 acres) and river estuaries.

Mondavezan (French pronunciation: [mɔ̃davzɑ̃]; Occitan: Montdavesan) is a commune in the Haute-Garonne department in southwestern France.

== Population ==
Historical population
Year	Pop.	±% p.a.
1968	487	—
1975	466	−0.63%
1982	485	+0.57%
1990	554	+1.68%
1999	643	+1.67%
2007	757	+2.06%
2012	847	+2.27%
2017	905	+1.33%
2023	880	−0.47%
Source: INSEE

== See also ==
- Communes of the Haute-Garonne department
