= Saint-Christaud, Haute-Garonne =

Saint-Christaud
- Commune
- Location of Saint-Christaud
- Location within France Location within Occitanie
- Coordinates: 43°11′25″N 1°07′47″E
- Country: France
- Region: Occitania
- Department: Haute-Garonne
- Arrondissement: Muret
- Canton: Auterive
- Intercommunality: Volvestre

Government
  - Mayor (2024–2026): Eric Déga
- Area^{1}: 10.87 km^{2} (4.20 sq mi)
- Elevation: 372 m (1,220 ft)
- Highest elevation: 394 m (1,293 ft)
- Lowest elevation: 225 m (738 ft)
- Population (2023): 235
  - Density: 21.6/km^{2} (56.0/sq mi)
- Time zone: UTC+01:00 (CET)
  - Summer (DST): UTC+02:00 (CEST)
- INSEE/Postal code: 31474 /31310
- ^{1} French Land Register data, which excludes lakes, ponds, glaciers > 1 km^{2} (0.386 sq mi or 247 acres) and river estuaries.

Saint-Christaud (French pronunciation: [sɛ̃ kʁisto]; Occitan: Sent Cristau) is a commune in the Haute-Garonne department in southwestern France.

== Population ==
Historical population
Year	Pop.	±% p.a.
1968	204	—
1975	181	−1.69%
1982	199	+1.36%
1990	223	+1.43%
1999	229	+0.30%
2007	252	+1.20%
2012	257	+0.39%
2017	244	−1.03%
2023	235	−0.62%
Source: INSEE

== See also ==
- Communes of the Haute-Garonne department
