= Louge =

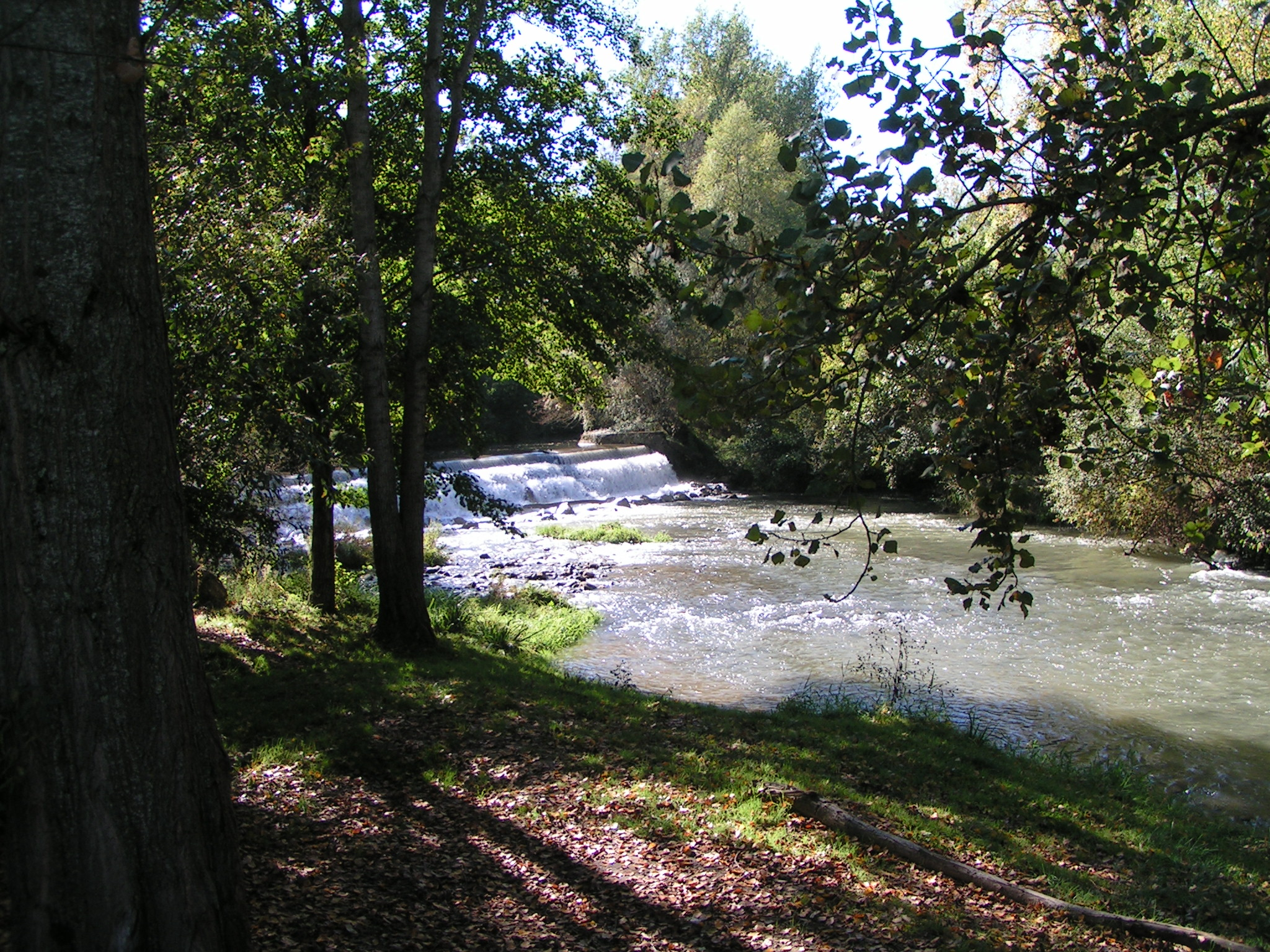

- Location within France Location within Occitanie

Location
- Country: France

Physical characteristics
- Source
  - location: Plateau de Lannemezan
- Mouth
  - location: Garonne
  - coordinates: 43°27′43″N 1°19′58″E
  - elevation: 165 m (541 ft)
- Length: 100.0 km (62.1 mi)
- Basin size: 486 km^{2} (188 sq mi)
- Discharge
  - average: 6.14 m^{3}/s (217 cu ft/s)

Basin features
- Progression: Garonne→ Gironde estuary→ Atlantic Ocean

The Louge (French pronunciation: [luʒ]; Occitan: Loja) is a 100.0 km (62.1 mi) long river in southwestern France, left tributary of the Garonne. Its source is in the département of Hautes-Pyrénées, near Lannemezan.

It flows generally north-northeast through the following départements and towns:

- Hautes-Pyrénées:
- Haute-Garonne: Le Fousseret, Peyssies, Lavernose-Lacasse, Muret.

It flows into the Garonne at Muret.
