= Gratens =

- Commune
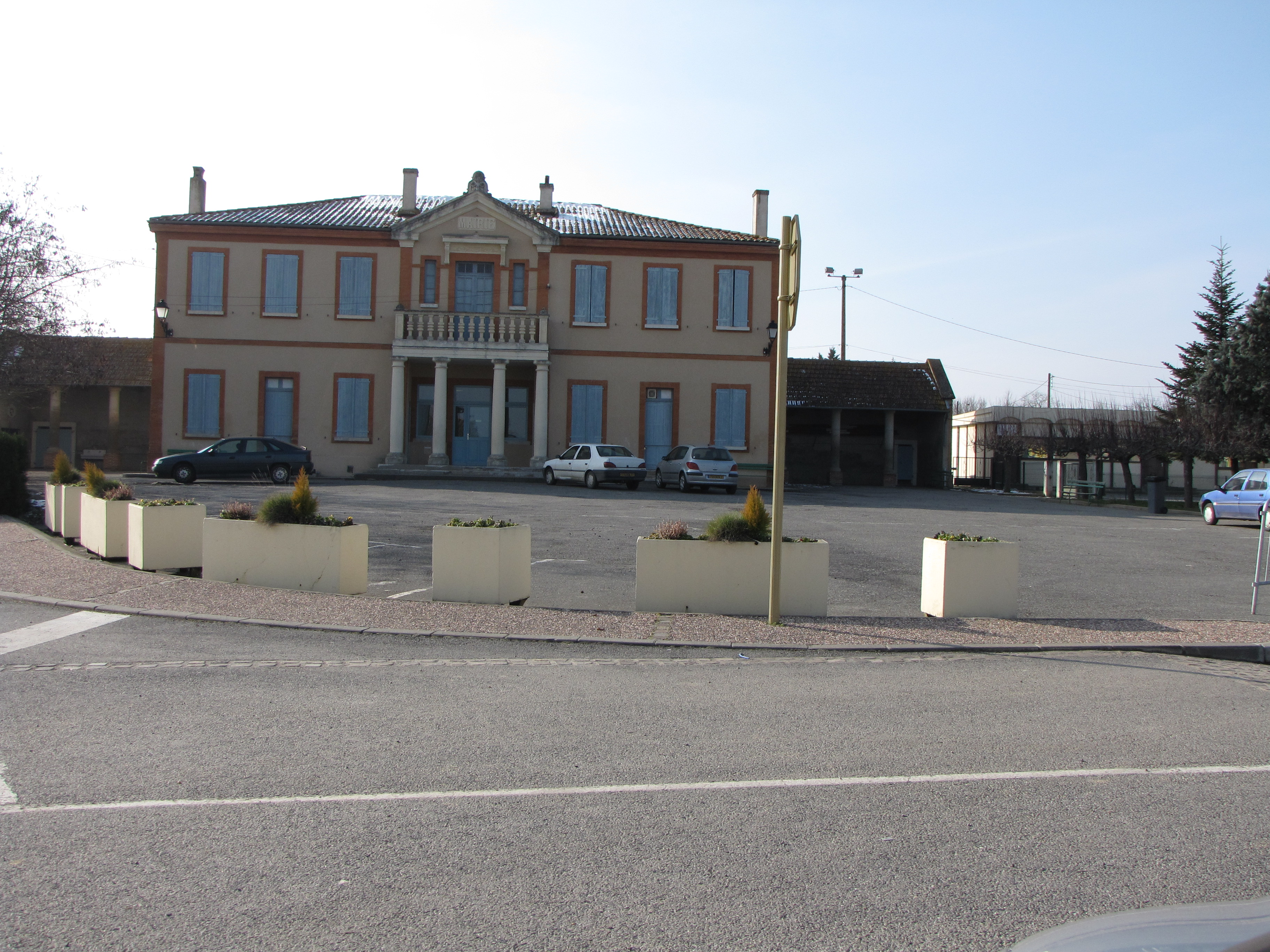
- Town hall
- Location of Gratens
- Location within France Location within Occitanie
- Coordinates: 43°19′18″N 1°06′53″E
- Country: France
- Region: Occitania
- Department: Haute-Garonne
- Arrondissement: Muret
- Canton: Cazères

Government
  - Mayor (2020–2026): Alain Dutrey
- Area^{1}: 15.15 km^{2} (5.85 sq mi)
- Elevation: 283 m (928 ft)
- Highest elevation: 344 m (1,129 ft)
- Lowest elevation: 221 m (725 ft)
- Population (2023): 805
  - Density: 53.1/km^{2} (138/sq mi)
- Time zone: UTC+01:00 (CET)
  - Summer (DST): UTC+02:00 (CEST)
- INSEE/Postal code: 31229 /31430
- ^{1} French Land Register data, which excludes lakes, ponds, glaciers > 1 km^{2} (0.386 sq mi or 247 acres) and river estuaries.

Gratens (French pronunciation: [ɡʁatɛ̃s]) is a commune in the Haute-Garonne department in southwestern France.

== Population ==
Historical population
Year	Pop.	±% p.a.
1968	422	—
1975	366	−2.01%
1982	372	+0.23%
1990	426	+1.71%
1999	445	+0.49%
2007	646	+4.77%
2012	671	+0.76%
2017	684	+0.38%
2023	805	+2.75%
Source: INSEE

== See also ==
- Communes of the Haute-Garonne department
