= Caujac =

- Commune
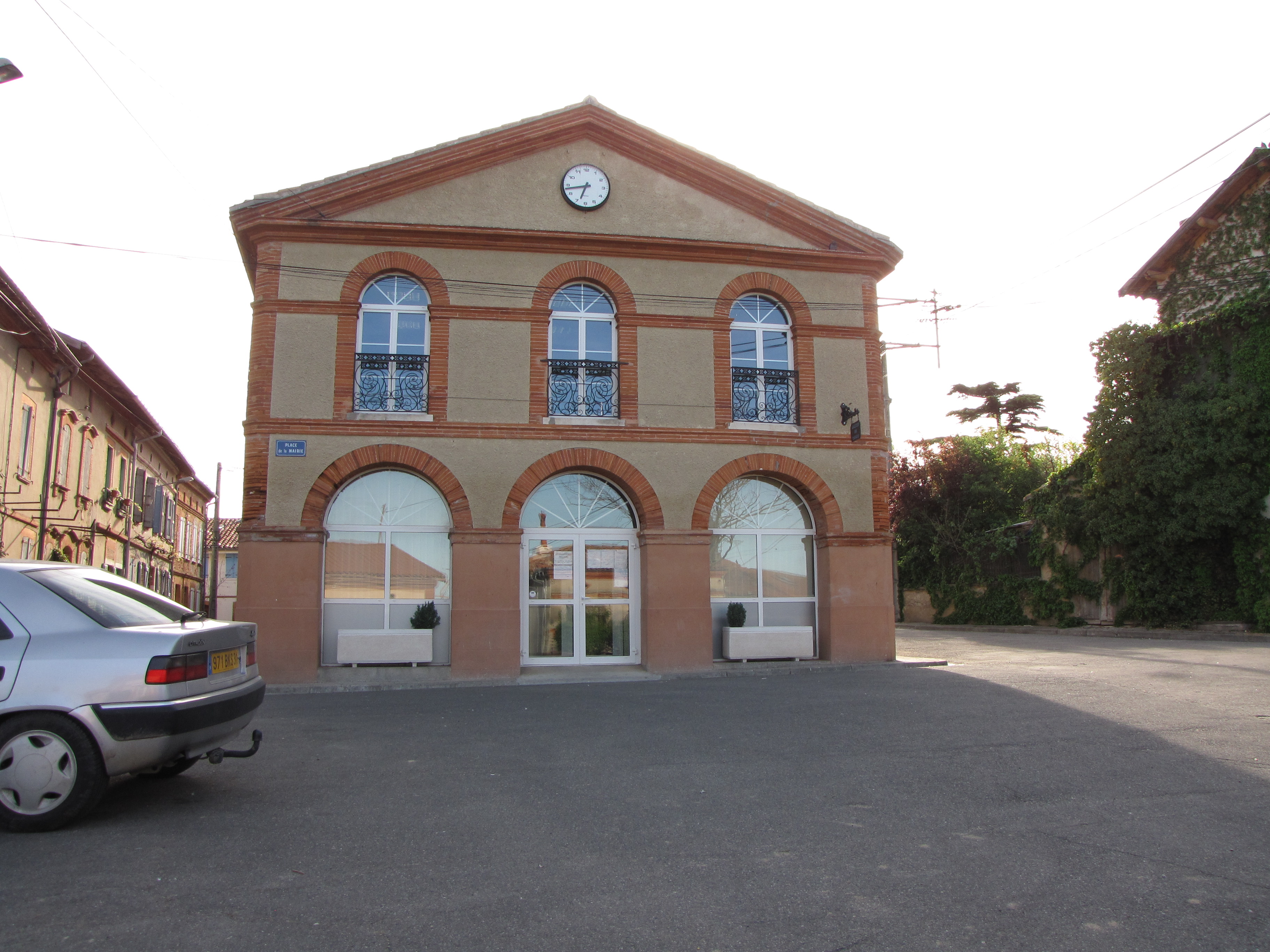
- Town hall

- Coat of arms
- Location of Caujac
- Location within France Location within Occitanie
- Coordinates: 43°17′59″N 1°28′08″E
- Country: France
- Region: Occitania
- Department: Haute-Garonne
- Arrondissement: Muret
- Canton: Auterive

Government
  - Mayor (2020–2026): Émilie Freyche
- Area^{1}: 10.82 km^{2} (4.18 sq mi)
- Elevation: 221 m (725 ft)
- Highest elevation: 334 m (1,096 ft)
- Lowest elevation: 197 m (646 ft)
- Population (2023): 869
  - Density: 80.3/km^{2} (208/sq mi)
- Time zone: UTC+01:00 (CET)
  - Summer (DST): UTC+02:00 (CEST)
- INSEE/Postal code: 31128 /31190
- ^{1} French Land Register data, which excludes lakes, ponds, glaciers > 1 km^{2} (0.386 sq mi or 247 acres) and river estuaries.

Caujac (French pronunciation: [koʒak]) is a commune in the Haute-Garonne department in southwestern France.

== Geography ==
The commune is bordered by five other communes: Auterive to the north, Grazac to the northwest, Esperce to the west, Cintegabelle to the east, and Gaillac-Toulza to the south.

== History ==
Caujac was part of the zone libre during World War II, which was occupied by Nazi Germany from 1942 until southern France was liberated in August 1944.

== Population ==
Historical population
Year	Pop.	±% p.a.
1968	343	—
1975	315	−1.21%
1982	324	+0.40%
1990	373	+1.78%
1999	437	+1.78%
2007	515	+2.07%
2012	848	+10.49%
2017	837	−0.26%
2023	869	+0.63%
Source: INSEE

== See also ==
- Communes of the Haute-Garonne department
