= Mauressac =

- Commune
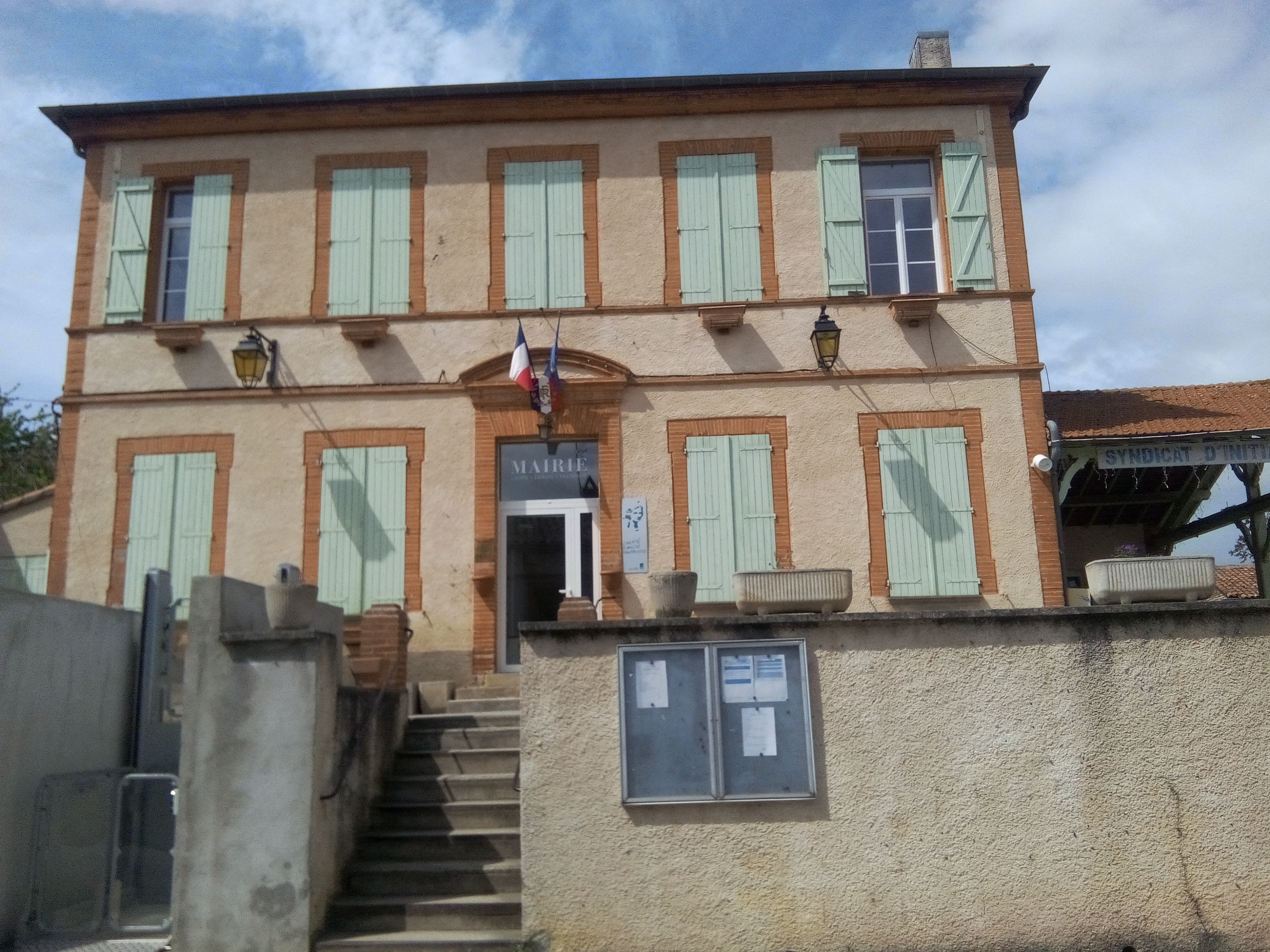
- The town hall in Mauressac
- Location of Mauressac
- Location within France Location within Occitanie
- Coordinates: 43°19′30″N 1°26′09″E
- Country: France
- Region: Occitania
- Department: Haute-Garonne
- Arrondissement: Muret
- Canton: Auterive

Government
  - Mayor (2020–2026): Wilfrid Pasquet
- Area^{1}: 4.52 km^{2} (1.75 sq mi)
- Elevation: 230 m (750 ft)
- Highest elevation: 312 m (1,024 ft)
- Lowest elevation: 191 m (627 ft)
- Population (2023): 492
  - Density: 109/km^{2} (282/sq mi)
- Time zone: UTC+01:00 (CET)
  - Summer (DST): UTC+02:00 (CEST)
- INSEE/Postal code: 31330 /31190
- ^{1} French Land Register data, which excludes lakes, ponds, glaciers > 1 km^{2} (0.386 sq mi or 247 acres) and river estuaries.

Mauressac (French pronunciation: [moʁesak]) is a commune in the Haute-Garonne department in southwestern France.

== Geography ==
The commune is bordered by four communes: Auterive to the northeast, Grazac to the southeast, Esperce to the southwest, and finally by Puydaniel to the northwest.

== Population ==
Historical population
Year	Pop.	±% p.a.
1968	107	—
1975	91	−2.29%
1982	120	+4.03%
1990	184	+5.49%
1999	240	+3.00%
2007	360	+5.20%
2012	481	+5.97%
2017	518	+1.49%
2023	492	−0.85%
Source: INSEE

== See also ==
- Communes of the Haute-Garonne department
