= Esperce =

- Commune
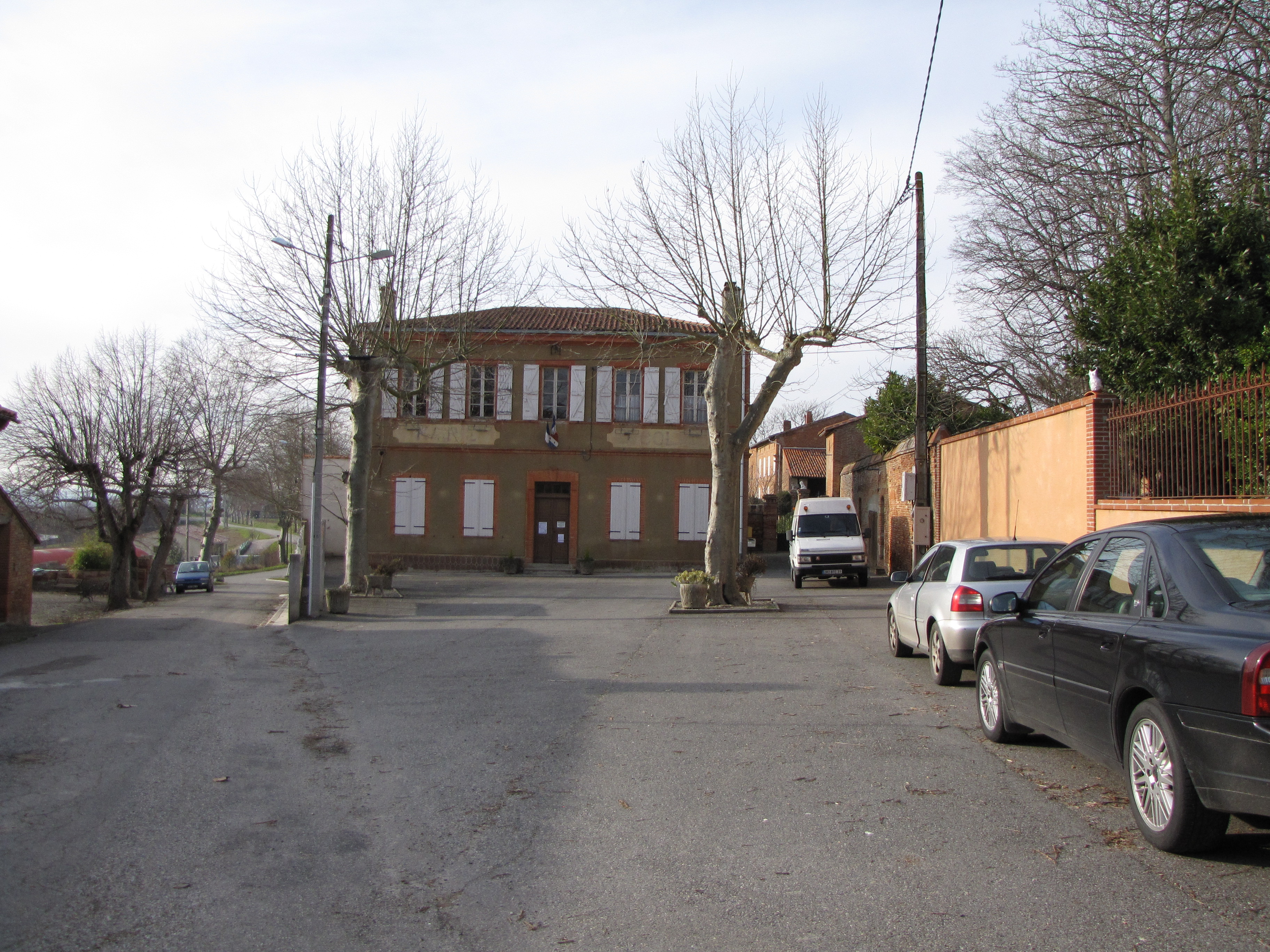
- Town hall

- Coat of arms
- Location of Esperce
- Location within France Location within Occitanie
- Coordinates: 43°17′51″N 1°24′07″E
- Country: France
- Region: Occitania
- Department: Haute-Garonne
- Arrondissement: Muret
- Canton: Auterive

Government
  - Mayor (2024–2026): Sandrine Barthe
- Area^{1}: 16.42 km^{2} (6.34 sq mi)
- Elevation: 321 m (1,053 ft)
- Highest elevation: 334 m (1,096 ft)
- Lowest elevation: 216 m (709 ft)
- Population (2023): 296
  - Density: 18.0/km^{2} (46.7/sq mi)
- Time zone: UTC+01:00 (CET)
  - Summer (DST): UTC+02:00 (CEST)
- INSEE/Postal code: 31173 /31190
- ^{1} French Land Register data, which excludes lakes, ponds, glaciers > 1 km^{2} (0.386 sq mi or 247 acres) and river estuaries.

Esperce (French pronunciation: [ɛspɛʁs]; Occitan: Espèrça) is a commune in the Haute-Garonne department in southwestern France.

== Geography ==
The commune is bordered by eight other communes, seven of them is in Haute-Garonne, and one of them is in Ariège: Lagrâce-Dieu to the north, Puydaniel and Mauressac to the northeast, Grazac to the east, Saint-Sulpice-sur-Lèze to the northwest, Gaillac-Toulza to the south, and finally by the department of Ariège to the southwest by the commune of Lézat-sur-Lèze to the southwest.

== Population ==
Historical population
Year	Pop.	±% p.a.
1968	220	—
1975	201	−1.28%
1982	176	−1.88%
1990	186	+0.69%
1999	210	+1.36%
2007	236	+1.47%
2012	248	+1.00%
2017	259	+0.87%
2023	296	+2.25%
Source: INSEE

== See also ==
- Communes of the Haute-Garonne department
