= Grazac, Haute-Garonne =

Grazac
- Commune
- Location of Grazac
- Location within France Location within Occitanie
- Coordinates: 43°18′45″N 1°27′22″E
- Country: France
- Region: Occitania
- Department: Haute-Garonne
- Arrondissement: Muret
- Canton: Auterive

Government
  - Mayor (2020–2026): Michel Zdan
- Area^{1}: 7.17 km^{2} (2.77 sq mi)
- Elevation: 245 m (804 ft)
- Highest elevation: 333 m (1,093 ft)
- Lowest elevation: 194 m (636 ft)
- Population (2023): 816
  - Density: 114/km^{2} (295/sq mi)
- Time zone: UTC+01:00 (CET)
  - Summer (DST): UTC+02:00 (CEST)
- INSEE/Postal code: 31231 /31190
- ^{1} French Land Register data, which excludes lakes, ponds, glaciers > 1 km^{2} (0.386 sq mi or 247 acres) and river estuaries.

Grazac (French pronunciation: [ɡʁazak]; Occitan: Grasac) is a commune in the Haute-Garonne department in southwestern France.

== Geography ==
The commune is bordered by four other communes: Auterive to the northeast, Caujac to the southeast, Esperce to the southwest, and finally by Mauressac to the northwest.

== Population ==
Historical population
Year	Pop.	±% p.a.
1968	125	—
1975	135	+1.11%
1982	210	+6.52%
1990	366	+7.19%
1999	442	+2.12%
2007	493	+1.37%
2012	522	+1.15%
2017	587	+2.37%
2023	816	+5.64%
Source: INSEE

== See also ==
- Communes of the Haute-Garonne department
