= Puydaniel =

- Commune
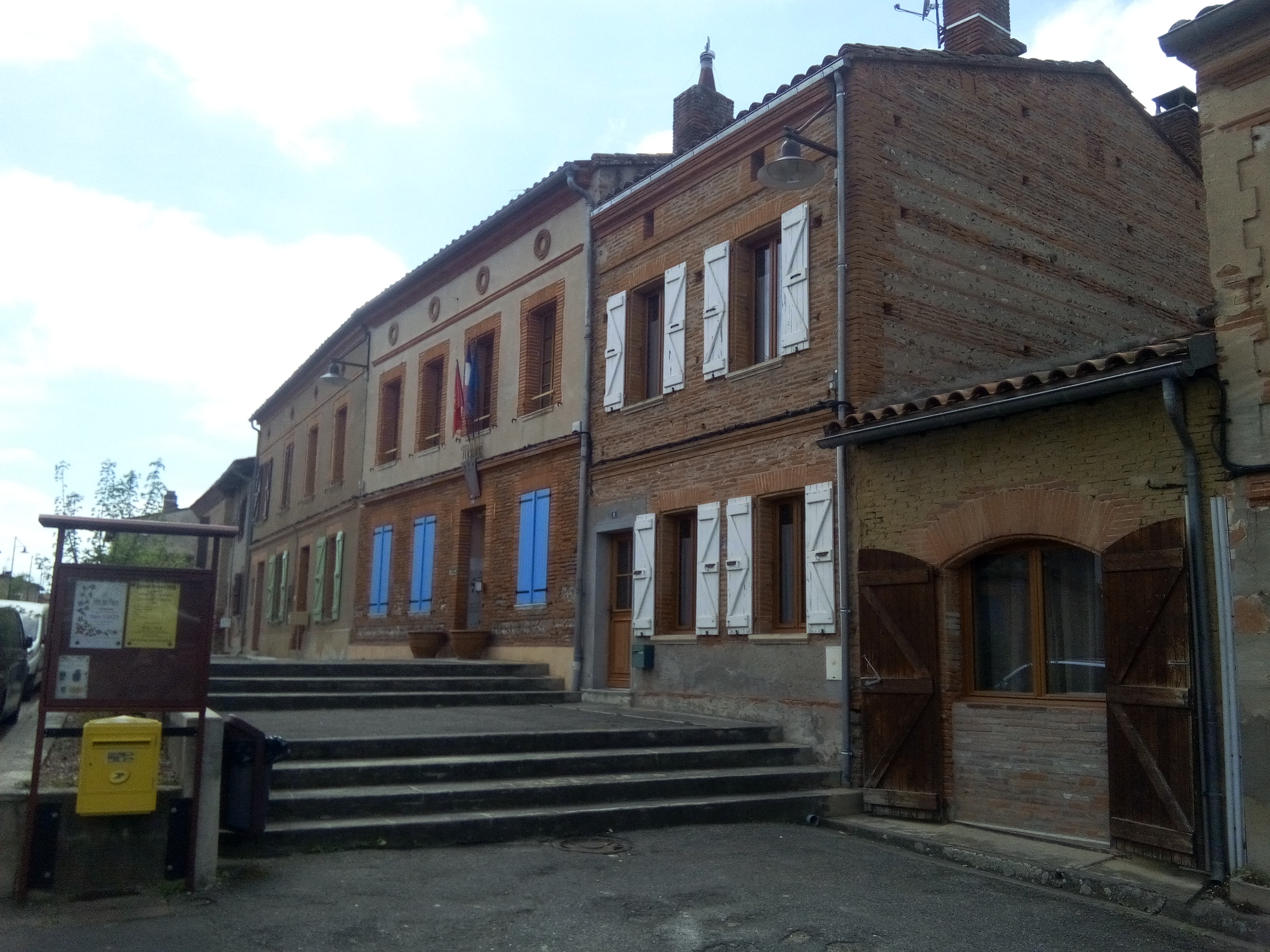
- The town hall in Puydaniel

- Coat of arms
- Location of Puydaniel
- Location within France Location within Occitanie
- Coordinates: 43°20′13″N 1°26′00″E
- Country: France
- Region: Occitania
- Department: Haute-Garonne
- Arrondissement: Muret
- Canton: Auterive

Government
  - Mayor (2020–2026): Jean-Claude Blanc
- Area^{1}: 7.38 km^{2} (2.85 sq mi)
- Elevation: 205 m (673 ft)
- Highest elevation: 322 m (1,056 ft)
- Lowest elevation: 187 m (614 ft)
- Population (2023): 575
  - Density: 77.9/km^{2} (202/sq mi)
- Time zone: UTC+01:00 (CET)
  - Summer (DST): UTC+02:00 (CEST)
- INSEE/Postal code: 31442 /31190
- ^{1} French Land Register data, which excludes lakes, ponds, glaciers > 1 km^{2} (0.386 sq mi or 247 acres) and river estuaries.

Puydaniel (French pronunciation: [pɥidanjɛl]; Occitan: Puègdanièl) is a commune in the Haute-Garonne department in southwestern France.

== Population ==
Historical population
Year	Pop.	±% p.a.
1968	192	—
1975	231	+2.68%
1982	273	+2.42%
1990	294	+0.93%
1999	318	+0.88%
2007	385	+2.42%
2012	436	+2.52%
2017	518	+3.51%
2023	575	+1.76%
Source: INSEE

== See also ==
- Communes of the Haute-Garonne department
