= Cazeaux =

Cazeau or Cazeaux may refer to:

== Places ==
- Cazeaux-de-Larboust, a commune in Haute-Garonne, France
- Cazeau River, north shore tributary of the Saint Lawrence river, in Château-Richer, La Côte-de-Beaupré Regional County Municipality, Capitale-Nationale, Quebec, Canada

== Surname ==
- Cyril Cazeaux (born 1995), rugby player
