= Moncaup =

Moncaup is the name of the following communes in France:

- Moncaup, Haute-Garonne, in the Haute-Garonne department
- Moncaup, Pyrénées-Atlantiques, in the Pyrénées-Atlantiques department
