= Escoulis =

- Commune
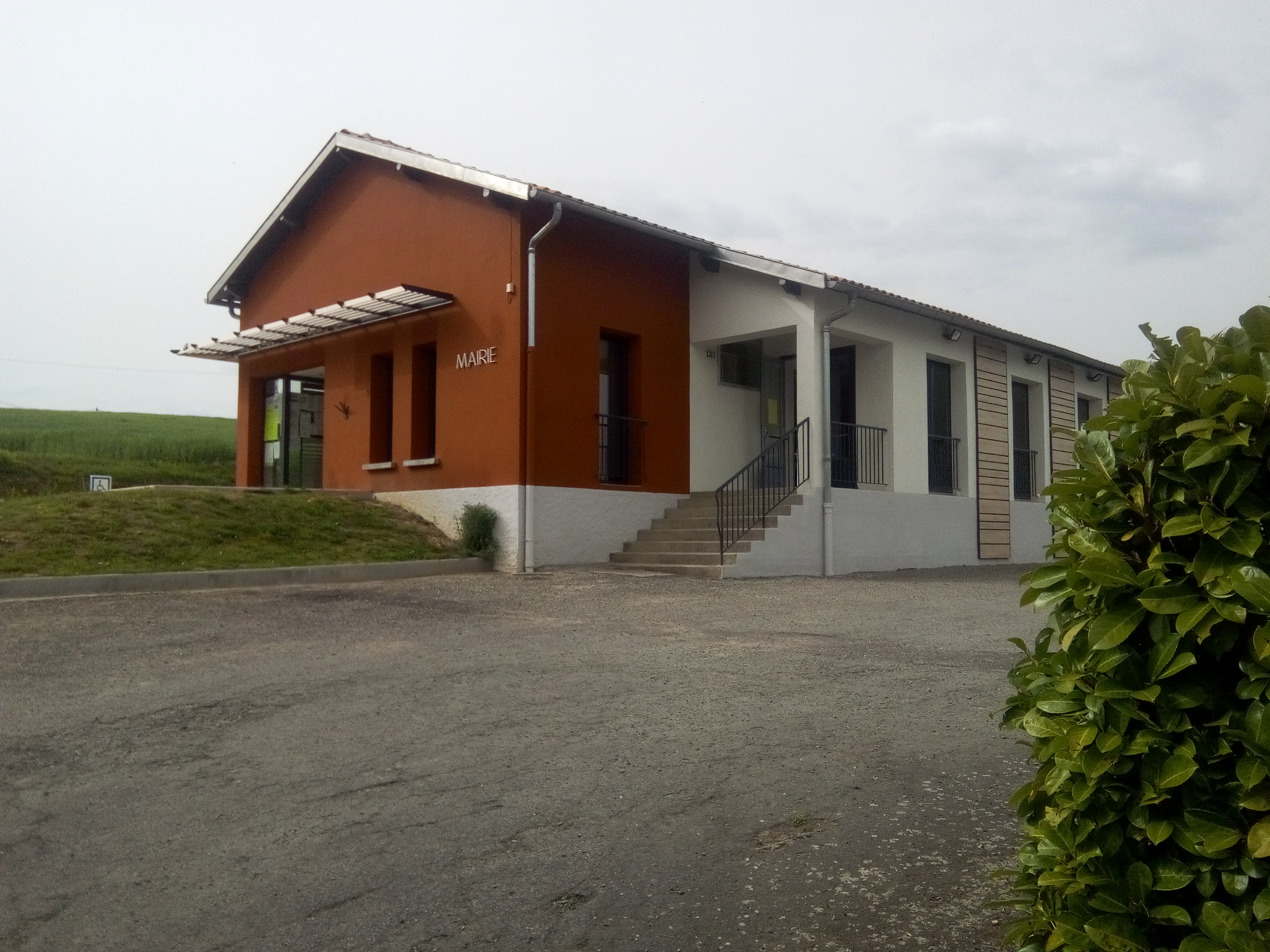
- The town hall in Escoulis
- Location of Escoulis
- Location within France Location within Occitanie
- Coordinates: 43°06′45″N 1°01′53″E
- Country: France
- Region: Occitania
- Department: Haute-Garonne
- Arrondissement: Saint-Gaudens
- Canton: Bagnères-de-Luchon
- Intercommunality: Cagire Garonne Salat

Government
  - Mayor (2020–2026): Jacques Soumet
- Area^{1}: 4.64 km^{2} (1.79 sq mi)
- Elevation: 407 m (1,335 ft)
- Highest elevation: 410 m (1,350 ft)
- Lowest elevation: 298 m (978 ft)
- Population (2023): 76
  - Density: 16/km^{2} (42/sq mi)
- Time zone: UTC+01:00 (CET)
  - Summer (DST): UTC+02:00 (CEST)
- INSEE/Postal code: 31591 /31260
- ^{1} French Land Register data, which excludes lakes, ponds, glaciers > 1 km^{2} (0.386 sq mi or 247 acres) and river estuaries.

Escoulis (Occitan: Scoulis) is a commune in the Haute-Garonne department in southwestern France. It was created in 1952 from part of the commune Belbèze-en-Comminges.

== Population ==
Historical population
Year	Pop.	±% p.a.
1968	106	—
1975	107	+0.13%
1982	106	−0.13%
1990	88	−2.30%
1999	77	−1.47%
2007	72	−0.84%
2012	88	+4.10%
2017	80	−1.89%
2023	76	−0.85%
Source: INSEE

== See also ==
- Communes of the Haute-Garonne department
