= Caubous =

Caubous is the name of the following communes in France:

- Caubous, Haute-Garonne, in the Haute-Garonne department
- Caubous, Hautes-Pyrénées, in the Hautes-Pyrénées department
