= Cier-de-Luchon =

- Commune
- Location of Cier-de-Luchon
- Location within France Location within Occitanie
- Coordinates: 42°51′33″N 0°36′07″E
- Country: France
- Region: Occitania
- Department: Haute-Garonne
- Arrondissement: Saint-Gaudens
- Canton: Bagnères-de-Luchon

Government
  - Mayor (2020–2026): Jean-Pierre Comet
- Area^{1}: 10.59 km^{2} (4.09 sq mi)
- Elevation: 600 m (2,000 ft)
- Highest elevation: 1,988 m (6,522 ft)
- Lowest elevation: 582 m (1,909 ft)
- Population (2023): 235
  - Density: 22.2/km^{2} (57.5/sq mi)
- Time zone: UTC+01:00 (CET)
  - Summer (DST): UTC+02:00 (CEST)
- INSEE/Postal code: 31142 /31110
- ^{1} French Land Register data, which excludes lakes, ponds, glaciers > 1 km^{2} (0.386 sq mi or 247 acres) and river estuaries.

Cier-de-Luchon (French pronunciation: [sje də lyʃɔ̃]; Occitan: Cièr de Luishon) is a commune in the Haute-Garonne department in southwestern France.

== Population ==
Historical population
Year	Pop.	±% p.a.
1968	127	—
1975	124	−0.34%
1982	120	−0.47%
1990	185	+5.56%
1999	222	+2.05%
2007	246	+1.29%
2012	243	−0.25%
2017	248	+0.41%
2023	235	−0.89%
Source: INSEE

== See also ==
- Communes of the Haute-Garonne department
