= Ardiège =

- Commune
- Location of Ardiège
- Location within France Location within Occitanie
- Coordinates: 43°04′14″N 0°38′36″E
- Country: France
- Region: Occitania
- Department: Haute-Garonne
- Arrondissement: Saint-Gaudens
- Canton: Bagnères-de-Luchon

Government
  - Mayor (2020–2026): Dominique Berre
- Area^{1}: 3.76 km^{2} (1.45 sq mi)
- Elevation: 400 m (1,300 ft)
- Highest elevation: 710 m (2,330 ft)
- Lowest elevation: 405 m (1,329 ft)
- Population (2023): 381
  - Density: 101/km^{2} (262/sq mi)
- Time zone: UTC+01:00 (CET)
  - Summer (DST): UTC+02:00 (CEST)
- INSEE/Postal code: 31013 /31210
- ^{1} French Land Register data, which excludes lakes, ponds, glaciers > 1 km^{2} (0.386 sq mi or 247 acres) and river estuaries.

Ardiège (French pronunciation: [aʁdjɛʒ]; Occitan: Ardièja) is a commune in the Haute-Garonne department in southwestern France.

== Population ==
Historical population
Year	Pop.	±% p.a.
1968	246	—
1975	261	+0.85%
1982	247	−0.78%
1990	259	+0.59%
1999	325	+2.55%
2007	408	+2.88%
2012	367	−2.10%
2017	364	−0.16%
2023	381	+0.76%
Source: INSEE

== See also ==
- Communes of the Haute-Garonne department
