= Soueich =

- Commune
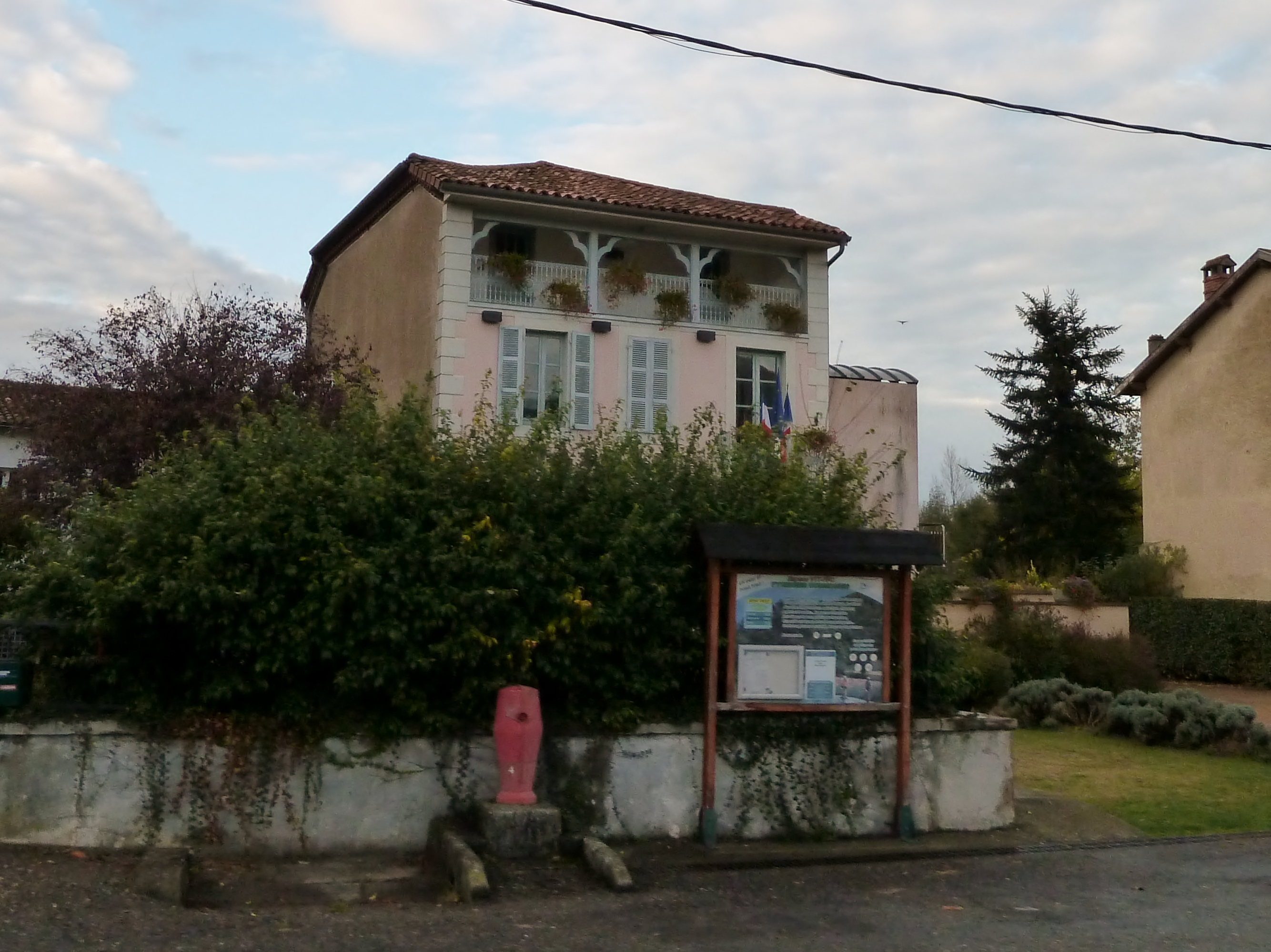
- The town hall in Soueich
- Location of Soueich
- Location within France Location within Occitanie
- Coordinates: 43°02′54″N 0°46′51″E
- Country: France
- Region: Occitania
- Department: Haute-Garonne
- Arrondissement: Saint-Gaudens
- Canton: Bagnères-de-Luchon

Government
  - Mayor (2020–2026): Brigitte Segard
- Area^{1}: 11.33 km^{2} (4.37 sq mi)
- Elevation: 386 m (1,266 ft)
- Highest elevation: 700 m (2,300 ft)
- Lowest elevation: 360 m (1,180 ft)
- Population (2023): 514
  - Density: 45.4/km^{2} (117/sq mi)
- Time zone: UTC+01:00 (CET)
  - Summer (DST): UTC+02:00 (CEST)
- INSEE/Postal code: 31550 /31160
- ^{1} French Land Register data, which excludes lakes, ponds, glaciers > 1 km^{2} (0.386 sq mi or 247 acres) and river estuaries.

Soueich (French pronunciation: [swɛʃ]; Occitan: Soeish) is a commune in the Haute-Garonne department in southwestern France.

== Population ==
Historical population
Year	Pop.	±% p.a.
1968	539	—
1975	483	−1.55%
1982	467	−0.48%
1990	502	+0.91%
1999	501	−0.02%
2007	525	+0.59%
2012	560	+1.30%
2017	531	−1.06%
2023	514	−0.54%
Source: INSEE

== See also ==
- Communes of the Haute-Garonne department
