= Herran =

Commune in Haute-Garonne, Frances

- Commune
- Location of Herran
- Location within France Location within Occitanie
- Coordinates: 42°58′24″N 0°54′53″E
- Country: France
- Region: Occitania
- Department: Haute-Garonne
- Arrondissement: Saint-Gaudens
- Canton: Bagnères-de-Luchon

Government
  - Mayor (2020–2026): Nathalie Augustin-Rouch
- Area^{1}: 15.37 km^{2} (5.93 sq mi)
- Elevation: 800 m (2,600 ft)
- Highest elevation: 1,574 m (5,164 ft)
- Lowest elevation: 520 m (1,710 ft)
- Population (2023): 74
  - Density: 4.8/km^{2} (12/sq mi)
- Time zone: UTC+01:00 (CET)
  - Summer (DST): UTC+02:00 (CEST)
- INSEE/Postal code: 31236 /31160
- ^{1} French Land Register data, which excludes lakes, ponds, glaciers > 1 km^{2} (0.386 sq mi or 247 acres) and river estuaries.

Herran (French pronunciation: [ɛʁɑ̃]) is a commune in the Haute-Garonne department in southwestern France.

== Population ==
Historical population
Year	Pop.	±% p.a.
1968	90	—
1975	94	+0.62%
1982	106	+1.73%
1990	71	−4.89%
1999	81	+1.47%
2007	74	−1.12%
2012	70	−1.11%
2017	75	+1.39%
2023	74	−0.22%
Source: INSEE

== See also ==
- Communes of the Haute-Garonne department
