= Laffite-Toupière =

Commune in Occitanie, France

- Commune
- Location of Laffite-Toupière
- Location within France Location within Occitanie
- Coordinates: 43°09′55″N 0°54′23″E
- Country: France
- Region: Occitania
- Department: Haute-Garonne
- Arrondissement: Saint-Gaudens
- Canton: Bagnères-de-Luchon
- Intercommunality: Cagire Garonne Salat

Government
  - Mayor (2020–2026): Jean-Claude Roubichou
- Area^{1}: 4.84 km^{2} (1.87 sq mi)
- Elevation: 385 m (1,263 ft)
- Highest elevation: 482 m (1,581 ft)
- Lowest elevation: 289 m (948 ft)
- Population (2023): 98
  - Density: 20/km^{2} (52/sq mi)
- Time zone: UTC+01:00 (CET)
  - Summer (DST): UTC+02:00 (CEST)
- INSEE/Postal code: 31260 /31360
- ^{1} French Land Register data, which excludes lakes, ponds, glaciers > 1 km^{2} (0.386 sq mi or 247 acres) and river estuaries.

Laffite-Toupière (French pronunciation: [lafit tupjɛʁ]; Occitan: Era Hita Topièra) is a commune in the Haute-Garonne department in southwestern France.

== Population ==
Historical population
Year	Pop.	±% p.a.
1968	93	—
1975	76	−2.84%
1982	80	+0.74%
1990	81	+0.16%
1999	70	−1.61%
2007	78	+1.36%
2012	91	+3.13%
2017	103	+2.51%
2023	98	−0.83%
Source: INSEE

== See also ==
Communes of the Haute-Garonne department
