= Bachos =

- Commune
- Location of Bachos
- Location within France Location within Occitanie
- Coordinates: 42°53′56″N 0°37′06″E
- Country: France
- Region: Occitania
- Department: Haute-Garonne
- Arrondissement: Saint-Gaudens
- Canton: Bagnères-de-Luchon
- Intercommunality: Pyrénées Haut-Garonnaises

Government
  - Mayor (2020–2026): Gabriel Pelayo
- Area^{1}: 2.67 km^{2} (1.03 sq mi)
- Elevation: 700 m (2,300 ft)
- Highest elevation: 1,600 m (5,200 ft)
- Lowest elevation: 520 m (1,710 ft)
- Population (2023): 31
  - Density: 12/km^{2} (30/sq mi)
- Time zone: UTC+01:00 (CET)
  - Summer (DST): UTC+02:00 (CEST)
- INSEE/Postal code: 31040 /31440
- ^{1} French Land Register data, which excludes lakes, ponds, glaciers > 1 km^{2} (0.386 sq mi or 247 acres) and river estuaries.

Bachos is a commune in the Haute-Garonne department in southwestern France.

== Population ==
Historical population
Year	Pop.	±% p.a.
1968	51	—
1975	48	−0.86%
1982	39	−2.92%
1990	45	+1.80%
1999	38	−1.86%
2007	27	−4.18%
2012	29	+1.44%
2017	38	+5.55%
2023	31	−3.34%
Source: INSEE

== See also ==
- Communes of the Haute-Garonne department
