= Saccourvielle =

- Commune
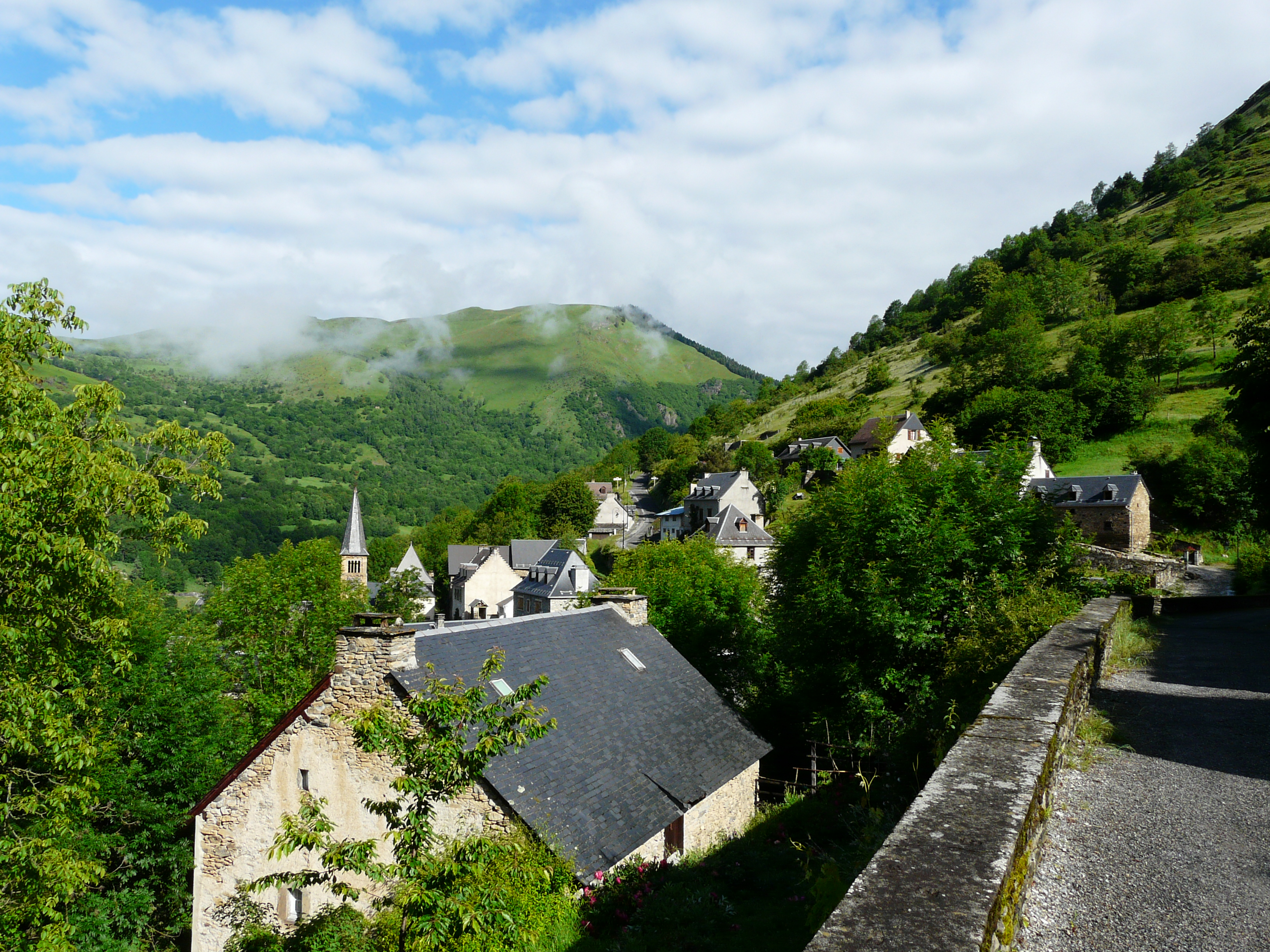
- A general view of Saccourvielle
- Location of Saccourvielle
- Location within France Location within Occitanie
- Coordinates: 42°48′59″N 0°33′46″E
- Country: France
- Region: Occitania
- Department: Haute-Garonne
- Arrondissement: Saint-Gaudens
- Canton: Bagnères-de-Luchon
- Intercommunality: Pyrénées Haut-Garonnaises

Government
  - Mayor (2020–2026): Clément Garcia
- Area^{1}: 3.41 km^{2} (1.32 sq mi)
- Elevation: 860 m (2,820 ft)
- Highest elevation: 1,781 m (5,843 ft)
- Lowest elevation: 833 m (2,733 ft)
- Population (2023): 22
  - Density: 6.5/km^{2} (17/sq mi)
- Time zone: UTC+01:00 (CET)
  - Summer (DST): UTC+02:00 (CEST)
- INSEE/Postal code: 31465 /31110
- ^{1} French Land Register data, which excludes lakes, ponds, glaciers > 1 km^{2} (0.386 sq mi or 247 acres) and river estuaries.

Saccourvielle (French pronunciation: [sakuʁvjɛl]; Occitan: Sacorvièla) is a commune in the Haute-Garonne department in southwestern France.

== Population ==
Historical population
Year	Pop.	±% p.a.
1968	21	—
1975	13	−6.62%
1982	10	−3.68%
1990	16	+6.05%
1999	14	−1.47%
2007	12	−1.91%
2012	14	+3.13%
2017	15	+1.39%
2023	22	+6.59%
Source: INSEE

== See also ==
- Communes of the Haute-Garonne department
