= Cathervielle =

- Commune
- Location of Cathervielle
- Location within France Location within Occitanie
- Coordinates: 42°48′44″N 0°30′25″E
- Country: France
- Region: Occitania
- Department: Haute-Garonne
- Arrondissement: Saint-Gaudens
- Canton: Bagnères-de-Luchon

Government
  - Mayor (2020–2026): Christian Emportes
- Area^{1}: 3.7 km^{2} (1.4 sq mi)
- Elevation: 1,152 m (3,780 ft)
- Highest elevation: 1,918 m (6,293 ft)
- Lowest elevation: 1,152 m (3,780 ft)
- Population (2023): 28
  - Density: 7.6/km^{2} (20/sq mi)
- Time zone: UTC+01:00 (CET)
  - Summer (DST): UTC+02:00 (CEST)
- INSEE/Postal code: 31125 /31110
- ^{1} French Land Register data, which excludes lakes, ponds, glaciers > 1 km^{2} (0.386 sq mi or 247 acres) and river estuaries.

Cathervielle (French pronunciation: [katɛʁvjɛl]; Occitan: Catervièla) is a commune in the Haute-Garonne department in southwestern France.

== Population ==
Historical population
Year	Pop.	±% p.a.
1968	34	—
1975	23	−5.43%
1982	30	+3.87%
1990	33	+1.20%
1999	30	−1.05%
2007	35	+1.95%
2012	36	+0.57%
2017	36	+0.00%
2023	28	−4.10%
Source: INSEE

== See also ==
- Communes of the Haute-Garonne department
