= Baren, Haute-Garonne =

Baren
- Commune
- Location of Baren
- Location within France Location within Occitanie
- Coordinates: 42°52′12″N 0°37′11″E
- Country: France
- Region: Occitania
- Department: Haute-Garonne
- Arrondissement: Saint-Gaudens
- Canton: Bagnères-de-Luchon
- Intercommunality: Pyrénées Haut-Garonnaises

Government
  - Mayor (2022–2026): Didier Labit
- Area^{1}: 3.06 km^{2} (1.18 sq mi)
- Elevation: 800 m (2,600 ft)
- Highest elevation: 1,892 m (6,207 ft)
- Lowest elevation: 680 m (2,230 ft)
- Population (2023): 9
  - Density: 2.9/km^{2} (7.6/sq mi)
- Time zone: UTC+01:00 (CET)
  - Summer (DST): UTC+02:00 (CEST)
- INSEE/Postal code: 31046 /31440
- ^{1} French Land Register data, which excludes lakes, ponds, glaciers > 1 km^{2} (0.386 sq mi or 247 acres) and river estuaries.

Baren is a commune in the Haute-Garonne department in southwestern France.

== Population ==
Historical population
Year	Pop.	±% p.a.
1968	8	—
1975	8	+0.00%
1982	6	−4.03%
1990	6	+0.00%
1999	8	+3.25%
2007	6	−3.53%
2012	8	+5.92%
2017	12	+8.45%
2023	9	−4.68%
Source: INSEE

== See also ==
- Communes of the Haute-Garonne department
