= Malvezie =

- Commune
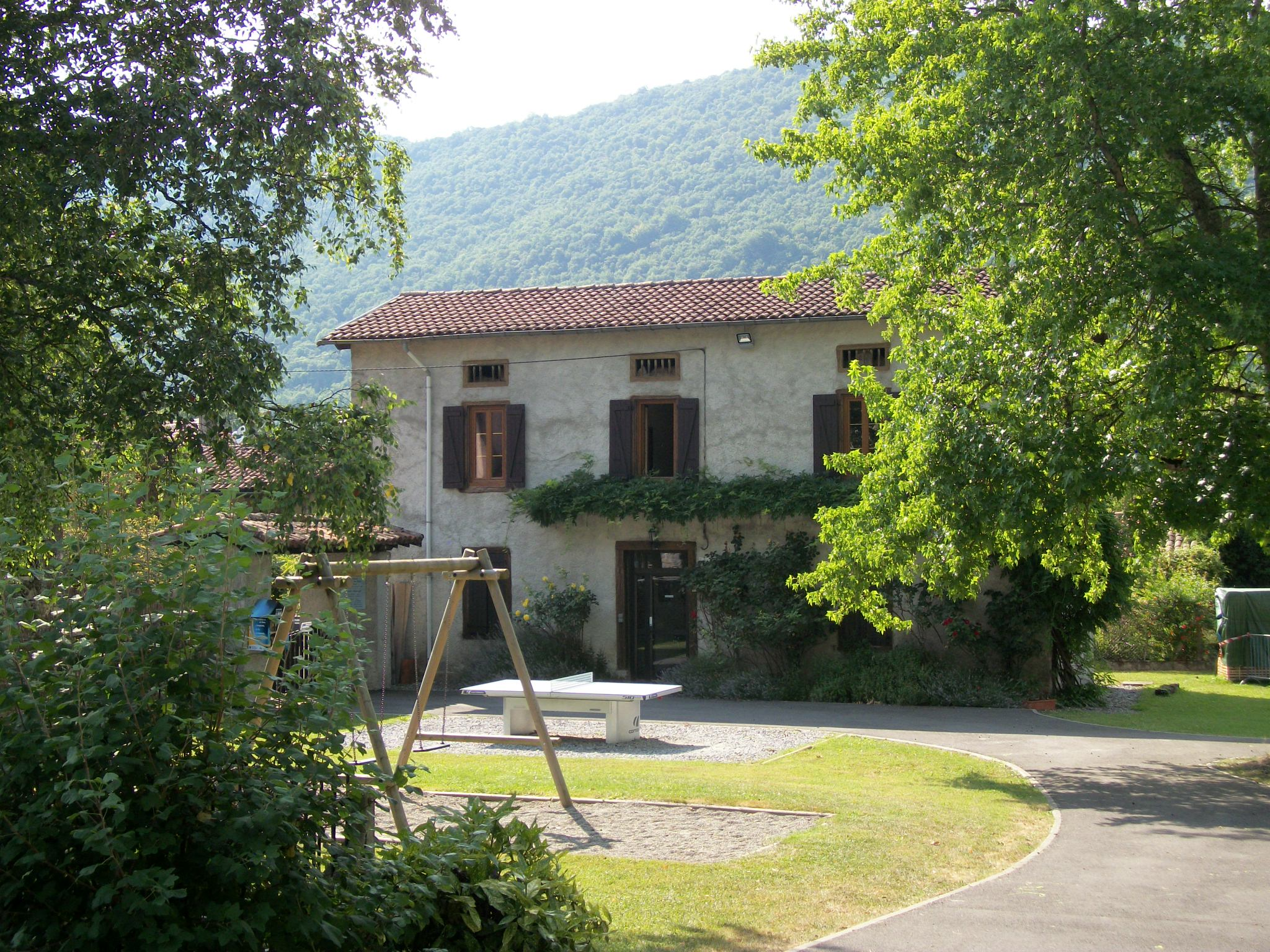
- Malvezie Town hall
- Location of Malvezie
- Location within France Location within Occitanie
- Coordinates: 43°00′24″N 0°41′18″E
- Country: France
- Region: Occitania
- Department: Haute-Garonne
- Arrondissement: Saint-Gaudens
- Canton: Bagnères-de-Luchon

Government
  - Mayor (2020–2026): Daniel Sarraute
- Area^{1}: 8.52 km^{2} (3.29 sq mi)
- Elevation: 550 m (1,800 ft)
- Highest elevation: 896 m (2,940 ft)
- Lowest elevation: 493 m (1,617 ft)
- Population (2023): 113
  - Density: 13.3/km^{2} (34.4/sq mi)
- Time zone: UTC+01:00 (CET)
  - Summer (DST): UTC+02:00 (CEST)
- INSEE/Postal code: 31313 /31510
- ^{1} French Land Register data, which excludes lakes, ponds, glaciers > 1 km^{2} (0.386 sq mi or 247 acres) and river estuaries.

Malvezie (French pronunciation: [malvəzi]; Occitan: Malavedia) is a commune in the Haute-Garonne department in southwestern France.

== Population ==
Historical population
Year	Pop.	±% p.a.
1968	116	—
1975	101	−1.96%
1982	113	+1.62%
1990	90	−2.80%
1999	112	+2.46%
2007	119	+0.76%
2012	126	+1.15%
2017	115	−1.81%
2023	113	−0.29%
Source: INSEE

== See also ==
- Communes of the Haute-Garonne department
