= Izaut-de-l'Hôtel =

- Commune
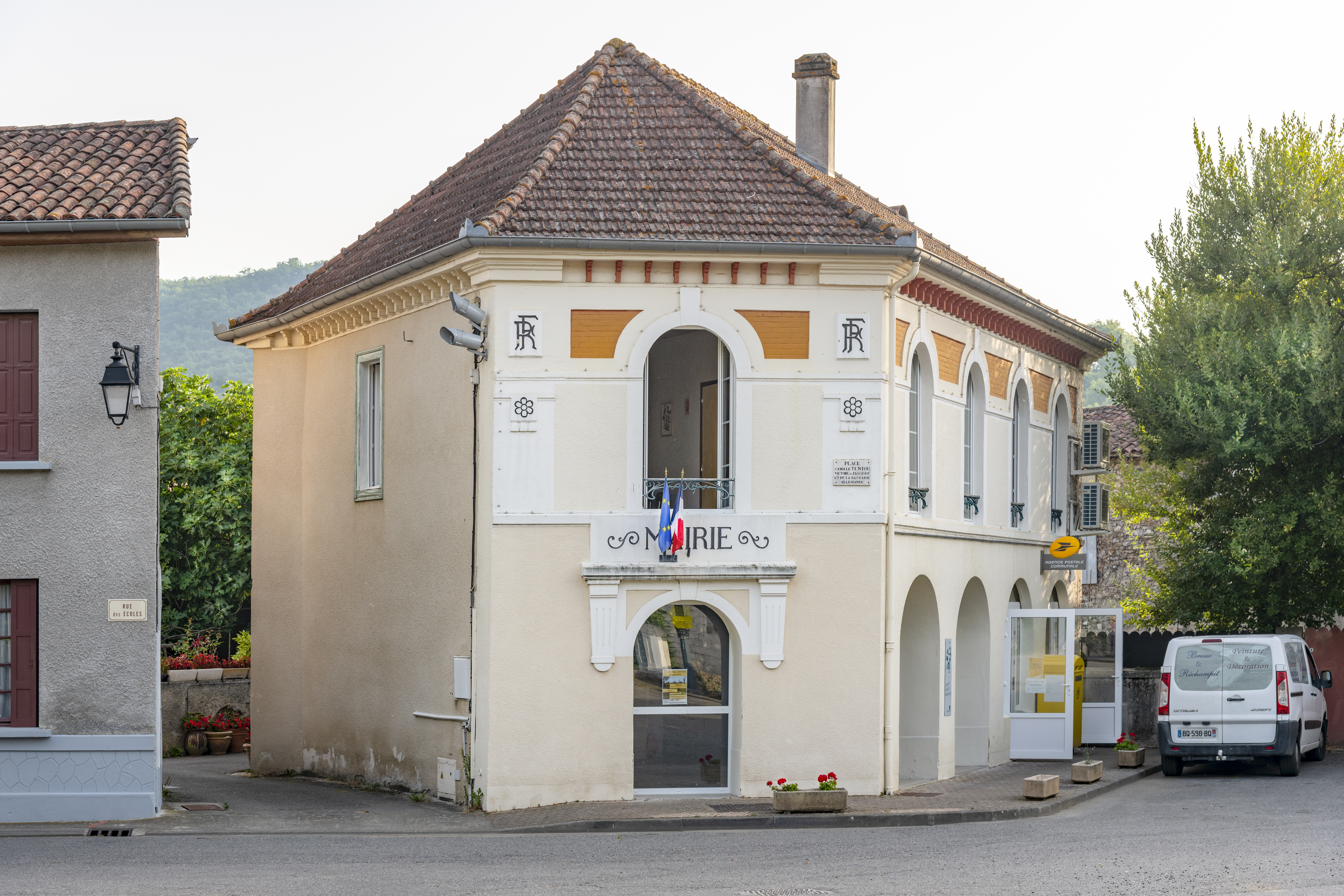
- Town hall of Izaut-de-l'Hôtel.
- Location of Izaut-de-l'Hôtel
- Location within France Location within Occitanie
- Coordinates: 43°01′03″N 0°45′17″E
- Country: France
- Region: Occitania
- Department: Haute-Garonne
- Arrondissement: Saint-Gaudens
- Canton: Bagnères-de-Luchon
- Intercommunality: Cagire-Garonne-Salat

Government
  - Mayor (2020–2026): Christophe Duffaut
- Area^{1}: 9.68 km^{2} (3.74 sq mi)
- Elevation: 414 m (1,358 ft)
- Highest elevation: 800 m (2,600 ft)
- Lowest elevation: 397 m (1,302 ft)
- Population (2023): 298
  - Density: 30.8/km^{2} (79.7/sq mi)
- Time zone: UTC+01:00 (CET)
  - Summer (DST): UTC+02:00 (CEST)
- INSEE/Postal code: 31241 /31160
- ^{1} French Land Register data, which excludes lakes, ponds, glaciers > 1 km^{2} (0.386 sq mi or 247 acres) and river estuaries.

Izaut-de-l'Hôtel (French pronunciation: [izo də lotɛl]; Occitan: Isaut de l'Ostal) is a commune in the Haute-Garonne department in southwestern France.

== Population ==
Historical population
Year	Pop.	±% p.a.
1968	288	—
1975	309	+1.01%
1982	332	+1.03%
1990	320	−0.46%
1999	306	−0.50%
2007	321	+0.60%
2012	297	−1.54%
2017	314	+1.12%
2023	298	−0.87%
Source: INSEE

== See also ==
Communes of the Haute-Garonne department
