= Moustajon =

- Commune
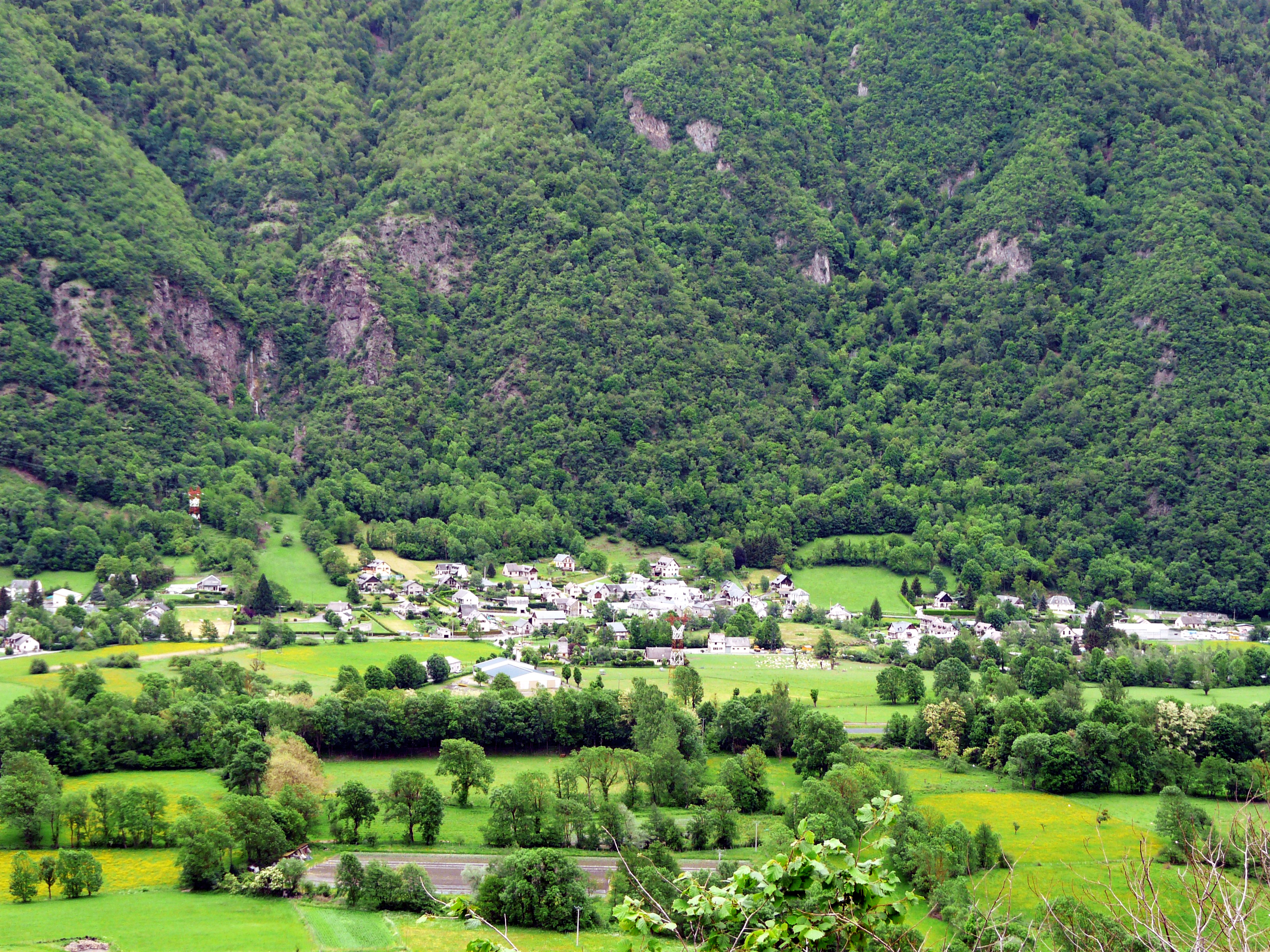
- A general view of Moustajon
- Location of Moustajon
- Location within France Location within Occitanie
- Coordinates: 42°48′55″N 0°35′54″E
- Country: France
- Region: Occitania
- Department: Haute-Garonne
- Arrondissement: Saint-Gaudens
- Canton: Bagnères-de-Luchon

Government
  - Mayor (2020–2026): Jean-François Abadia
- Area^{1}: 2.3 km^{2} (0.89 sq mi)
- Elevation: 609 m (1,998 ft)
- Highest elevation: 1,708 m (5,604 ft)
- Lowest elevation: 605 m (1,985 ft)
- Population (2023): 127
  - Density: 55/km^{2} (140/sq mi)
- Time zone: UTC+01:00 (CET)
  - Summer (DST): UTC+02:00 (CEST)
- INSEE/Postal code: 31394 /31110
- ^{1} French Land Register data, which excludes lakes, ponds, glaciers > 1 km^{2} (0.386 sq mi or 247 acres) and river estuaries.

Moustajon (French pronunciation: [mustaʒɔ̃]; Occitan: Mostajon) is a commune in the Haute-Garonne department in southwestern France.

== Population ==
Historical population
Year	Pop.	±% p.a.
1968	51	—
1975	92	+8.79%
1982	129	+4.95%
1990	174	+3.81%
1999	180	+0.38%
2007	172	−0.57%
2012	171	−0.12%
2017	136	−4.48%
2023	127	−1.13%
Source: INSEE

== See also ==
- Communes of the Haute-Garonne department
