= Mancioux =

- Commune
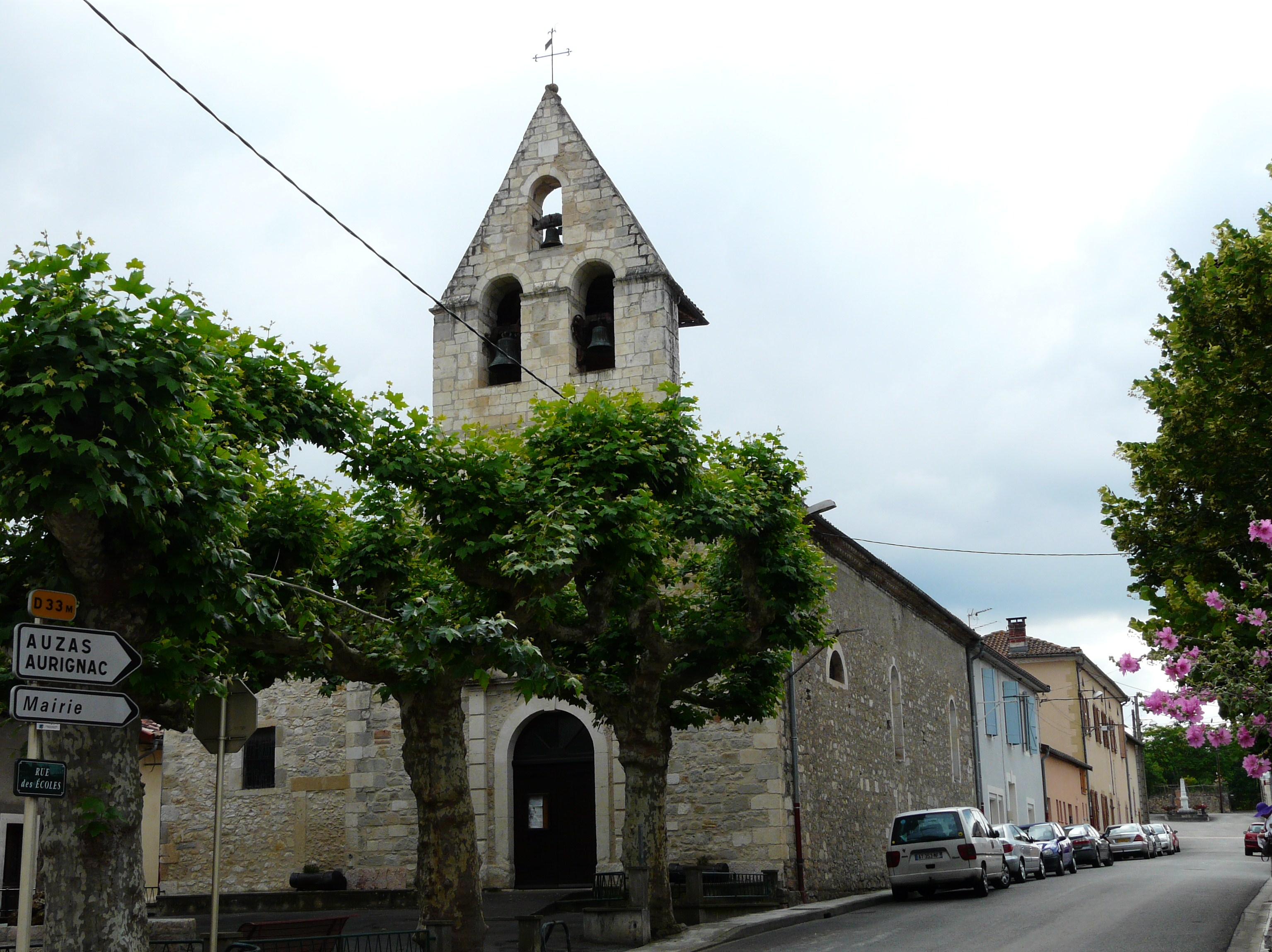
- The church in Mancioux
- Location of Mancioux
- Location within France Location within Occitanie
- Coordinates: 43°09′31″N 0°57′08″E
- Country: France
- Region: Occitania
- Department: Haute-Garonne
- Arrondissement: Saint-Gaudens
- Canton: Bagnères-de-Luchon
- Intercommunality: Cagire Garonne Salat

Government
  - Mayor (2020–2026): Henri Goizet
- Area^{1}: 7.22 km^{2} (2.79 sq mi)
- Elevation: 280 m (920 ft)
- Highest elevation: 485 m (1,591 ft)
- Lowest elevation: 274 m (899 ft)
- Population (2023): 386
  - Density: 53.5/km^{2} (138/sq mi)
- Time zone: UTC+01:00 (CET)
  - Summer (DST): UTC+02:00 (CEST)
- INSEE/Postal code: 31314 /31360
- ^{1} French Land Register data, which excludes lakes, ponds, glaciers > 1 km^{2} (0.386 sq mi or 247 acres) and river estuaries.

Mancioux (French pronunciation: [mɑ̃sju]; Occitan: Mancius) is a commune in the Haute-Garonne department in southwestern France.

== Population ==
Historical population
| Year | Pop. | ±% p.a. |
|---|---|---|
| 1968 | 393 | — |
| 1975 | 347 | −1.76% |
| 1982 | 406 | +2.27% |
| 1990 | 391 | −0.47% |
| 1999 | 344 | −1.41% |
| 2007 | 409 | +2.19% |
| 2012 | 435 | +1.24% |
| 2017 | 409 | −1.23% |
| 2023 | 386 | −0.96% |
Source: INSEE

== See also ==
- Communes of the Haute-Garonne department
