= Estadens =

- Commune
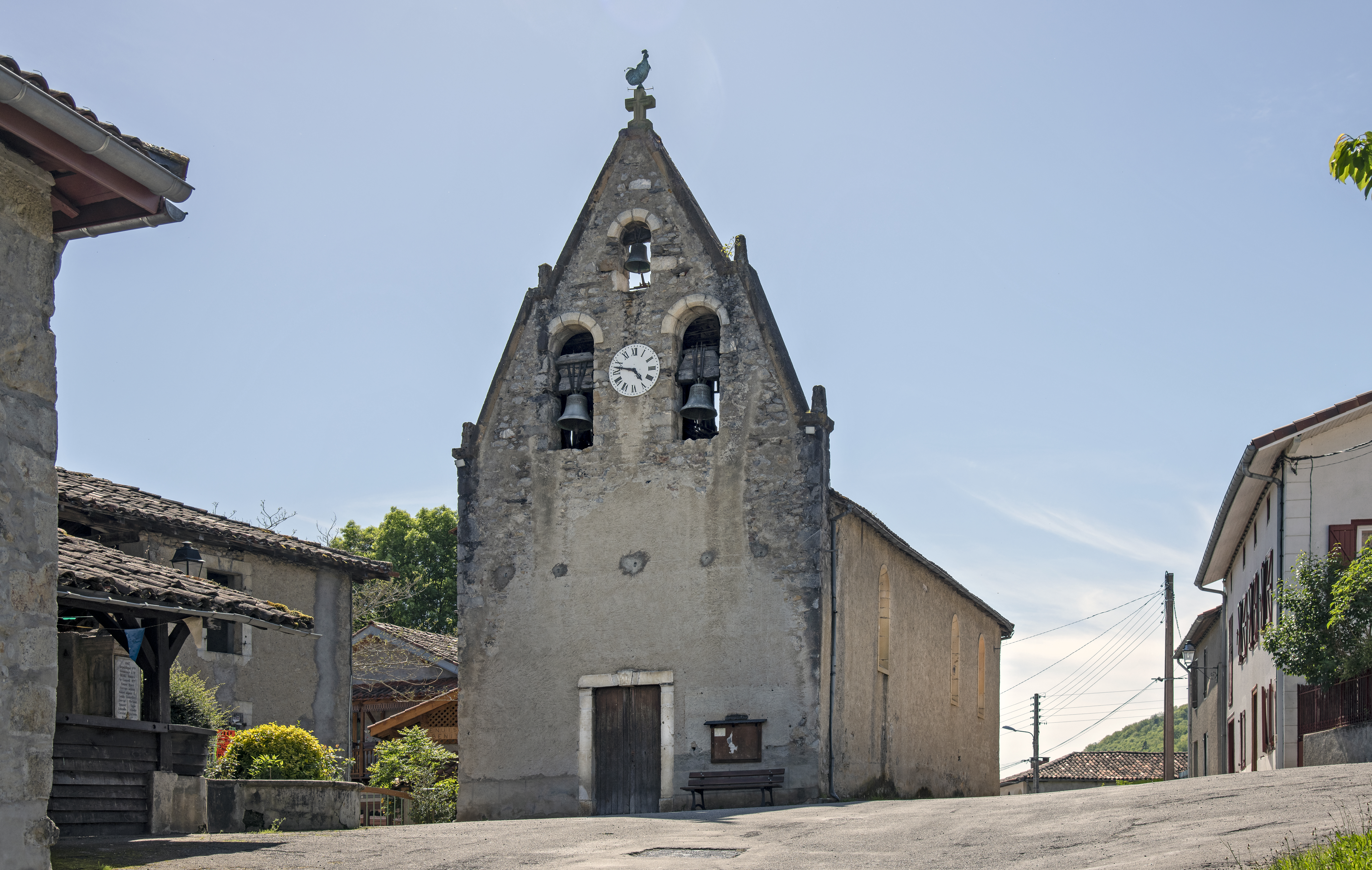
- The chapel in Pujos.
- Location of Estadens
- Location within France Location within Occitanie
- Coordinates: 43°02′10″N 0°50′50″E
- Country: France
- Region: Occitania
- Department: Haute-Garonne
- Arrondissement: Saint-Gaudens
- Canton: Bagnères-de-Luchon

Government
  - Mayor (2020–2026): Robert Martin
- Area^{1}: 17.47 km^{2} (6.75 sq mi)
- Elevation: 470 m (1,540 ft)
- Highest elevation: 805 m (2,641 ft)
- Lowest elevation: 396 m (1,299 ft)
- Population (2023): 526
  - Density: 30.1/km^{2} (78.0/sq mi)
- Time zone: UTC+01:00 (CET)
  - Summer (DST): UTC+02:00 (CEST)
- INSEE/Postal code: 31174 /31160
- ^{1} French Land Register data, which excludes lakes, ponds, glaciers > 1 km^{2} (0.386 sq mi or 247 acres) and river estuaries.

Estadens is a commune in the Haute-Garonne department in southwestern France.

== Population ==
Historical population
Year	Pop.	±% p.a.
1968	426	—
1975	390	−1.25%
1982	303	−3.54%
1990	425	+4.32%
1999	425	+0.00%
2007	489	+1.77%
2012	518	+1.16%
2017	528	+0.38%
2023	526	−0.06%
Source: INSEE

== See also ==
- Communes of the Haute-Garonne department
