= Génos, Haute-Garonne =

Génos
- Commune
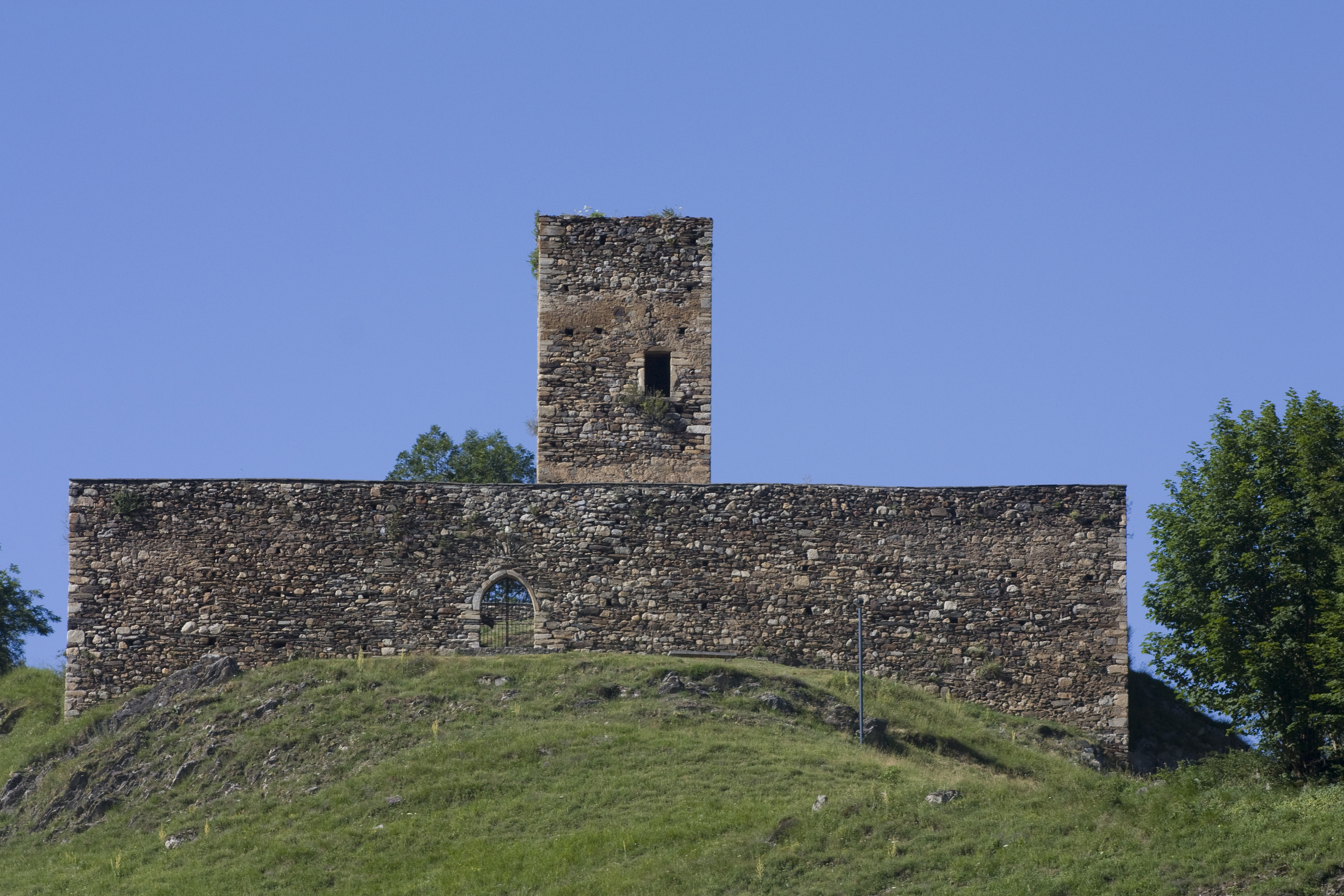
- Chateau
- Location of Génos
- Location within France Location within Occitanie
- Coordinates: 43°00′06″N 0°40′28″E
- Country: France
- Region: Occitania
- Department: Haute-Garonne
- Arrondissement: Saint-Gaudens
- Canton: Bagnères-de-Luchon

Government
  - Mayor (2020–2026): Denis Chapot
- Area^{1}: 3.47 km^{2} (1.34 sq mi)
- Elevation: 500 m (1,600 ft)
- Highest elevation: 922 m (3,025 ft)
- Lowest elevation: 517 m (1,696 ft)
- Population (2023): 71
  - Density: 20/km^{2} (53/sq mi)
- Time zone: UTC+01:00 (CET)
  - Summer (DST): UTC+02:00 (CEST)
- INSEE/Postal code: 31217 /31510
- ^{1} French Land Register data, which excludes lakes, ponds, glaciers > 1 km^{2} (0.386 sq mi or 247 acres) and river estuaries.

Génos (Occitan: Genos) is a commune in the Haute-Garonne department in southwestern France.

== Population ==
Historical population
Year	Pop.	±% p.a.
1968	53	—
1975	74	+4.88%
1982	93	+3.32%
1990	84	−1.26%
1999	75	−1.25%
2007	92	+2.59%
2012	87	−1.11%
2017	70	−4.26%
2023	71	+0.24%
Source: INSEE

== See also ==
- Communes of the Haute-Garonne department
