= Lourde, Haute-Garonne =

Lourde
- Commune
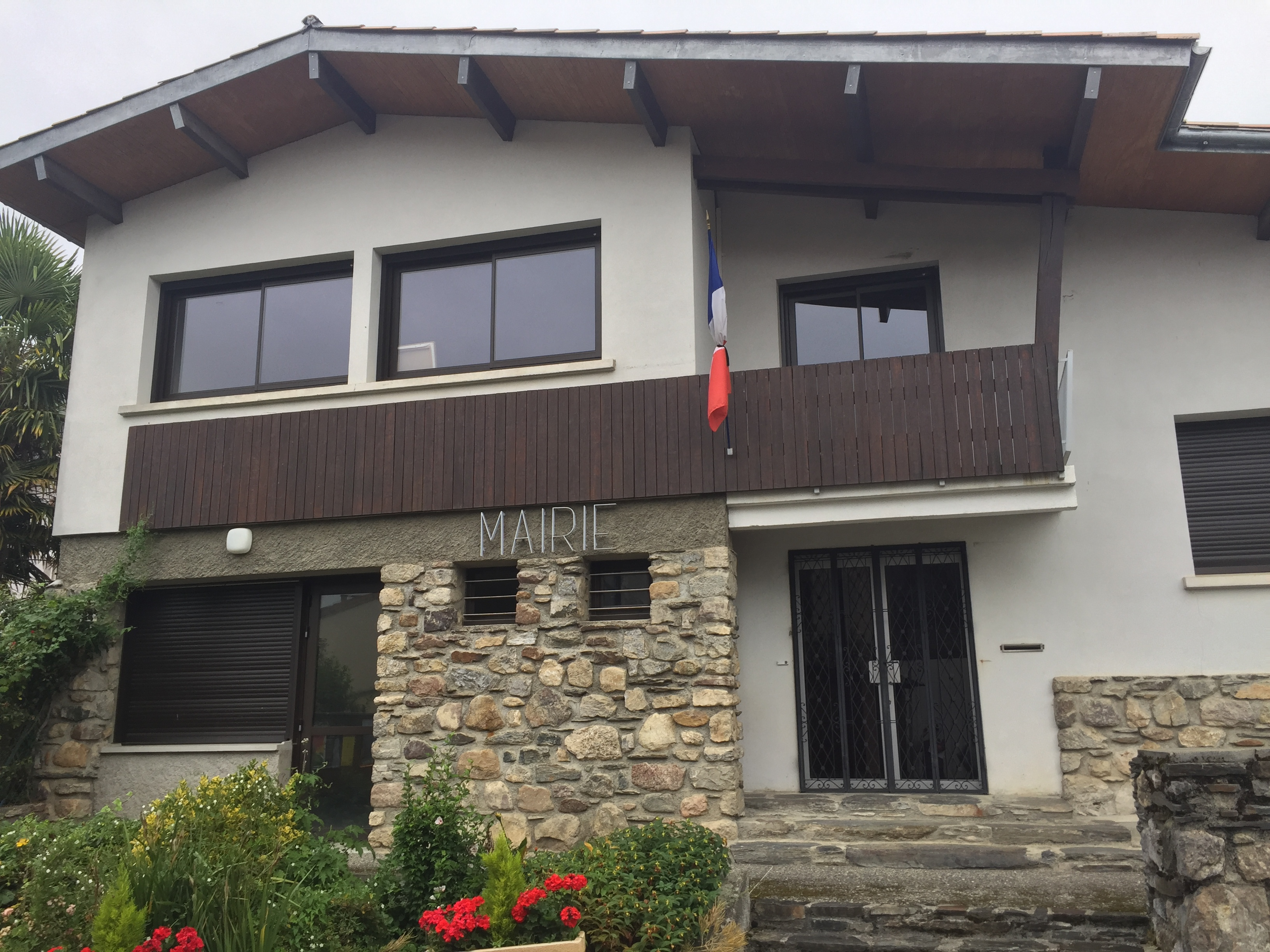
- The town hall in Lourde
- Location of Lourde
- Location within France Location within Occitanie
- Coordinates: 42°59′06″N 0°39′42″E
- Country: France
- Region: Occitania
- Department: Haute-Garonne
- Arrondissement: Saint-Gaudens
- Canton: Bagnères-de-Luchon

Government
  - Mayor (2021–2026): Olivier Carcy
- Area^{1}: 1.24 km^{2} (0.48 sq mi)
- Elevation: 600 m (2,000 ft)
- Highest elevation: 860 m (2,820 ft)
- Lowest elevation: 533 m (1,749 ft)
- Population (2023): 123
  - Density: 99.2/km^{2} (257/sq mi)
- Time zone: UTC+01:00 (CET)
  - Summer (DST): UTC+02:00 (CEST)
- INSEE/Postal code: 31306 /31510
- ^{1} French Land Register data, which excludes lakes, ponds, glaciers > 1 km^{2} (0.386 sq mi or 247 acres) and river estuaries.

Lourde (French pronunciation: [luʁd]; Occitan: Lorda) is a commune in the Haute-Garonne department in southwestern France.

== Population ==
Historical population
Year	Pop.	±% p.a.
1968	87	—
1975	85	−0.33%
1982	74	−1.96%
1990	62	−2.19%
1999	88	+3.97%
2007	100	+1.61%
2012	92	−1.65%
2017	92	+0.00%
2023	123	+4.96%
Source: INSEE

== See also ==
- Communes of the Haute-Garonne department
