= Montastruc-de-Salies =

- Commune
- Location of Montastruc-de-Salies
- Location within France Location within Occitanie
- Coordinates: 43°01′50″N 0°53′38″E
- Country: France
- Region: Occitania
- Department: Haute-Garonne
- Arrondissement: Saint-Gaudens
- Canton: Bagnères-de-Luchon
- Intercommunality: Cagire Garonne Salat

Government
  - Mayor (2020–2026): Bertrand Lacarrere
- Area^{1}: 16.12 km^{2} (6.22 sq mi)
- Elevation: 400 m (1,300 ft)
- Highest elevation: 811 m (2,661 ft)
- Lowest elevation: 327 m (1,073 ft)
- Population (2023): 302
  - Density: 18.7/km^{2} (48.5/sq mi)
- Time zone: UTC+01:00 (CET)
  - Summer (DST): UTC+02:00 (CEST)
- INSEE/Postal code: 31357 /31160
- ^{1} French Land Register data, which excludes lakes, ponds, glaciers > 1 km^{2} (0.386 sq mi or 247 acres) and river estuaries.

Montastruc-de-Salies (French pronunciation: [mɔ̃tastʁyk də sali]; Occitan: Montastruc de Salias) is a commune in the Haute-Garonne department in southwestern France.

== Population ==
Historical population
| Year | Pop. | ±% p.a. |
|---|---|---|
| 1968 | 375 | — |
| 1975 | 341 | −1.35% |
| 1982 | 297 | −1.95% |
| 1990 | 285 | −0.51% |
| 1999 | 292 | +0.27% |
| 2007 | 274 | −0.79% |
| 2012 | 266 | −0.59% |
| 2017 | 288 | +1.60% |
| 2023 | 302 | +0.79% |
Source: INSEE

== See also ==
- Communes of the Haute-Garonne department
