= Signac =

- Commune
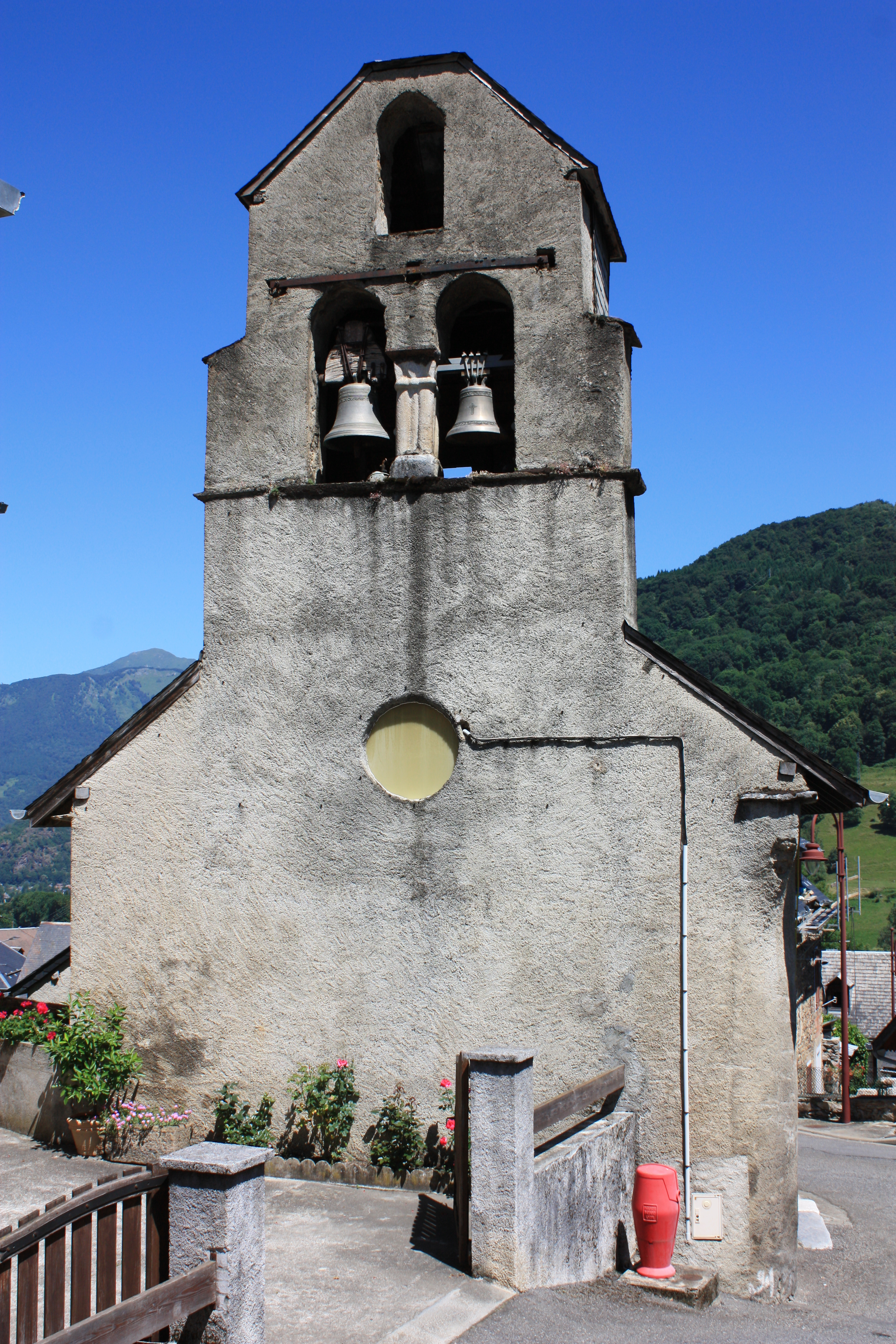
- The church in Signac
- Location of Signac
- Location within France Location within Occitanie
- Coordinates: 42°54′22″N 0°37′45″E
- Country: France
- Region: Occitania
- Department: Haute-Garonne
- Arrondissement: Saint-Gaudens
- Canton: Bagnères-de-Luchon
- Intercommunality: Pyrénées Haut Garonnaises

Government
  - Mayor (2020–2026): Bernard-Blaise Guaus
- Area^{1}: 3.51 km^{2} (1.36 sq mi)
- Elevation: 450 m (1,480 ft)
- Highest elevation: 1,644 m (5,394 ft)
- Lowest elevation: 490 m (1,610 ft)
- Population (2023): 40
  - Density: 11/km^{2} (30/sq mi)
- Time zone: UTC+01:00 (CET)
  - Summer (DST): UTC+02:00 (CEST)
- INSEE/Postal code: 31548 /31440
- ^{1} French Land Register data, which excludes lakes, ponds, glaciers > 1 km^{2} (0.386 sq mi or 247 acres) and river estuaries.

Signac (French pronunciation: [siɲak]; Occitan: Sinhac) is a commune in the Haute-Garonne department in southwestern France.

== Population ==
Its inhabitants are called Signacais.

Historical population
Year	Pop.	±% p.a.
1968	97	—
1975	76	−3.43%
1982	75	−0.19%
1990	77	+0.33%
1999	58	−3.10%
2007	56	−0.44%
2012	45	−4.28%
2017	48	+1.30%
2023	40	−2.99%
Source: INSEE

== See also ==
- Communes of the Haute-Garonne department
