= Castelbiague =

- Commune
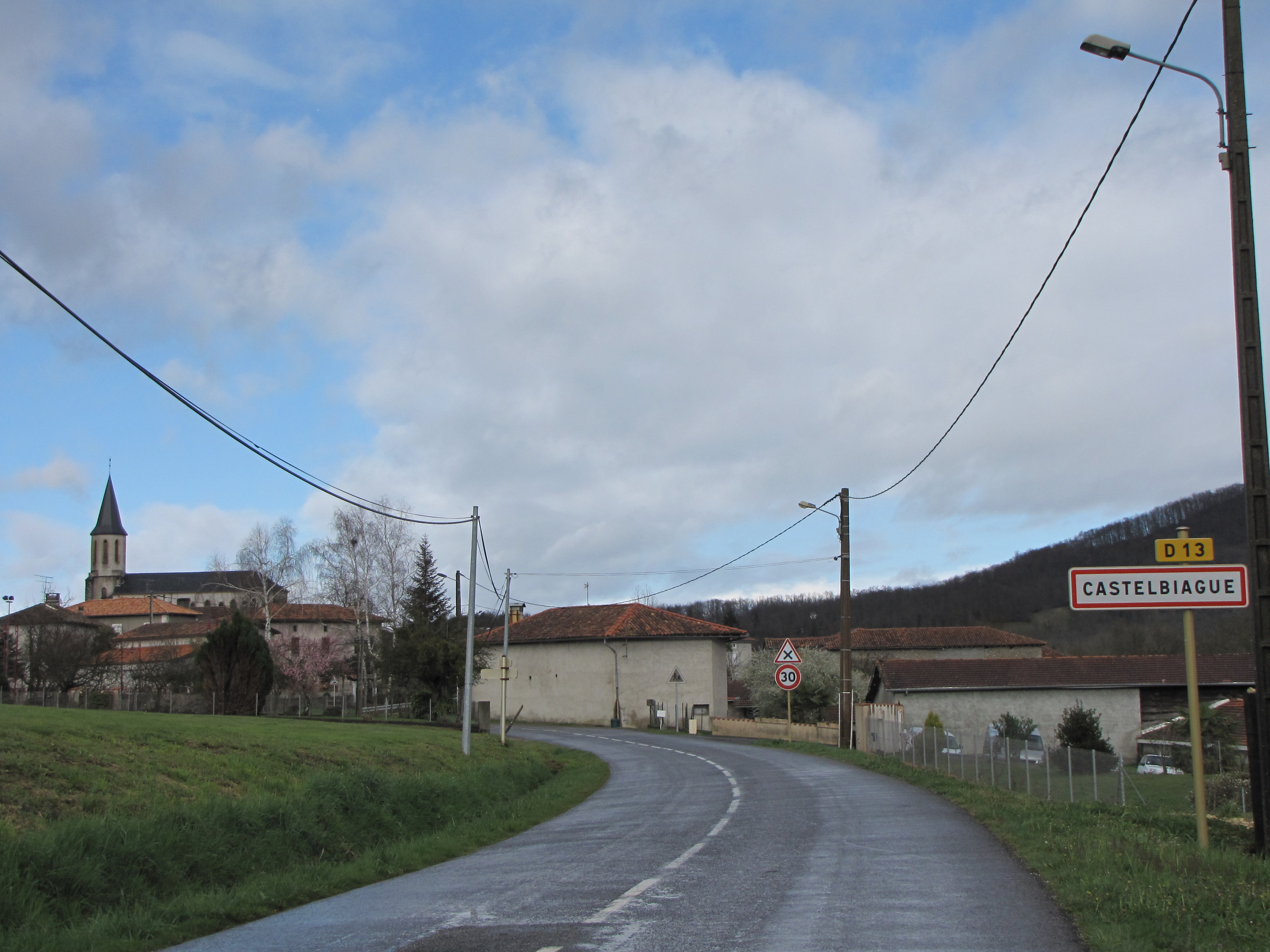
- The road into Castelbiague
- Location of Castelbiague
- Location within France Location within Occitanie
- Coordinates: 43°02′14″N 0°55′31″E
- Country: France
- Region: Occitania
- Department: Haute-Garonne
- Arrondissement: Saint-Gaudens
- Canton: Bagnères-de-Luchon
- Intercommunality: Cagire Garonne Salat

Government
  - Mayor (2020–2026): Henri Ribet
- Area^{1}: 5.84 km^{2} (2.25 sq mi)
- Elevation: 376 m (1,234 ft)
- Highest elevation: 702 m (2,303 ft)
- Lowest elevation: 334 m (1,096 ft)
- Population (2023): 234
  - Density: 40.1/km^{2} (104/sq mi)
- Time zone: UTC+01:00 (CET)
  - Summer (DST): UTC+02:00 (CEST)
- INSEE/Postal code: 31114 /31160
- ^{1} French Land Register data, which excludes lakes, ponds, glaciers > 1 km^{2} (0.386 sq mi or 247 acres) and river estuaries.

Castelbiague (French pronunciation: [kastɛlbjaɡ]; Occitan: Castèthviague) is a commune in the Haute-Garonne department in southwestern France.

== Population ==
Historical population
Year	Pop.	±% p.a.
1968	205	—
1975	208	+0.21%
1982	210	+0.14%
1990	205	−0.30%
1999	209	+0.21%
2007	229	+1.15%
2012	233	+0.35%
2017	251	+1.50%
2023	234	−1.16%
Source: INSEE

== See also ==
- Communes of the Haute-Garonne department
