= Rouède =

- Commune
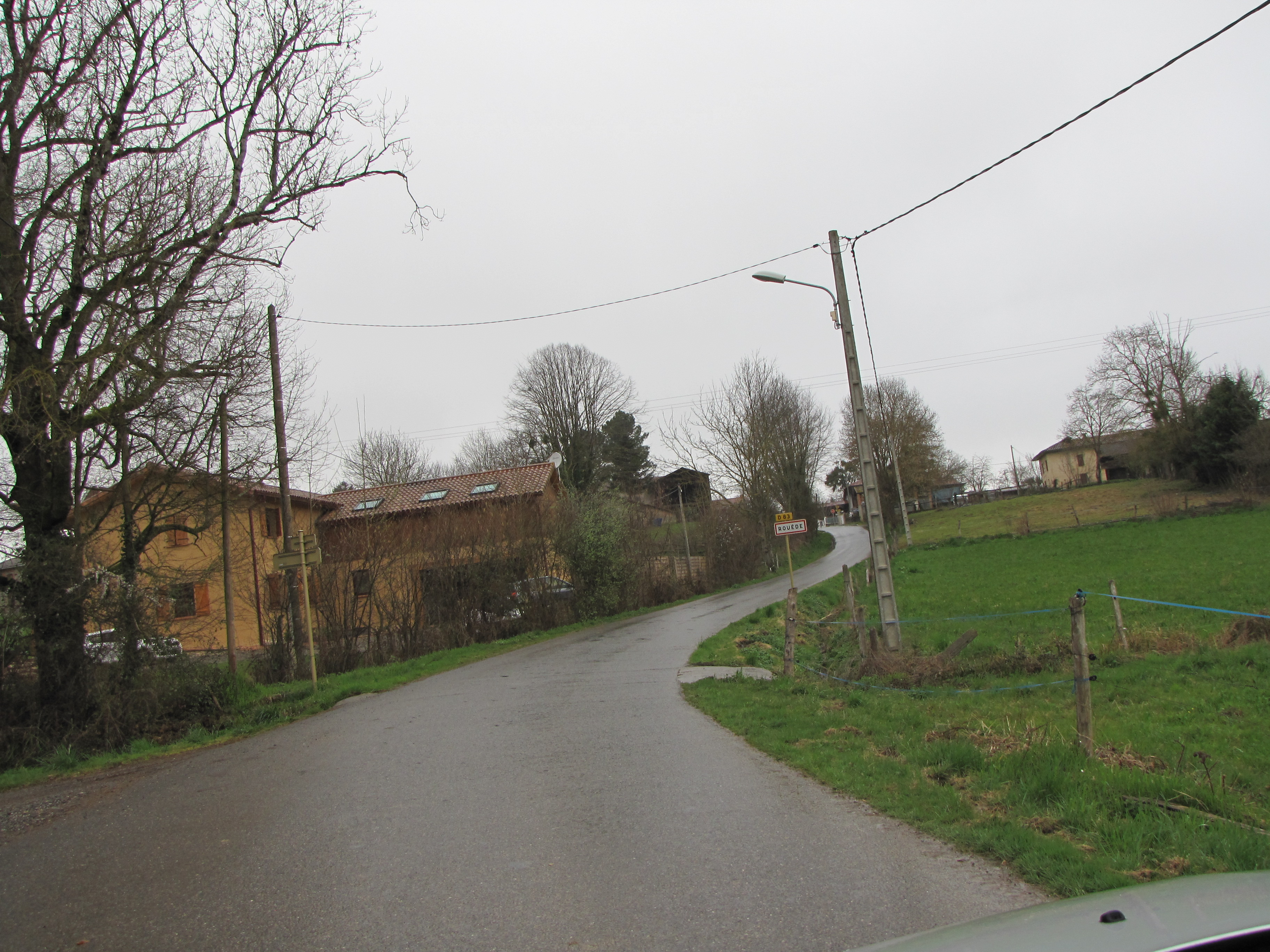
- The road into Rouède
- Location of Rouède
- Location within France Location within Occitanie
- Coordinates: 43°03′13″N 0°52′56″E
- Country: France
- Region: Occitania
- Department: Haute-Garonne
- Arrondissement: Saint-Gaudens
- Canton: Bagnères-de-Luchon
- Intercommunality: Cagire Garonne Salat

Government
  - Mayor (2020–2026): André Casteras
- Area^{1}: 6.2 km^{2} (2.4 sq mi)
- Elevation: 400 m (1,300 ft)
- Highest elevation: 489 m (1,604 ft)
- Lowest elevation: 356 m (1,168 ft)
- Population (2023): 285
  - Density: 46/km^{2} (120/sq mi)
- Time zone: UTC+01:00 (CET)
  - Summer (DST): UTC+02:00 (CEST)
- INSEE/Postal code: 31461 /31160
- ^{1} French Land Register data, which excludes lakes, ponds, glaciers > 1 km^{2} (0.386 sq mi or 247 acres) and river estuaries.

Rouède (French pronunciation: [ʁwɛd]; Occitan: Arrueda) is a commune in the Haute-Garonne department in southwestern France.

== Population ==
Historical population
Year	Pop.	±% p.a.
1968	267	—
1975	248	−1.05%
1982	221	−1.63%
1990	227	+0.34%
1999	236	+0.43%
2007	279	+2.11%
2012	285	+0.43%
2017	292	+0.49%
2023	285	−0.40%
Source: INSEE

== See also ==
- Communes of the Haute-Garonne department
