= Cassagne =

- Commune
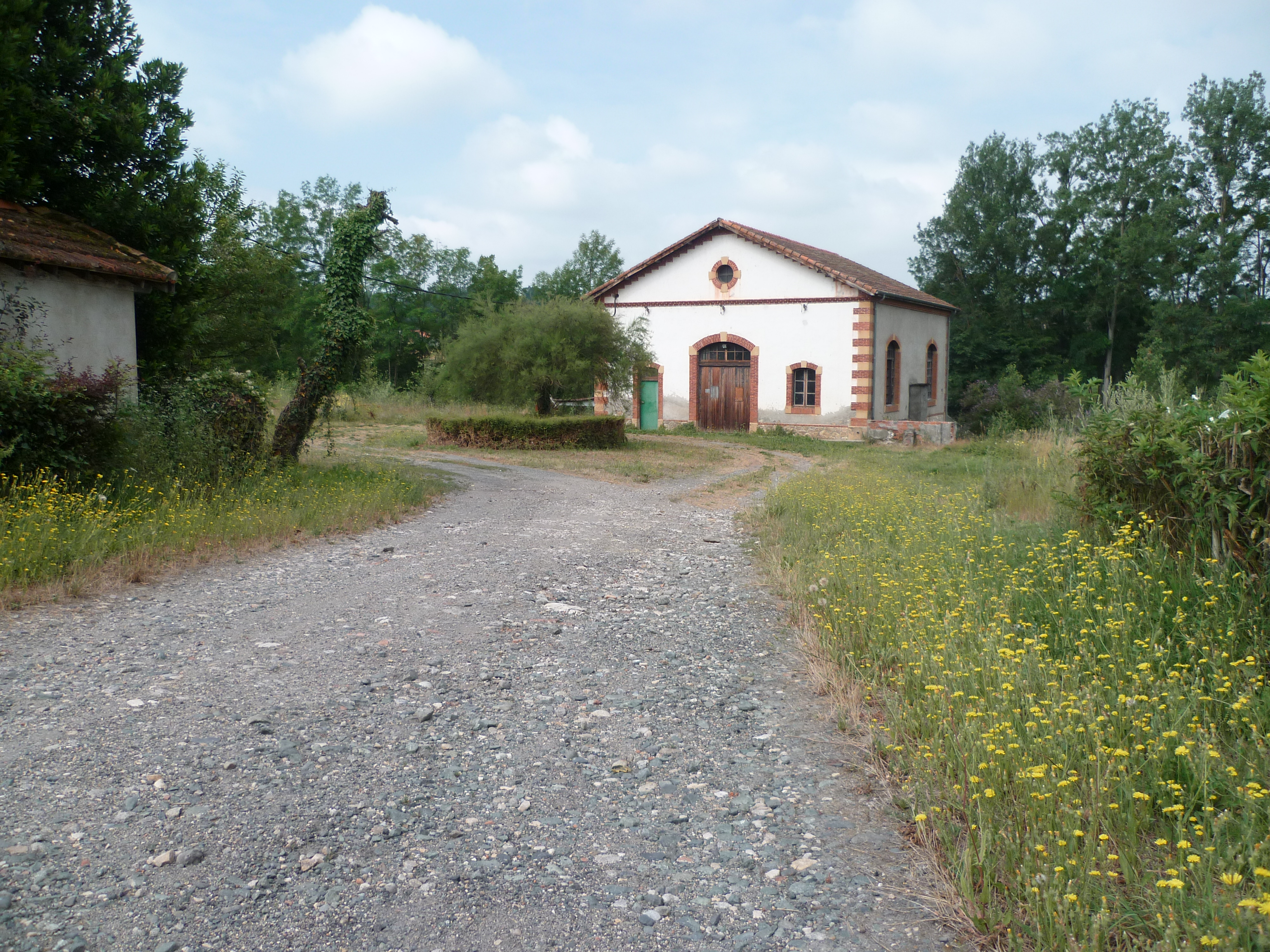
- The hydroelectric power station, on the Salat river, in Cassagne

- Coat of arms
- Location of Cassagne
- Location within France Location within Occitanie
- Coordinates: 43°07′27″N 0°59′21″E
- Country: France
- Region: Occitania
- Department: Haute-Garonne
- Arrondissement: Saint-Gaudens
- Canton: Bagnères-de-Luchon
- Intercommunality: Cagire Garonne Salat

Government
  - Mayor (2020–2026): Philippe Souquet
- Area^{1}: 10.97 km^{2} (4.24 sq mi)
- Elevation: 330 m (1,080 ft)
- Highest elevation: 470 m (1,540 ft)
- Lowest elevation: 278 m (912 ft)
- Population (2023): 641
  - Density: 58.4/km^{2} (151/sq mi)
- Time zone: UTC+01:00 (CET)
  - Summer (DST): UTC+02:00 (CEST)
- INSEE/Postal code: 31110 /31260
- ^{1} French Land Register data, which excludes lakes, ponds, glaciers > 1 km^{2} (0.386 sq mi or 247 acres) and river estuaries.

Cassagne (French pronunciation: [kasaɲ]; Occitan: Cassanha) is a commune in the Haute-Garonne department in southwestern France.

The parish church is dedicated to Notre Dame.

== Population ==
Historical population
Year	Pop.	±% p.a.
1968	647	—
1975	585	−1.43%
1982	594	+0.22%
1990	618	+0.50%
1999	621	+0.05%
2007	633	+0.24%
2012	641	+0.25%
2017	634	−0.22%
2023	641	+0.18%
Source: INSEE

== See also ==
- Communes of the Haute-Garonne department
