= Beauchalot =

- Commune
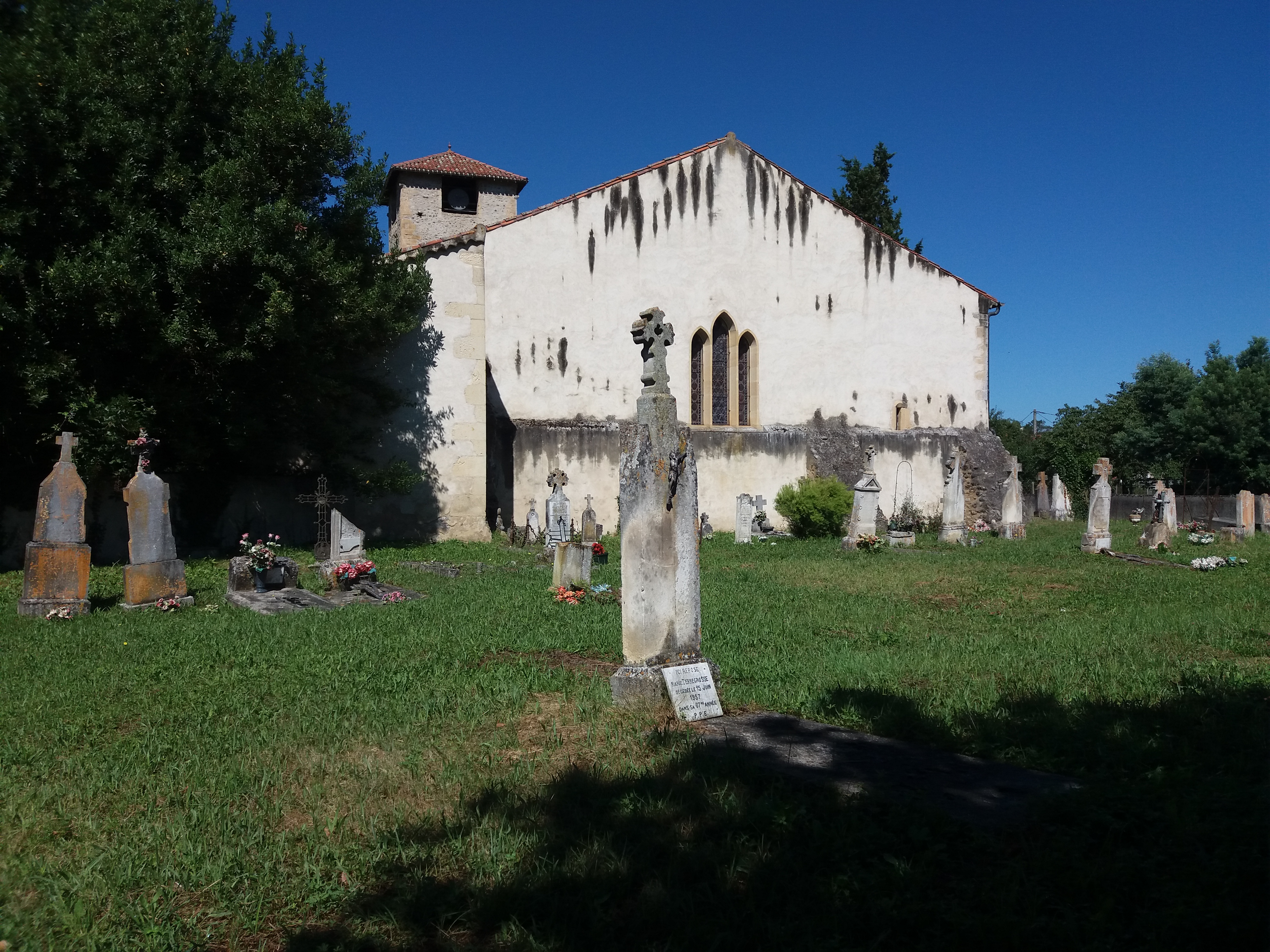
- The church and cemetery in Beauchalot
- Location of Beauchalot
- Location within France Location within Occitanie
- Coordinates: 43°06′30″N 0°52′11″E
- Country: France
- Region: Occitania
- Department: Haute-Garonne
- Arrondissement: Saint-Gaudens
- Canton: Bagnères-de-Luchon
- Intercommunality: Cagire Garonne Salat

Government
  - Mayor (2020–2026): Jean-Luc Picard
- Area^{1}: 6.33 km^{2} (2.44 sq mi)
- Elevation: 316 m (1,037 ft)
- Highest elevation: 410 m (1,350 ft)
- Lowest elevation: 295 m (968 ft)
- Population (2023): 662
  - Density: 105/km^{2} (271/sq mi)
- Time zone: UTC+01:00 (CET)
  - Summer (DST): UTC+02:00 (CEST)
- INSEE/Postal code: 31050 /31360
- ^{1} French Land Register data, which excludes lakes, ponds, glaciers > 1 km^{2} (0.386 sq mi or 247 acres) and river estuaries.

Beauchalot (French pronunciation: [boʃalo]; Occitan: Vauchalòt) is a commune in the Haute-Garonne department in southwestern France. It is only about 50 minutes away from the Spanish border.

== Population ==
Historical population
Year	Pop.	±% p.a.
1968	315	—
1975	342	+1.18%
1982	350	+0.33%
1990	380	+1.03%
1999	390	+0.29%
2007	515	+3.54%
2012	487	−1.11%
2017	640	+5.62%
2023	662	+0.56%
Source: INSEE

== See also ==
- Communes of the Haute-Garonne department
