= Cabanac-Cazaux =

- Commune
- Location of Cabanac-Cazaux
- Location within France Location within Occitanie
- Coordinates: 43°02′03″N 0°44′24″E
- Country: France
- Region: Occitania
- Department: Haute-Garonne
- Arrondissement: Saint-Gaudens
- Canton: Bagnères-de-Luchon
- Intercommunality: Cagire Garonne Salat

Government
  - Mayor (2020–2026): Gilles Favarel
- Area^{1}: 3.81 km^{2} (1.47 sq mi)
- Elevation: 399 m (1,309 ft)
- Highest elevation: 788 m (2,585 ft)
- Lowest elevation: 380 m (1,250 ft)
- Population (2023): 128
  - Density: 33.6/km^{2} (87.0/sq mi)
- Time zone: UTC+01:00 (CET)
  - Summer (DST): UTC+02:00 (CEST)
- INSEE/Postal code: 31095 /31160
- ^{1} French Land Register data, which excludes lakes, ponds, glaciers > 1 km^{2} (0.386 sq mi or 247 acres) and river estuaries.

Cabanac-Cazaux (French pronunciation: [kabanak kazo]; Occitan: Cabanac e Casaus) is a commune in the Haute-Garonne department in southwestern France.

== Population ==
Historical population
Year	Pop.	±% p.a.
1968	74	—
1975	87	+2.34%
1982	94	+1.11%
1990	106	+1.51%
1999	108	+0.21%
2007	110	+0.23%
2012	130	+3.40%
2017	126	−0.62%
2023	128	+0.26%
Source: INSEE

== See also ==
- Communes of the Haute-Garonne department
