= Portet-de-Luchon =

- Commune
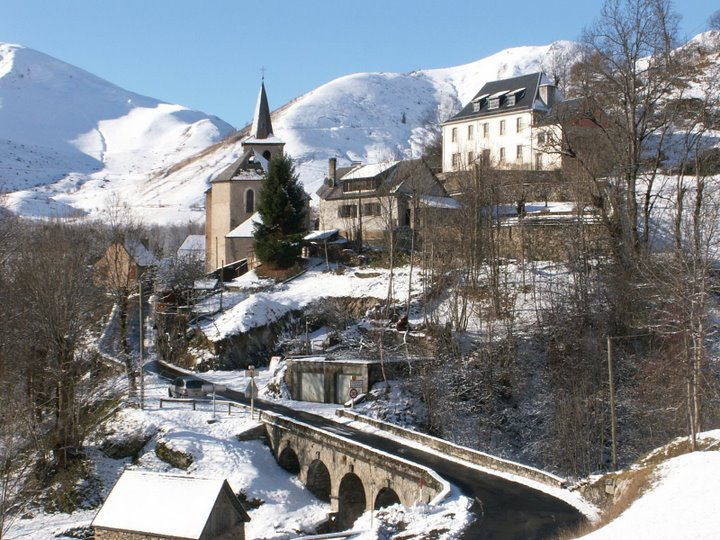
- A general view of Portet-de-Luchon
- Location of Portet-de-Luchon
- Location within France Location within Occitanie
- Coordinates: 42°48′51″N 0°29′12″E
- Country: France
- Region: Occitania
- Department: Haute-Garonne
- Arrondissement: Saint-Gaudens
- Canton: Bagnères-de-Luchon

Government
  - Mayor (2021–2026): Anne Soye
- Area^{1}: 4.11 km^{2} (1.59 sq mi)
- Elevation: 1,250 m (4,100 ft)
- Highest elevation: 1,928 m (6,325 ft)
- Lowest elevation: 1,229 m (4,032 ft)
- Population (2023): 37
  - Density: 9.0/km^{2} (23/sq mi)
- Time zone: UTC+01:00 (CET)
  - Summer (DST): UTC+02:00 (CEST)
- INSEE/Postal code: 31432 /31110
- ^{1} French Land Register data, which excludes lakes, ponds, glaciers > 1 km^{2} (0.386 sq mi or 247 acres) and river estuaries.

Portet-de-Luchon is a commune in the Haute-Garonne department in southwestern France.

== Population ==
Historical population
Year	Pop.	±% p.a.
1968	40	—
1975	45	+1.70%
1982	35	−3.53%
1990	40	+1.68%
1999	32	−2.45%
2007	28	−1.66%
2012	34	+3.96%
2017	39	+2.78%
2023	37	−0.87%
Source: INSEE

== See also ==
- Communes of the Haute-Garonne department
