= Milhas =

- Commune
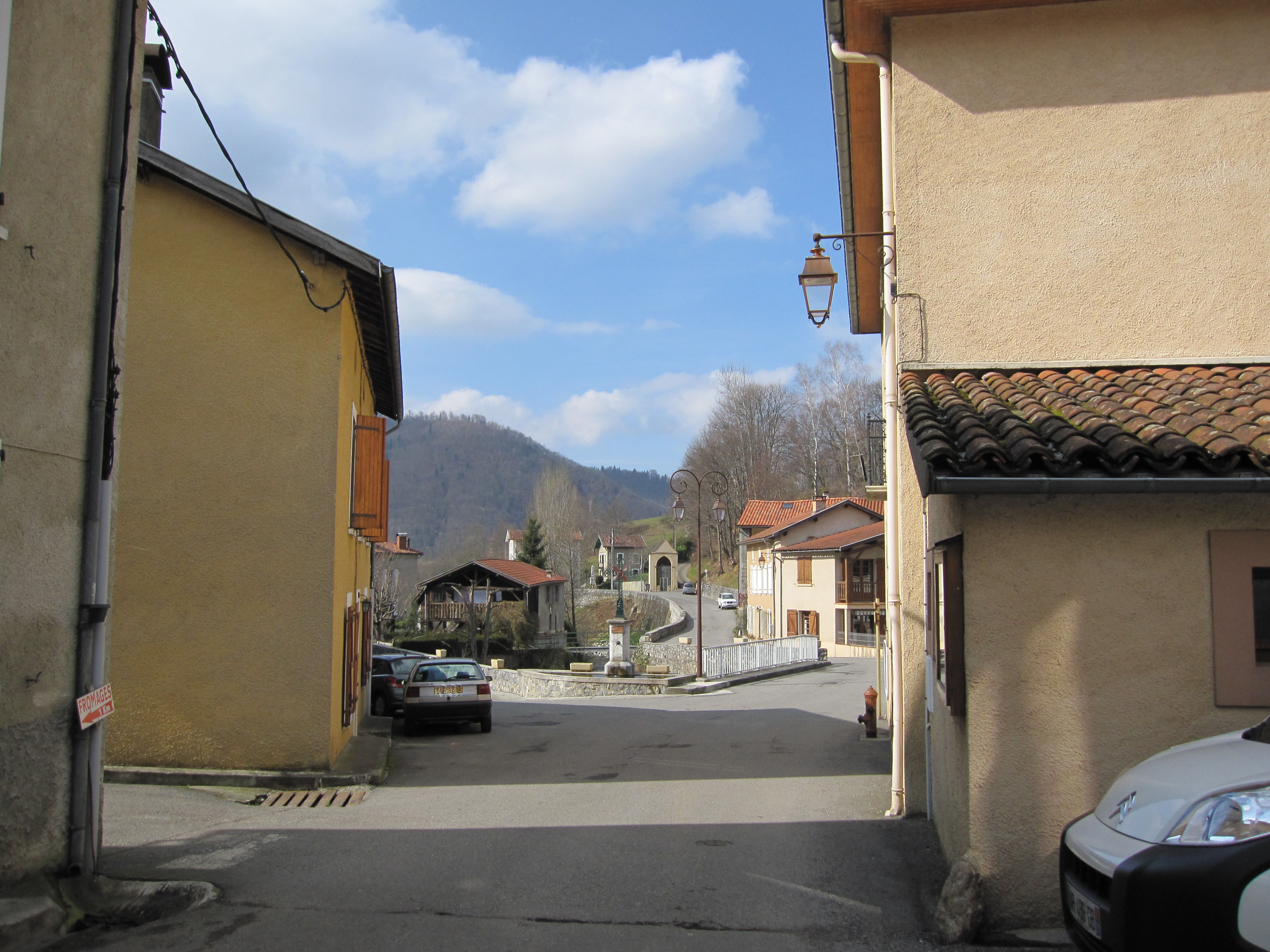
- A view within Milhas
- Location of Milhas
- Location within France Location within Occitanie
- Coordinates: 42°59′19″N 0°48′29″E
- Country: France
- Region: Occitania
- Department: Haute-Garonne
- Arrondissement: Saint-Gaudens
- Canton: Bagnères-de-Luchon

Government
  - Mayor (2020–2026): Patrick Capelli
- Area^{1}: 19.68 km^{2} (7.60 sq mi)
- Elevation: 475 m (1,558 ft)
- Highest elevation: 1,608 m (5,276 ft)
- Lowest elevation: 466 m (1,529 ft)
- Population (2023): 191
  - Density: 9.71/km^{2} (25.1/sq mi)
- Time zone: UTC+01:00 (CET)
  - Summer (DST): UTC+02:00 (CEST)
- INSEE/Postal code: 31342 /31160
- ^{1} French Land Register data, which excludes lakes, ponds, glaciers > 1 km^{2} (0.386 sq mi or 247 acres) and river estuaries.

Milhas is a commune in the Haute-Garonne department in southwestern France.

== Population ==
Historical population
| Year | Pop. | ±% p.a. |
|---|---|---|
| 1968 | 175 | — |
| 1975 | 171 | −0.33% |
| 1982 | 160 | −0.95% |
| 1990 | 158 | −0.16% |
| 1999 | 140 | −1.33% |
| 2007 | 170 | +2.46% |
| 2012 | 176 | +0.70% |
| 2017 | 177 | +0.11% |
| 2023 | 191 | +1.28% |
Source: INSEE

== See also ==
- Communes of the Haute-Garonne department
