= Portet-d'Aspet =

- Commune
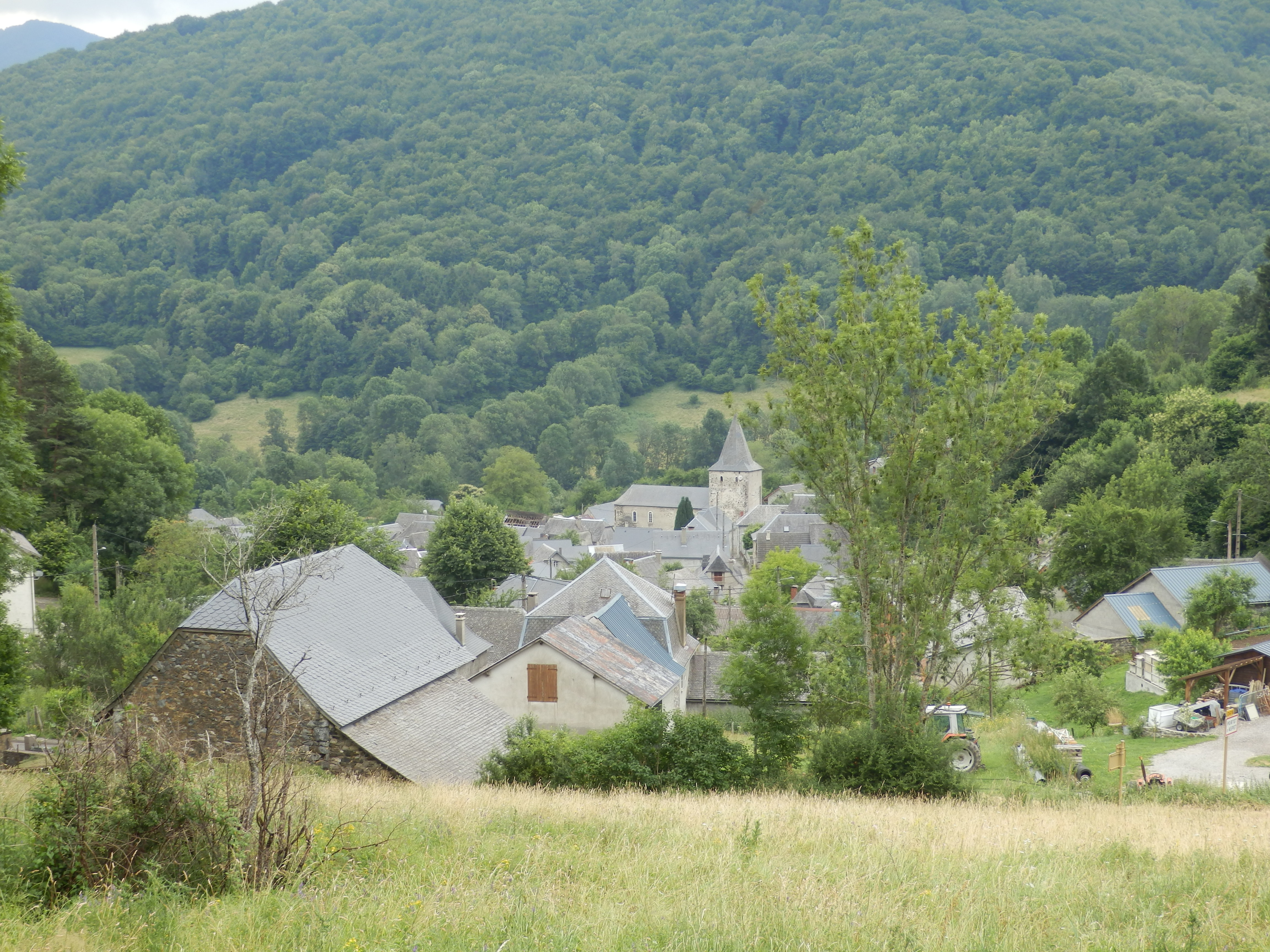
- A general view of Portet-d'Aspet
- Location of Portet-d'Aspet
- Location within France Location within Occitanie
- Coordinates: 42°56′29″N 0°51′58″E
- Country: France
- Region: Occitania
- Department: Haute-Garonne
- Arrondissement: Saint-Gaudens
- Canton: Bagnères-de-Luchon

Government
  - Mayor (2025–2026): Alain Coll
- Area^{1}: 13.93 km^{2} (5.38 sq mi)
- Elevation: 860 m (2,820 ft)
- Highest elevation: 1,574 m (5,164 ft)
- Lowest elevation: 680 m (2,230 ft)
- Population (2023): 63
  - Density: 4.5/km^{2} (12/sq mi)
- Time zone: UTC+01:00 (CET)
  - Summer (DST): UTC+02:00 (CEST)
- INSEE/Postal code: 31431 /31160
- ^{1} French Land Register data, which excludes lakes, ponds, glaciers > 1 km^{2} (0.386 sq mi or 247 acres) and river estuaries.

Portet-d'Aspet is a commune in the Haute-Garonne department in southwestern France.

== Population ==
Historical population
Year	Pop.	±% p.a.
1968	114	—
1975	68	−7.12%
1982	65	−0.64%
1990	75	+1.80%
1999	67	−1.25%
2007	72	+0.90%
2012	70	−0.56%
2017	64	−1.78%
2023	63	−0.26%
Source: INSEE

== See also ==
- Communes of the Haute-Garonne department
