= Arrondissement of Saint-Gaudens =

Coordinates: 43.10°N 0.72°E

Saint-Gaudens
- Arrondissement
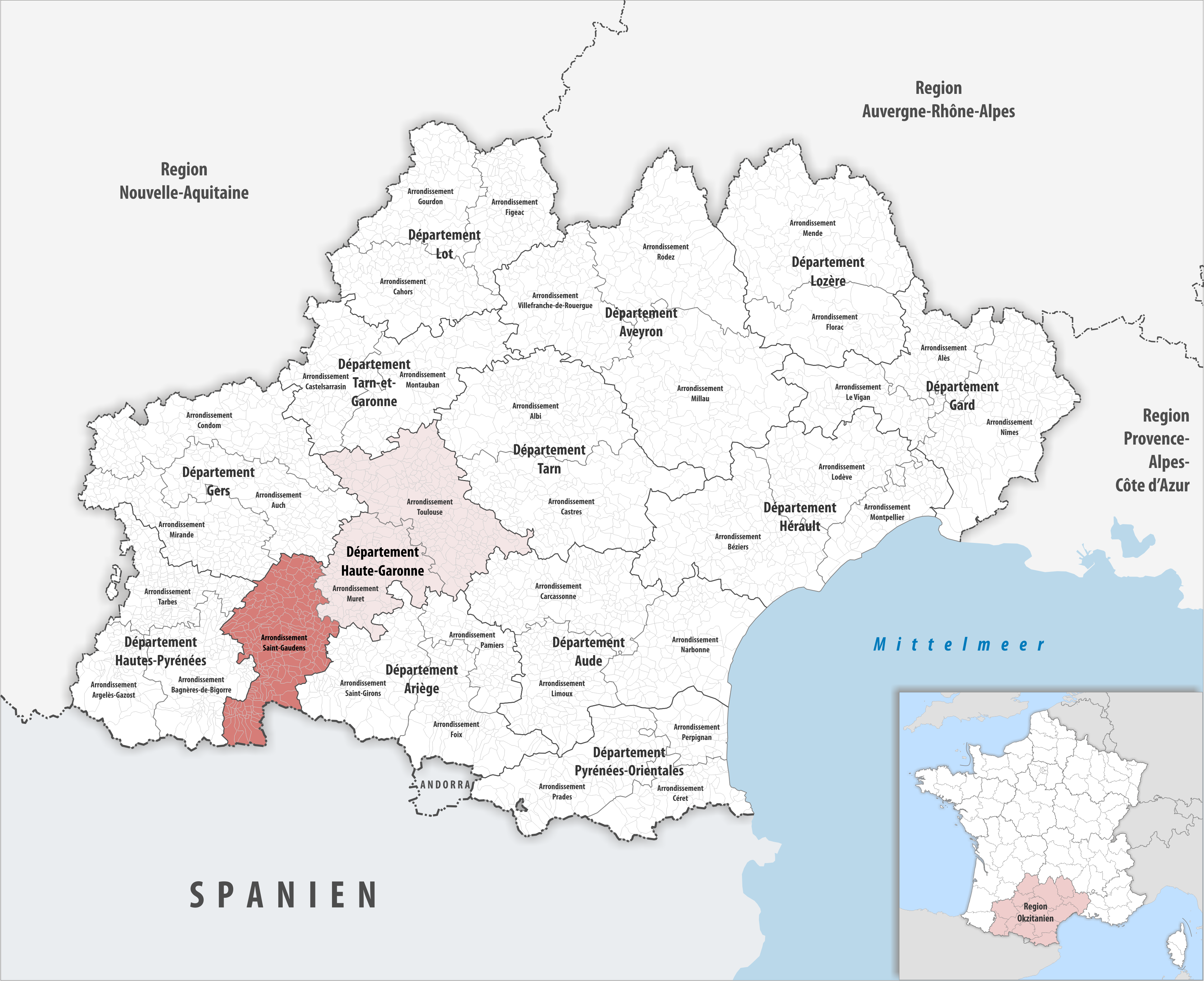
- Location within the region Occitanie
- Country: France
- Region: Occitania
- Department: Haute-Garonne
- No. of communes: {{{nbcomm}}}
- Area: 2,139.6 km^{2} (826.1 sq mi)
- Population (2023): 77,626
  - Density: 36.281/km^{2} (93.966/sq mi)
- INSEE code: 312

The arrondissement of Saint-Gaudens is an arrondissement of France in the Haute-Garonne department in the Occitanie region. It has 235 communes. Its population is 77,331 (2021), and its area is 2,139.6 km^{2} (826.1 sq mi).

== Composition ==
The communes of the arrondissement of Saint-Gaudens, and their INSEE codes, are:

1. Agassac (31001)
2. Alan (31005)
3. Ambax (31007)
4. Anan (31008)
5. Antichan-de-Frontignes (31009)
6. Antignac (31010)
7. Arbas (31011)
8. Arbon (31012)
9. Ardiège (31013)
10. Arguenos (31014)
11. Argut-Dessous (31015)
12. Arlos (31017)
13. Arnaud-Guilhem (31018)
14. Artigue (31019)
15. Aspet (31020)
16. Aspret-Sarrat (31021)
17. Aulon (31023)
18. Aurignac (31028)
19. Ausseing (31030)
20. Ausson (31031)
21. Auzas (31034)
22. Bachas (31039)
23. Bachos (31040)
24. Bagiry (31041)
25. Bagnères-de-Luchon (31042)
26. Balesta (31043)
27. Barbazan (31045)
28. Baren (31046)
29. Beauchalot (31050)
30. Belbèze-en-Comminges (31059)
31. Benque (31063)
32. Benque-Dessous-et-Dessus (31064)
33. Bezins-Garraux (31067)
34. Billière (31068)
35. Binos (31590)
36. Blajan (31070)
37. Boissède (31072)
38. Bordes-de-Rivière (31076)
39. Boudrac (31078)
40. Boulogne-sur-Gesse (31080)
41. Bourg-d'Oueil (31081)
42. Boussan (31083)
43. Boutx (31085)
44. Bouzin (31086)
45. Burgalays (31092)
46. Cabanac-Cazaux (31095)
47. Cardeilhac (31108)
48. Cassagnabère-Tournas (31109)
49. Cassagne (31110)
50. Castagnède (31112)
51. Castelbiague (31114)
52. Castelgaillard (31115)
53. Castéra-Vignoles (31121)
54. Castillon-de-Larboust (31123)
55. Castillon-de-Saint-Martory (31124)
56. Cathervielle (31125)
57. Caubous (31127)
58. Cazac (31593)
59. Cazarilh-Laspènes (31129)
60. Cazaril-Tambourès (31130)
61. Cazaunous (31131)
62. Cazaux-Layrisse (31132)
63. Cazeaux-de-Larboust (31133)
64. Cazeneuve-Montaut (31134)
65. Charlas (31138)
66. Chaum (31139)
67. Chein-Dessus (31140)
68. Ciadoux (31141)
69. Cier-de-Luchon (31142)
70. Cier-de-Rivière (31143)
71. Cierp-Gaud (31144)
72. Cirès (31146)
73. Clarac (31147)
74. Coueilles (31152)
75. Couret (31155)
76. Cuguron (31158)
77. Le Cuing (31159)
78. Encausse-les-Thermes (31167)
79. Eoux (31168)
80. Escanecrabe (31170)
81. Escoulis (31591)
82. Esparron (31172)
83. Estadens (31174)
84. Estancarbon (31175)
85. Esténos (31176)
86. Eup (31177)
87. Fabas (31178)
88. Figarol (31183)
89. Fos (31190)
90. Fougaron (31191)
91. Francazal (31195)
92. Franquevielle (31197)
93. Le Fréchet (31198)
94. Fronsac (31199)
95. Frontignan-de-Comminges (31200)
96. Frontignan-Savès (31201)
97. Galié (31207)
98. Ganties (31208)
99. Garin (31213)
100. Génos (31217)
101. Gensac-de-Boulogne (31218)
102. Gouaux-de-Larboust (31221)
103. Gouaux-de-Luchon (31222)
104. Goudex (31223)
105. Gourdan-Polignan (31224)
106. Guran (31235)
107. Herran (31236)
108. His (31237)
109. Huos (31238)
110. L'Isle-en-Dodon (31239)
111. Izaut-de-l'Hôtel (31241)
112. Jurvielle (31242)
113. Juzet-d'Izaut (31245)
114. Juzet-de-Luchon (31244)
115. Labarthe-Inard (31246)
116. Labarthe-Rivière (31247)
117. Labastide-Paumès (31251)
118. Labroquère (31255)
119. Laffite-Toupière (31260)
120. Lalouret-Laffiteau (31268)
121. Landorthe (31270)
122. Larcan (31274)
123. Larroque (31276)
124. Latoue (31278)
125. Lécussan (31289)
126. Lège (31290)
127. Lespiteau (31294)
128. Lespugue (31295)
129. Lestelle-de-Saint-Martory (31296)
130. Lieoux (31300)
131. Lilhac (31301)
132. Lodes (31302)
133. Loudet (31305)
134. Lourde (31306)
135. Luscan (31308)
136. Malvezie (31313)
137. Mancioux (31314)
138. Mane (31315)
139. Marignac (31316)
140. Marsoulas (31321)
141. Martisserre (31322)
142. Martres-de-Rivière (31323)
143. Mauvezin (31333)
144. Mayrègne (31335)
145. Mazères-sur-Salat (31336)
146. Melles (31337)
147. Milhas (31342)
148. Mirambeau (31343)
149. Miramont-de-Comminges (31344)
150. Molas (31347)
151. Moncaup (31348)
152. Mondilhan (31350)
153. Mont-de-Galié (31369)
154. Montastruc-de-Salies (31357)
155. Montauban-de-Luchon (31360)
156. Montbernard (31363)
157. Montespan (31372)
158. Montesquieu-Guittaut (31373)
159. Montgaillard-de-Salies (31376)
160. Montgaillard-sur-Save (31378)
161. Montmaurin (31385)
162. Montoulieu-Saint-Bernard (31386)
163. Montréjeau (31390)
164. Montsaunès (31391)
165. Moustajon (31394)
166. Nénigan (31397)
167. Nizan-Gesse (31398)
168. Oô (31404)
169. Ore (31405)
170. Payssous (31408)
171. Péguilhan (31412)
172. Peyrissas (31414)
173. Peyrouzet (31415)
174. Pointis-de-Rivière (31426)
175. Pointis-Inard (31427)
176. Ponlat-Taillebourg (31430)
177. Portet-d'Aspet (31431)
178. Portet-de-Luchon (31432)
179. Poubeau (31434)
180. Proupiary (31440)
181. Puymaurin (31443)
182. Razecueillé (31447)
183. Régades (31449)
184. Rieucazé (31452)
185. Riolas (31456)
186. Roquefort-sur-Garonne (31457)
187. Rouède (31461)
188. Saccourvielle (31465)
189. Saint-André (31468)
190. Saint-Aventin (31470)
191. Saint-Béat-Lez (31471)
192. Saint-Bertrand-de-Comminges (31472)
193. Saint-Élix-Séglan (31477)
194. Saint-Ferréol-de-Comminges (31479)
195. Saint-Frajou (31482)
196. Saint-Gaudens (31483)
197. Saint-Ignan (31487)
198. Saint-Lary-Boujean (31493)
199. Saint-Laurent (31494)
200. Saint-Loup-en-Comminges (31498)
201. Saint-Mamet (31500)
202. Saint-Marcet (31502)
203. Saint-Martory (31503)
204. Saint-Médard (31504)
205. Saint-Paul-d'Oueil (31508)
206. Saint-Pé-d'Ardet (31509)
207. Saint-Pé-Delbosc (31510)
208. Saint-Plancard (31513)
209. Saleich (31521)
210. Salerm (31522)
211. Salies-du-Salat (31523)
212. Salles-et-Pratviel (31524)
213. Saman (31528)
214. Samouillan (31529)
215. Sarrecave (31531)
216. Sarremezan (31532)
217. Sauveterre-de-Comminges (31535)
218. Saux-et-Pomarède (31536)
219. Savarthès (31537)
220. Sédeilhac (31539)
221. Seilhan (31542)
222. Sengouagnet (31544)
223. Sepx (31545)
224. Signac (31548)
225. Sode (31549)
226. Soueich (31550)
227. Terrebasse (31552)
228. Touille (31554)
229. Les Tourreilles (31556)
230. Trébons-de-Luchon (31559)
231. Urau (31562)
232. Valcabrère (31564)
233. Valentine (31565)
234. Villeneuve-de-Rivière (31585)
235. Villeneuve-Lécussan (31586)

== History ==
The arrondissement of Saint-Gaudens was created in 1800.

As a result of the reorganisation of the cantons of France which came into effect in 2015, the borders of the cantons are no longer related to the borders of the arrondissements. The cantons of the arrondissement of Saint-Gaudens were, as of January 2015:

1. Aspet
2. Aurignac
3. Bagnères-de-Luchon
4. Barbazan
5. Boulogne-sur-Gesse
6. L'Isle-en-Dodon
7. Montréjeau
8. Saint-Béat
9. Saint-Gaudens
10. Saint-Martory
11. Salies-du-Salat
