= Cirès =

- Commune
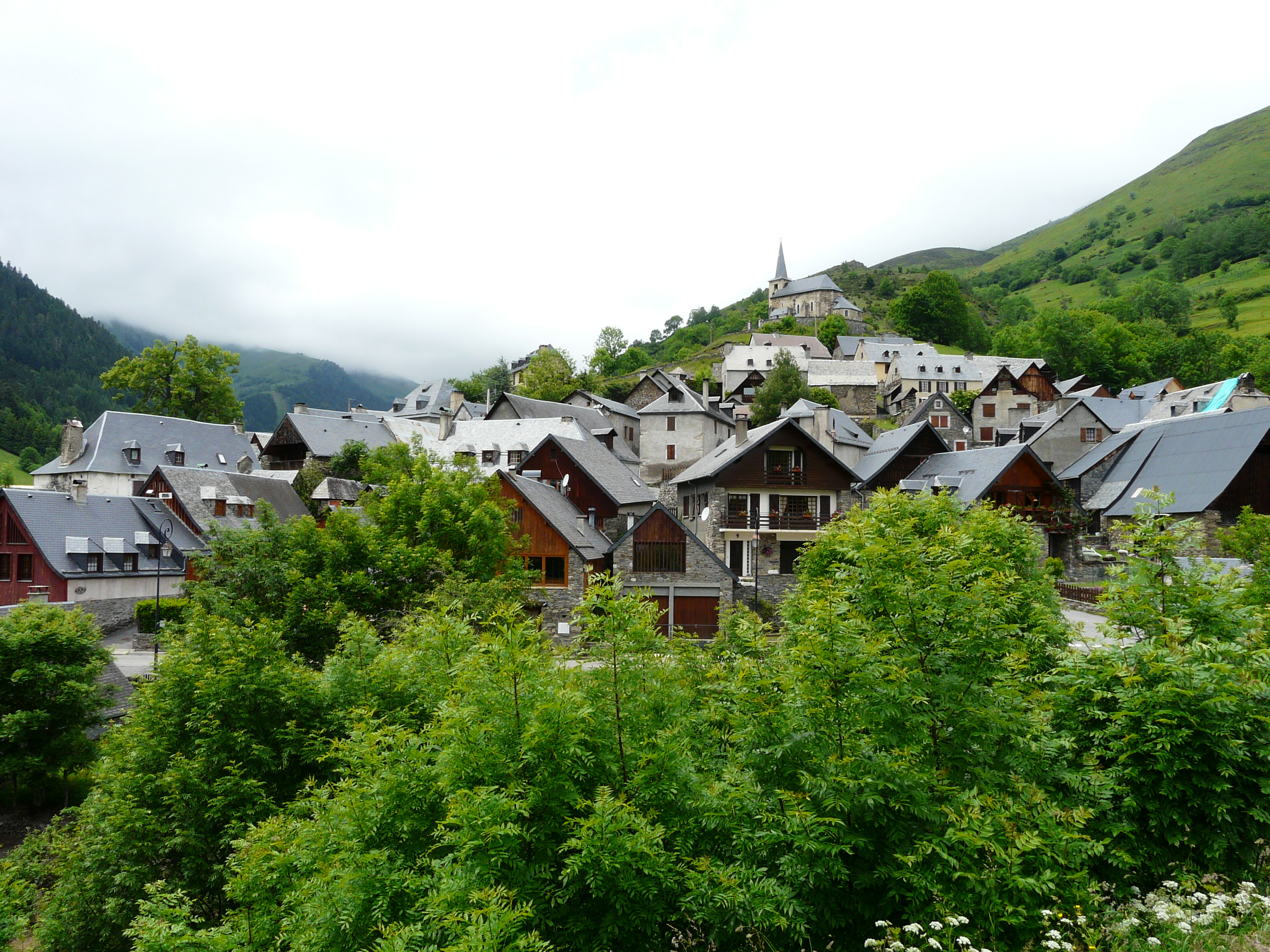
- A general view of Cirès
- Location of Cirès
- Location within France Location within Occitanie
- Coordinates: 42°51′11″N 0°31′06″E
- Country: France
- Region: Occitania
- Department: Haute-Garonne
- Arrondissement: Saint-Gaudens
- Canton: Bagnères-de-Luchon
- Intercommunality: Pyrénées Haut-Garonnaises

Government
  - Mayor (2020–2026): Laurent Bruna
- Area^{1}: 5.11 km^{2} (1.97 sq mi)
- Elevation: 1,300 m (4,300 ft)
- Highest elevation: 1,971 m (6,467 ft)
- Lowest elevation: 1,235 m (4,052 ft)
- Population (2023): 9
  - Density: 1.8/km^{2} (4.6/sq mi)
- Time zone: UTC+01:00 (CET)
  - Summer (DST): UTC+02:00 (CEST)
- INSEE/Postal code: 31146 /31110
- ^{1} French Land Register data, which excludes lakes, ponds, glaciers > 1 km^{2} (0.386 sq mi or 247 acres) and river estuaries.

Cirès (French pronunciation: [siʁɛs]; Occitan: Cirés) is a commune in the Haute-Garonne department in southwestern France.

== Population ==
Historical population
Year	Pop.	±% p.a.
1968	21	—
1975	21	+0.00%
1982	11	−8.82%
1990	11	+0.00%
1999	8	−3.48%
2007	12	+5.20%
2012	12	+0.00%
2017	13	+1.61%
2023	9	−5.94%
Source: INSEE

== See also ==
- Communes of the Haute-Garonne department
