= Castillon-de-Saint-Martory =

- Commune
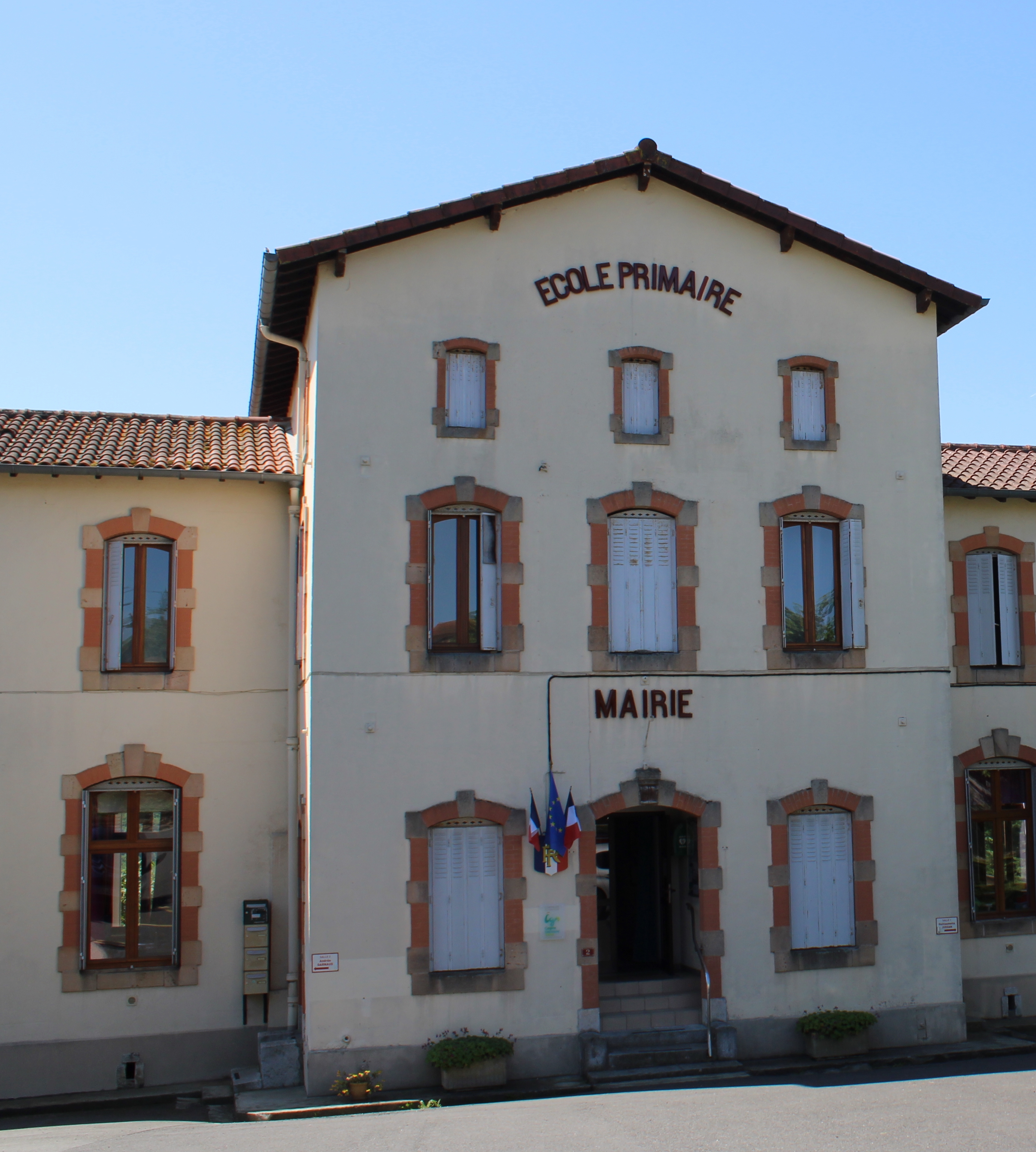
- Castillon-de-Saint-Martory Town hall
- Location of Castillon-de-Saint-Martory
- Location within France Location within Occitanie
- Coordinates: 43°08′07″N 0°51′35″E
- Country: France
- Region: Occitania
- Department: Haute-Garonne
- Arrondissement: Saint-Gaudens
- Canton: Bagnères-de-Luchon
- Intercommunality: Cagire Garonne Salat

Government
  - Mayor (2020–2026): Patrick Sudre
- Area^{1}: 10.98 km^{2} (4.24 sq mi)
- Elevation: 400 m (1,300 ft)
- Highest elevation: 488 m (1,601 ft)
- Lowest elevation: 283 m (928 ft)
- Population (2023): 398
  - Density: 36.2/km^{2} (93.9/sq mi)
- Time zone: UTC+01:00 (CET)
  - Summer (DST): UTC+02:00 (CEST)
- INSEE/Postal code: 31124 /31360
- ^{1} French Land Register data, which excludes lakes, ponds, glaciers > 1 km^{2} (0.386 sq mi or 247 acres) and river estuaries.

Castillon-de-Saint-Martory (French pronunciation: [kastijɔ̃ də sɛ̃ maʁtɔʁi]; Occitan: Castilhon de Sent Martòri) is a commune in the Haute-Garonne department in the Occitanie region in southwestern France.

== Population ==
Historical population
Year	Pop.	±% p.a.
1968	217	—
1975	216	−0.07%
1982	195	−1.45%
1990	240	+2.63%
1999	259	+0.85%
2007	300	+1.85%
2012	355	+3.42%
2017	382	+1.48%
2023	398	+0.69%
Source: INSEE

== See also ==
- Communes of the Haute-Garonne department
