= Salles-et-Pratviel =

- Commune
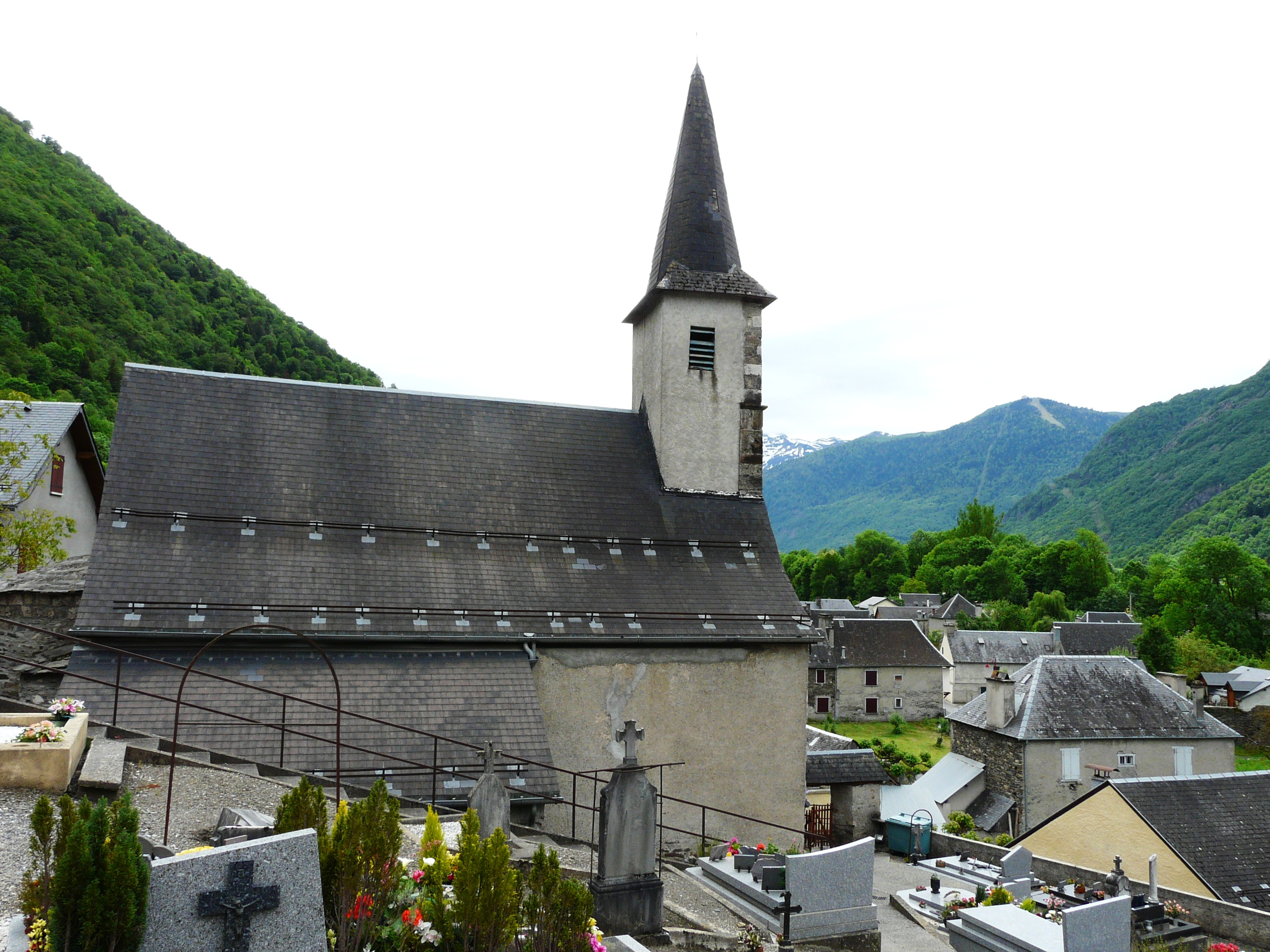
- The church and surroundings in Salles-et-Pratviel
- Location of Salles-et-Pratviel
- Location within France Location within Occitanie
- Coordinates: 42°49′51″N 0°36′23″E
- Country: France
- Region: Occitania
- Department: Haute-Garonne
- Arrondissement: Saint-Gaudens
- Canton: Bagnères-de-Luchon

Government
  - Mayor (2020–2026): Alain Puente
- Area^{1}: 2.12 km^{2} (0.82 sq mi)
- Elevation: 625 m (2,051 ft)
- Highest elevation: 982 m (3,222 ft)
- Lowest elevation: 591 m (1,939 ft)
- Population (2023): 129
  - Density: 60.8/km^{2} (158/sq mi)
- Time zone: UTC+01:00 (CET)
  - Summer (DST): UTC+02:00 (CEST)
- INSEE/Postal code: 31524 /31110
- ^{1} French Land Register data, which excludes lakes, ponds, glaciers > 1 km^{2} (0.386 sq mi or 247 acres) and river estuaries.

Salles-et-Pratviel (French pronunciation: [sal e pʁatvjɛl]; Occitan: Sales e Pratvièlh) is a commune in the Haute-Garonne department in southwestern France.

== Population ==
Historical population
| Year | Pop. | ±% p.a. |
|---|---|---|
| 1968 | 88 | — |
| 1975 | 98 | +1.55% |
| 1982 | 90 | −1.21% |
| 1990 | 129 | +4.60% |
| 1999 | 119 | −0.89% |
| 2007 | 128 | +0.92% |
| 2012 | 144 | +2.38% |
| 2017 | 133 | −1.58% |
| 2023 | 129 | −0.51% |
Source: INSEE

== See also ==
- Communes of the Haute-Garonne department
