= Moncaup, Haute-Garonne =

Moncaup
- Commune
- Location of Moncaup
- Location within France Location within Occitanie
- Coordinates: 42°58′44″N 0°42′26″E
- Country: France
- Region: Occitania
- Department: Haute-Garonne
- Arrondissement: Saint-Gaudens
- Canton: Bagnères-de-Luchon

Government
  - Mayor (2020–2026): Daniel Weissberg
- Area^{1}: 7.14 km^{2} (2.76 sq mi)
- Elevation: 571 m (1,873 ft)
- Highest elevation: 1,788 m (5,866 ft)
- Lowest elevation: 508 m (1,667 ft)
- Population (2023): 37
  - Density: 5.2/km^{2} (13/sq mi)
- Time zone: UTC+01:00 (CET)
  - Summer (DST): UTC+02:00 (CEST)
- INSEE/Postal code: 31348 /31160
- ^{1} French Land Register data, which excludes lakes, ponds, glaciers > 1 km^{2} (0.386 sq mi or 247 acres) and river estuaries.

Moncaup is a commune in the Haute-Garonne department in southwestern France.

== Population ==
Historical population
| Year | Pop. | ±% p.a. |
|---|---|---|
| 1968 | 66 | — |
| 1975 | 39 | −7.24% |
| 1982 | 38 | −0.37% |
| 1990 | 33 | −1.75% |
| 1999 | 26 | −2.61% |
| 2007 | 30 | +1.80% |
| 2012 | 32 | +1.30% |
| 2017 | 39 | +4.04% |
| 2023 | 37 | −0.87% |
Source: INSEE

== See also ==
- Communes of the Haute-Garonne department
