= Belbèze-en-Comminges =

- Commune
- Location of Belbèze-en-Comminges
- Location within France Location within Occitanie
- Coordinates: 43°08′01″N 1°01′38″E
- Country: France
- Region: Occitania
- Department: Haute-Garonne
- Arrondissement: Saint-Gaudens
- Canton: Bagnères-de-Luchon
- Intercommunality: Cagire Garonne Salat

Government
  - Mayor (2020–2026): Raymond Joube
- Area^{1}: 9.56 km^{2} (3.69 sq mi)
- Elevation: 407 m (1,335 ft)
- Highest elevation: 601 m (1,972 ft)
- Lowest elevation: 320 m (1,050 ft)
- Population (2023): 108
  - Density: 11.3/km^{2} (29.3/sq mi)
- Time zone: UTC+01:00 (CET)
  - Summer (DST): UTC+02:00 (CEST)
- INSEE/Postal code: 31059 /31260
- ^{1} French Land Register data, which excludes lakes, ponds, glaciers > 1 km^{2} (0.386 sq mi or 247 acres) and river estuaries.

Belbèze-en-Comminges (French pronunciation: [bɛlbɛz ɑ̃ kɔmɛ̃ʒ], literally Belbèze in Comminges; Occitan: Bèthvéder de Comenge) is a commune in the Haute-Garonne department in southwestern France.

== Population ==
Historical population
Year	Pop.	±% p.a.
1968	139	—
1975	125	−1.51%
1982	130	+0.56%
1990	108	−2.29%
1999	116	+0.80%
2007	108	−0.89%
2012	108	+0.00%
2017	113	+0.91%
2023	108	−0.75%
Source: INSEE

== History ==
The village's first same-sex marriage took place on September 28, 2024.

== See also ==
- Communes of the Haute-Garonne department
