= Caubous, Haute-Garonne =

Caubous
- Commune
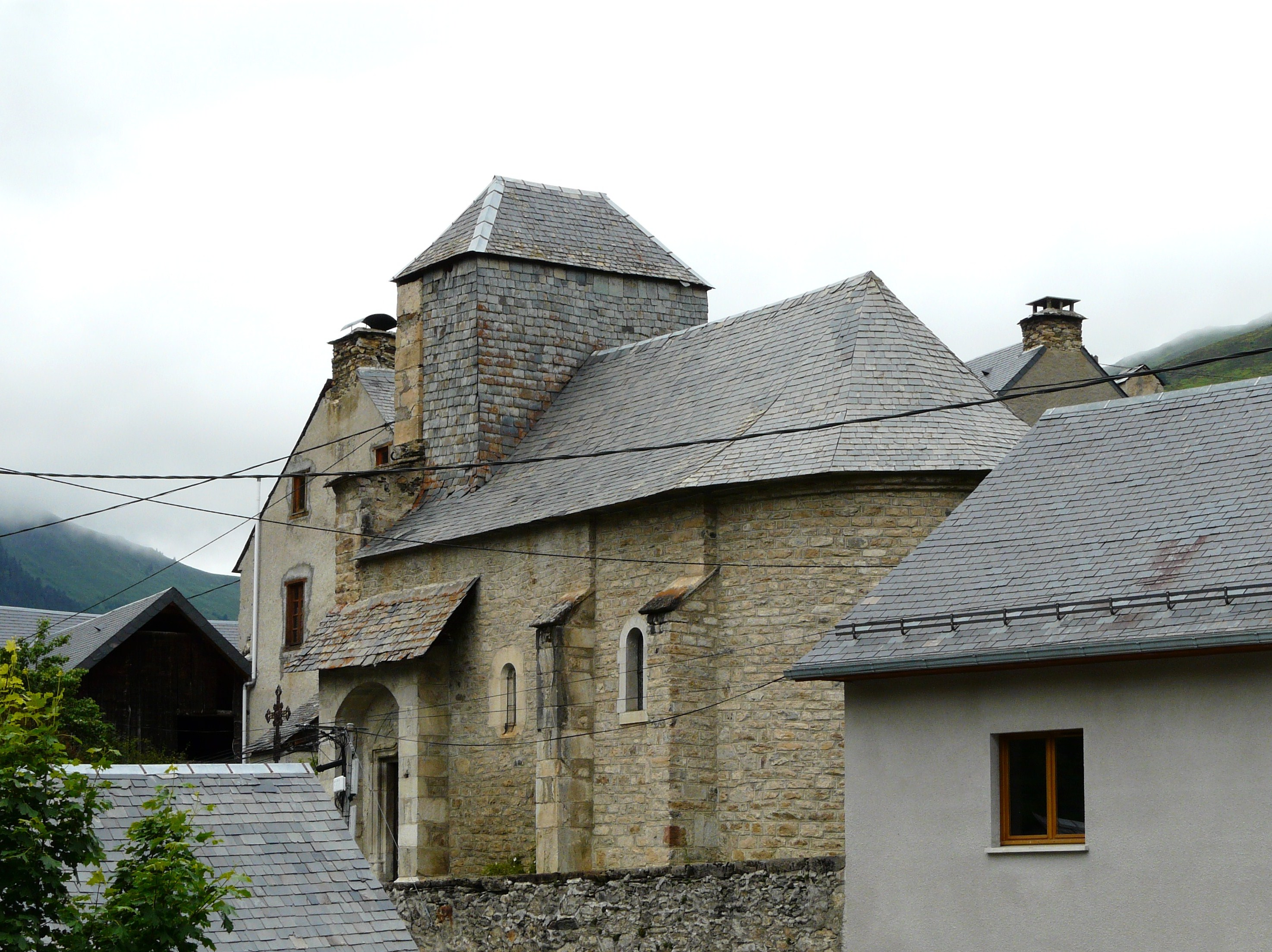
- The church in Caubous
- Location of Caubous
- Location within France Location within Occitanie
- Coordinates: 42°51′05″N 0°31′23″E
- Country: France
- Region: Occitania
- Department: Haute-Garonne
- Arrondissement: Saint-Gaudens
- Canton: Bagnères-de-Luchon
- Intercommunality: Pyrénées Haut-Garonnaises

Government
  - Mayor (2020–2026): José Gouzy
- Area^{1}: 3.78 km^{2} (1.46 sq mi)
- Elevation: 1,255 m (4,117 ft)
- Highest elevation: 1,918 m (6,293 ft)
- Lowest elevation: 1,199 m (3,934 ft)
- Population (2023): 3
  - Density: 0.79/km^{2} (2.1/sq mi)
- Time zone: UTC+01:00 (CET)
  - Summer (DST): UTC+02:00 (CEST)
- INSEE/Postal code: 31127 /31110
- ^{1} French Land Register data, which excludes lakes, ponds, glaciers > 1 km^{2} (0.386 sq mi or 247 acres) and river estuaries.

Caubous (Occitan: Caubos) is a commune in the Haute-Garonne department in southwestern France.

With a population of three inhabitants in 2023, it is the least populated commune in the department.

== Population ==
Historical population
Year	Pop.	±% p.a.
1968	11	—
1975	12	+1.25%
1982	12	+0.00%
1990	7	−6.52%
1999	12	+6.17%
2007	7	−6.52%
2012	5	−6.51%
2017	4	−4.36%
2023	3	−4.68%
Source: INSEE

== See also ==
- Communes of the Haute-Garonne department
