= Cazeaux-de-Larboust =

- Commune
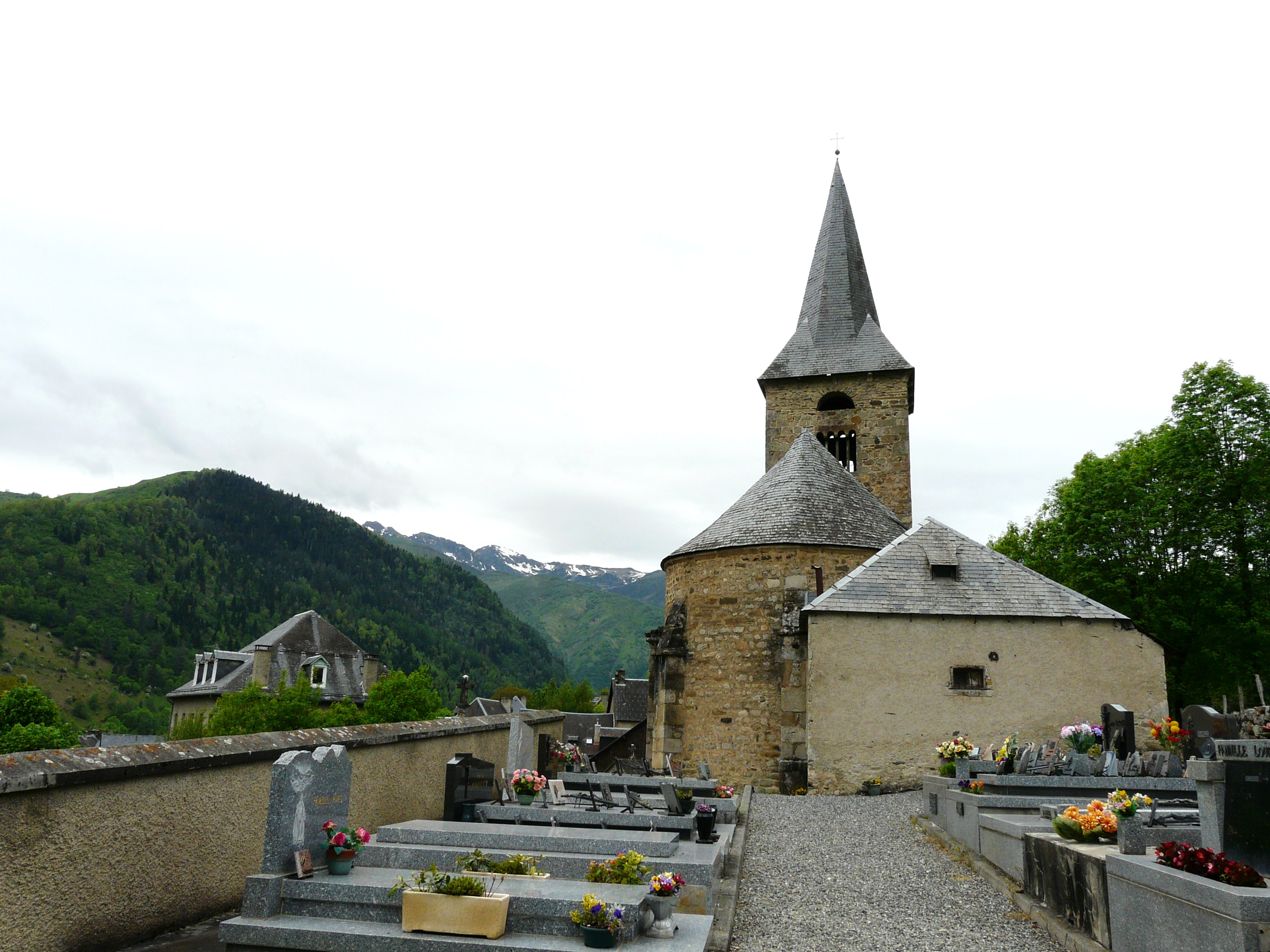
- The church in Cazeaux-de-Larboust
- Location of Cazeaux-de-Larboust
- Location within France Location within Occitanie
- Coordinates: 42°48′26″N 0°31′53″E
- Country: France
- Region: Occitania
- Department: Haute-Garonne
- Arrondissement: Saint-Gaudens
- Canton: Bagnères-de-Luchon

Government
  - Mayor (2020–2026): Simon Escole
- Area^{1}: 19.14 km^{2} (7.39 sq mi)
- Elevation: 995 m (3,264 ft)
- Highest elevation: 3,110 m (10,200 ft)
- Lowest elevation: 914 m (2,999 ft)
- Population (2023): 88
  - Density: 4.6/km^{2} (12/sq mi)
- Time zone: UTC+01:00 (CET)
  - Summer (DST): UTC+02:00 (CEST)
- INSEE/Postal code: 31133 /31110
- ^{1} French Land Register data, which excludes lakes, ponds, glaciers > 1 km^{2} (0.386 sq mi or 247 acres) and river estuaries.

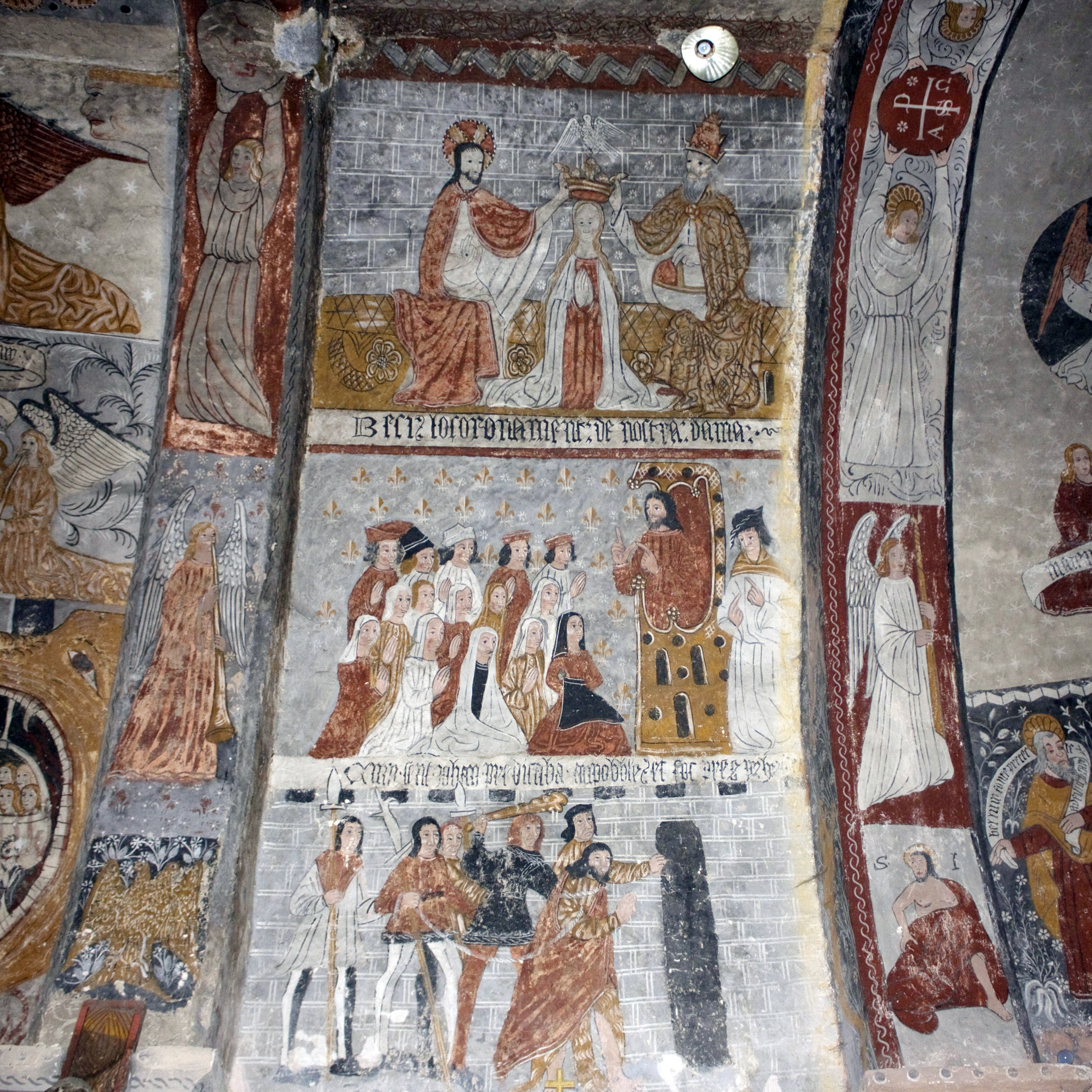
Frescoes in the church at Cazeaux-de-Larboust

Cazeaux-de-Larboust is a commune in the Haute-Garonne department in southwestern France.

== Population ==
Historical population
Year	Pop.	±% p.a.
1968	89	—
1975	62	−5.03%
1982	65	+0.68%
1990	72	+1.29%
1999	81	+1.32%
2007	91	+1.47%
2012	95	+0.86%
2017	97	+0.42%
2023	88	−1.61%
Source: INSEE

== See also ==
- Communes of the Haute-Garonne department
