= Luscan =

- Commune
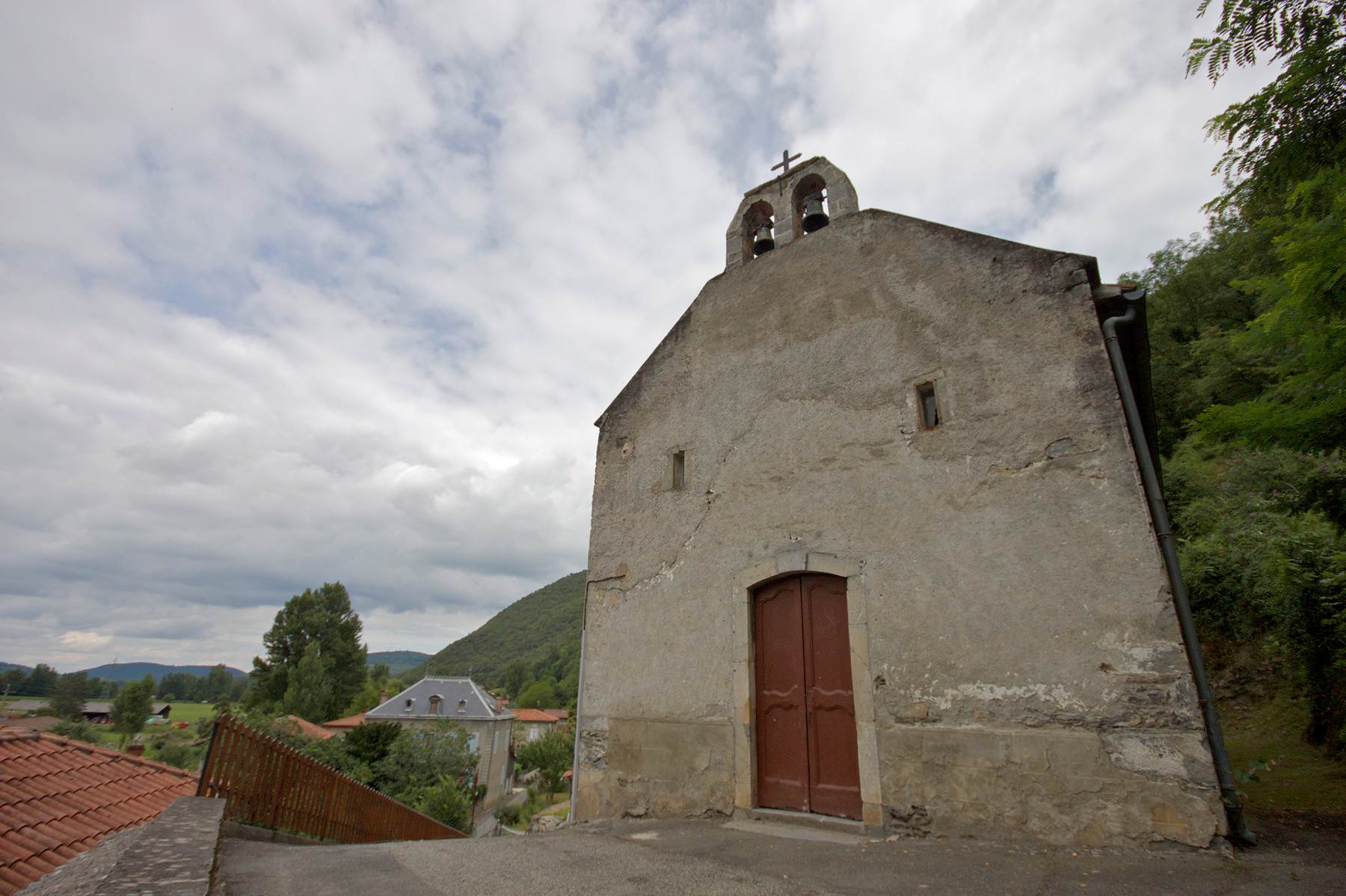
- The church in Luscan
- Location of Luscan
- Location within France Location within Occitanie
- Coordinates: 43°00′46″N 0°37′24″E
- Country: France
- Region: Occitania
- Department: Haute-Garonne
- Arrondissement: Saint-Gaudens
- Canton: Bagnères-de-Luchon

Government
  - Mayor (2020–2026): Marie-Thérèse Castex
- Area^{1}: 3.33 km^{2} (1.29 sq mi)
- Elevation: 400 m (1,300 ft)
- Highest elevation: 941 m (3,087 ft)
- Lowest elevation: 443 m (1,453 ft)
- Population (2023): 46
  - Density: 14/km^{2} (36/sq mi)
- Time zone: UTC+01:00 (CET)
  - Summer (DST): UTC+02:00 (CEST)
- INSEE/Postal code: 31308 /31510
- ^{1} French Land Register data, which excludes lakes, ponds, glaciers > 1 km^{2} (0.386 sq mi or 247 acres) and river estuaries.

Luscan (French pronunciation: [lyskɑ̃]) is a commune in the Haute-Garonne department in southwestern France.

== Population ==
Historical population
Year	Pop.	±% p.a.
1968	72	—
1975	75	+0.58%
1982	81	+1.11%
1990	73	−1.29%
1999	54	−3.29%
2007	63	+1.95%
2012	66	+0.93%
2017	55	−3.58%
2023	46	−2.93%
Source: INSEE

== See also ==
- Communes of the Haute-Garonne department
