= Fougaron =

- Commune
- Location of Fougaron
- Location within France Location within Occitanie
- Coordinates: 42°59′16″N 0°55′56″E
- Country: France
- Region: Occitania
- Department: Haute-Garonne
- Arrondissement: Saint-Gaudens
- Canton: Bagnères-de-Luchon

Government
  - Mayor (2020–2026): Jean-Pierre Escaig
- Area^{1}: 9.14 km^{2} (3.53 sq mi)
- Elevation: 498 m (1,634 ft)
- Highest elevation: 1,416 m (4,646 ft)
- Lowest elevation: 473 m (1,552 ft)
- Population (2023): 109
  - Density: 11.9/km^{2} (30.9/sq mi)
- Time zone: UTC+01:00 (CET)
  - Summer (DST): UTC+02:00 (CEST)
- INSEE/Postal code: 31191 /31160
- ^{1} French Land Register data, which excludes lakes, ponds, glaciers > 1 km^{2} (0.386 sq mi or 247 acres) and river estuaries.

Fougaron (French pronunciation: [fuɡaʁɔ̃]; Occitan: Hogaron) is a commune in the Haute-Garonne department in southwestern France.

== Population ==
Historical population
Year	Pop.	±% p.a.
1968	93	—
1975	73	−3.40%
1982	85	+2.20%
1990	62	−3.87%
1999	73	+1.83%
2007	90	+2.65%
2012	103	+2.74%
2017	95	−1.60%
2023	109	+2.32%
Source: INSEE

== See also ==
- Communes of the Haute-Garonne department
