= Bagiry =

- Commune
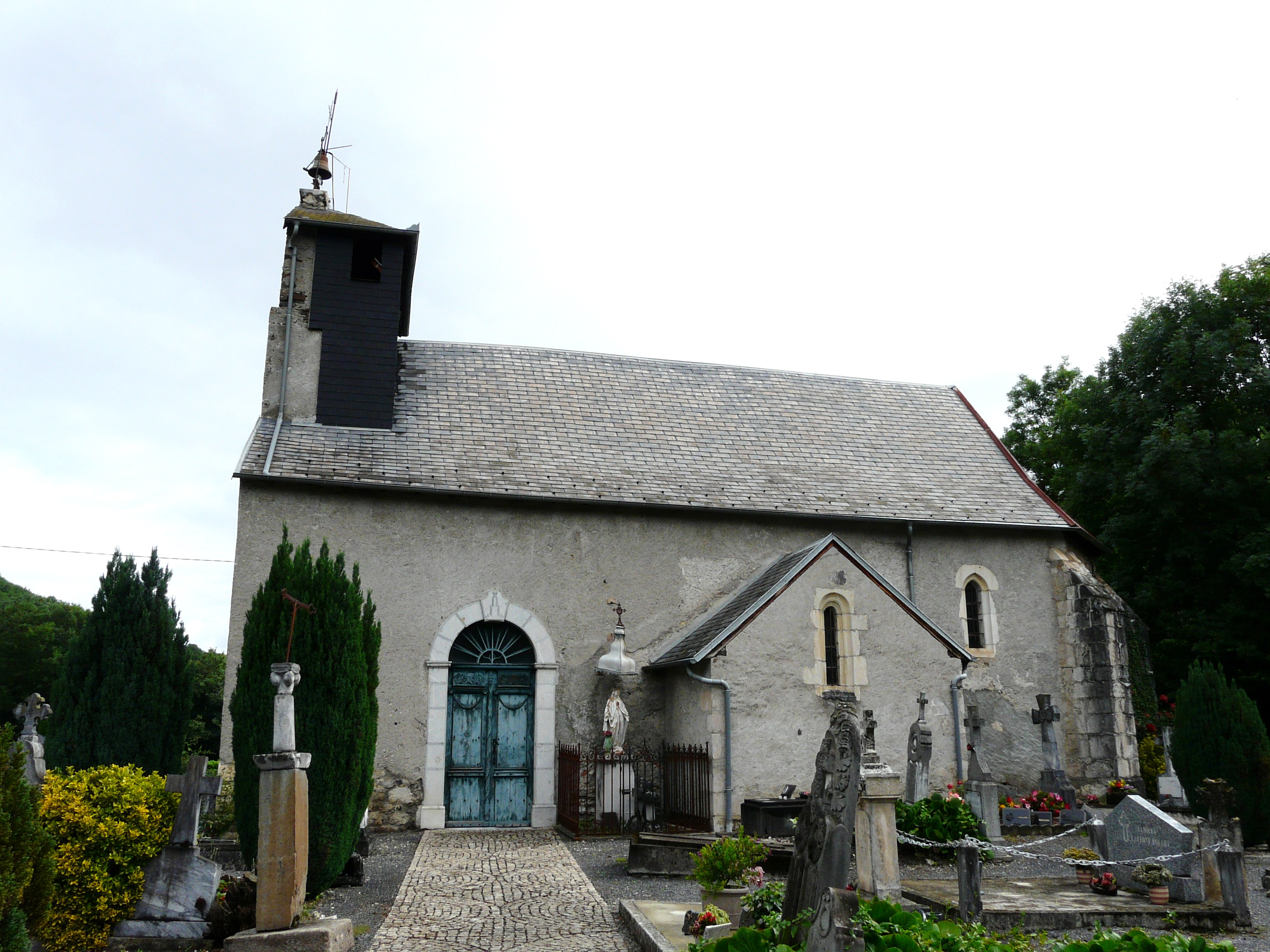
- The church in Bagiry
- Location of Bagiry
- Location within France Location within Occitanie
- Coordinates: 42°58′43″N 0°37′36″E
- Country: France
- Region: Occitania
- Department: Haute-Garonne
- Arrondissement: Saint-Gaudens
- Canton: Bagnères-de-Luchon

Government
  - Mayor (2022–2026): Alexandra Clement
- Area^{1}: 2.78 km^{2} (1.07 sq mi)
- Elevation: 457 m (1,499 ft)
- Highest elevation: 1,002 m (3,287 ft)
- Lowest elevation: 449 m (1,473 ft)
- Population (2023): 105
  - Density: 37.8/km^{2} (97.8/sq mi)
- Time zone: UTC+01:00 (CET)
  - Summer (DST): UTC+02:00 (CEST)
- INSEE/Postal code: 31041 /31510
- ^{1} French Land Register data, which excludes lakes, ponds, glaciers > 1 km^{2} (0.386 sq mi or 247 acres) and river estuaries.

Bagiry (French pronunciation: [baʒiʁi]; Occitan: Bagiri) is a commune in the Haute-Garonne department in southwestern France.

== Population ==
Historical population
Year	Pop.	±% p.a.
1968	110	—
1975	111	+0.13%
1982	114	+0.38%
1990	88	−3.18%
1999	77	−1.47%
2007	80	+0.48%
2012	86	+1.46%
2017	112	+5.43%
2023	105	−1.07%
Source: INSEE

== See also ==
- Communes of the Haute-Garonne department
