= His, Haute-Garonne =

His
- Commune
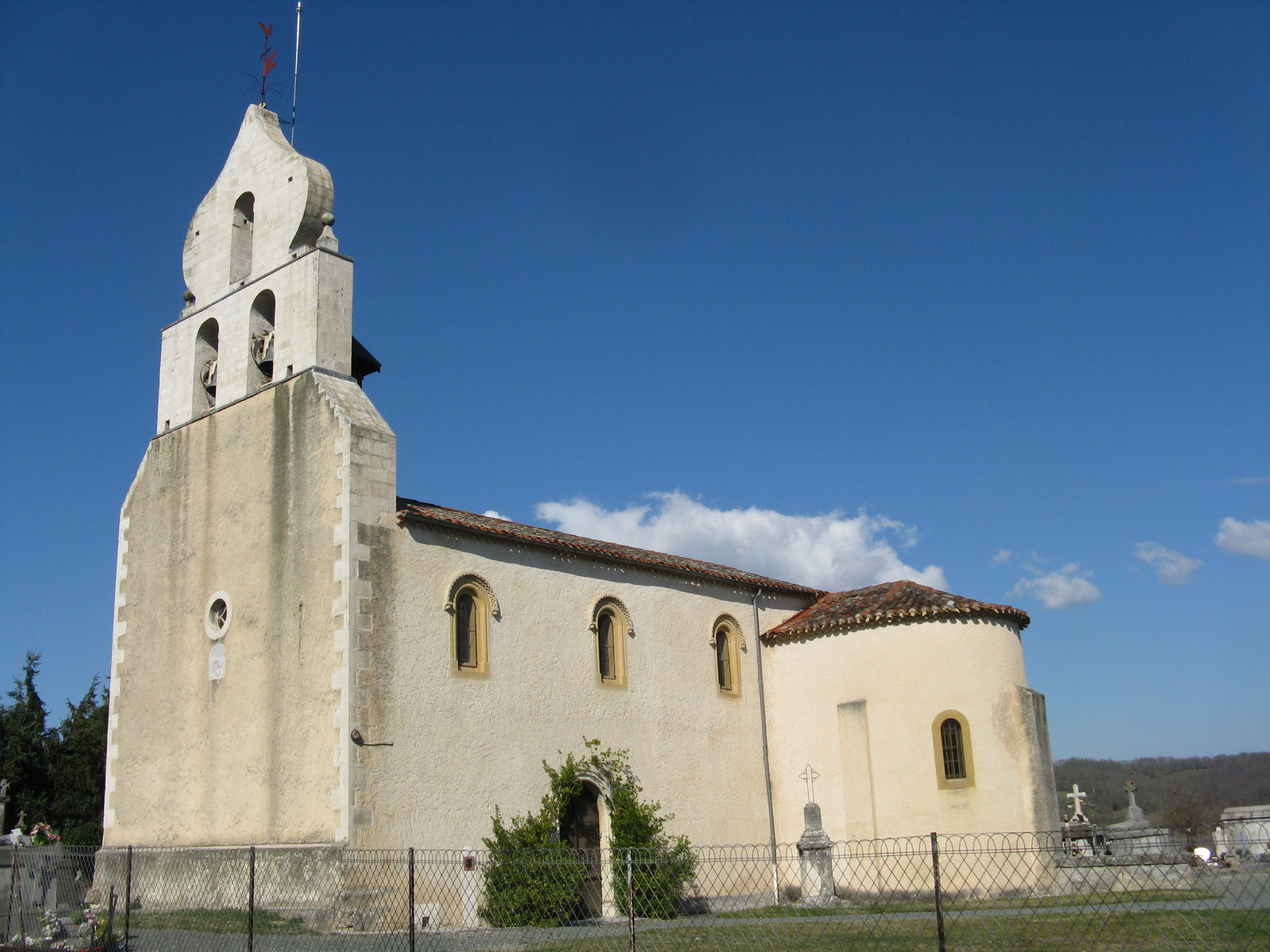
- The church in His
- Location of His
- Location within France Location within Occitanie
- Coordinates: 43°04′02″N 0°58′00″E
- Country: France
- Region: Occitania
- Department: Haute-Garonne
- Arrondissement: Saint-Gaudens
- Canton: Bagnères-de-Luchon
- Intercommunality: Cagire Garonne Salat

Government
  - Mayor (2020–2026): Eric Saint-Martin
- Area^{1}: 5.05 km^{2} (1.95 sq mi)
- Elevation: 323 m (1,060 ft)
- Highest elevation: 425 m (1,394 ft)
- Lowest elevation: 298 m (978 ft)
- Population (2023): 235
  - Density: 46.5/km^{2} (121/sq mi)
- Time zone: UTC+01:00 (CET)
  - Summer (DST): UTC+02:00 (CEST)
- INSEE/Postal code: 31237 /31260
- ^{1} French Land Register data, which excludes lakes, ponds, glaciers > 1 km^{2} (0.386 sq mi or 247 acres) and river estuaries.

His (Occitan: Hins) is a commune in the Haute-Garonne department in southwestern France.

== Population ==
Historical population
Year	Pop.	±% p.a.
1968	238	—
1975	203	−2.25%
1982	210	+0.49%
1990	192	−1.11%
1999	178	−0.84%
2007	212	+2.21%
2012	230	+1.64%
2017	223	−0.62%
2023	235	+0.88%
Source: INSEE

== See also ==
Communes of the Haute-Garonne department
