= Trébons-de-Luchon =

- Commune
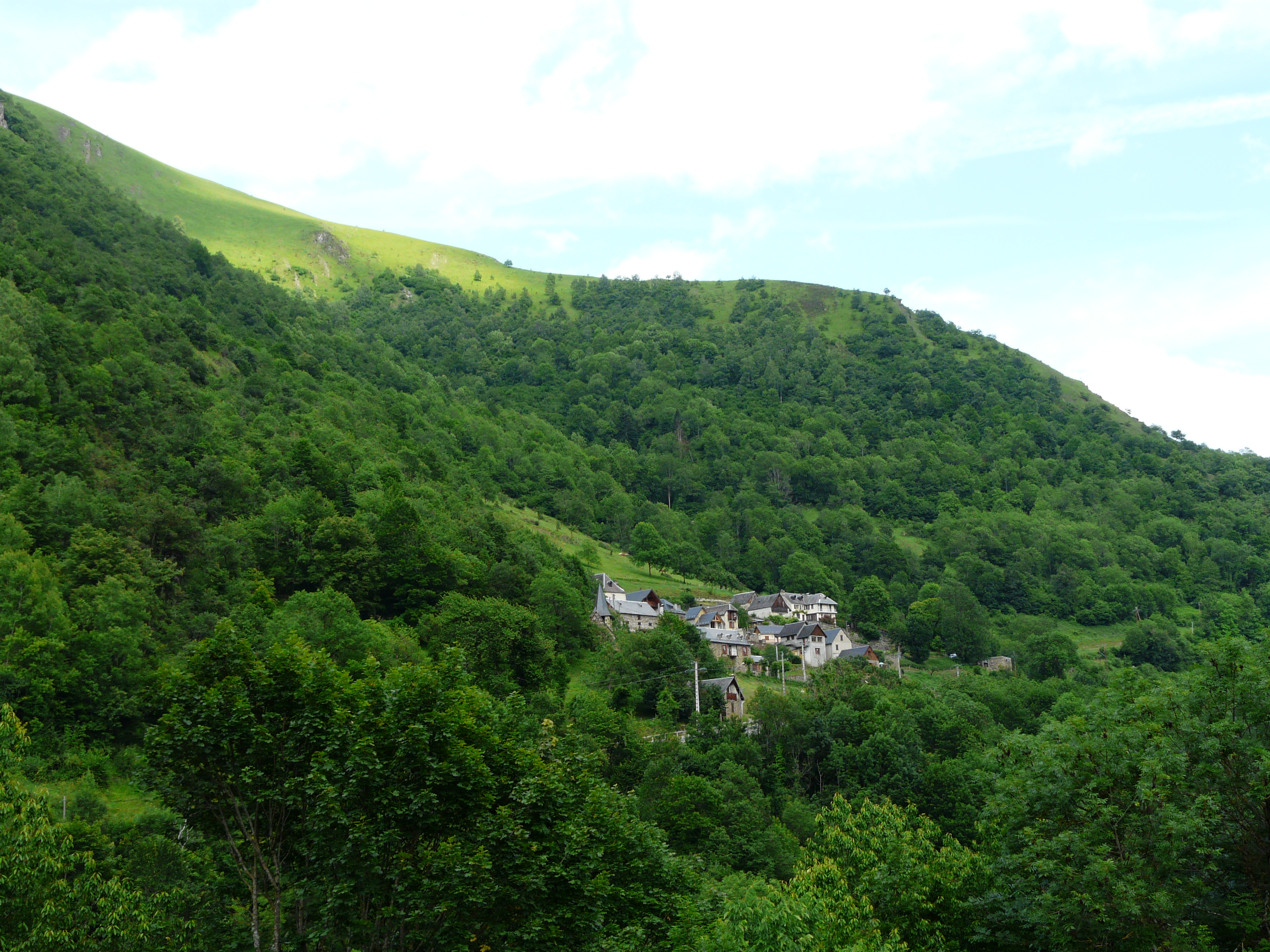
- A general view of Trébons-de-Luchon
- Location of Trébons-de-Luchon
- Location within France Location within Occitanie
- Coordinates: 42°48′18″N 0°34′00″E
- Country: France
- Region: Occitania
- Department: Haute-Garonne
- Arrondissement: Saint-Gaudens
- Canton: Bagnères-de-Luchon
- Intercommunality: Pyrénées Haut-Garonnaises

Government
  - Mayor (2020–2026): Guillaume Caussette
- Area^{1}: 0.8 km^{2} (0.31 sq mi)
- Elevation: 800 m (2,600 ft)
- Highest elevation: 1,447 m (4,747 ft)
- Lowest elevation: 720 m (2,360 ft)
- Population (2023): 8
  - Density: 10/km^{2} (26/sq mi)
- Time zone: UTC+01:00 (CET)
  - Summer (DST): UTC+02:00 (CEST)
- INSEE/Postal code: 31559 /31110
- ^{1} French Land Register data, which excludes lakes, ponds, glaciers > 1 km^{2} (0.386 sq mi or 247 acres) and river estuaries.

Trébons-de-Luchon is a commune in the Haute-Garonne department in southwestern France.

== Population ==
Historical population
Year	Pop.	±% p.a.
1968	13	—
1975	16	+3.01%
1982	13	−2.92%
1990	13	+0.00%
1999	10	−2.87%
2007	6	−6.19%
2012	7	+3.13%
2017	5	−6.51%
2023	8	+8.15%
Source: INSEE

== See also ==
- Communes of the Haute-Garonne department
