= Urau =

- Commune
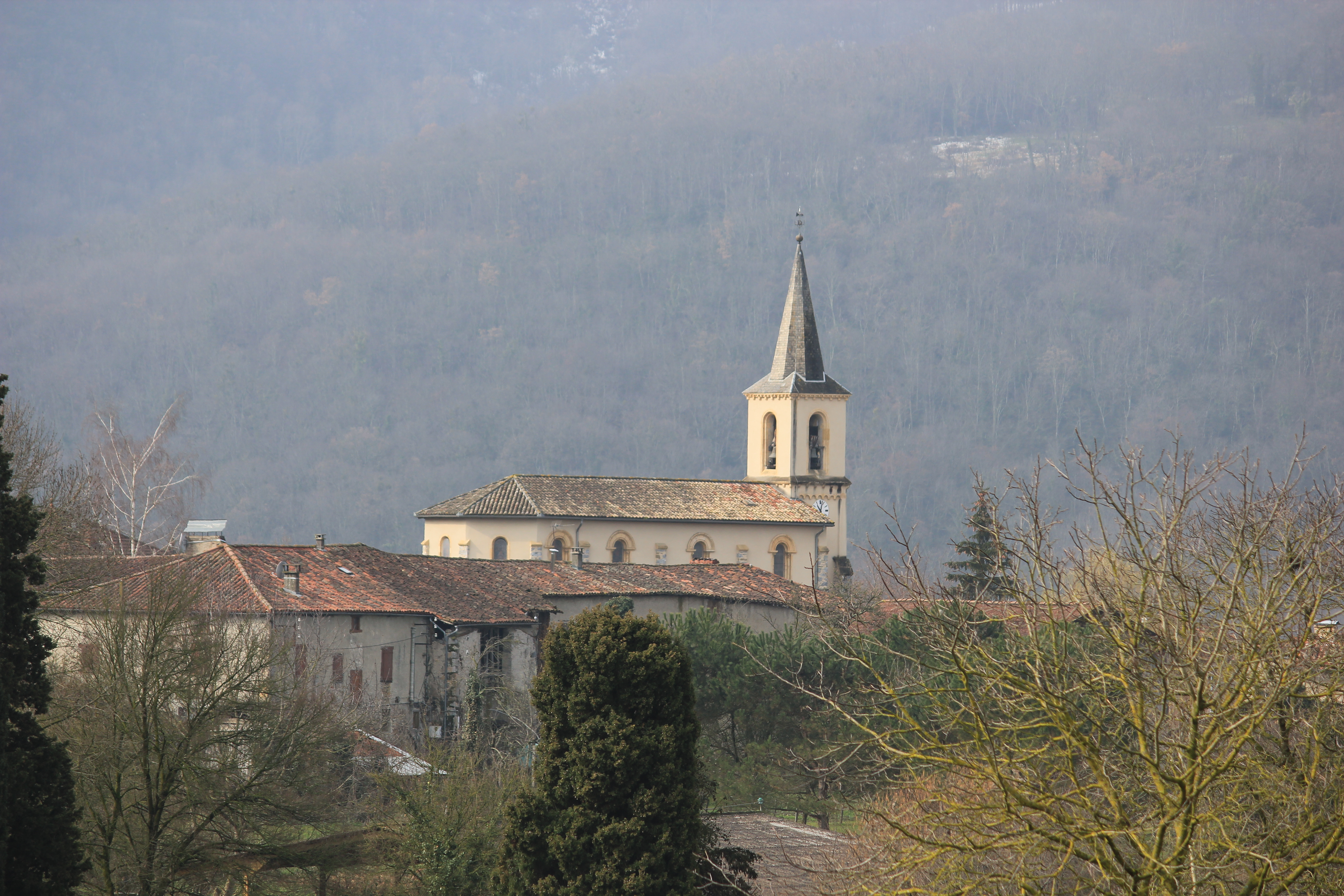
- The church in Urau
- Location of Urau
- Location within France Location within Occitanie
- Coordinates: 43°01′01″N 0°57′27″E
- Country: France
- Region: Occitania
- Department: Haute-Garonne
- Arrondissement: Saint-Gaudens
- Canton: Bagnères-de-Luchon

Government
  - Mayor (2024–2026): Véronique Buc
- Area^{1}: 18.45 km^{2} (7.12 sq mi)
- Elevation: 450 m (1,480 ft)
- Highest elevation: 1,260 m (4,130 ft)
- Lowest elevation: 359 m (1,178 ft)
- Population (2023): 118
  - Density: 6.40/km^{2} (16.6/sq mi)
- Time zone: UTC+01:00 (CET)
  - Summer (DST): UTC+02:00 (CEST)
- INSEE/Postal code: 31562 /31260
- ^{1} French Land Register data, which excludes lakes, ponds, glaciers > 1 km^{2} (0.386 sq mi or 247 acres) and river estuaries.

Urau (French pronunciation: [yʁo]) is a commune in the Haute-Garonne department in southwestern France.

== Population ==
Historical population
Year	Pop.	±% p.a.
1968	190	—
1975	163	−2.17%
1982	142	−1.95%
1990	146	+0.35%
1999	136	−0.79%
2007	140	+0.36%
2012	141	+0.14%
2017	123	−2.69%
2023	118	−0.69%
Source: INSEE

== See also ==
- Communes of the Haute-Garonne department
