= Pointis-de-Rivière =

- Commune
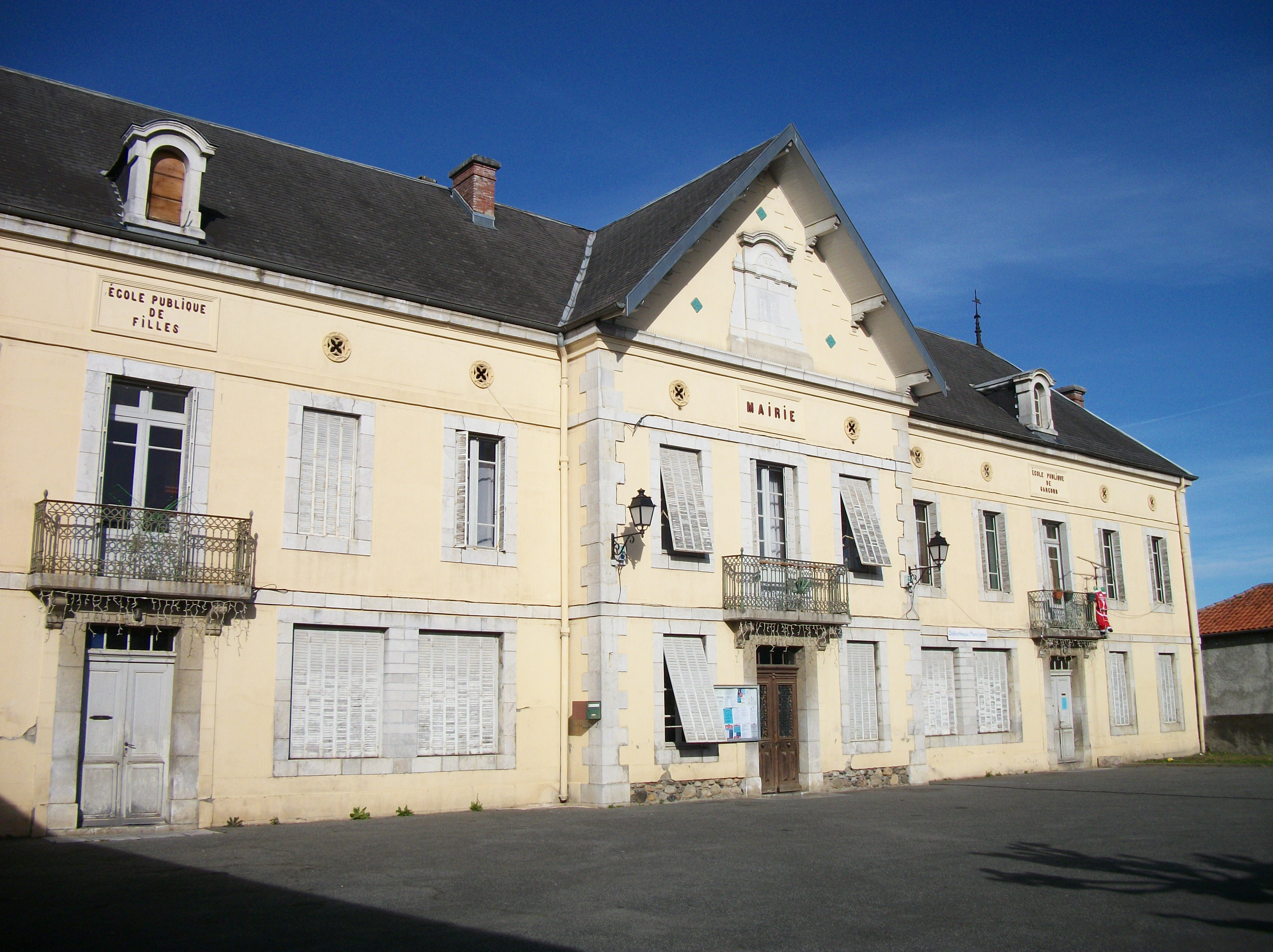
- The town hall in Pointis-de-Rivière

- Coat of arms
- Location of Pointis-de-Rivière
- Location within France Location within Occitanie
- Coordinates: 43°05′16″N 0°37′06″E
- Country: France
- Region: Occitania
- Department: Haute-Garonne
- Arrondissement: Saint-Gaudens
- Canton: Bagnères-de-Luchon

Government
  - Mayor (2020–2026): Patrick Bistolfi
- Area^{1}: 6.58 km^{2} (2.54 sq mi)
- Elevation: 409 m (1,342 ft)
- Highest elevation: 422 m (1,385 ft)
- Lowest elevation: 379 m (1,243 ft)
- Population (2023): 825
  - Density: 125/km^{2} (325/sq mi)
- Time zone: UTC+01:00 (CET)
  - Summer (DST): UTC+02:00 (CEST)
- INSEE/Postal code: 31426 /31210
- ^{1} French Land Register data, which excludes lakes, ponds, glaciers > 1 km^{2} (0.386 sq mi or 247 acres) and river estuaries.

Pointis-de-Rivière is a commune in the Haute-Garonne department in southwestern France.

== Population ==
Historical population
Year	Pop.	±% p.a.
1968	702	—
1975	691	−0.23%
1982	686	−0.10%
1990	740	+0.95%
1999	792	+0.76%
2007	843	+0.78%
2012	851	+0.19%
2017	840	−0.26%
2023	825	−0.30%
Source: INSEE

== See also ==
- Communes of the Haute-Garonne department
