= Benque-Dessous-et-Dessus =

- Commune
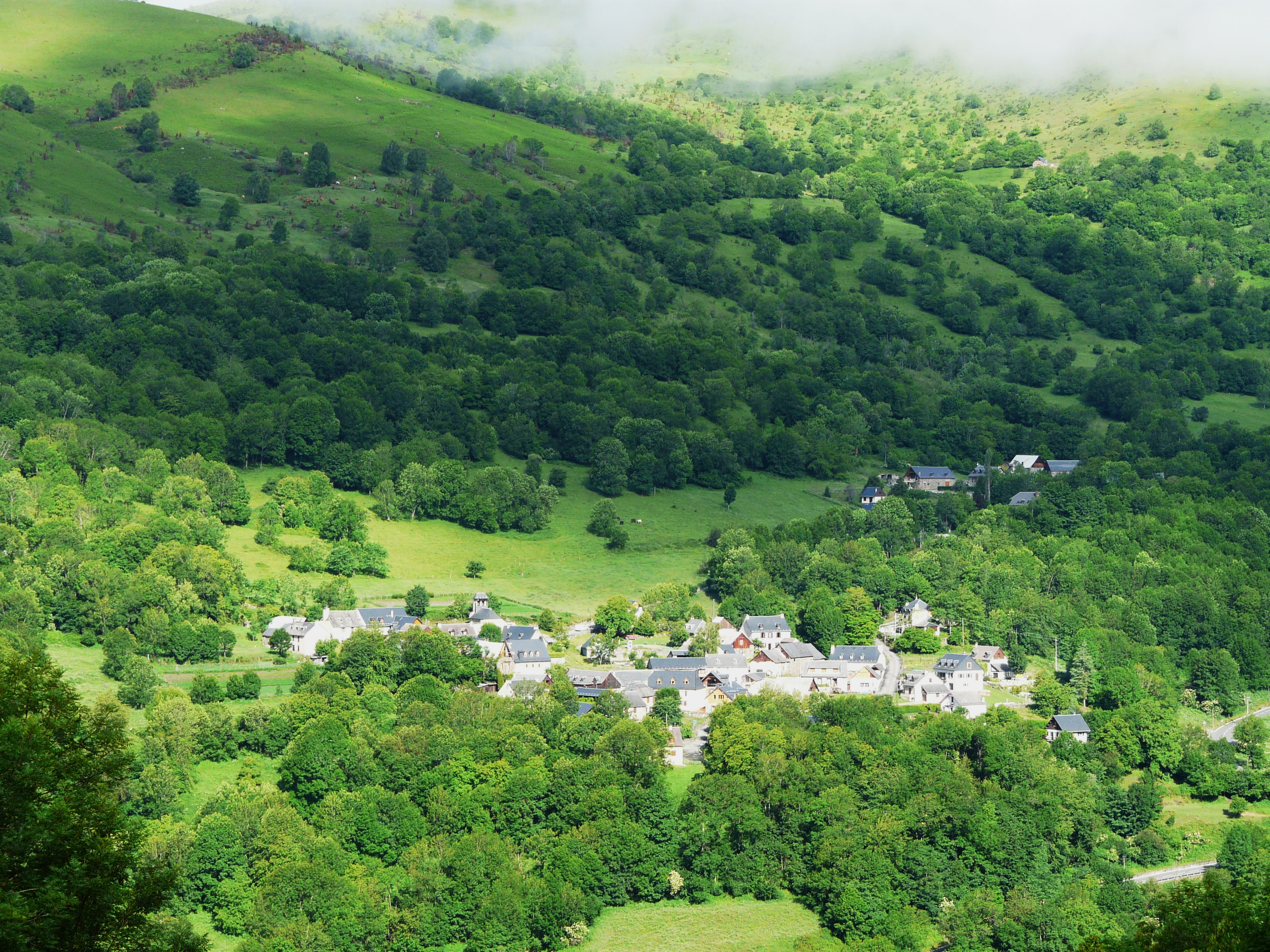
- An aerial view of Benque-Dessous-et-Dessus
- Location of Benque-Dessous-et-Dessus
- Location within France Location within Occitanie
- Coordinates: 42°48′58″N 0°33′20″E
- Country: France
- Region: Occitania
- Department: Haute-Garonne
- Arrondissement: Saint-Gaudens
- Canton: Bagnères-de-Luchon

Government
  - Mayor (2020–2026): Jean-Paul Dardé
- Area^{1}: 3.72 km^{2} (1.44 sq mi)
- Elevation: 1,084 m (3,556 ft)
- Highest elevation: 1,805 m (5,922 ft)
- Lowest elevation: 800 m (2,600 ft)
- Population (2023): 30
  - Density: 8.1/km^{2} (21/sq mi)
- Time zone: UTC+01:00 (CET)
  - Summer (DST): UTC+02:00 (CEST)
- INSEE/Postal code: 31064 /31110
- ^{1} French Land Register data, which excludes lakes, ponds, glaciers > 1 km^{2} (0.386 sq mi or 247 acres) and river estuaries.

Benque-Dessous-et-Dessus (French pronunciation: [bɛ̃k dəsu e dəsy]; Occitan: Benque Sota e Sòm) is a commune in the Haute-Garonne department in southwestern France.

== Population ==
Historical population
Year	Pop.	±% p.a.
1968	55	—
1975	33	−7.04%
1982	32	−0.44%
1990	33	+0.39%
1999	19	−5.95%
2007	16	−2.13%
2012	25	+9.34%
2017	25	+0.00%
2023	30	+3.09%
Source: INSEE

== See also ==
- Communes of the Haute-Garonne department
