= Bezins-Garraux =

- Commune
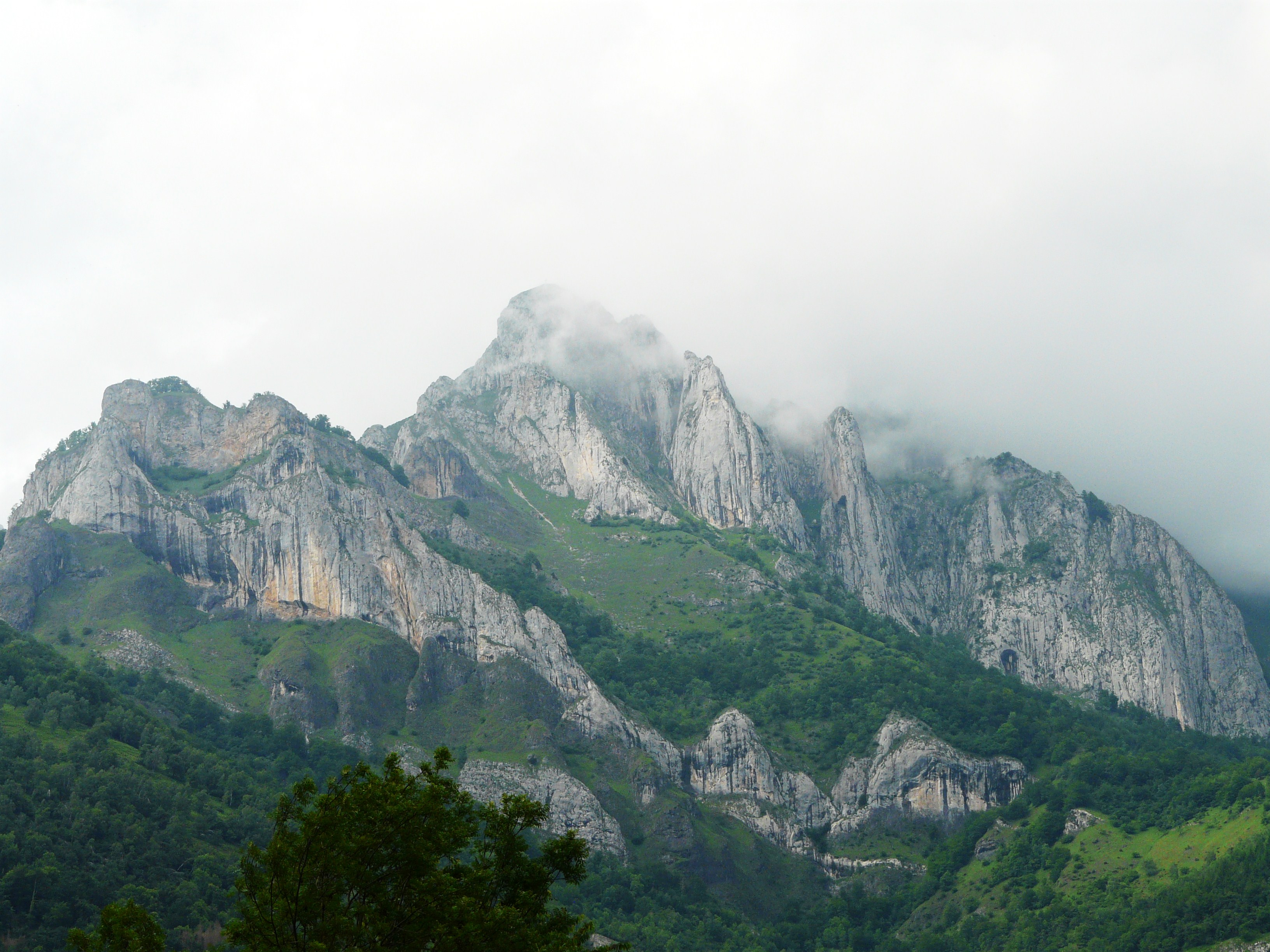
- Pic du Gar
- Location of Bezins-Garraux
- Location within France Location within Occitanie
- Coordinates: 42°55′56″N 0°41′30″E
- Country: France
- Region: Occitania
- Department: Haute-Garonne
- Arrondissement: Saint-Gaudens
- Canton: Bagnères-de-Luchon
- Intercommunality: Pyrénées Haut Garonnaises

Government
  - Mayor (2020–2026): Jean-Michel Dat
- Area^{1}: 7.71 km^{2} (2.98 sq mi)
- Elevation: 711 m (2,333 ft)
- Highest elevation: 1,788 m (5,866 ft)
- Lowest elevation: 568 m (1,864 ft)
- Population (2023): 46
  - Density: 6.0/km^{2} (15/sq mi)
- Time zone: UTC+01:00 (CET)
  - Summer (DST): UTC+02:00 (CEST)
- INSEE/Postal code: 31067 /31440
- ^{1} French Land Register data, which excludes lakes, ponds, glaciers > 1 km^{2} (0.386 sq mi or 247 acres) and river estuaries.

Bezins-Garraux is a commune in the Haute-Garonne department in southwestern France.

== Population ==
Historical population
Year	Pop.	±% p.a.
1968	47	—
1975	44	−0.94%
1982	38	−2.07%
1990	46	+2.42%
1999	39	−1.82%
2007	55	+4.39%
2012	42	−5.25%
2017	44	+0.93%
2023	46	+0.74%
Source: INSEE

== See also ==
- Communes of the Haute-Garonne department
