= Huos =

- Commune
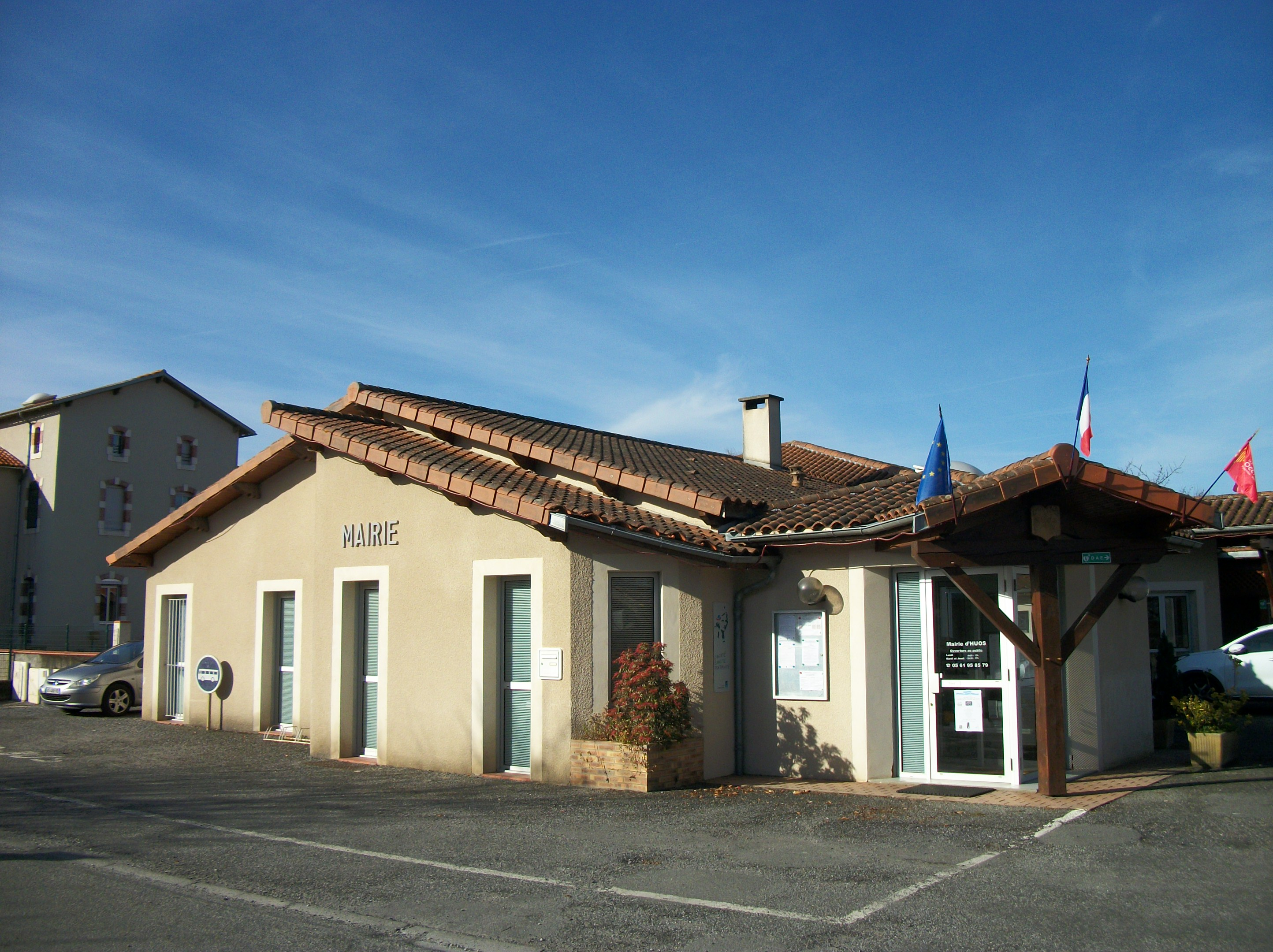
- The town hall in Huos

- Coat of arms
- Location of Huos
- Location within France Location within Occitanie
- Coordinates: 43°04′46″N 0°35′49″E
- Country: France
- Region: Occitania
- Department: Haute-Garonne
- Arrondissement: Saint-Gaudens
- Canton: Bagnères-de-Luchon

Government
  - Mayor (2020–2026): Claude Puigdellosas
- Area^{1}: 4.09 km^{2} (1.58 sq mi)
- Elevation: 435 m (1,427 ft)
- Highest elevation: 702 m (2,303 ft)
- Lowest elevation: 416 m (1,365 ft)
- Population (2023): 491
  - Density: 120/km^{2} (311/sq mi)
- Time zone: UTC+01:00 (CET)
  - Summer (DST): UTC+02:00 (CEST)
- INSEE/Postal code: 31238 /31210
- ^{1} French Land Register data, which excludes lakes, ponds, glaciers > 1 km^{2} (0.386 sq mi or 247 acres) and river estuaries.

Huos is a commune in the Haute-Garonne department in southwestern France.

== Population ==
Historical population
| Year | Pop. | ±% p.a. |
|---|---|---|
| 1968 | 418 | — |
| 1975 | 366 | −1.88% |
| 1982 | 368 | +0.08% |
| 1990 | 428 | +1.91% |
| 1999 | 450 | +0.56% |
| 2007 | 462 | +0.33% |
| 2012 | 467 | +0.22% |
| 2017 | 489 | +0.92% |
| 2023 | 491 | +0.07% |
Source: INSEE

== See also ==
Communes of the Haute-Garonne department
