= Auzas =

- Commune
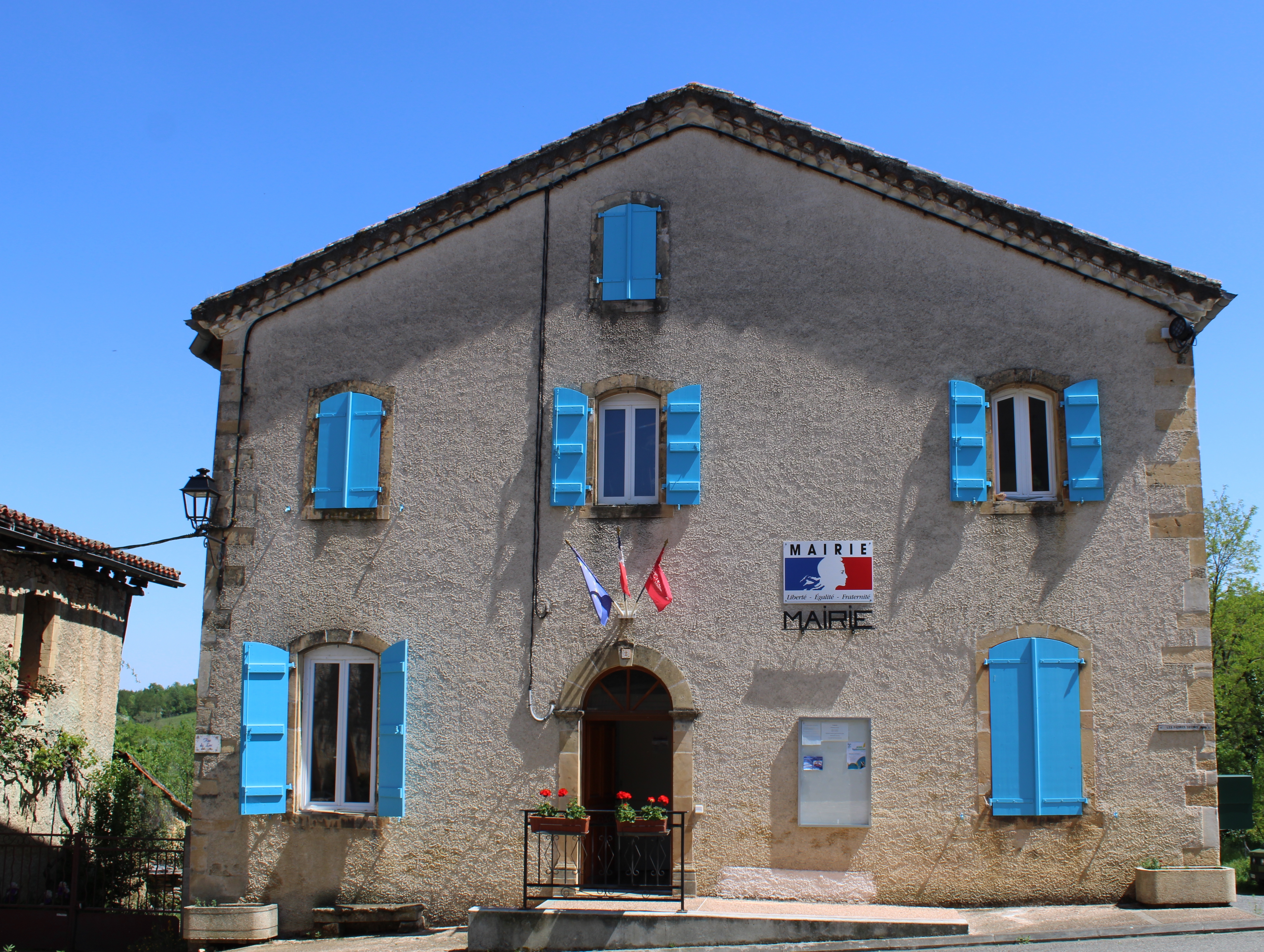
- Auzas Town hall

- Coat of arms
- Location of Auzas
- Location within France Location within Occitanie
- Coordinates: 43°10′13″N 0°53′03″E
- Country: France
- Region: Occitania
- Department: Haute-Garonne
- Arrondissement: Saint-Gaudens
- Canton: Bagnères-de-Luchon
- Intercommunality: CC Cagire Garonne Salat

Government
  - Mayor (2020–2026): Arlette Ballester
- Area^{1}: 7.89 km^{2} (3.05 sq mi)
- Elevation: 414 m (1,358 ft)
- Highest elevation: 474 m (1,555 ft)
- Lowest elevation: 288 m (945 ft)
- Population (2023): 222
  - Density: 28.1/km^{2} (72.9/sq mi)
- Time zone: UTC+01:00 (CET)
  - Summer (DST): UTC+02:00 (CEST)
- INSEE/Postal code: 31034 /31360
- ^{1} French Land Register data, which excludes lakes, ponds, glaciers > 1 km^{2} (0.386 sq mi or 247 acres) and river estuaries.

Auzas (French pronunciation: [ozas]; Occitan: Ausàs) is a commune in the Haute-Garonne department in southwestern France.

== Population ==
Historical population
Year	Pop.	±% p.a.
1968	179	—
1975	175	−0.32%
1982	163	−1.01%
1990	142	−1.71%
1999	132	−0.81%
2007	170	+3.21%
2012	199	+3.20%
2017	239	+3.73%
2023	222	−1.22%
Source: INSEE

== See also ==
- Communes of the Haute-Garonne department
