= Saint-Médard, Haute-Garonne =

Saint-Médard
- Commune
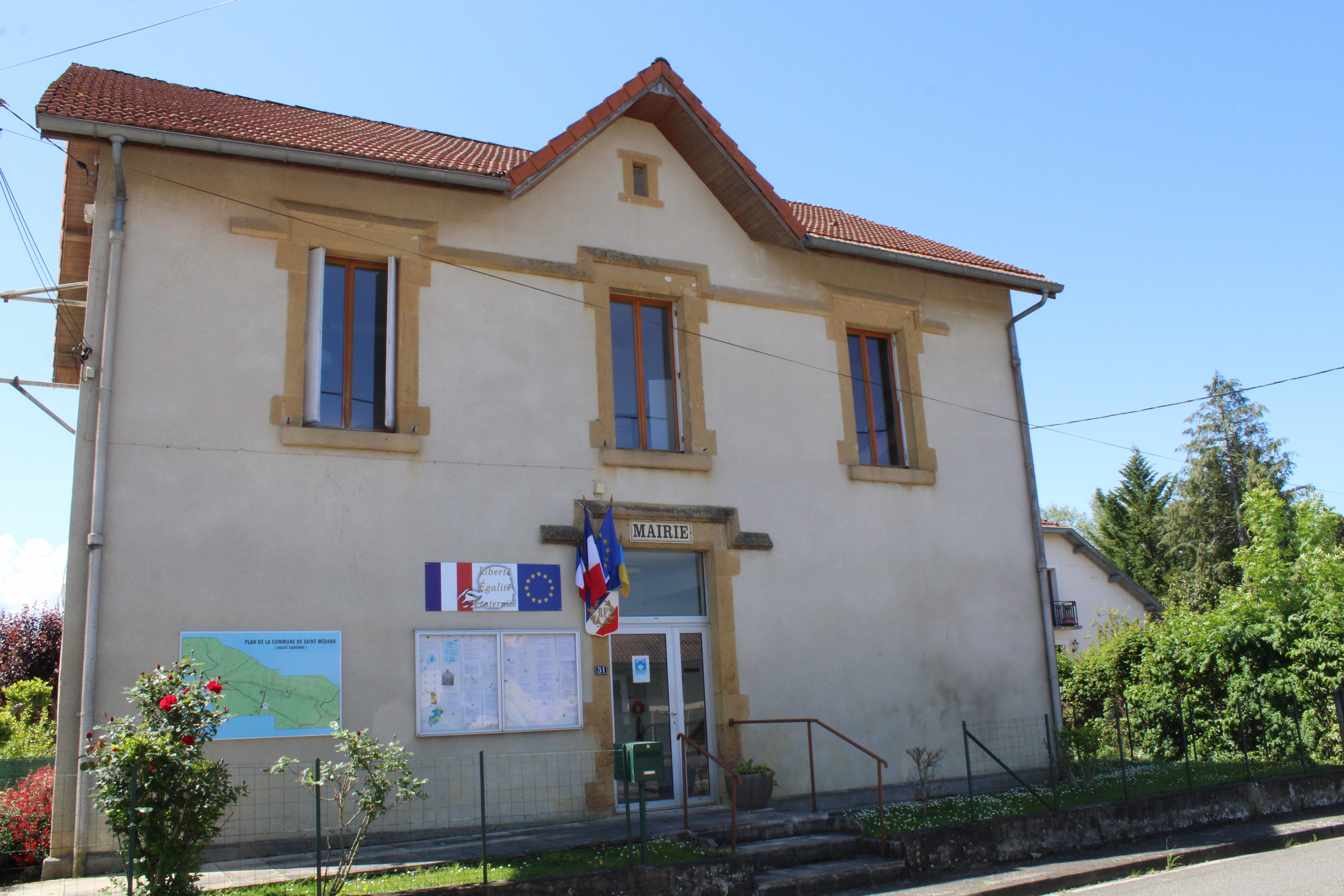
- Saint-Médard Town hall
- Location of Saint-Médard
- Location within France Location within Occitanie
- Coordinates: 43°07′45″N 0°50′08″E
- Country: France
- Region: Occitania
- Department: Haute-Garonne
- Arrondissement: Saint-Gaudens
- Canton: Bagnères-de-Luchon

Government
  - Mayor (2024–2026): Jean-Pierre Barutaut
- Area^{1}: 5.32 km^{2} (2.05 sq mi)
- Elevation: 400 m (1,300 ft)
- Highest elevation: 441 m (1,447 ft)
- Lowest elevation: 322 m (1,056 ft)
- Population (2023): 225
  - Density: 42.3/km^{2} (110/sq mi)
- Time zone: UTC+01:00 (CET)
  - Summer (DST): UTC+02:00 (CEST)
- INSEE/Postal code: 31504 /31360
- ^{1} French Land Register data, which excludes lakes, ponds, glaciers > 1 km^{2} (0.386 sq mi or 247 acres) and river estuaries.

Saint-Médard (French pronunciation: [sɛ̃ medaʁ]; Gascon: Sent Mesard) is commune in the Haute-Garonne department in southwestern France.

== Population ==
Historical population
Year	Pop.	±% p.a.
1968	148	—
1975	154	+0.57%
1982	185	+2.65%
1990	232	+2.87%
1999	235	+0.14%
2007	201	−1.93%
2012	213	+1.17%
2017	221	+0.74%
2023	225	+0.30%
Source: INSEE

== See also ==
- Communes of the Haute-Garonne department
