= Montgaillard-de-Salies =

- Commune
- Location of Montgaillard-de-Salies
- Location within France Location within Occitanie
- Coordinates: 43°03′44″N 0°55′56″E
- Country: France
- Region: Occitania
- Department: Haute-Garonne
- Arrondissement: Saint-Gaudens
- Canton: Bagnères-de-Luchon
- Intercommunality: Cagire Garonne Salat

Government
  - Mayor (2020–2026): Sylvie Duchein
- Area^{1}: 6.04 km^{2} (2.33 sq mi)
- Elevation: 315 m (1,033 ft)
- Highest elevation: 424 m (1,391 ft)
- Lowest elevation: 307 m (1,007 ft)
- Population (2023): 108
  - Density: 17.9/km^{2} (46.3/sq mi)
- Time zone: UTC+01:00 (CET)
  - Summer (DST): UTC+02:00 (CEST)
- INSEE/Postal code: 31376 /31260
- ^{1} French Land Register data, which excludes lakes, ponds, glaciers > 1 km^{2} (0.386 sq mi or 247 acres) and river estuaries.

Montgaillard-de-Salies (French pronunciation: [mɔ̃gajaʁ də sali]; Occitan: Montgalhard de Saliás) is a commune in the Haute-Garonne department of southwestern France.

== Population ==
Historical population
Year	Pop.	±% p.a.
1968	162	—
1975	135	−2.57%
1982	134	−0.11%
1990	118	−1.58%
1999	105	−1.29%
2007	102	−0.36%
2012	100	−0.40%
2017	103	+0.59%
2023	108	+0.79%
Source: INSEE

== See also ==
- Communes of the Haute-Garonne department
