= Jurvielle =

- Commune
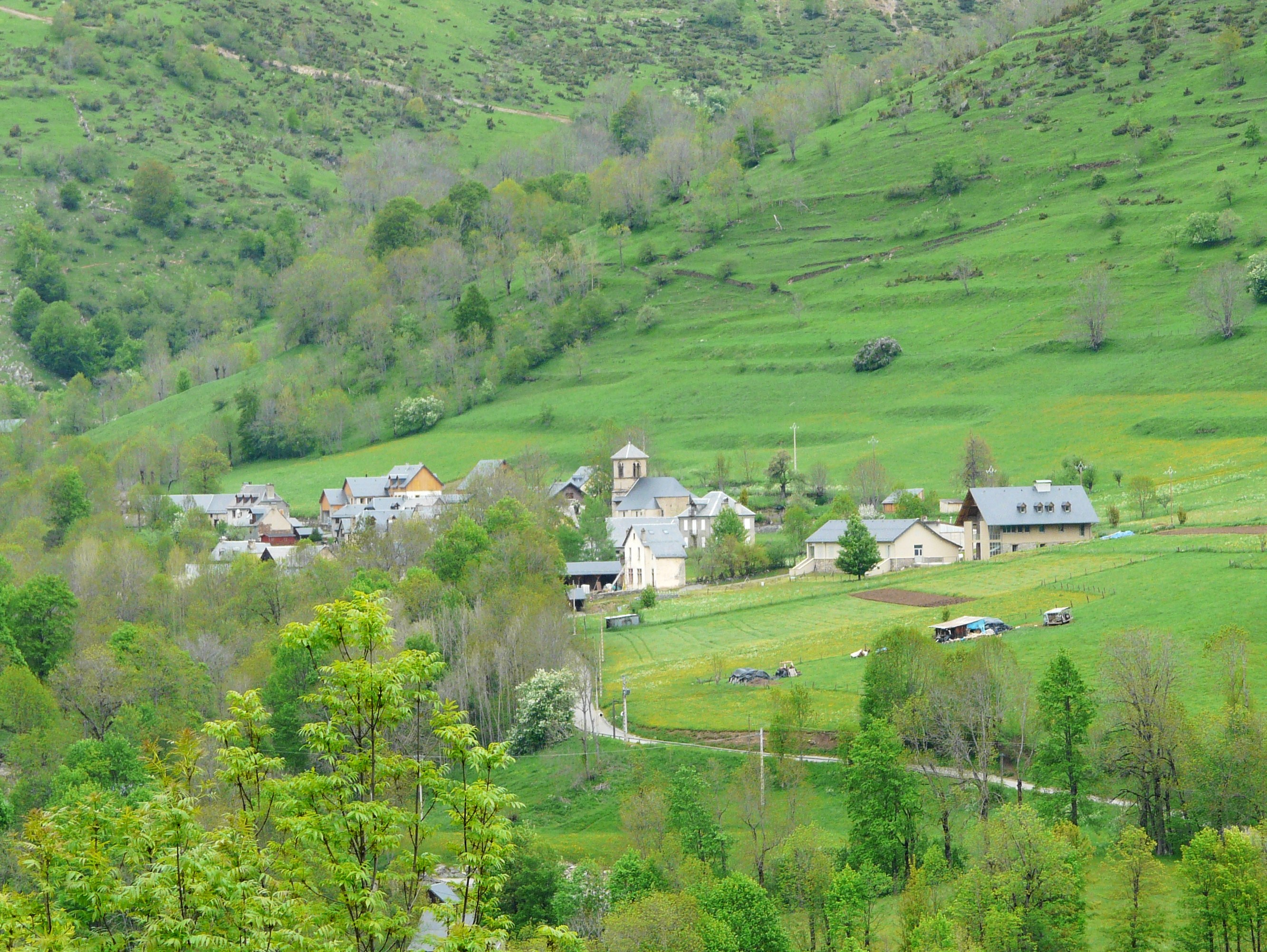
- A general view of Jurvielle
- Location of Jurvielle
- Location within France Location within Occitanie
- Coordinates: 42°49′06″N 0°29′14″E
- Country: France
- Region: Occitania
- Department: Haute-Garonne
- Arrondissement: Saint-Gaudens
- Canton: Bagnères-de-Luchon

Government
  - Mayor (2020–2026): Patrick Elie
- Area^{1}: 5.79 km^{2} (2.24 sq mi)
- Elevation: 1,250 m (4,100 ft)
- Highest elevation: 2,093 m (6,867 ft)
- Lowest elevation: 1,240 m (4,070 ft)
- Population (2023): 23
  - Density: 4.0/km^{2} (10/sq mi)
- Time zone: UTC+01:00 (CET)
  - Summer (DST): UTC+02:00 (CEST)
- INSEE/Postal code: 31242 /31110
- ^{1} French Land Register data, which excludes lakes, ponds, glaciers > 1 km^{2} (0.386 sq mi or 247 acres) and river estuaries.

Jurvielle (French pronunciation: [ʒyʁvjɛl]; Occitan: Jurvièla) is a commune in the Haute-Garonne department in southwestern France.

== Population ==
Historical population
Year	Pop.	±% p.a.
1968	49	—
1975	31	−6.33%
1982	19	−6.75%
1990	18	−0.67%
1999	15	−2.01%
2007	20	+3.66%
2012	22	+1.92%
2017	20	−1.89%
2023	23	+2.36%
Source: INSEE

== See also ==
Communes of the Haute-Garonne department
