= Esténos =

- Commune
- Location of Esténos
- Location within France Location within Occitanie
- Coordinates: 42°56′53″N 0°38′29″E
- Country: France
- Region: Occitania
- Department: Haute-Garonne
- Arrondissement: Saint-Gaudens
- Canton: Bagnères-de-Luchon
- Intercommunality: Pyrénées Haut Garonnaises

Government
  - Mayor (2020–2026): Denis Martin
- Area^{1}: 3.41 km^{2} (1.32 sq mi)
- Highest elevation: 1,467 m (4,813 ft)
- Lowest elevation: 466 m (1,529 ft)
- Population (2023): 191
  - Density: 56.0/km^{2} (145/sq mi)
- Time zone: UTC+01:00 (CET)
  - Summer (DST): UTC+02:00 (CEST)
- INSEE/Postal code: 31176 /31440
- ^{1} French Land Register data, which excludes lakes, ponds, glaciers > 1 km^{2} (0.386 sq mi or 247 acres) and river estuaries.

Esténos (Gascon: Estenòs) is a commune in the Haute-Garonne department in southwestern France.

== Population ==
Historical population
Year	Pop.	±% p.a.
1968	225	—
1975	228	+0.19%
1982	193	−2.35%
1990	175	−1.22%
1999	167	−0.52%
2007	181	+1.01%
2012	184	+0.33%
2017	187	+0.32%
2023	191	+0.35%
Source: INSEE

== See also ==
- Communes of the Haute-Garonne department
