= Frontignan-de-Comminges =

- Commune
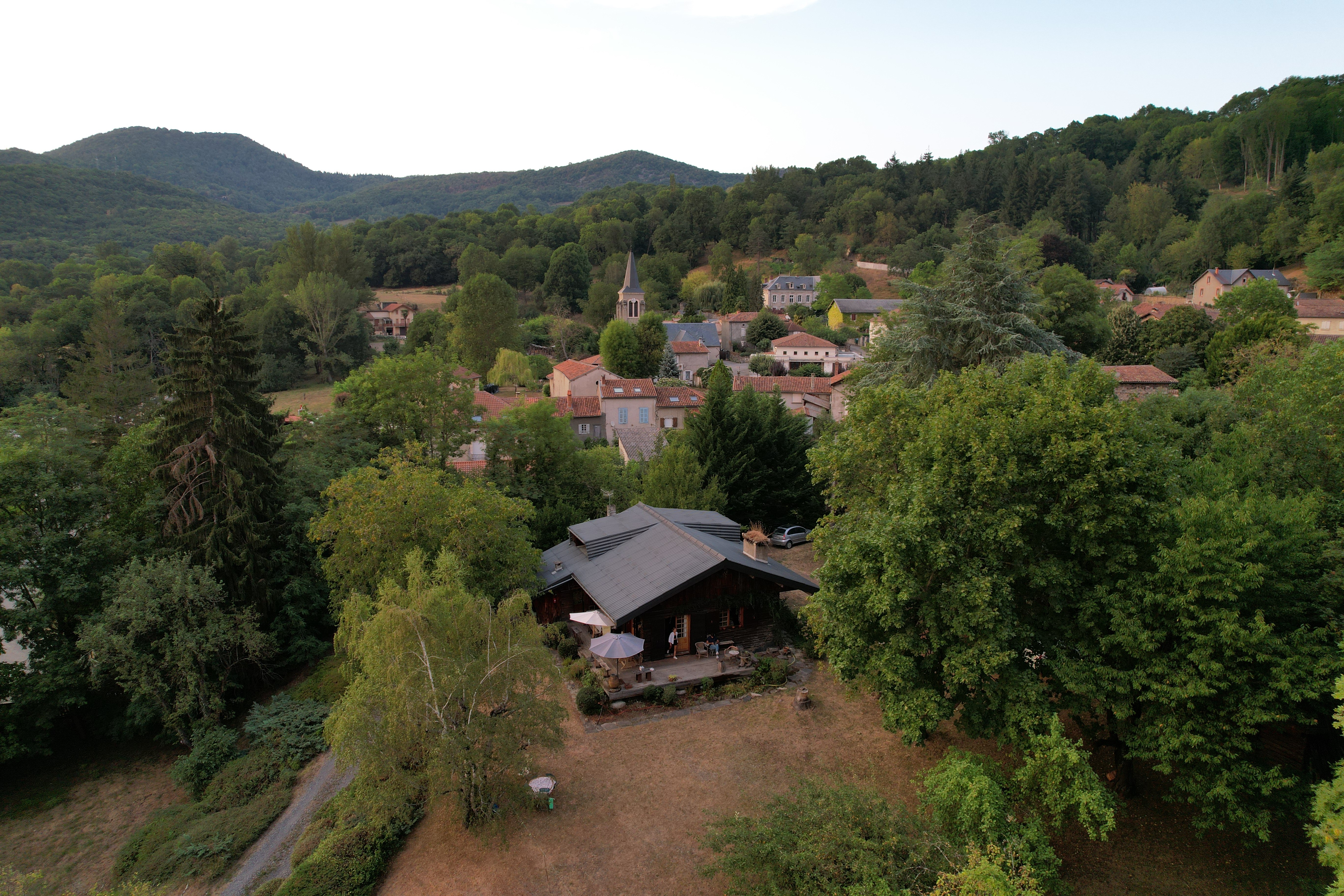
- A general view of Frontignan-de-Comminges
- Location of Frontignan-de-Comminges
- Location within France Location within Occitanie
- Coordinates: 42°58′19″N 0°39′34″E
- Country: France
- Region: Occitania
- Department: Haute-Garonne
- Arrondissement: Saint-Gaudens
- Canton: Bagnères-de-Luchon

Government
  - Mayor (2020–2026): Yves Planas
- Area^{1}: 2.53 km^{2} (0.98 sq mi)
- Elevation: 485 m (1,591 ft)
- Highest elevation: 1,565 m (5,135 ft)
- Lowest elevation: 468 m (1,535 ft)
- Population (2023): 80
  - Density: 32/km^{2} (82/sq mi)
- Time zone: UTC+01:00 (CET)
  - Summer (DST): UTC+02:00 (CEST)
- INSEE/Postal code: 31200 /31510
- ^{1} French Land Register data, which excludes lakes, ponds, glaciers > 1 km^{2} (0.386 sq mi or 247 acres) and river estuaries.

Frontignan-de-Comminges is a commune in the Haute-Garonne department in southwestern France.

== Population ==
Historical population
Year	Pop.	±% p.a.
1968	78	—
1975	73	−0.94%
1982	69	−0.80%
1990	63	−1.13%
1999	73	+1.65%
2007	67	−1.07%
2012	70	+0.88%
2017	77	+1.92%
2023	80	+0.64%
Source: INSEE

== See also ==
- Communes of the Haute-Garonne department
