= Mane, Haute-Garonne =

Mane
- Commune
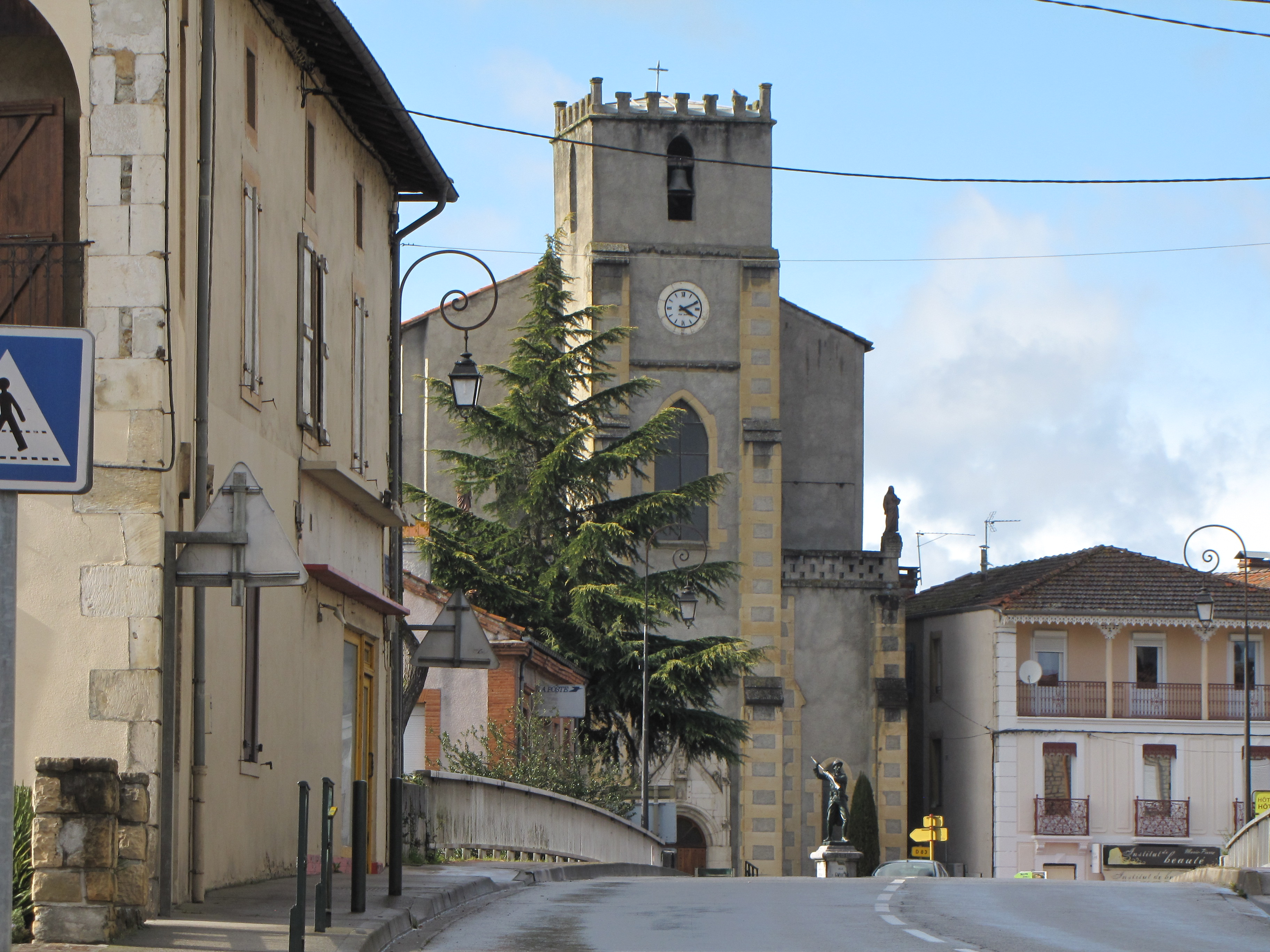
- The church in Mane
- Location of Mane
- Location within France Location within Occitanie
- Coordinates: 43°04′58″N 0°57′08″E
- Country: France
- Region: Occitania
- Department: Haute-Garonne
- Arrondissement: Saint-Gaudens
- Canton: Bagnères-de-Luchon
- Intercommunality: Cagire Garonne Salat

Government
  - Mayor (2020–2026): Michel Masquère
- Area^{1}: 6.59 km^{2} (2.54 sq mi)
- Elevation: 307 m (1,007 ft)
- Highest elevation: 414 m (1,358 ft)
- Lowest elevation: 294 m (965 ft)
- Population (2023): 969
  - Density: 147/km^{2} (381/sq mi)
- Time zone: UTC+01:00 (CET)
  - Summer (DST): UTC+02:00 (CEST)
- INSEE/Postal code: 31315 /31260
- ^{1} French Land Register data, which excludes lakes, ponds, glaciers > 1 km^{2} (0.386 sq mi or 247 acres) and river estuaries.

Mane (French pronunciation: [man]; Occitan: Mana) is a commune in the Haute-Garonne department in southwestern France.

== Population ==
Historical population
Year	Pop.	±% p.a.
1968	905	—
1975	1,019	+1.71%
1982	1,093	+1.01%
1990	1,054	−0.45%
1999	1,026	−0.30%
2007	972	−0.67%
2012	995	+0.47%
2017	963	−0.65%
2023	969	+0.10%
Source: INSEE

== See also ==
- Communes of the Haute-Garonne department
