= Sepx =

- Commune
- Location of Sepx
- Location within France Location within Occitanie
- Coordinates: 43°09′20″N 0°50′28″E
- Country: France
- Region: Occitania
- Department: Haute-Garonne
- Arrondissement: Saint-Gaudens
- Canton: Bagnères-de-Luchon
- Intercommunality: Cagire Garonne Salat

Government
  - Mayor (2020–2026): Marlène Saint-Blancat
- Area^{1}: 12.37 km^{2} (4.78 sq mi)
- Elevation: 390 m (1,280 ft)
- Highest elevation: 489 m (1,604 ft)
- Lowest elevation: 360 m (1,180 ft)
- Population (2023): 211
  - Density: 17.1/km^{2} (44.2/sq mi)
- Time zone: UTC+01:00 (CET)
  - Summer (DST): UTC+02:00 (CEST)
- INSEE/Postal code: 31545 /31360
- ^{1} French Land Register data, which excludes lakes, ponds, glaciers > 1 km^{2} (0.386 sq mi or 247 acres) and river estuaries.

Sepx is a commune in the Haute-Garonne department in southwestern France.

== Population ==
Historical population
Year	Pop.	±% p.a.
1968	217	—
1975	186	−2.18%
1982	186	+0.00%
1990	157	−2.10%
1999	153	−0.29%
2007	165	+0.95%
2012	214	+5.34%
2017	224	+0.92%
2023	211	−0.99%
Source: INSEE

== See also ==
- Communes of the Haute-Garonne department
