= Touille =

- Commune
- Location of Touille
- Location within France Location within Occitanie
- Coordinates: 43°04′52″N 0°58′28″E
- Country: France
- Region: Occitania
- Department: Haute-Garonne
- Arrondissement: Saint-Gaudens
- Canton: Bagnères-de-Luchon

Government
  - Mayor (2020–2026): Michel Estrella
- Area^{1}: 6.49 km^{2} (2.51 sq mi)
- Elevation: 340 m (1,120 ft)
- Highest elevation: 443 m (1,453 ft)
- Lowest elevation: 293 m (961 ft)
- Population (2023): 245
  - Density: 37.8/km^{2} (97.8/sq mi)
- Time zone: UTC+01:00 (CET)
  - Summer (DST): UTC+02:00 (CEST)
- INSEE/Postal code: 31554 /31260
- ^{1} French Land Register data, which excludes lakes, ponds, glaciers > 1 km^{2} (0.386 sq mi or 247 acres) and river estuaries.

Touille (French pronunciation: [tuj]; Occitan: Tolha) is a commune in the Haute-Garonne department in southwestern France.

== Population ==
Historical population
Year	Pop.	±% p.a.
1968	293	—
1975	234	−3.16%
1982	213	−1.33%
1990	204	−0.54%
1999	204	+0.00%
2007	262	+3.18%
2012	252	−0.78%
2017	246	−0.48%
2023	245	−0.07%
Source: INSEE

== See also ==
- Communes of the Haute-Garonne department
