= Mont-de-Galié =

- Commune
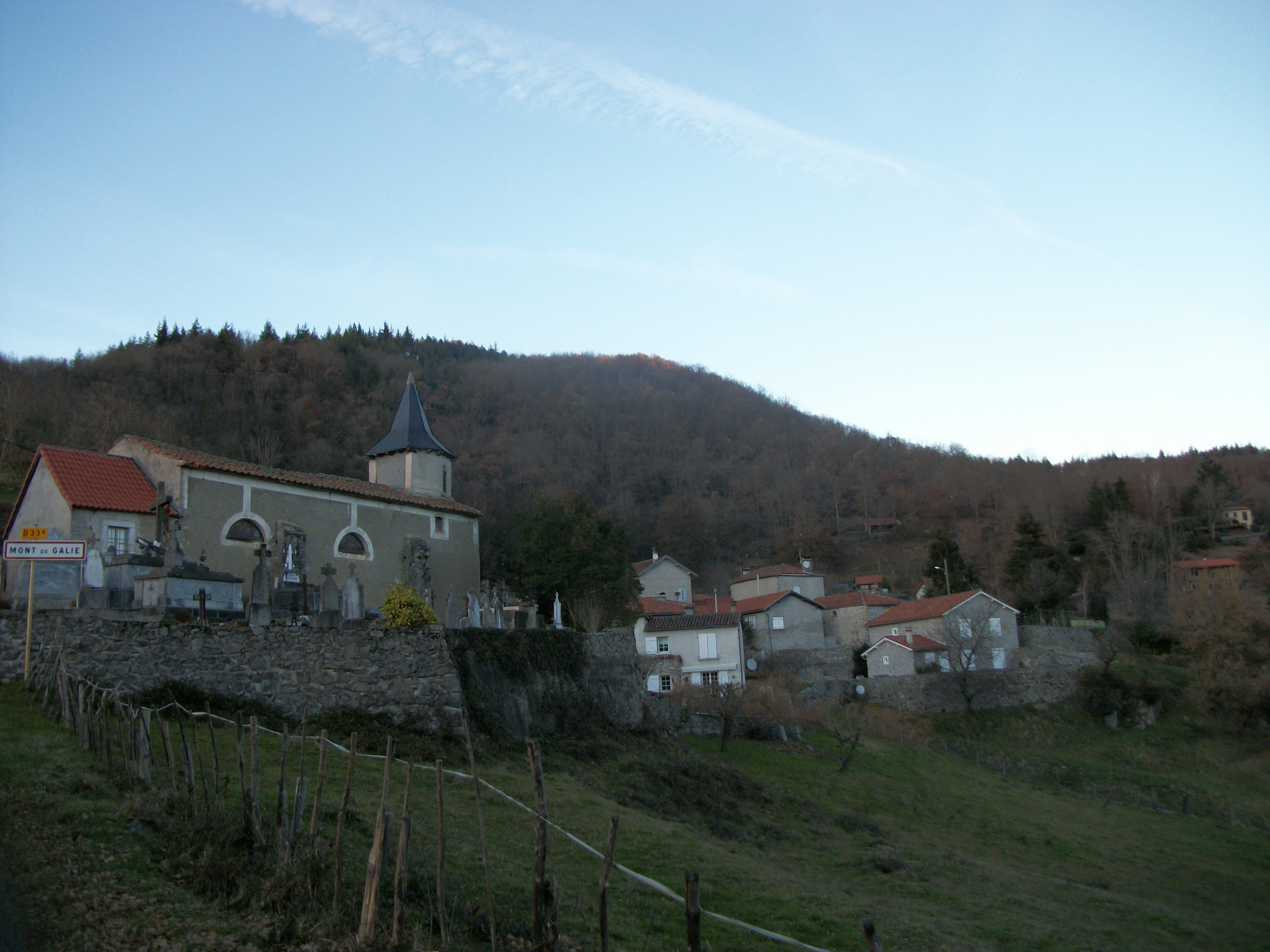
- The church and surroundings in Mont-de-Galié
- Location of Mont-de-Galié
- Location within France Location within Occitanie
- Coordinates: 42°59′25″N 0°38′52″E
- Country: France
- Region: Occitania
- Department: Haute-Garonne
- Arrondissement: Saint-Gaudens
- Canton: Bagnères-de-Luchon

Government
  - Mayor (2020–2026): Henri Thébé
- Area^{1}: 2.42 km^{2} (0.93 sq mi)
- Elevation: 775 m (2,543 ft)
- Highest elevation: 1,006 m (3,301 ft)
- Lowest elevation: 560 m (1,840 ft)
- Population (2023): 24
  - Density: 9.9/km^{2} (26/sq mi)
- Time zone: UTC+01:00 (CET)
  - Summer (DST): UTC+02:00 (CEST)
- INSEE/Postal code: 31369 /31510
- ^{1} French Land Register data, which excludes lakes, ponds, glaciers > 1 km^{2} (0.386 sq mi or 247 acres) and river estuaries.

Mont-de-Galié (French pronunciation: [mɔ̃ də ɡalje]; Occitan: Mont de Galièr) is a commune in the Haute-Garonne department in southwestern France.

== Population ==
Historical population
Year	Pop.	±% p.a.
1968	37	—
1975	30	−2.95%
1982	42	+4.92%
1990	39	−0.92%
1999	36	−0.89%
2007	39	+1.01%
2012	35	−2.14%
2017	42	+3.71%
2023	24	−8.91%
Source: INSEE

== See also ==
- Communes of the Haute-Garonne department
