= Razecueillé =

- Commune
- Location of Razecueillé
- Location within France Location within Occitanie
- Coordinates: 42°58′09″N 0°47′55″E
- Country: France
- Region: Occitania
- Department: Haute-Garonne
- Arrondissement: Saint-Gaudens
- Canton: Bagnères-de-Luchon

Government
  - Mayor (2020–2026): Jean-Pierre Barrere
- Area^{1}: 6.50 km^{2} (2.51 sq mi)
- Elevation: 765 m (2,510 ft)
- Highest elevation: 1,538 m (5,046 ft)
- Lowest elevation: 516 m (1,693 ft)
- Population (2023): 29
  - Density: 4.5/km^{2} (12/sq mi)
- Time zone: UTC+01:00 (CET)
  - Summer (DST): UTC+02:00 (CEST)
- INSEE/Postal code: 31447 /31160
- ^{1} French Land Register data, which excludes lakes, ponds, glaciers > 1 km^{2} (0.386 sq mi or 247 acres) and river estuaries.

Razecueillé (French pronunciation: [ʁazkœje]; Occitan: Reculhèr) is a commune in the Haute-Garonne department in southwestern France.

== Population ==
Historical population
| Year | Pop. | ±% p.a. |
|---|---|---|
| 1968 | 69 | — |
| 1975 | 66 | −0.63% |
| 1982 | 64 | −0.44% |
| 1990 | 36 | −6.94% |
| 1999 | 37 | +0.30% |
| 2007 | 32 | −1.80% |
| 2012 | 40 | +4.56% |
| 2017 | 37 | −1.55% |
| 2023 | 29 | −3.98% |
Source: INSEE

== See also ==
- Communes of the Haute-Garonne department
