= Mayrègne =

- Commune
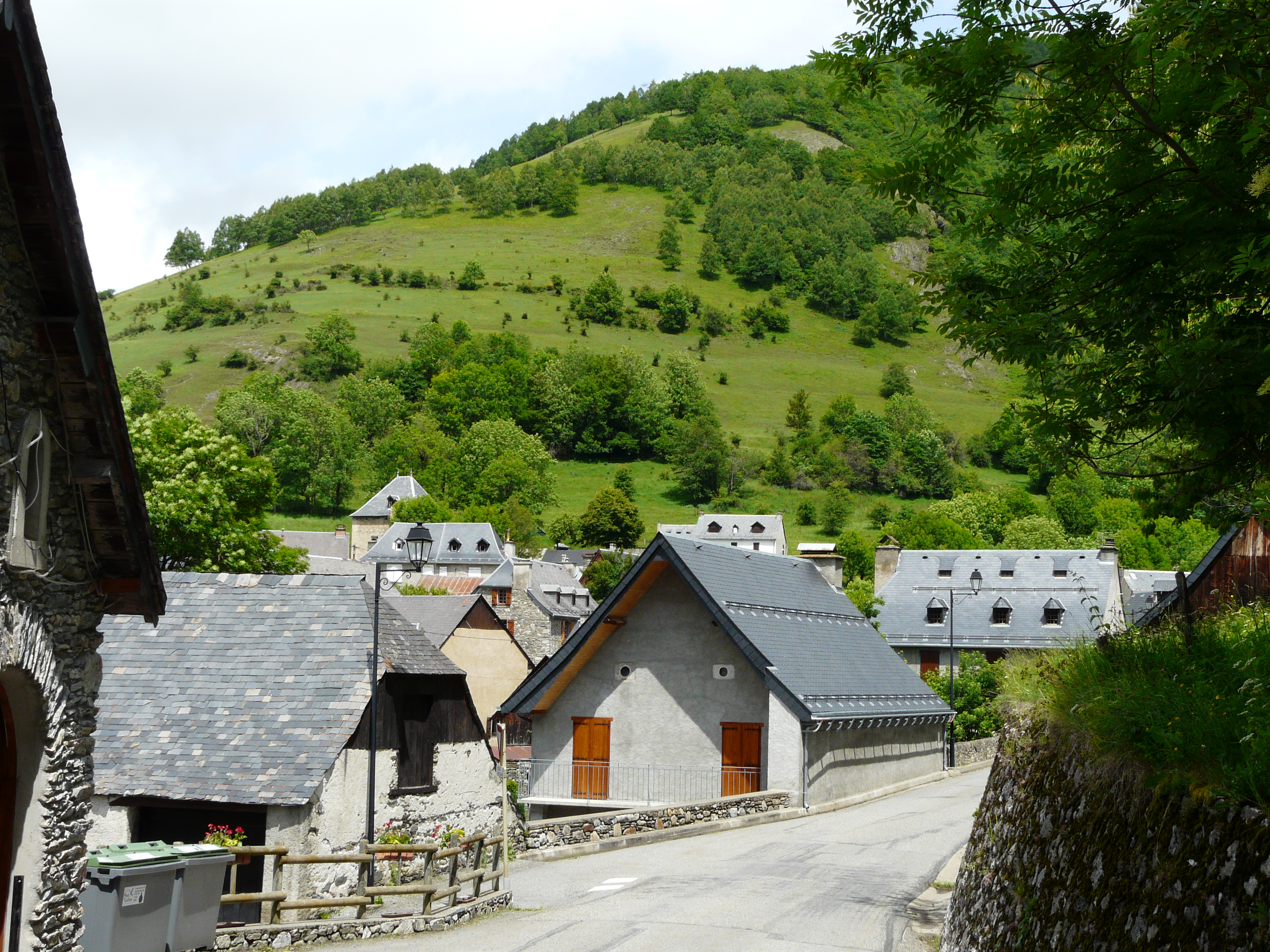
- A general view of Mayrègne
- Location of Mayrègne
- Location within France Location within Occitanie
- Coordinates: 42°50′41″N 0°32′25″E
- Country: France
- Region: Occitania
- Department: Haute-Garonne
- Arrondissement: Saint-Gaudens
- Canton: Bagnères-de-Luchon

Government
  - Mayor (2020–2026): Jean-François Sacaze
- Area^{1}: 5.19 km^{2} (2.00 sq mi)
- Elevation: 1,180 m (3,870 ft)
- Highest elevation: 1,914 m (6,280 ft)
- Lowest elevation: 1,120 m (3,670 ft)
- Population (2023): 28
  - Density: 5.4/km^{2} (14/sq mi)
- Time zone: UTC+01:00 (CET)
  - Summer (DST): UTC+02:00 (CEST)
- INSEE/Postal code: 31335 /31110
- ^{1} French Land Register data, which excludes lakes, ponds, glaciers > 1 km^{2} (0.386 sq mi or 247 acres) and river estuaries.

Mayrègne (French pronunciation: [meʁɛɲ]; Occitan: Mairenha) is a commune in the Haute-Garonne department in southwestern France.

== Population ==
Historical population
Year	Pop.	±% p.a.
1968	36	—
1975	35	−0.40%
1982	23	−5.82%
1990	21	−1.13%
1999	33	+5.15%
2007	25	−3.41%
2012	29	+3.01%
2017	25	−2.92%
2023	28	+1.91%
Source: INSEE

== See also ==
- Communes of the Haute-Garonne department
