= Binos =

- Commune
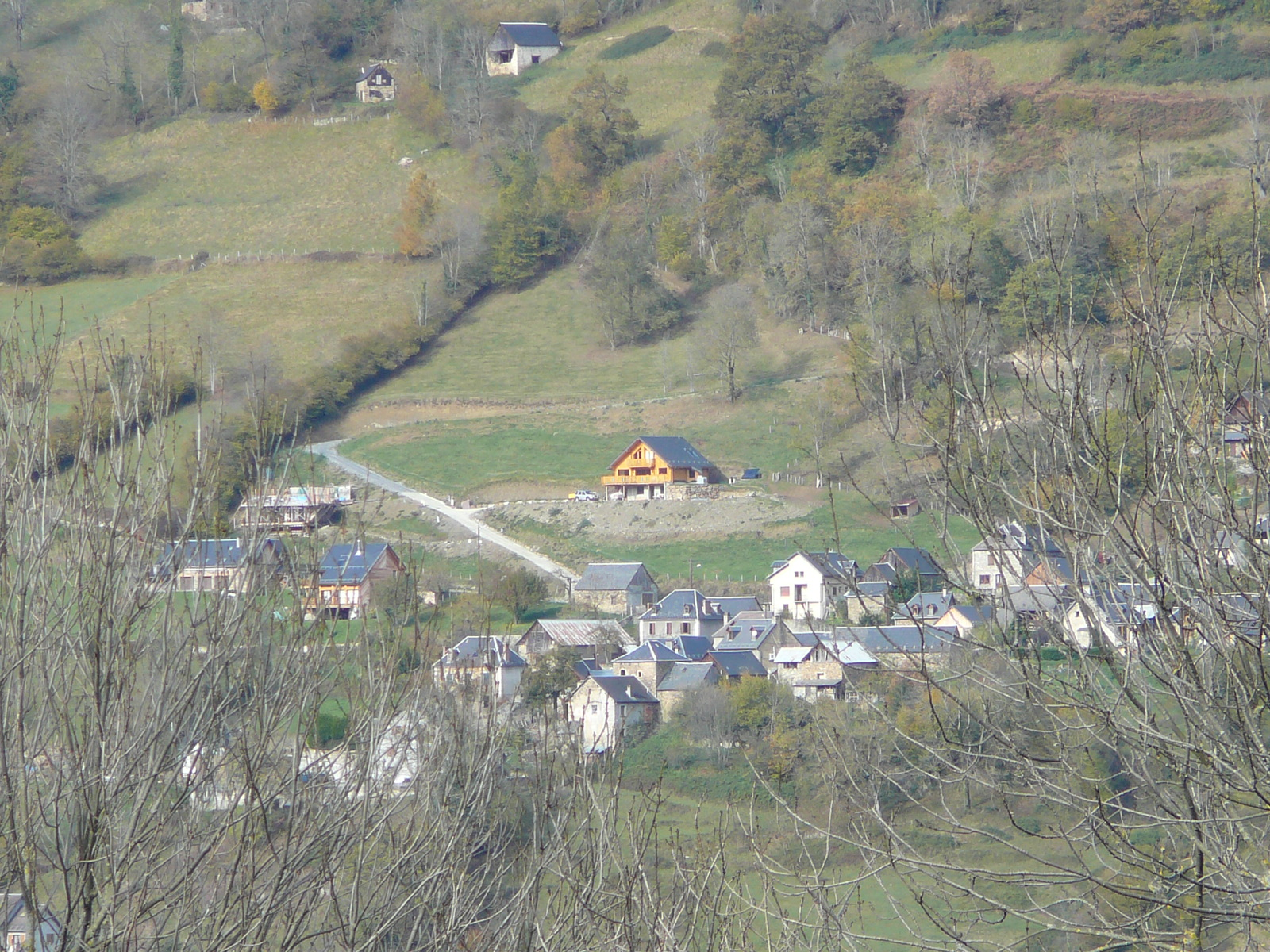
- A general view of Binos
- Location of Binos
- Location within France Location within Occitanie
- Coordinates: 42°54′07″N 0°37′05″E
- Country: France
- Region: Occitania
- Department: Haute-Garonne
- Arrondissement: Saint-Gaudens
- Canton: Bagnères-de-Luchon
- Intercommunality: Pyrénées Haut Garonnaises

Government
  - Mayor (2020–2026): Francis Guaus
- Area^{1}: 1.96 km^{2} (0.76 sq mi)
- Elevation: 700 m (2,300 ft)
- Highest elevation: 1,606 m (5,269 ft)
- Lowest elevation: 669 m (2,195 ft)
- Population (2023): 40
  - Density: 20/km^{2} (53/sq mi)
- Time zone: UTC+01:00 (CET)
  - Summer (DST): UTC+02:00 (CEST)
- INSEE/Postal code: 31590 /31440
- ^{1} French Land Register data, which excludes lakes, ponds, glaciers > 1 km^{2} (0.386 sq mi or 247 acres) and river estuaries.

Binos is a commune in the Haute-Garonne department of southwestern France. It was created in 1948 from part of the commune Bachos-Binos.

== Population ==
Historical population
Year	Pop.	±% p.a.
1968	35	—
1975	28	−3.14%
1982	26	−1.05%
1990	22	−2.07%
1999	18	−2.21%
2007	30	+6.59%
2012	42	+6.96%
2017	43	+0.47%
2023	40	−1.20%
Source: INSEE

== See also ==
- Communes of the Haute-Garonne department
