= Gouaux-de-Luchon =

- Commune
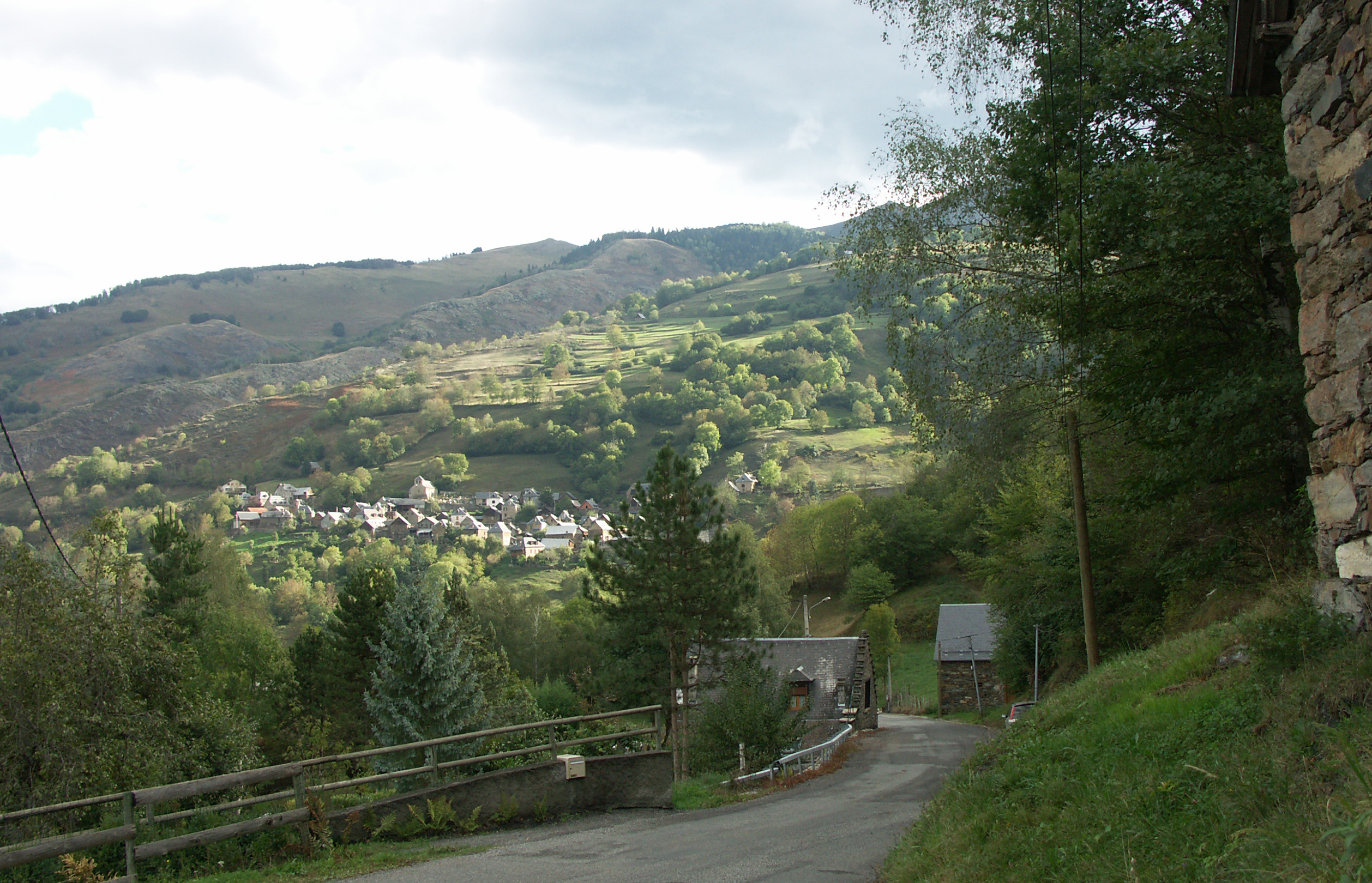
- A general view of Gouaux-de-Luchon
- Location of Gouaux-de-Luchon
- Location within France Location within Occitanie
- Coordinates: 42°51′25″N 0°37′16″E
- Country: France
- Region: Occitania
- Department: Haute-Garonne
- Arrondissement: Saint-Gaudens
- Canton: Bagnères-de-Luchon

Government
  - Mayor (2020–2026): Bernard Prince
- Area^{1}: 14.49 km^{2} (5.59 sq mi)
- Elevation: 850 m (2,790 ft)
- Highest elevation: 2,193 m (7,195 ft)
- Lowest elevation: 680 m (2,230 ft)
- Population (2023): 43
  - Density: 3.0/km^{2} (7.7/sq mi)
- Time zone: UTC+01:00 (CET)
  - Summer (DST): UTC+02:00 (CEST)
- INSEE/Postal code: 31222 /31110
- ^{1} French Land Register data, which excludes lakes, ponds, glaciers > 1 km^{2} (0.386 sq mi or 247 acres) and river estuaries.

Gouaux-de-Luchon (French pronunciation: [ɡwo də lyʃɔ̃]; Occitan: Guaus de Luishon) is a commune in the Haute-Garonne department in southwestern France. Surface area is 14.49 km².

== Population ==
Historical population
Year	Pop.	±% p.a.
1968	59	—
1975	53	−1.52%
1982	53	+0.00%
1990	46	−1.76%
1999	44	−0.49%
2007	44	+0.00%
2012	48	+1.76%
2017	46	−0.85%
2023	43	−1.12%
Source: INSEE

== See also ==
- Communes of the Haute-Garonne department
