= Billière =

- Commune
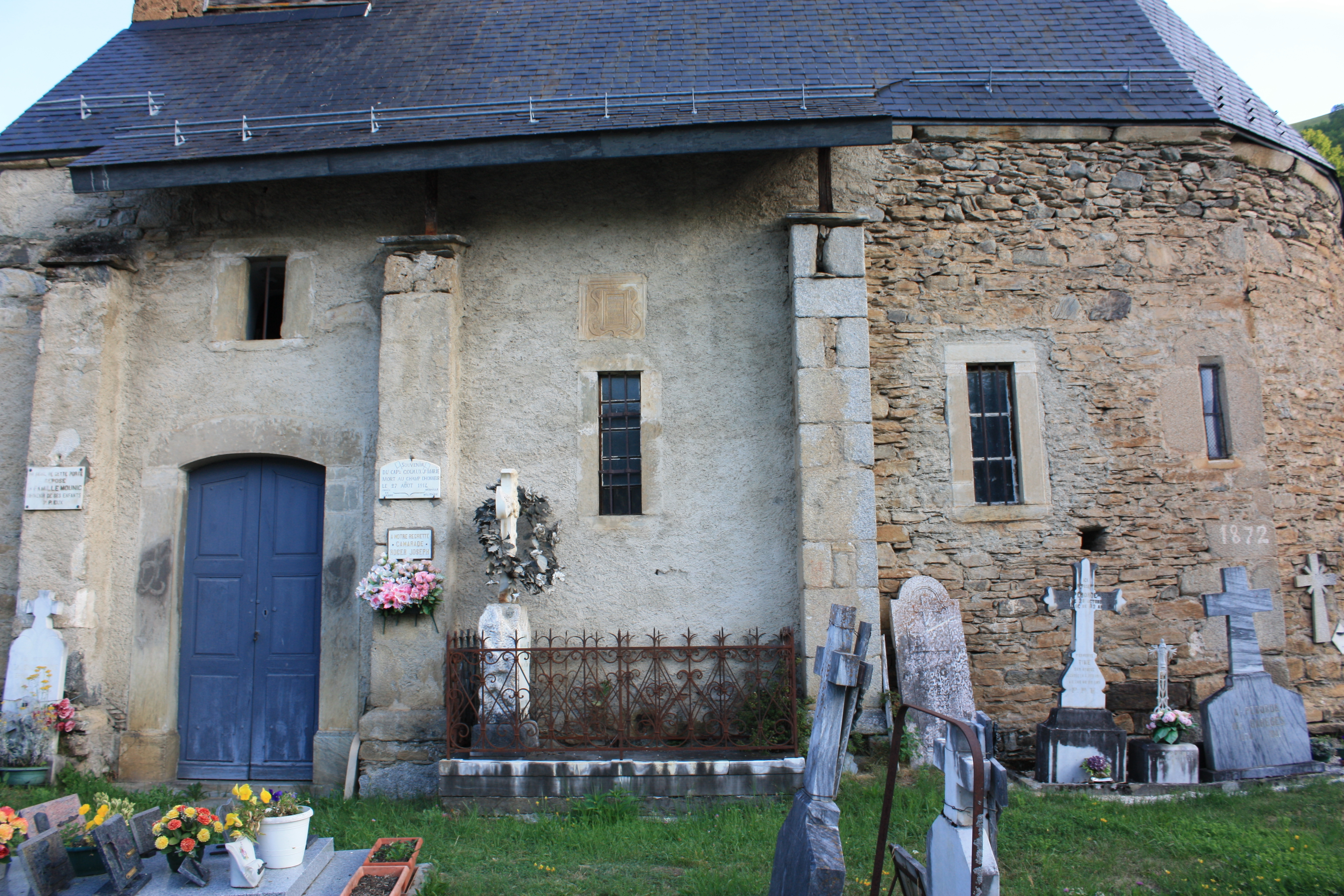
- The church in Billière
- Location of Billière
- Location within France Location within Occitanie
- Coordinates: 42°48′44″N 0°31′40″E
- Country: France
- Region: Occitania
- Department: Haute-Garonne
- Arrondissement: Saint-Gaudens
- Canton: Bagnères-de-Luchon

Government
  - Mayor (2020–2026): Céline Lafont
- Area^{1}: 2.18 km^{2} (0.84 sq mi)
- Elevation: 1,050 m (3,440 ft)
- Highest elevation: 1,806 m (5,925 ft)
- Lowest elevation: 1,021 m (3,350 ft)
- Population (2023): 32
  - Density: 15/km^{2} (38/sq mi)
- Time zone: UTC+01:00 (CET)
  - Summer (DST): UTC+02:00 (CEST)
- INSEE/Postal code: 31068 /31110
- ^{1} French Land Register data, which excludes lakes, ponds, glaciers > 1 km^{2} (0.386 sq mi or 247 acres) and river estuaries.

Billière is a commune in the Haute-Garonne department in southwestern France.

== Population ==
Historical population
Year	Pop.	±% p.a.
1968	32	—
1975	28	−1.89%
1982	22	−3.39%
1990	27	+2.59%
1999	25	−0.85%
2007	24	−0.51%
2012	24	+0.00%
2017	22	−1.73%
2023	32	+6.44%
Source: INSEE

== See also ==
- Communes of the Haute-Garonne department
