= Cier-de-Rivière =

- Commune
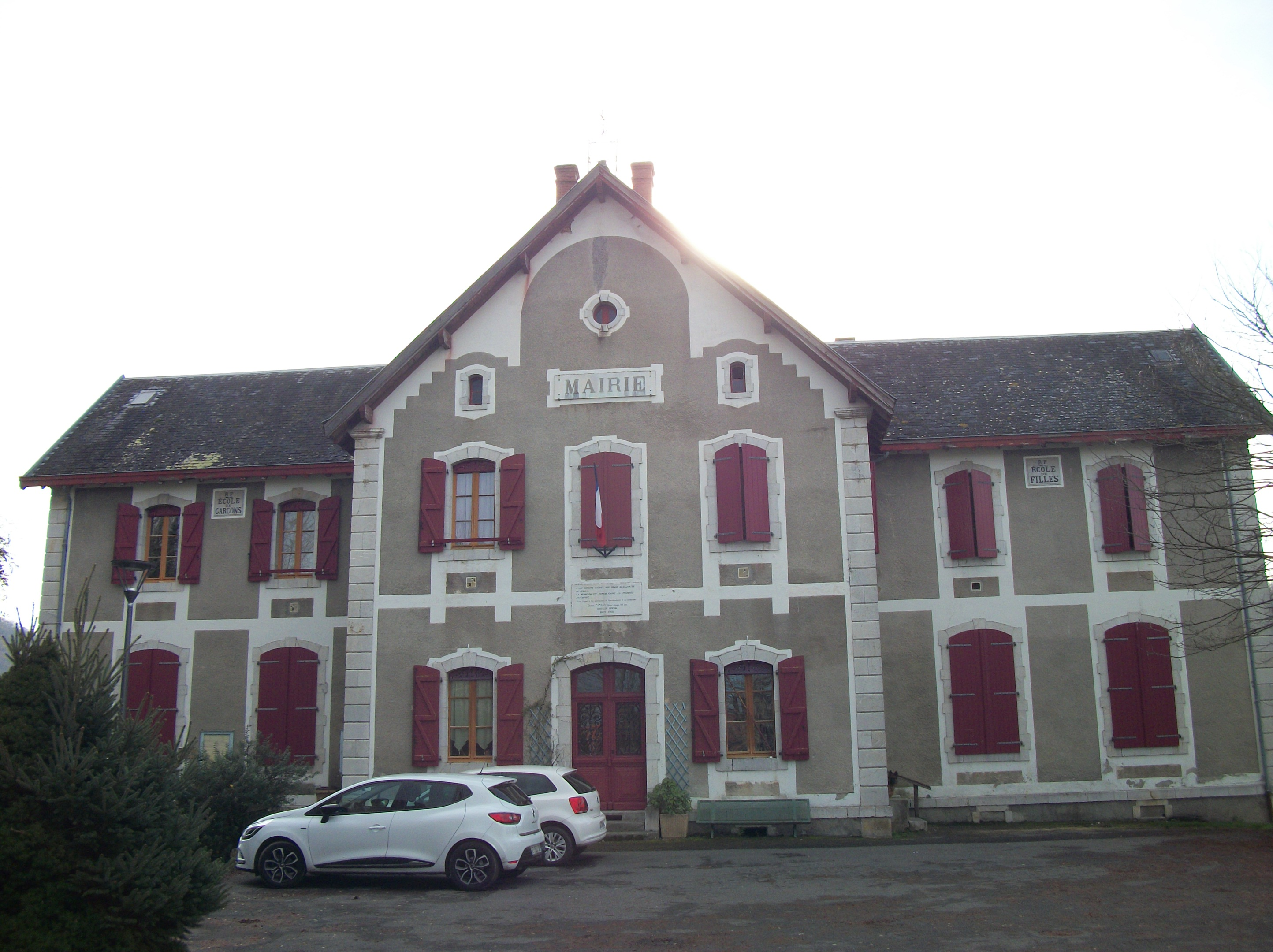
- The town hall in Cier-de-Rivière
- Location of Cier-de-Rivière
- Location within France Location within Occitanie
- Coordinates: 43°03′49″N 0°38′04″E
- Country: France
- Region: Occitania
- Department: Haute-Garonne
- Arrondissement: Saint-Gaudens
- Canton: Bagnères-de-Luchon

Government
  - Mayor (2020–2026): Murielle Exposito
- Area^{1}: 9.26 km^{2} (3.58 sq mi)
- Elevation: 490 m (1,610 ft)
- Highest elevation: 719 m (2,359 ft)
- Lowest elevation: 412 m (1,352 ft)
- Population (2023): 266
  - Density: 28.7/km^{2} (74.4/sq mi)
- Time zone: UTC+01:00 (CET)
  - Summer (DST): UTC+02:00 (CEST)
- INSEE/Postal code: 31143 /31510
- ^{1} French Land Register data, which excludes lakes, ponds, glaciers > 1 km^{2} (0.386 sq mi or 247 acres) and river estuaries.

Cier-de-Rivière (Occitan: Empresa de Riu) is a commune in the Haute-Garonne department in southwestern France.

== Population ==
Historical population
Year	Pop.	±% p.a.
1968	227	—
1975	228	+0.06%
1982	235	+0.43%
1990	249	+0.73%
1999	250	+0.04%
2007	247	−0.15%
2012	269	+1.72%
2017	279	+0.73%
2023	266	−0.79%
Source: INSEE

== See also ==
- Communes of the Haute-Garonne department
