= Arnaud-Guilhem =

- Commune
- Location of Arnaud-Guilhem
- Location within France Location within Occitanie
- Coordinates: 43°08′37″N 0°53′55″E
- Country: France
- Region: Occitania
- Department: Haute-Garonne
- Arrondissement: Saint-Gaudens
- Canton: Bagnères-de-Luchon
- Intercommunality: CC Cagire Garonne Salat

Government
  - Mayor (2020–2026): Jean-Pierre Vialatte
- Area^{1}: 7.70 km^{2} (2.97 sq mi)
- Elevation: 433 m (1,421 ft)
- Highest elevation: 463 m (1,519 ft)
- Lowest elevation: 279 m (915 ft)
- Population (2023): 230
  - Density: 30/km^{2} (77/sq mi)
- Time zone: UTC+01:00 (CET)
  - Summer (DST): UTC+02:00 (CEST)
- INSEE/Postal code: 31018 /31360
- ^{1} French Land Register data, which excludes lakes, ponds, glaciers > 1 km^{2} (0.386 sq mi or 247 acres) and river estuaries.

Arnaud-Guilhem is a commune in the Haute-Garonne department in southwestern France.

== Population ==
Historical population
Year	Pop.	±% p.a.
1968	198	—
1975	192	−0.44%
1982	191	−0.07%
1990	191	+0.00%
1999	167	−1.48%
2007	196	+2.02%
2012	228	+3.07%
2017	231	+0.26%
2023	230	−0.07%
Source: INSEE

== See also ==
- Communes of the Haute-Garonne department
