= Cazarilh-Laspènes =

- Commune
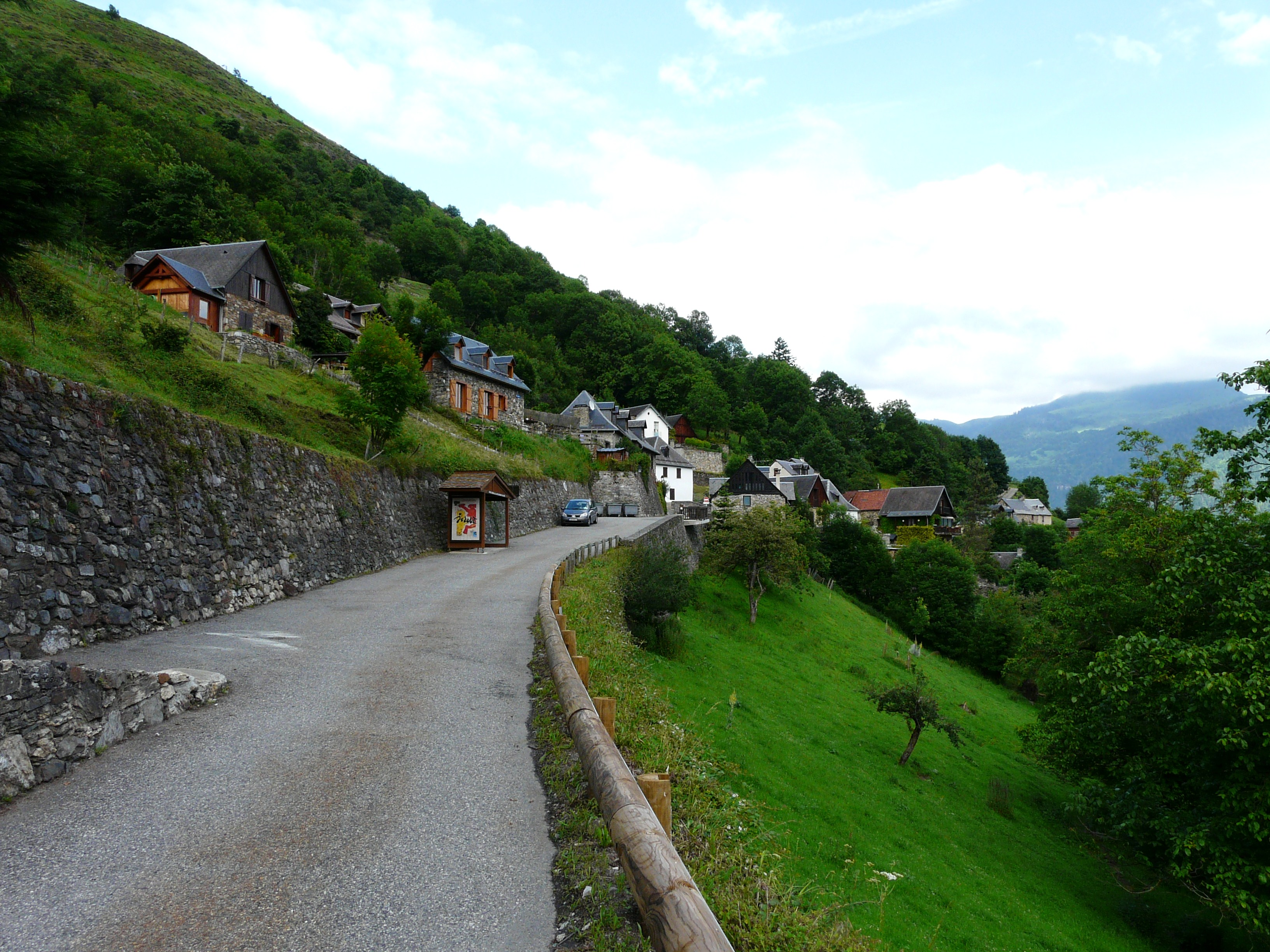
- A general view of Cazarilh-Laspènes
- Location of Cazarilh-Laspènes
- Location within France Location within Occitanie
- Coordinates: 42°48′39″N 0°34′42″E
- Country: France
- Region: Occitania
- Department: Haute-Garonne
- Arrondissement: Saint-Gaudens
- Canton: Bagnères-de-Luchon

Government
  - Mayor (2020–2026): Jean-Paul Denard
- Area^{1}: 2.37 km^{2} (0.92 sq mi)
- Elevation: 970 m (3,180 ft)
- Highest elevation: 1,560 m (5,120 ft)
- Lowest elevation: 672 m (2,205 ft)
- Population (2023): 13
  - Density: 5.5/km^{2} (14/sq mi)
- Time zone: UTC+01:00 (CET)
  - Summer (DST): UTC+02:00 (CEST)
- INSEE/Postal code: 31129 /31110
- ^{1} French Land Register data, which excludes lakes, ponds, glaciers > 1 km^{2} (0.386 sq mi or 247 acres) and river estuaries.

Cazarilh-Laspènes (French pronunciation: [kazaʁij laspɛn]; before 2014: Cazaril-Laspènes; Occitan: Cadelh e las Penas) is a commune in the Haute-Garonne department in southwestern France. Prior to 2014, It was known as Cazaril-Laspènes.

== Population ==
Historical population
Year	Pop.	±% p.a.
1968	30	—
1975	27	−1.49%
1982	17	−6.40%
1990	17	+0.00%
1999	19	+1.24%
2007	20	+0.64%
2012	25	+4.56%
2017	24	−0.81%
2023	13	−9.71%
Source: INSEE

== See also ==
- Communes of the Haute-Garonne department
