= Couret =

- Commune
- Location of Couret
- Location within France Location within Occitanie
- Coordinates: 43°03′04″N 0°49′12″E
- Country: France
- Region: Occitania
- Department: Haute-Garonne
- Arrondissement: Saint-Gaudens
- Canton: Bagnères-de-Luchon

Government
  - Mayor (2020–2026): Corinne Ortet
- Area^{1}: 4.34 km^{2} (1.68 sq mi)
- Elevation: 430 m (1,410 ft)
- Highest elevation: 602 m (1,975 ft)
- Lowest elevation: 370 m (1,210 ft)
- Population (2023): 233
  - Density: 53.7/km^{2} (139/sq mi)
- Time zone: UTC+01:00 (CET)
  - Summer (DST): UTC+02:00 (CEST)
- INSEE/Postal code: 31155 /31160
- ^{1} French Land Register data, which excludes lakes, ponds, glaciers > 1 km^{2} (0.386 sq mi or 247 acres) and river estuaries.

Couret is a commune in the Haute-Garonne department in southwestern France.

== Population ==
Historical population
Year	Pop.	±% p.a.
1968	140	—
1975	131	−0.94%
1982	208	+6.83%
1990	211	+0.18%
1999	195	−0.87%
2007	193	−0.13%
2012	218	+2.47%
2017	239	+1.86%
2023	233	−0.42%
Source: INSEE

== See also ==
- Communes of the Haute-Garonne department
