= Arguenos =

- Commune
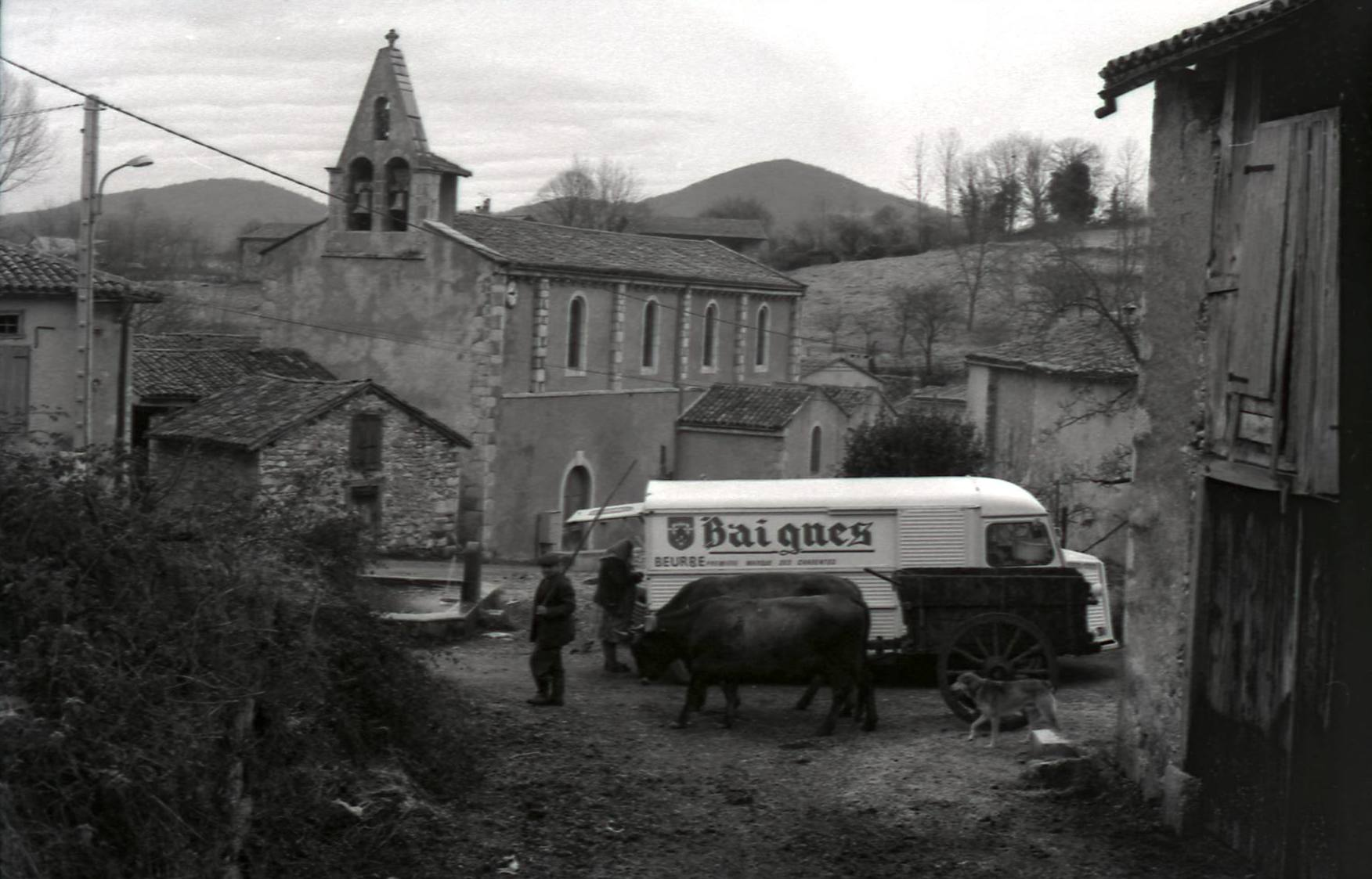
- Arguenos in 1978
- Location of Arguenos
- Location within France Location within Occitanie
- Coordinates: 42°58′19″N 0°43′29″E
- Country: France
- Region: Occitania
- Department: Haute-Garonne
- Arrondissement: Saint-Gaudens
- Canton: Bagnères-de-Luchon
- Intercommunality: CC Cagire Garonne Salat

Government
  - Mayor (2020–2026): Michelle Roux
- Area^{1}: 11.09 km^{2} (4.28 sq mi)
- Elevation: 580 m (1,900 ft)
- Highest elevation: 1,895 m (6,217 ft)
- Lowest elevation: 517 m (1,696 ft)
- Population (2023): 90
  - Density: 8.1/km^{2} (21/sq mi)
- Time zone: UTC+01:00 (CET)
  - Summer (DST): UTC+02:00 (CEST)
- INSEE/Postal code: 31014 /31160
- ^{1} French Land Register data, which excludes lakes, ponds, glaciers > 1 km^{2} (0.386 sq mi or 247 acres) and river estuaries.

Arguenos (French pronunciation: [aʁɡənos]; Occitan: Arguenòs) is a commune in the Haute-Garonne department in southwestern France.

== Population ==
Historical population
Year	Pop.	±% p.a.
1968	68	—
1975	52	−3.76%
1982	45	−2.04%
1990	48	+0.81%
1999	57	+1.93%
2007	50	−1.62%
2012	51	+0.40%
2017	72	+7.14%
2023	90	+3.79%
Source: INSEE

== See also ==
- Communes of the Haute-Garonne department
