= Burgalays =

- Commune
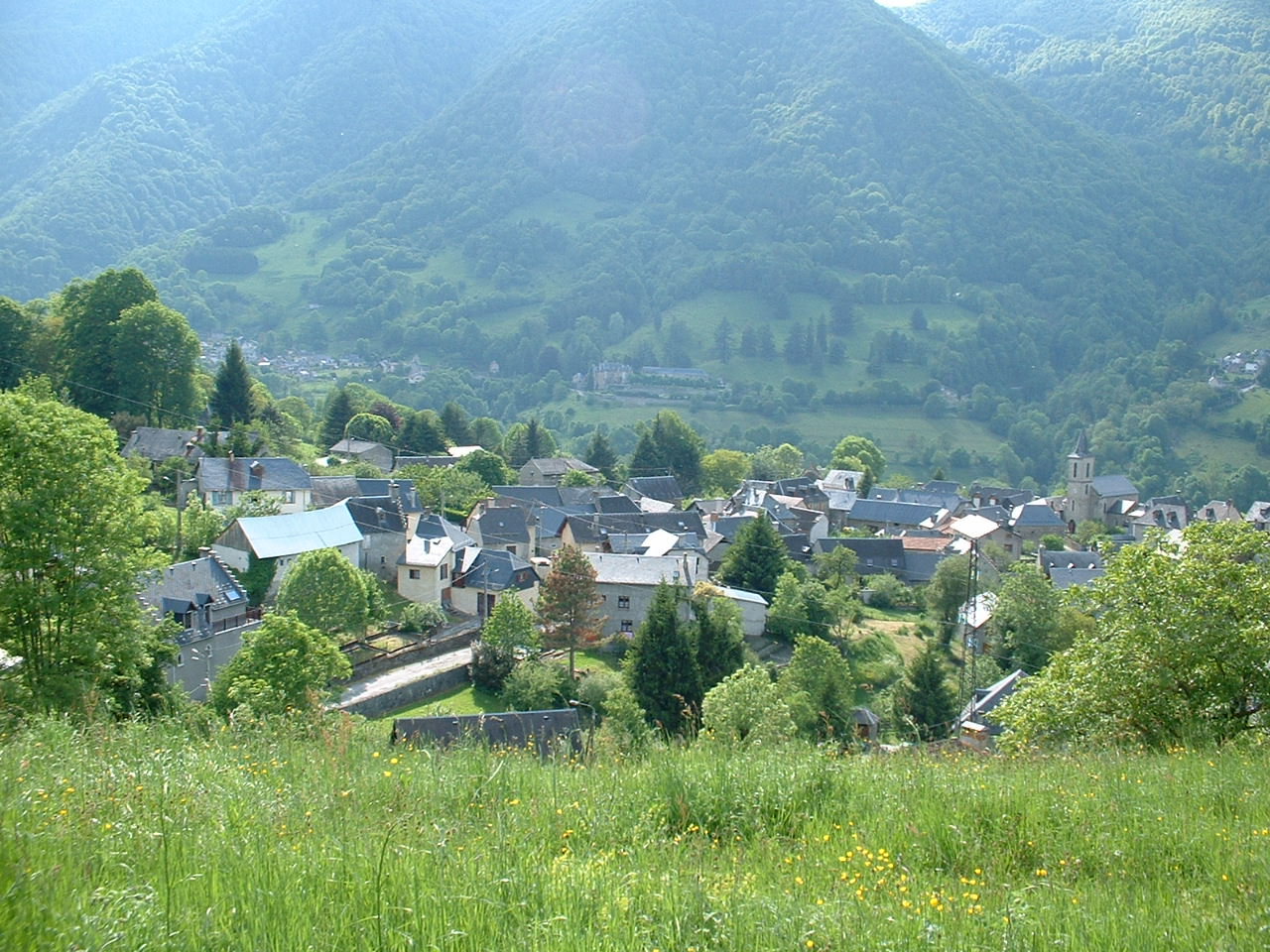
- A general view of Burgalays

- Coat of arms
- Location of Burgalays
- Location within France Location within Occitanie
- Coordinates: 42°53′37″N 0°37′49″E
- Country: France
- Region: Occitania
- Department: Haute-Garonne
- Arrondissement: Saint-Gaudens
- Canton: Bagnères-de-Luchon
- Intercommunality: Pyrénées Haut Garonnaises

Government
  - Mayor (2020–2026): Claude Castex
- Area^{1}: 5.05 km^{2} (1.95 sq mi)
- Elevation: 630 m (2,070 ft)
- Highest elevation: 1,731 m (5,679 ft)
- Lowest elevation: 519 m (1,703 ft)
- Population (2023): 124
  - Density: 24.6/km^{2} (63.6/sq mi)
- Time zone: UTC+01:00 (CET)
  - Summer (DST): UTC+02:00 (CEST)
- INSEE/Postal code: 31092 /31440
- ^{1} French Land Register data, which excludes lakes, ponds, glaciers > 1 km^{2} (0.386 sq mi or 247 acres) and river estuaries.

Burgalays is a commune in the Haute-Garonne department in southwestern France.

== Population ==
Historical population
Year	Pop.	±% p.a.
1968	121	—
1975	112	−1.10%
1982	97	−2.03%
1990	113	+1.93%
1999	115	+0.20%
2007	124	+0.95%
2012	132	+1.26%
2017	123	−1.40%
2023	124	+0.14%
Source: INSEE

== See also ==
- Communes of the Haute-Garonne department
