= Arbon, Haute-Garonne =

Arbon
- Commune
- Location of Arbon
- Location within France Location within Occitanie
- Coordinates: 43°00′05″N 0°44′52″E
- Country: France
- Region: Occitania
- Department: Haute-Garonne
- Arrondissement: Saint-Gaudens
- Canton: Bagnères-de-Luchon

Government
  - Mayor (2020–2026): André Esparbes
- Area^{1}: 4.47 km^{2} (1.73 sq mi)
- Elevation: 580 m (1,900 ft)
- Highest elevation: 896 m (2,940 ft)
- Lowest elevation: 468 m (1,535 ft)
- Population (2023): 93
  - Density: 21/km^{2} (54/sq mi)
- Time zone: UTC+01:00 (CET)
  - Summer (DST): UTC+02:00 (CEST)
- INSEE/Postal code: 31012 /31160
- ^{1} French Land Register data, which excludes lakes, ponds, glaciers > 1 km^{2} (0.386 sq mi or 247 acres) and river estuaries.

Arbon (French pronunciation: [aʁbɔ̃]) is a commune in the Haute-Garonne department in southwestern France.

== Population ==
Historical population
Year	Pop.	±% p.a.
1968	94	—
1975	98	+0.60%
1982	78	−3.21%
1990	67	−1.88%
1999	76	+1.41%
2007	67	−1.56%
2012	91	+6.31%
2017	102	+2.31%
2023	93	−1.53%
Source: INSEE

== See also ==
- Communes of the Haute-Garonne department
