= Poubeau =

- Commune
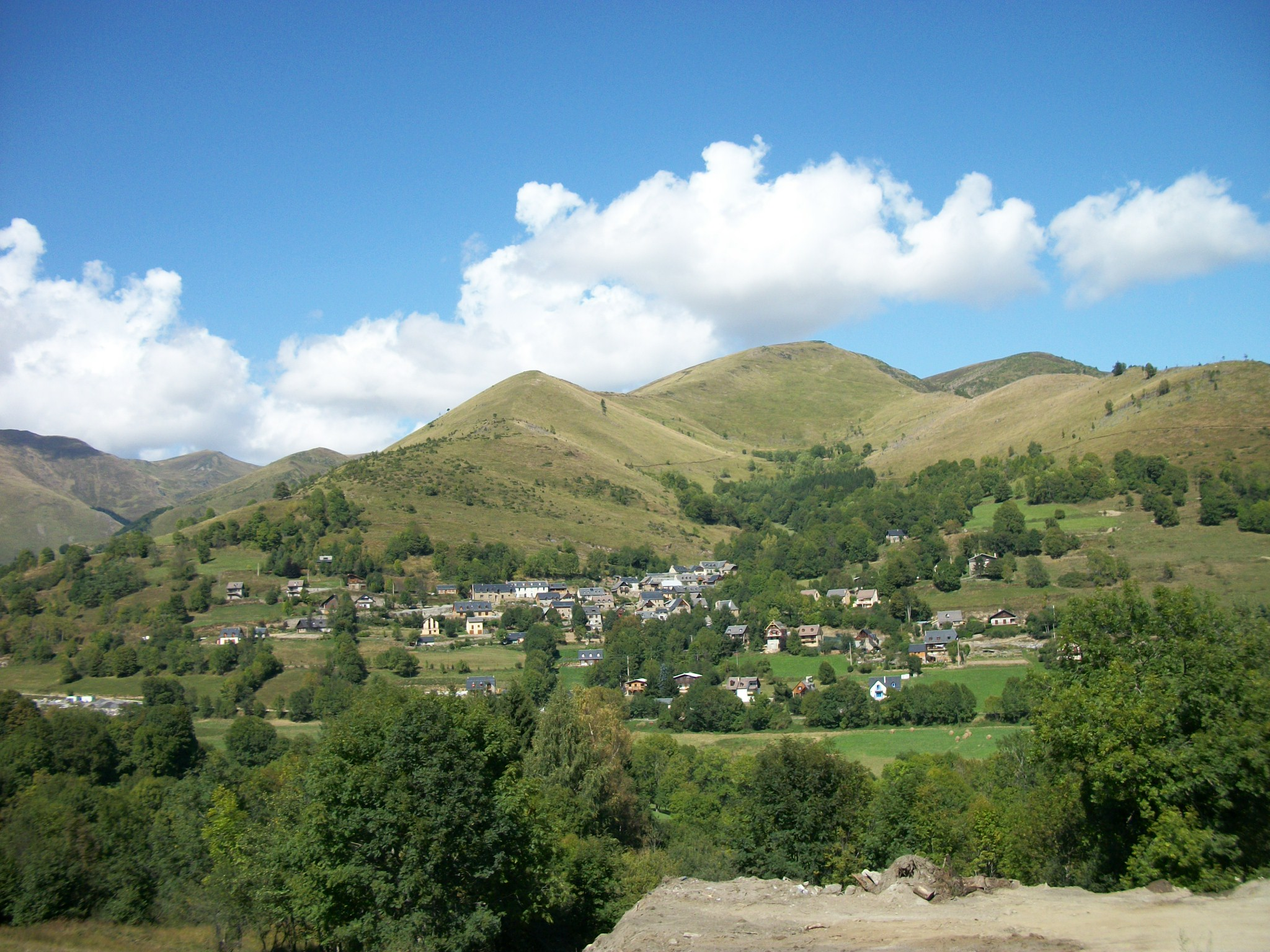
- A general view of Poubeau
- Location of Poubeau
- Location within France Location within Occitanie
- Coordinates: 42°48′50″N 0°29′54″E
- Country: France
- Region: Occitania
- Department: Haute-Garonne
- Arrondissement: Saint-Gaudens
- Canton: Bagnères-de-Luchon

Government
  - Mayor (2020–2026): Gérard Saporte
- Area^{1}: 4.21 km^{2} (1.63 sq mi)
- Elevation: 1,238 m (4,062 ft)
- Highest elevation: 1,974 m (6,476 ft)
- Lowest elevation: 1,181 m (3,875 ft)
- Population (2023): 78
  - Density: 19/km^{2} (48/sq mi)
- Time zone: UTC+01:00 (CET)
  - Summer (DST): UTC+02:00 (CEST)
- INSEE/Postal code: 31434 /31110
- ^{1} French Land Register data, which excludes lakes, ponds, glaciers > 1 km^{2} (0.386 sq mi or 247 acres) and river estuaries.

Poubeau (French pronunciation: [pubo]; Occitan: Pobòu) is a commune in the Haute-Garonne department in southwestern France.

== Population ==
Historical population
Year	Pop.	±% p.a.
1968	11	—
1975	10	−1.35%
1982	30	+16.99%
1990	39	+3.33%
1999	53	+3.47%
2007	67	+2.97%
2012	73	+1.73%
2017	76	+0.81%
2023	78	+0.43%
Source: INSEE

== See also ==
- Communes of the Haute-Garonne department
