= Saleich =

- Commune
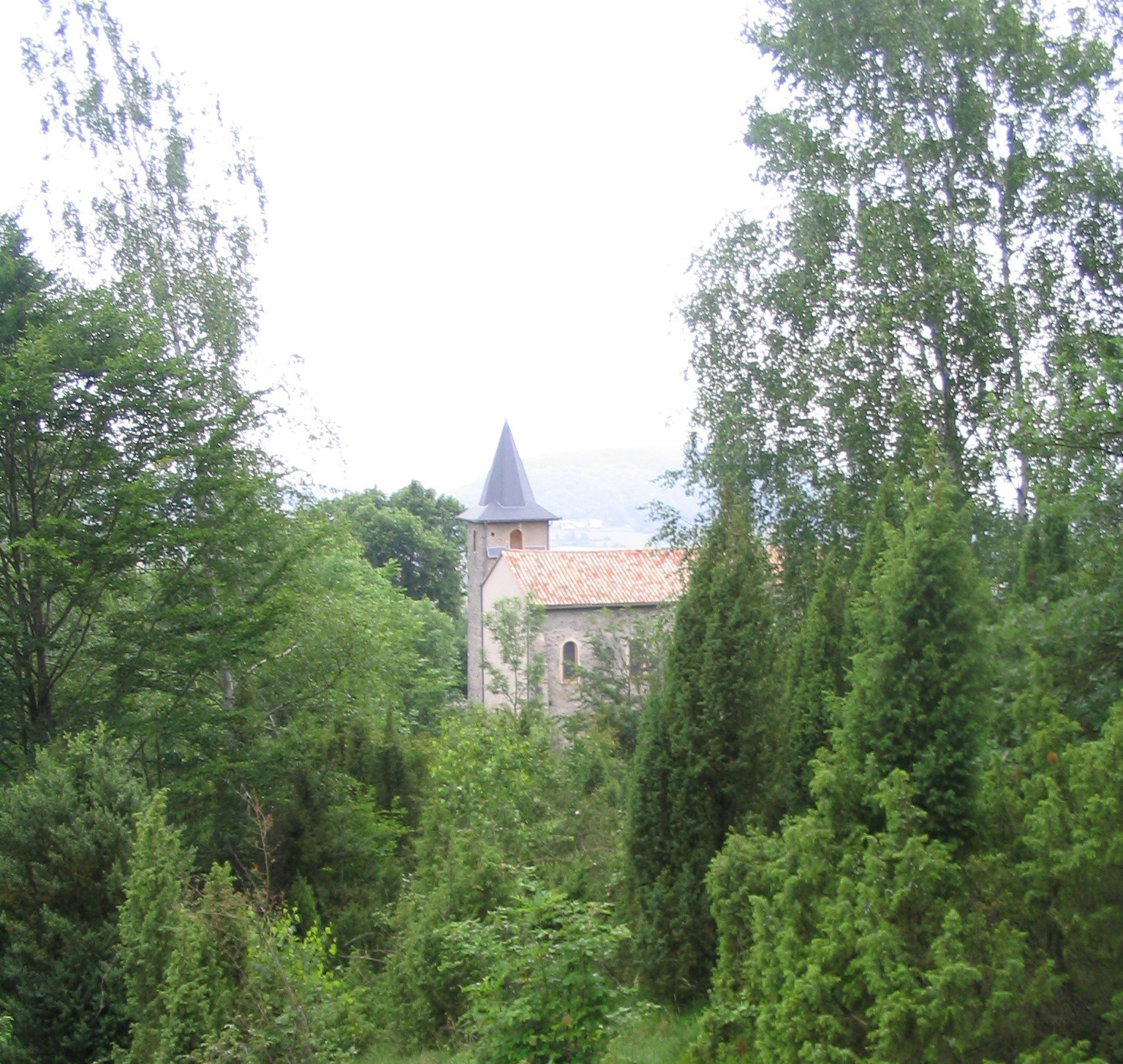
- The chapel of Vallates
- Location of Saleich
- Location within France Location within Occitanie
- Coordinates: 43°01′35″N 0°58′16″E
- Country: France
- Region: Occitania
- Department: Haute-Garonne
- Arrondissement: Saint-Gaudens
- Canton: Bagnères-de-Luchon
- Intercommunality: Cagire Garonne Salat

Government
  - Mayor (2020–2026): Gilles Junquet
- Area^{1}: 14.29 km^{2} (5.52 sq mi)
- Elevation: 415 m (1,362 ft)
- Highest elevation: 1,166 m (3,825 ft)
- Lowest elevation: 326 m (1,070 ft)
- Population (2023): 335
  - Density: 23.4/km^{2} (60.7/sq mi)
- Time zone: UTC+01:00 (CET)
  - Summer (DST): UTC+02:00 (CEST)
- INSEE/Postal code: 31521 /31260
- ^{1} French Land Register data, which excludes lakes, ponds, glaciers > 1 km^{2} (0.386 sq mi or 247 acres) and river estuaries.

Saleich is a commune in the Haute-Garonne department in southwestern France.

== Population ==
Historical population
Year	Pop.	±% p.a.
1968	382	—
1975	342	−1.57%
1982	316	−1.12%
1990	357	+1.54%
1999	361	+0.12%
2007	381	+0.68%
2012	361	−1.07%
2017	341	−1.13%
2023	335	−0.30%
Source: INSEE

== See also ==
- Communes of the Haute-Garonne department
