= Chein-Dessus =

- Commune
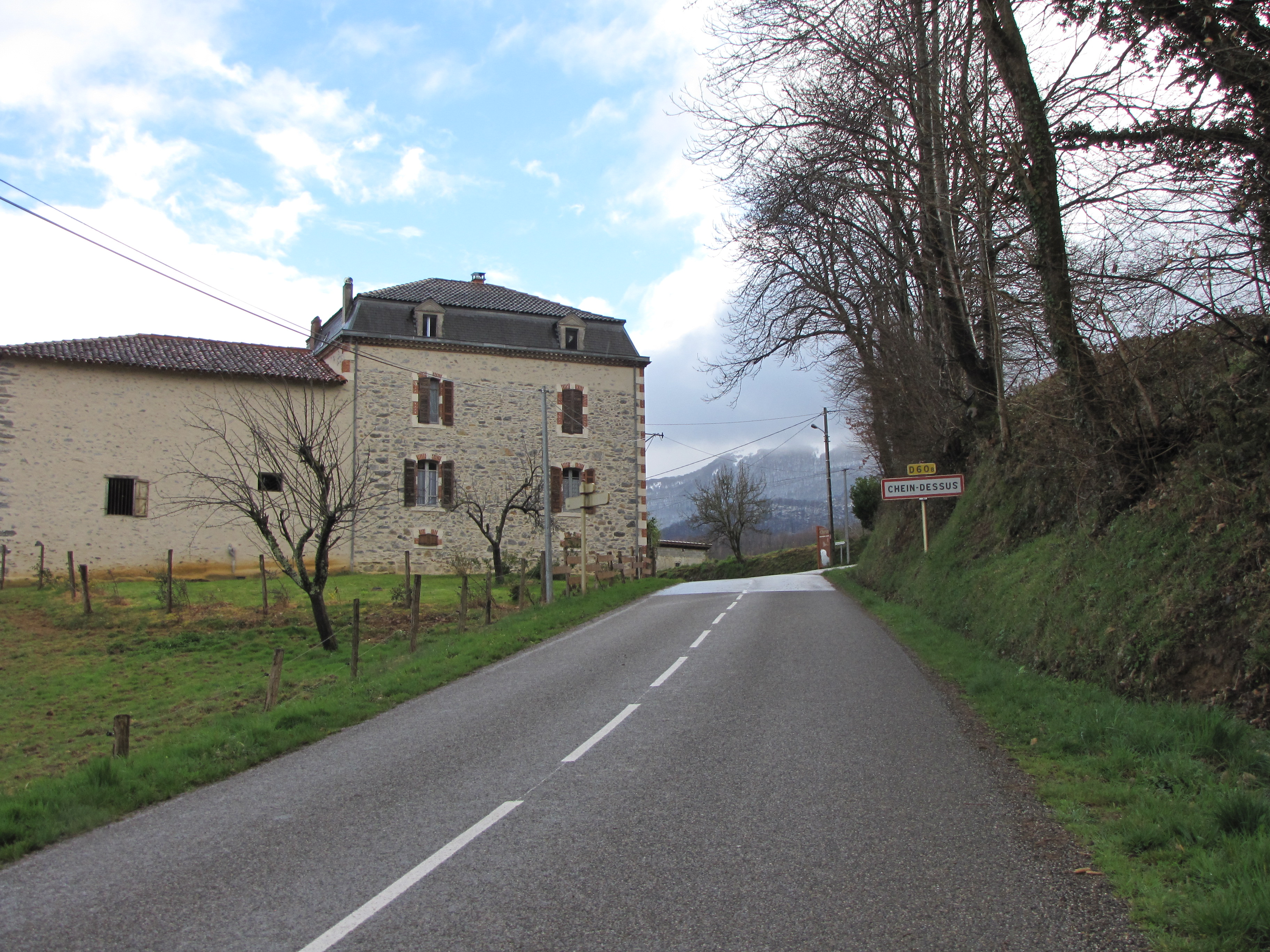
- The road into Chein-Dessus
- Location of Chein-Dessus
- Location within France Location within Occitanie
- Coordinates: 43°01′12″N 0°53′06″E
- Country: France
- Region: Occitania
- Department: Haute-Garonne
- Arrondissement: Saint-Gaudens
- Canton: Bagnères-de-Luchon

Government
  - Mayor (2020–2026): Michel Rouch
- Area^{1}: 12.69 km^{2} (4.90 sq mi)
- Elevation: 480 m (1,570 ft)
- Highest elevation: 1,353 m (4,439 ft)
- Lowest elevation: 378 m (1,240 ft)
- Population (2023): 209
  - Density: 16.5/km^{2} (42.7/sq mi)
- Time zone: UTC+01:00 (CET)
  - Summer (DST): UTC+02:00 (CEST)
- INSEE/Postal code: 31140 /31160
- ^{1} French Land Register data, which excludes lakes, ponds, glaciers > 1 km^{2} (0.386 sq mi or 247 acres) and river estuaries.

Chein-Dessus (French pronunciation: [ʃɛ̃ dəsy]; Occitan: Shenh Dessús) is a commune in the Haute-Garonne department in southwestern France.

== Population ==
Historical population
Year	Pop.	±% p.a.
1968	239	—
1975	213	−1.63%
1982	209	−0.27%
1990	200	−0.55%
1999	184	−0.92%
2007	195	+0.73%
2012	192	−0.31%
2017	182	−1.06%
2023	209	+2.33%
Source: INSEE

== See also ==
- Communes of the Haute-Garonne department
