= Canton of Bagnères-de-Luchon =

Coordinates: 42.79°N 0.59°E

The canton of Bagnères-de-Luchon is an administrative division of the Haute-Garonne department, southern France. Its borders were modified at the French canton reorganisation which came into effect in March 2015. Its seat is in Bagnères-de-Luchon.

It consists of the following communes:

1. Antichan-de-Frontignes
2. Antignac
3. Arbas
4. Arbon
5. Ardiège
6. Arguenos
7. Argut-Dessous
8. Arlos
9. Arnaud-Guilhem
10. Artigue
11. Aspet
12. Ausseing
13. Auzas
14. Bachos
15. Bagiry
16. Bagnères-de-Luchon
17. Barbazan
18. Baren
19. Beauchalot
20. Belbèze-en-Comminges
21. Benque-Dessous-et-Dessus
22. Bezins-Garraux
23. Billière
24. Binos
25. Bourg-d'Oueil
26. Boutx
27. Burgalays
28. Cabanac-Cazaux
29. Cassagne
30. Castagnède
31. Castelbiague
32. Castillon-de-Larboust
33. Castillon-de-Saint-Martory
34. Cathervielle
35. Caubous
36. Cazarilh-Laspènes
37. Cazaunous
38. Cazaux-Layrisse
39. Cazeaux-de-Larboust
40. Chaum
41. Chein-Dessus
42. Cier-de-Luchon
43. Cier-de-Rivière
44. Cierp-Gaud
45. Cirès
46. Couret
47. Encausse-les-Thermes
48. Escoulis
49. Estadens
50. Esténos
51. Eup
52. Figarol
53. Fos
54. Fougaron
55. Francazal
56. Le Fréchet
57. Fronsac
58. Frontignan-de-Comminges
59. Galié
60. Ganties
61. Garin
62. Génos
63. Gouaux-de-Larboust
64. Gouaux-de-Luchon
65. Gourdan-Polignan
66. Guran
67. Herran
68. His
69. Huos
70. Izaut-de-l'Hôtel
71. Jurvielle
72. Juzet-de-Luchon
73. Juzet-d'Izaut
74. Labroquère
75. Laffite-Toupière
76. Lège
77. Lestelle-de-Saint-Martory
78. Lourde
79. Luscan
80. Malvezie
81. Mancioux
82. Mane
83. Marignac
84. Marsoulas
85. Martres-de-Rivière
86. Mayrègne
87. Mazères-sur-Salat
88. Melles
89. Milhas
90. Moncaup
91. Mont-de-Galié
92. Montastruc-de-Salies
93. Montauban-de-Luchon
94. Montespan
95. Montgaillard-de-Salies
96. Montsaunès
97. Moustajon
98. Oô
99. Ore
100. Payssous
101. Pointis-de-Rivière
102. Portet-d'Aspet
103. Portet-de-Luchon
104. Poubeau
105. Proupiary
106. Razecueillé
107. Roquefort-sur-Garonne
108. Rouède
109. Saccourvielle
110. Saint-Aventin
111. Saint-Béat-Lez
112. Saint-Bertrand-de-Comminges
113. Saint-Mamet
114. Saint-Martory
115. Saint-Médard
116. Saint-Paul-d'Oueil
117. Saint-Pé-d'Ardet
118. Saleich
119. Salies-du-Salat
120. Salles-et-Pratviel
121. Sauveterre-de-Comminges
122. Seilhan
123. Sengouagnet
124. Sepx
125. Signac
126. Sode
127. Soueich
128. Touille
129. Trébons-de-Luchon
130. Urau
131. Valcabrère
