= Pointis-Inard =

- Commune
- Coat of arms
- Location of Pointis-Inard
- Location within France Location within Occitanie
- Coordinates: 43°05′13″N 0°48′45″E
- Country: France
- Region: Occitania
- Department: Haute-Garonne
- Arrondissement: Saint-Gaudens
- Canton: Saint-Gaudens

Government
  - Mayor (2020–2026): Didier Treinque
- Area^{1}: 14.66 km^{2} (5.66 sq mi)
- Elevation: 325 m (1,066 ft)
- Highest elevation: 489 m (1,604 ft)
- Lowest elevation: 319 m (1,047 ft)
- Population (2023): 919
  - Density: 62.7/km^{2} (162/sq mi)
- Time zone: UTC+01:00 (CET)
  - Summer (DST): UTC+02:00 (CEST)
- INSEE/Postal code: 31427 /31800
- ^{1} French Land Register data, which excludes lakes, ponds, glaciers > 1 km^{2} (0.386 sq mi or 247 acres) and river estuaries.

Pointis-Inard (French pronunciation: [pwɛ̃tis inaʁ]; Occitan: Puntís d'Inard) is a commune in the Haute-Garonne department in southwestern France.

== Geography ==
The commune is bordered by eight other communes: Estancarbon to the north, Labarthe-Inard to the northeast, Montespan to the east, Ganties to the southeast, Soueich to the south, Lespiteau to southwest, Rieucazé to the west, and finally by Miramont-de-Comminges to the northwest.

The Chapel of Our Lady of Brouls delimits the southern boundary.

== Population ==
Historical population
Year	Pop.	±% p.a.
1968	663	—
1975	616	−1.04%
1982	650	+0.77%
1990	688	+0.71%
1999	740	+0.81%
2007	789	+0.80%
2012	854	+1.60%
2017	924	+1.59%
2023	919	−0.09%
Source: INSEE

== See also ==
- Communes of the Haute-Garonne department
