= Saint-Lary-Boujean =

- Commune
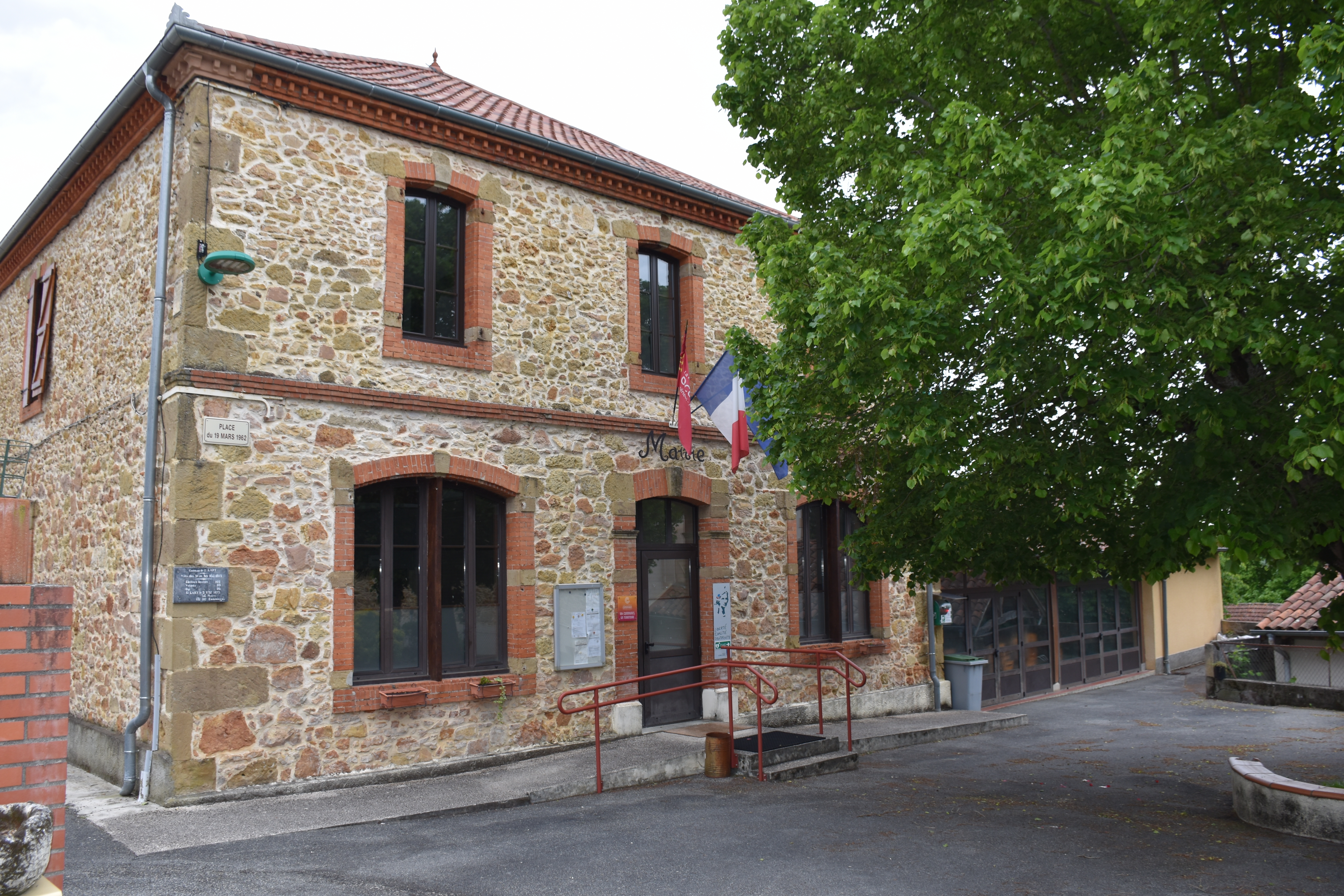
- Saint-Lary-Boujean Town hall
- Location of Saint-Lary-Boujean
- Location within France Location within Occitanie
- Coordinates: 43°13′47″N 0°44′12″E
- Country: France
- Region: Occitania
- Department: Haute-Garonne
- Arrondissement: Saint-Gaudens
- Canton: Saint-Gaudens

Government
  - Mayor (2020–2026): Régis Farré
- Area^{1}: 8.39 km^{2} (3.24 sq mi)
- Elevation: 392 m (1,286 ft)
- Highest elevation: 431 m (1,414 ft)
- Lowest elevation: 315 m (1,033 ft)
- Population (2023): 127
  - Density: 15.1/km^{2} (39.2/sq mi)
- Time zone: UTC+01:00 (CET)
  - Summer (DST): UTC+02:00 (CEST)
- INSEE/Postal code: 31493 /31350
- ^{1} French Land Register data, which excludes lakes, ponds, glaciers > 1 km^{2} (0.386 sq mi or 247 acres) and river estuaries.

Saint-Lary-Boujean (French pronunciation: [sɛ̃ laʁi buʒɑ̃]; Gascon: Sent Lari e Bojan) is a commune in the Haute-Garonne department in southwestern France.

== Population ==
Historical population
Year	Pop.	±% p.a.
1968	129	—
1975	129	+0.00%
1982	127	−0.22%
1990	137	+0.95%
1999	116	−1.83%
2007	112	−0.44%
2012	132	+3.34%
2017	141	+1.33%
2023	127	−1.73%
Source: INSEE

== See also ==
- Communes of the Haute-Garonne department
