= Cuguron =

- Commune
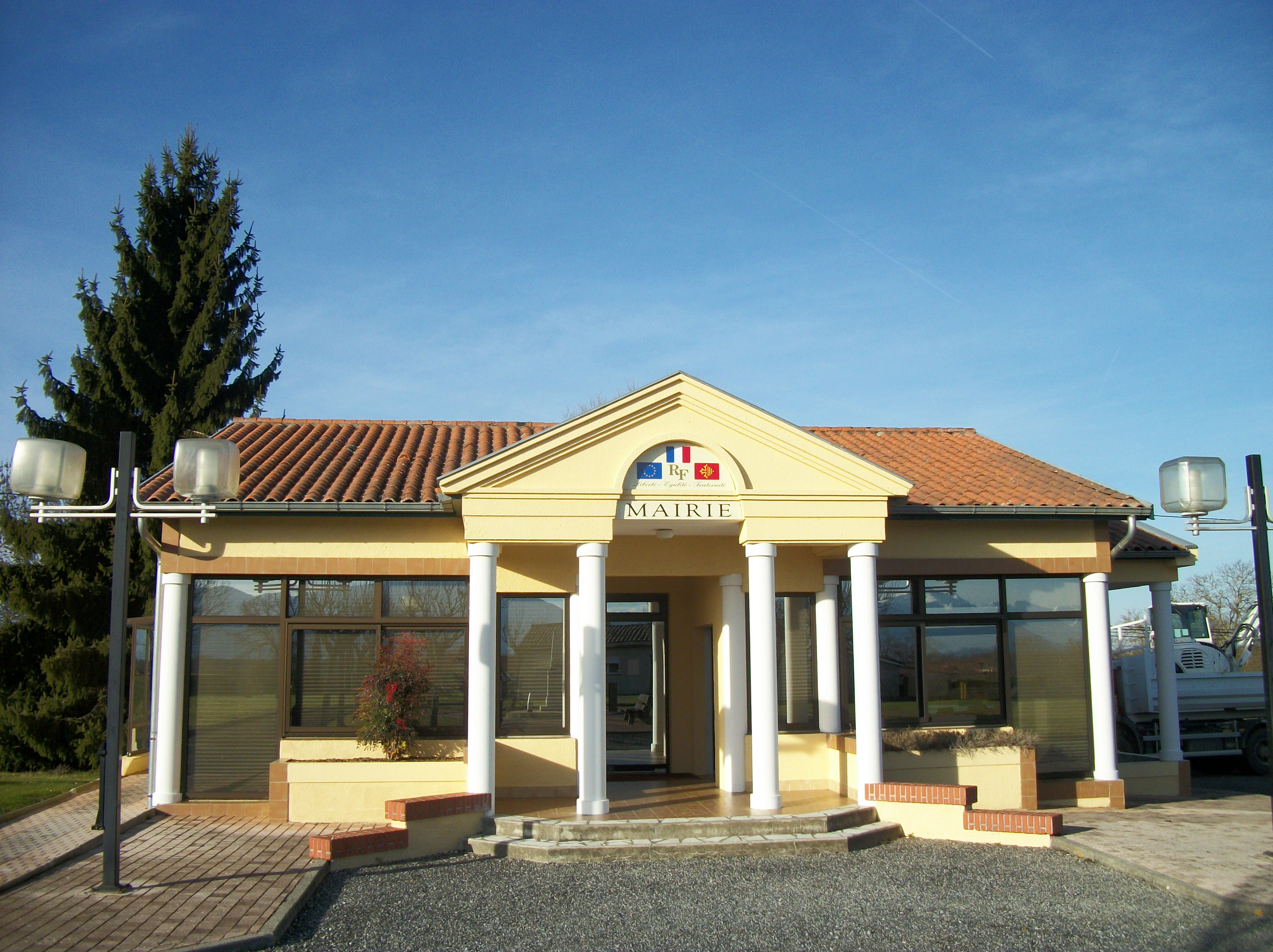
- The town hall in Cuguron
- Location of Cuguron
- Location within France Location within Occitanie
- Coordinates: 43°06′03″N 0°32′29″E
- Country: France
- Region: Occitania
- Department: Haute-Garonne
- Arrondissement: Saint-Gaudens
- Canton: Saint-Gaudens

Government
  - Mayor (2020–2026): Christine Santamaria
- Area^{1}: 7.07 km^{2} (2.73 sq mi)
- Elevation: 540 m (1,770 ft)
- Highest elevation: 568 m (1,864 ft)
- Lowest elevation: 454 m (1,490 ft)
- Population (2023): 161
  - Density: 22.8/km^{2} (59.0/sq mi)
- Time zone: UTC+01:00 (CET)
  - Summer (DST): UTC+02:00 (CEST)
- INSEE/Postal code: 31158 /31210
- ^{1} French Land Register data, which excludes lakes, ponds, glaciers > 1 km^{2} (0.386 sq mi or 247 acres) and river estuaries.

Cuguron (French pronunciation: [kyɡyʁɔ̃]) is a commune in the Haute-Garonne department in southwestern France.

== Population ==
Historical population
| Year | Pop. | ±% p.a. |
|---|---|---|
| 1968 | 203 | — |
| 1975 | 197 | −0.43% |
| 1982 | 181 | −1.20% |
| 1990 | 179 | −0.14% |
| 1999 | 176 | −0.19% |
| 2007 | 182 | +0.42% |
| 2012 | 195 | +1.39% |
| 2017 | 185 | −1.05% |
| 2023 | 161 | −2.29% |
Source: INSEE

== See also ==
- Communes of the Haute-Garonne department
