= Ciadoux =

- Commune
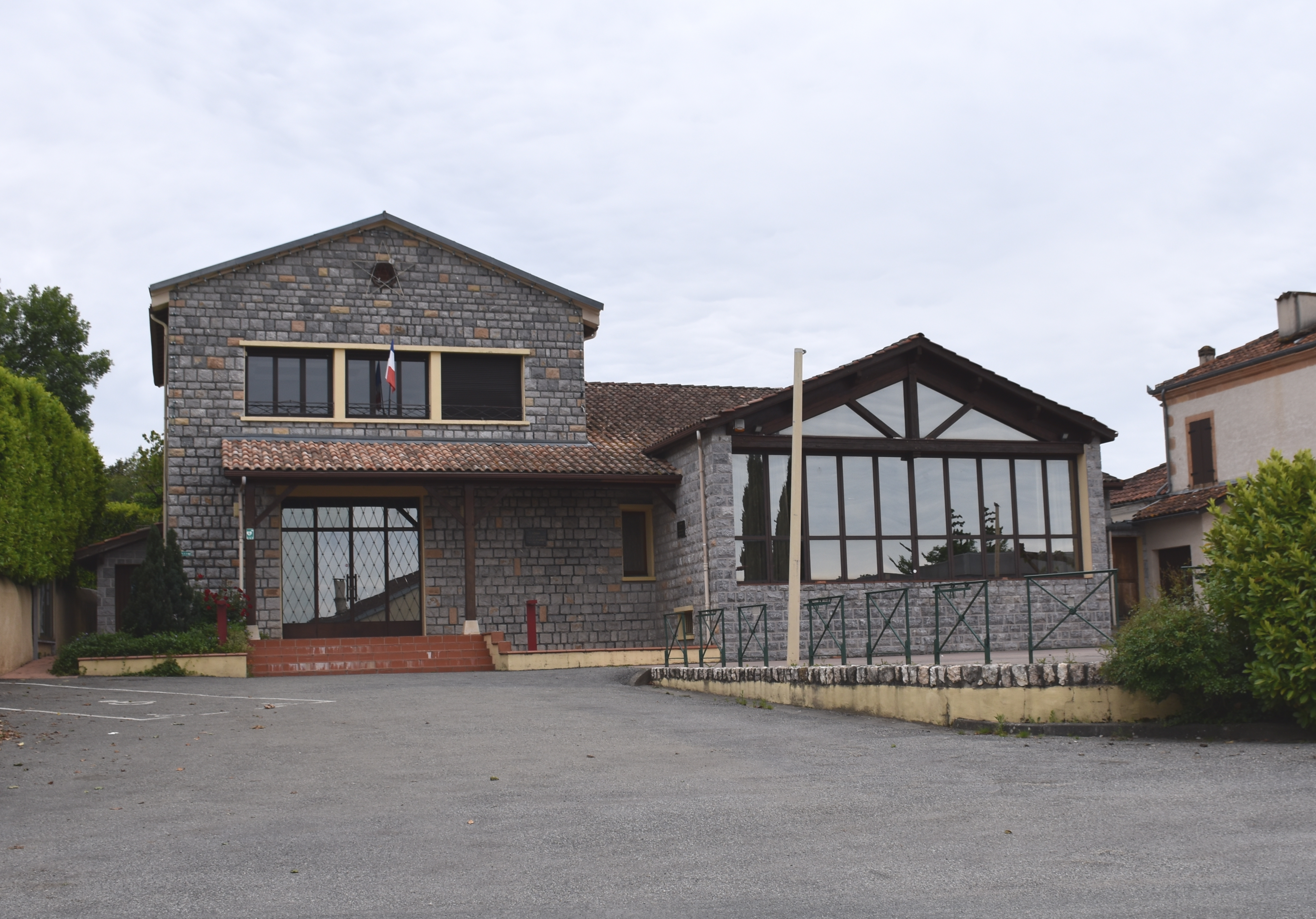
- Ciadoux Town hall

- Coat of arms
- Location of Ciadoux
- Location within France Location within Occitanie
- Coordinates: 43°15′35″N 0°44′17″E
- Country: France
- Region: Occitania
- Department: Haute-Garonne
- Arrondissement: Saint-Gaudens
- Canton: Saint-Gaudens

Government
  - Mayor (2020–2026): Thierry Toubert
- Area^{1}: 9.73 km^{2} (3.76 sq mi)
- Elevation: 350 m (1,150 ft)
- Highest elevation: 382 m (1,253 ft)
- Lowest elevation: 252 m (827 ft)
- Population (2023): 234
  - Density: 24.0/km^{2} (62.3/sq mi)
- Time zone: UTC+01:00 (CET)
  - Summer (DST): UTC+02:00 (CEST)
- INSEE/Postal code: 31141 /31350
- ^{1} French Land Register data, which excludes lakes, ponds, glaciers > 1 km^{2} (0.386 sq mi or 247 acres) and river estuaries.

Ciadoux (French pronunciation: [sjadu]; Occitan: Siadors) is a commune in the Haute-Garonne department in southwestern France.

== Population ==
Historical population
Year	Pop.	±% p.a.
1968	207	—
1975	188	−1.37%
1982	196	+0.60%
1990	203	+0.44%
1999	186	−0.97%
2007	243	+3.40%
2012	260	+1.36%
2017	232	−2.25%
2023	234	+0.14%
Source: INSEE

== See also ==
- Communes of the Haute-Garonne department
