= Le Cuing =

- Commune
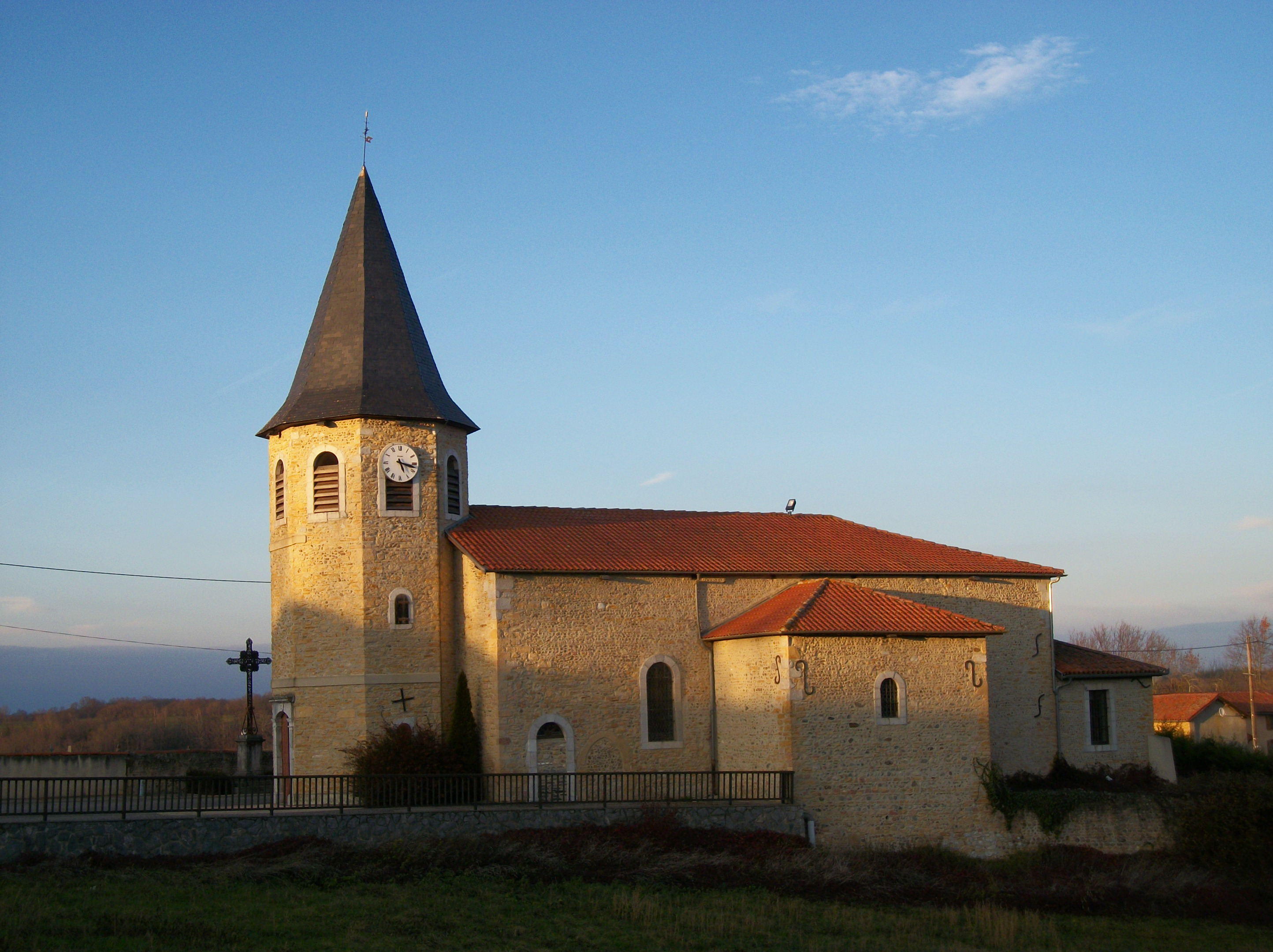
- The church in Le Cuing
- Location of Le Cuing
- Location within France Location within Occitanie
- Coordinates: 43°08′47″N 0°36′44″E
- Country: France
- Region: Occitania
- Department: Haute-Garonne
- Arrondissement: Saint-Gaudens
- Canton: Saint-Gaudens

Government
  - Mayor (2020–2026): David Dupuy
- Area^{1}: 13.05 km^{2} (5.04 sq mi)
- Elevation: 510 m (1,670 ft)
- Highest elevation: 517 m (1,696 ft)
- Lowest elevation: 412 m (1,352 ft)
- Population (2023): 482
  - Density: 36.9/km^{2} (95.7/sq mi)
- Time zone: UTC+01:00 (CET)
  - Summer (DST): UTC+02:00 (CEST)
- INSEE/Postal code: 31159 /31210
- ^{1} French Land Register data, which excludes lakes, ponds, glaciers > 1 km^{2} (0.386 sq mi or 247 acres) and river estuaries.

Le Cuing (French pronunciation: [lə kɥɛ̃]; Occitan: Eth Cunh) is a commune in the Haute-Garonne department in southwestern France.

== Population ==
Historical population
Year	Pop.	±% p.a.
1968	336	—
1975	342	+0.25%
1982	380	+1.52%
1990	374	−0.20%
1999	351	−0.70%
2007	392	+1.39%
2012	441	+2.38%
2017	465	+1.07%
2023	482	+0.60%
Source: INSEE

== See also ==
- Communes of the Haute-Garonne department
