= Ausson =

- Commune
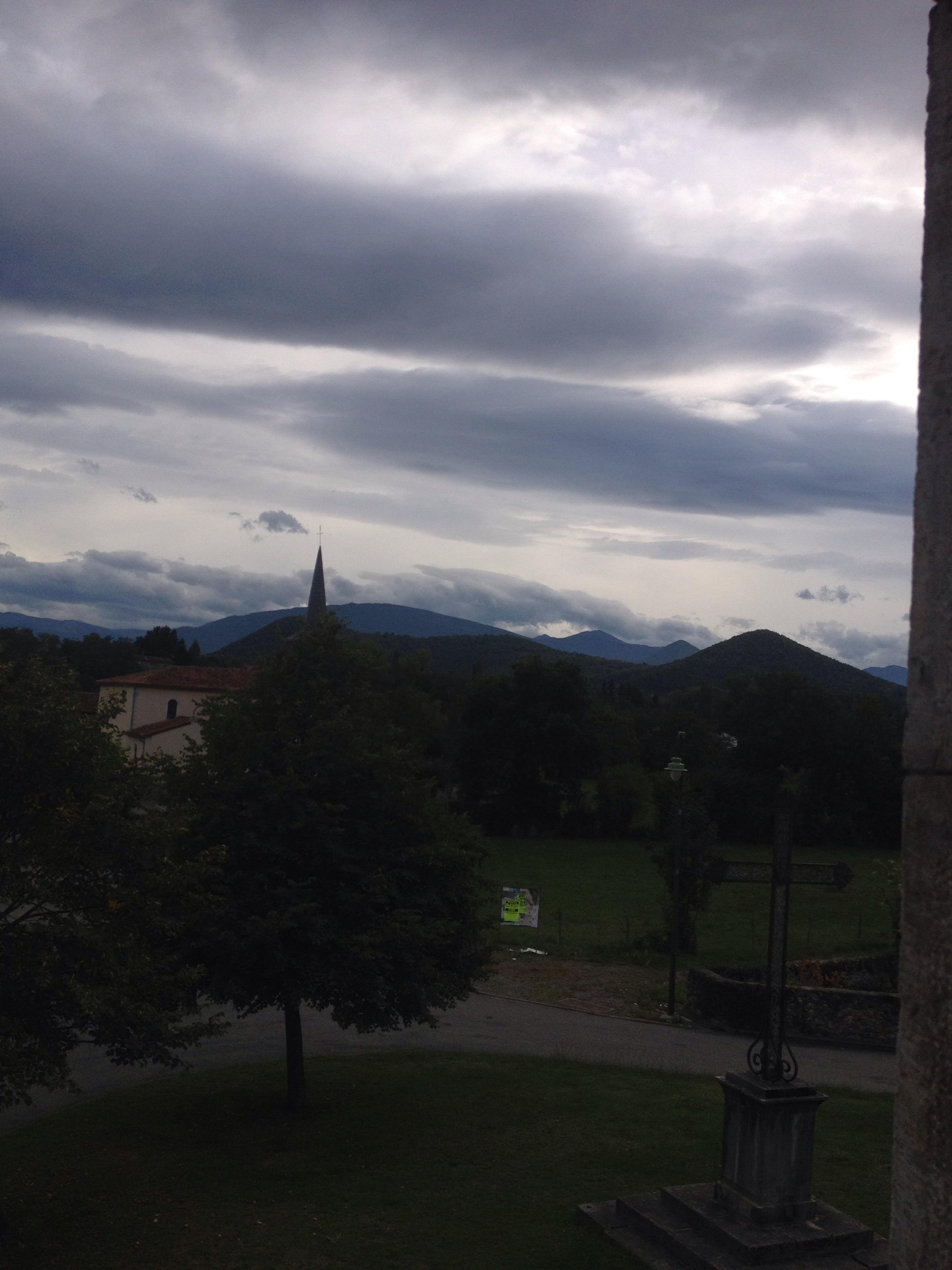
- A general view of Ausson

- Coat of arms
- Location of Ausson
- Location within France Location within Occitanie
- Coordinates: 43°04′56″N 0°35′47″E
- Country: France
- Region: Occitania
- Department: Haute-Garonne
- Arrondissement: Saint-Gaudens
- Canton: Saint-Gaudens
- Intercommunality: CC Cœur Coteaux Comminges

Government
  - Mayor (2020–2026): Yves-Pierre Barrau
- Area^{1}: 4.39 km^{2} (1.69 sq mi)
- Elevation: 400 m (1,300 ft)
- Highest elevation: 466 m (1,529 ft)
- Lowest elevation: 399 m (1,309 ft)
- Population (2023): 596
  - Density: 136/km^{2} (352/sq mi)
- Time zone: UTC+01:00 (CET)
  - Summer (DST): UTC+02:00 (CEST)
- INSEE/Postal code: 31031 /31210
- ^{1} French Land Register data, which excludes lakes, ponds, glaciers > 1 km^{2} (0.386 sq mi or 247 acres) and river estuaries.

Ausson (French pronunciation: [osɔ̃]) is a commune in the Haute-Garonne department in southwestern France.

== Population ==
Historical population
Year	Pop.	±% p.a.
1968	324	—
1975	462	+5.20%
1982	541	+2.28%
1990	547	+0.14%
1999	541	−0.12%
2007	553	+0.27%
2012	532	−0.77%
2017	586	+1.95%
2023	596	+0.28%
Source: INSEE

== See also ==
- Communes of the Haute-Garonne department
