= Lieoux =

- Commune
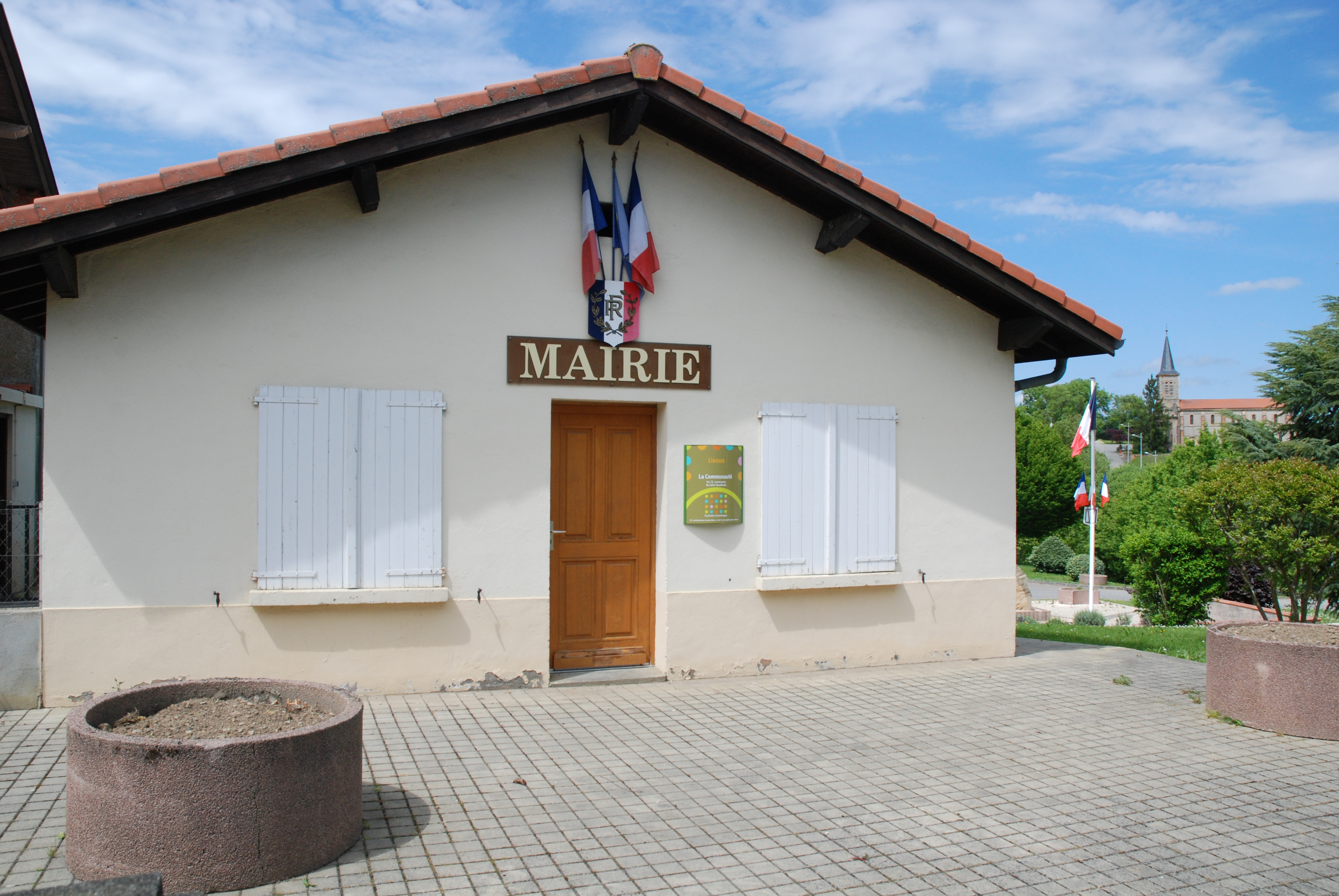
- The town hall in Lieoux
- Location of Lieoux
- Location within France Location within Occitanie
- Coordinates: 43°09′14″N 0°46′02″E
- Country: France
- Region: Occitania
- Department: Haute-Garonne
- Arrondissement: Saint-Gaudens
- Canton: Saint-Gaudens

Government
  - Mayor (2020–2026): Alain Barutaut
- Area^{1}: 5.85 km^{2} (2.26 sq mi)
- Highest elevation: 449 m (1,473 ft)
- Lowest elevation: 359 m (1,178 ft)
- Population (2023): 126
  - Density: 21.5/km^{2} (55.8/sq mi)
- Time zone: UTC+01:00 (CET)
  - Summer (DST): UTC+02:00 (CEST)
- INSEE/Postal code: 31300 /31800
- ^{1} French Land Register data, which excludes lakes, ponds, glaciers > 1 km^{2} (0.386 sq mi or 247 acres) and river estuaries.

Lieoux is a commune in the Haute-Garonne department in southwestern France.

Until the end of 1973 Lieoux was a commune in its own right, but on 1 January 1974 it was merged with the commune of Saint-Gaudens. It became a separate commune again on 13 February 2008.

== Population ==
Historical population
| Year | Pop. | ±% p.a. |
|---|---|---|
| 1968 | 110 | — |
| 1975 | 113 | +0.39% |
| 1982 | 127 | +1.68% |
| 1990 | 143 | +1.49% |
| 1999 | 126 | −1.40% |
| 2007 | 124 | −0.20% |
| 2012 | 130 | +0.95% |
| 2017 | 126 | −0.62% |
| 2023 | 126 | +0.00% |
Source: INSEE

Population data refer to the area corresponding with the commune as of January 2025.

== See also ==
- Communes of the Haute-Garonne department
