= Lécussan =

- Commune
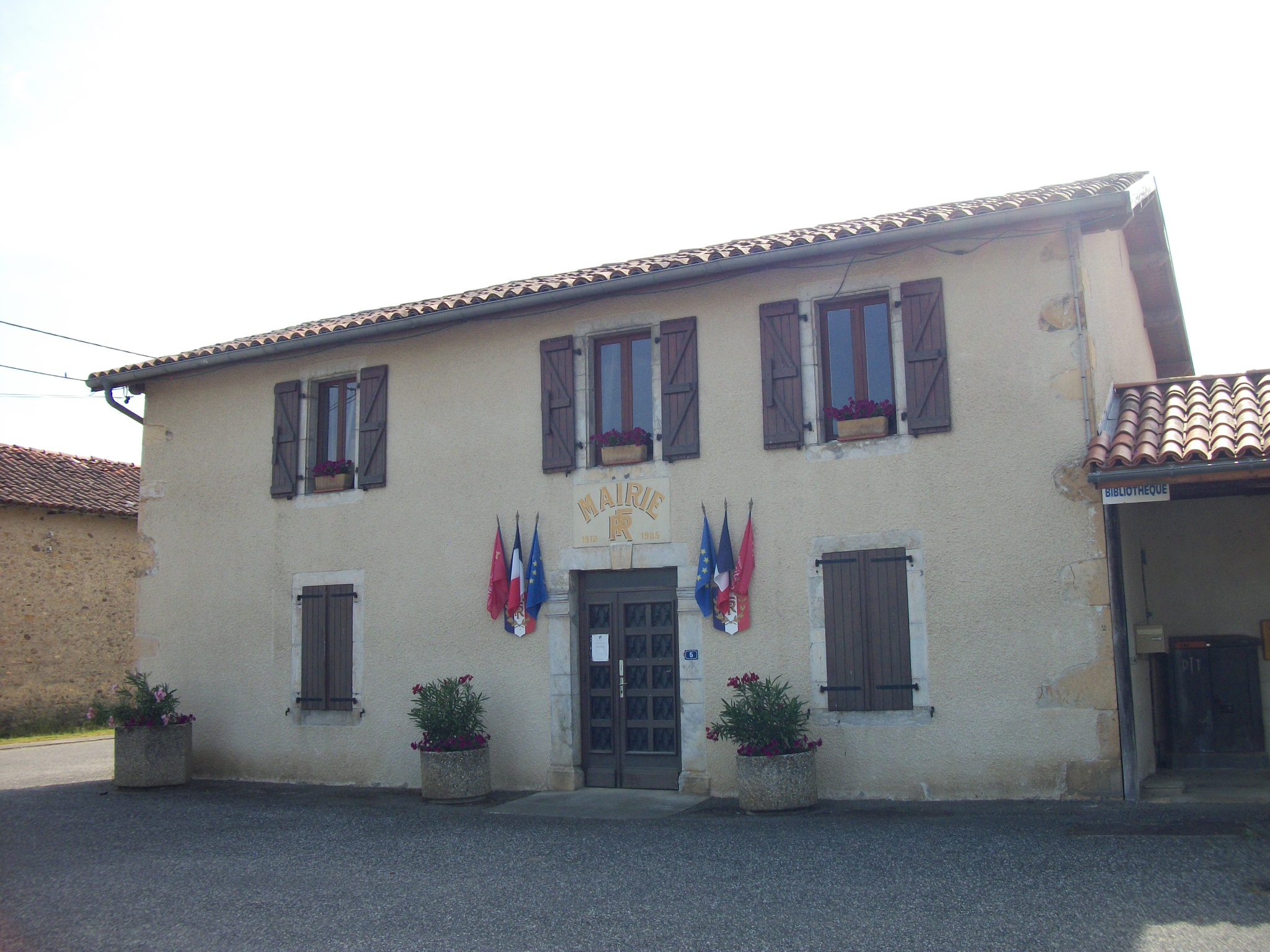
- Town hall

- Coat of arms
- Location of Lécussan
- Location within France Location within Occitanie
- Coordinates: 43°09′42″N 0°30′05″E
- Country: France
- Region: Occitania
- Department: Haute-Garonne
- Arrondissement: Saint-Gaudens
- Canton: Saint-Gaudens

Government
  - Mayor (2020–2026): Bernard Malet
- Area^{1}: 7.43 km^{2} (2.87 sq mi)
- Elevation: 541 m (1,775 ft)
- Highest elevation: 581 m (1,906 ft)
- Lowest elevation: 413 m (1,355 ft)
- Population (2023): 248
  - Density: 33.4/km^{2} (86.4/sq mi)
- Time zone: UTC+01:00 (CET)
  - Summer (DST): UTC+02:00 (CEST)
- INSEE/Postal code: 31289 /31580
- ^{1} French Land Register data, which excludes lakes, ponds, glaciers > 1 km^{2} (0.386 sq mi or 247 acres) and river estuaries.

Lécussan (French pronunciation: [lekysɑ̃]; Occitan: Lecuçan) is a commune in the Haute-Garonne department in southwestern France.

== Population ==
Historical population
Year	Pop.	±% p.a.
1968	230	—
1975	243	+0.79%
1982	221	−1.35%
1990	217	−0.23%
1999	206	−0.58%
2007	293	+4.50%
2012	245	−3.52%
2017	268	+1.81%
2023	248	−1.28%
Source: INSEE

== See also ==
- Communes of the Haute-Garonne department
