= Mondilhan =

- Commune
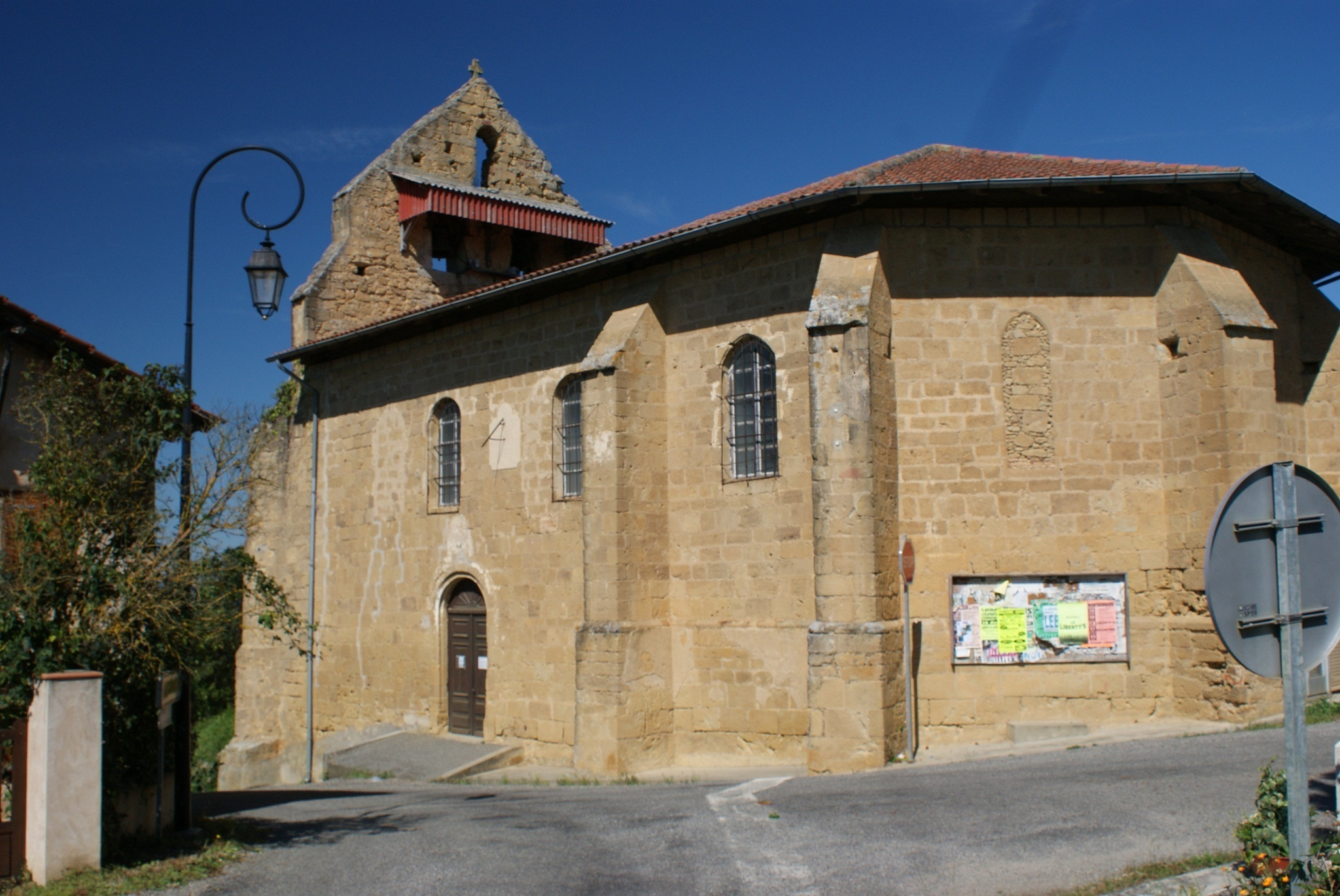
- The church in Mondilhan
- Location of Mondilhan
- Location within France Location within Occitanie
- Coordinates: 43°17′42″N 0°42′33″E
- Country: France
- Region: Occitania
- Department: Haute-Garonne
- Arrondissement: Saint-Gaudens
- Canton: Saint-Gaudens

Government
  - Mayor (2020–2026): Joseph Gaspard
- Area^{1}: 10.02 km^{2} (3.87 sq mi)
- Elevation: 395 m (1,296 ft)
- Highest elevation: 390 m (1,280 ft)
- Lowest elevation: 244 m (801 ft)
- Population (2023): 88
  - Density: 8.8/km^{2} (23/sq mi)
- Time zone: UTC+01:00 (CET)
  - Summer (DST): UTC+02:00 (CEST)
- INSEE/Postal code: 31350 /31350
- ^{1} French Land Register data, which excludes lakes, ponds, glaciers > 1 km^{2} (0.386 sq mi or 247 acres) and river estuaries.

Mondilhan is a commune in the Haute-Garonne department in southwestern France.

== Population ==
Historical population
Year	Pop.	±% p.a.
1968	173	—
1975	139	−3.08%
1982	123	−1.73%
1990	107	−1.73%
1999	80	−3.18%
2007	93	+1.90%
2012	94	+0.21%
2017	92	−0.43%
2023	88	−0.74%
Source: INSEE

== See also ==
- Communes of the Haute-Garonne department
