= Franquevielle =

- Commune
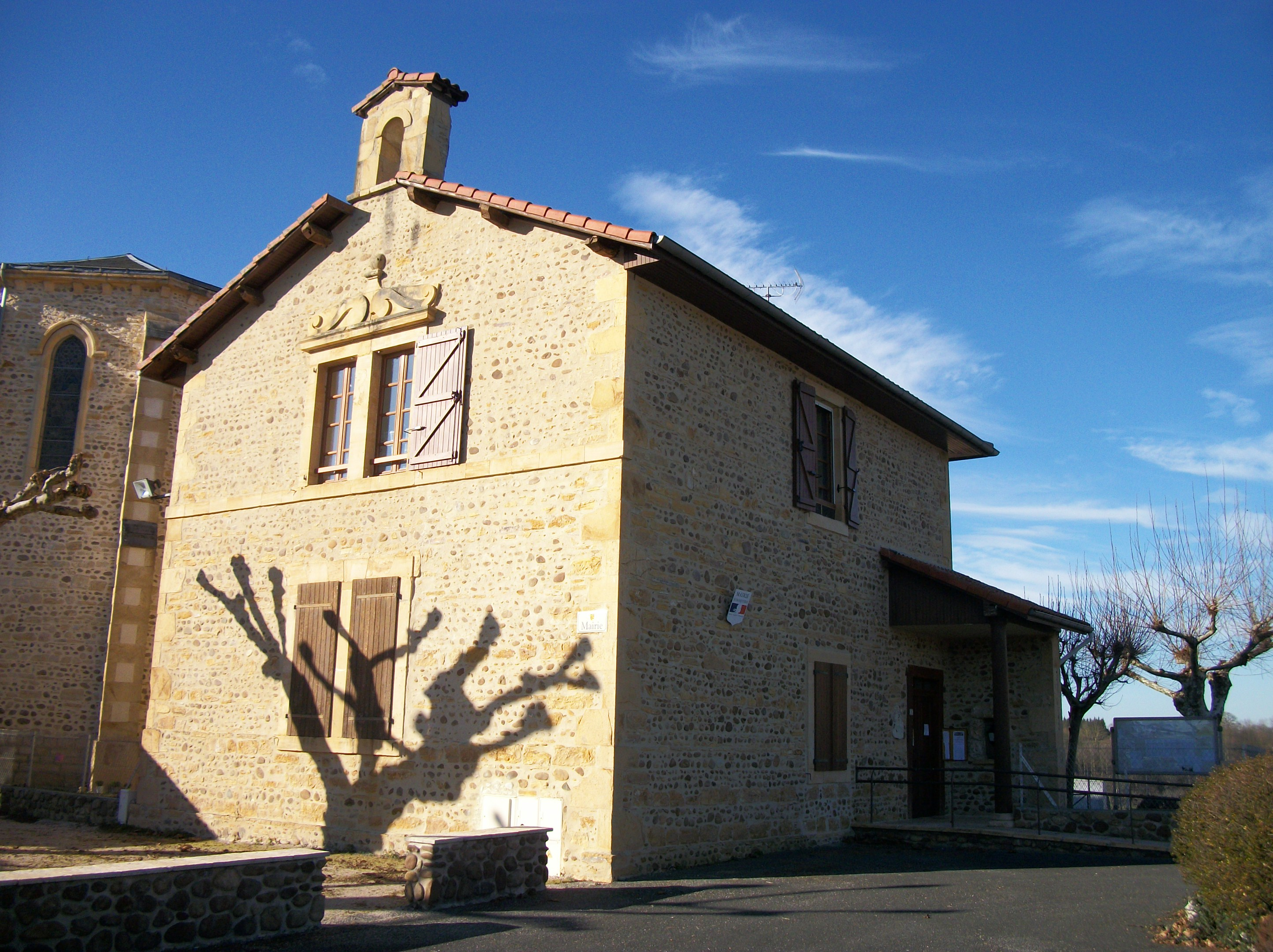
- The town hall in Franquevielle
- Location of Franquevielle
- Location within France Location within Occitanie
- Coordinates: 43°08′15″N 0°32′02″E
- Country: France
- Region: Occitania
- Department: Haute-Garonne
- Arrondissement: Saint-Gaudens
- Canton: Saint-Gaudens

Government
  - Mayor (2020–2026): Virginie Nicolas
- Area^{1}: 10.88 km^{2} (4.20 sq mi)
- Elevation: 500 m (1,600 ft)
- Highest elevation: 565 m (1,854 ft)
- Lowest elevation: 437 m (1,434 ft)
- Population (2023): 339
  - Density: 31.2/km^{2} (80.7/sq mi)
- Time zone: UTC+01:00 (CET)
  - Summer (DST): UTC+02:00 (CEST)
- INSEE/Postal code: 31197 /31210
- ^{1} French Land Register data, which excludes lakes, ponds, glaciers > 1 km^{2} (0.386 sq mi or 247 acres) and river estuaries.

Franquevielle (French pronunciation: [fʁɑ̃kvjɛl]; Occitan: Francavièla) is a commune in the Haute-Garonne department in southwestern France.

== Population ==
Historical population
Year	Pop.	±% p.a.
1968	403	—
1975	362	−1.52%
1982	379	+0.66%
1990	349	−1.03%
1999	333	−0.52%
2007	351	+0.66%
2012	348	−0.17%
2017	332	−0.94%
2023	339	+0.35%
Source: INSEE

== See also ==
- Communes of the Haute-Garonne department
