= Sarrecave =

- Commune
- Coat of arms
- Location of Sarrecave
- Location within France Location within Occitanie
- Coordinates: 43°12′57″N 0°35′48″E
- Country: France
- Region: Occitania
- Department: Haute-Garonne
- Arrondissement: Saint-Gaudens
- Canton: Saint-Gaudens

Government
  - Mayor (2020–2026): Évelyne Boubée
- Area^{1}: 2.49 km^{2} (0.96 sq mi)
- Elevation: 417 m (1,368 ft)
- Highest elevation: 470 m (1,540 ft)
- Lowest elevation: 339 m (1,112 ft)
- Population (2023): 69
  - Density: 28/km^{2} (72/sq mi)
- Time zone: UTC+01:00 (CET)
  - Summer (DST): UTC+02:00 (CEST)
- INSEE/Postal code: 31531 /31350
- ^{1} French Land Register data, which excludes lakes, ponds, glaciers > 1 km^{2} (0.386 sq mi or 247 acres) and river estuaries.

Sarrecave (French pronunciation: [saʁkav]; Occitan: Sarracauva) is a commune in the Haute-Garonne department of southwestern France.

== Population ==
Historical population
Year	Pop.	±% p.a.
1968	86	—
1975	63	−4.35%
1982	57	−1.42%
1990	59	+0.43%
1999	61	+0.37%
2007	78	+3.12%
2012	73	−1.32%
2017	78	+1.33%
2023	69	−2.02%
Source: INSEE

== See also ==
- Communes of the Haute-Garonne department
