= Castéra-Vignoles =

- Commune
- Coat of arms
- Location of Castéra-Vignoles
- Location within France Location within Occitanie
- Coordinates: 43°16′29″N 0°46′47″E
- Country: France
- Region: Occitania
- Department: Haute-Garonne
- Arrondissement: Saint-Gaudens
- Canton: Saint-Gaudens

Government
  - Mayor (2020–2026): Thierry Pouzol
- Area^{1}: 4.19 km^{2} (1.62 sq mi)
- Elevation: 408 m (1,339 ft)
- Highest elevation: 376 m (1,234 ft)
- Lowest elevation: 254 m (833 ft)
- Population (2023): 64
  - Density: 15/km^{2} (40/sq mi)
- Time zone: UTC+01:00 (CET)
  - Summer (DST): UTC+02:00 (CEST)
- INSEE/Postal code: 31121 /31350
- ^{1} French Land Register data, which excludes lakes, ponds, glaciers > 1 km^{2} (0.386 sq mi or 247 acres) and river estuaries.

Castéra-Vignoles (French pronunciation: [kasteʁa viɲɔl]; Occitan: Casterar e Vinhòlas) is a commune in the Haute-Garonne department in southwestern France.

== Population ==
Historical population
Year	Pop.	±% p.a.
1968	65	—
1975	65	+0.00%
1982	69	+0.86%
1990	67	−0.37%
1999	54	−2.37%
2007	59	+1.11%
2012	65	+1.96%
2017	64	−0.31%
2023	64	+0.00%
Source: INSEE

== See also ==
- Communes of the Haute-Garonne department
