= Saint-Pé-Delbosc =

- Commune
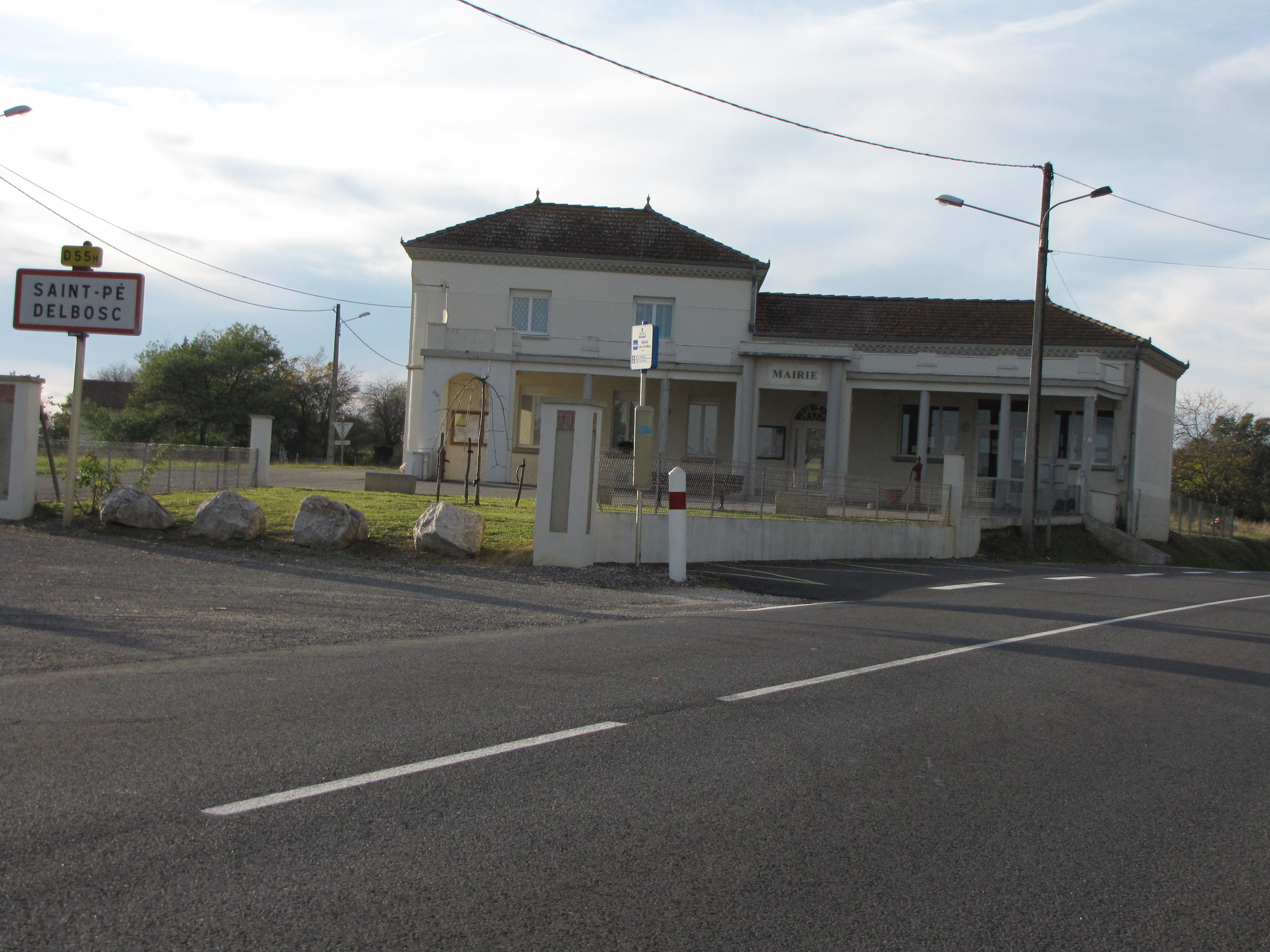
- Town hall
- Location of Saint-Pé-Delbosc
- Location within France Location within Occitanie
- Coordinates: 43°16′14″N 0°41′50″E
- Country: France
- Region: Occitania
- Department: Haute-Garonne
- Arrondissement: Saint-Gaudens
- Canton: Saint-Gaudens

Government
  - Mayor (2020–2026): Jean-Pierre Fortassin
- Area^{1}: 5.51 km^{2} (2.13 sq mi)
- Elevation: 310 m (1,020 ft)
- Highest elevation: 347 m (1,138 ft)
- Lowest elevation: 255 m (837 ft)
- Population (2023): 142
  - Density: 25.8/km^{2} (66.7/sq mi)
- Time zone: UTC+01:00 (CET)
  - Summer (DST): UTC+02:00 (CEST)
- INSEE/Postal code: 31510 /31350
- ^{1} French Land Register data, which excludes lakes, ponds, glaciers > 1 km^{2} (0.386 sq mi or 247 acres) and river estuaries.

Saint-Pé-Delbosc (French pronunciation: [sɛ̃ pe dɛlbɔsk]; Occitan: Sent Pèr deth Bòsc) is a commune in the Haute-Garonne department in southwestern France.

== Population ==
Historical population
Year	Pop.	±% p.a.
1968	149	—
1975	147	−0.19%
1982	135	−1.21%
1990	132	−0.28%
1999	121	−0.96%
2007	125	+0.41%
2012	130	+0.79%
2017	134	+0.61%
2023	142	+0.97%
Source: INSEE

== See also ==
- Communes of the Haute-Garonne department
