= Clarac, Haute-Garonne =

Clarac
- Commune
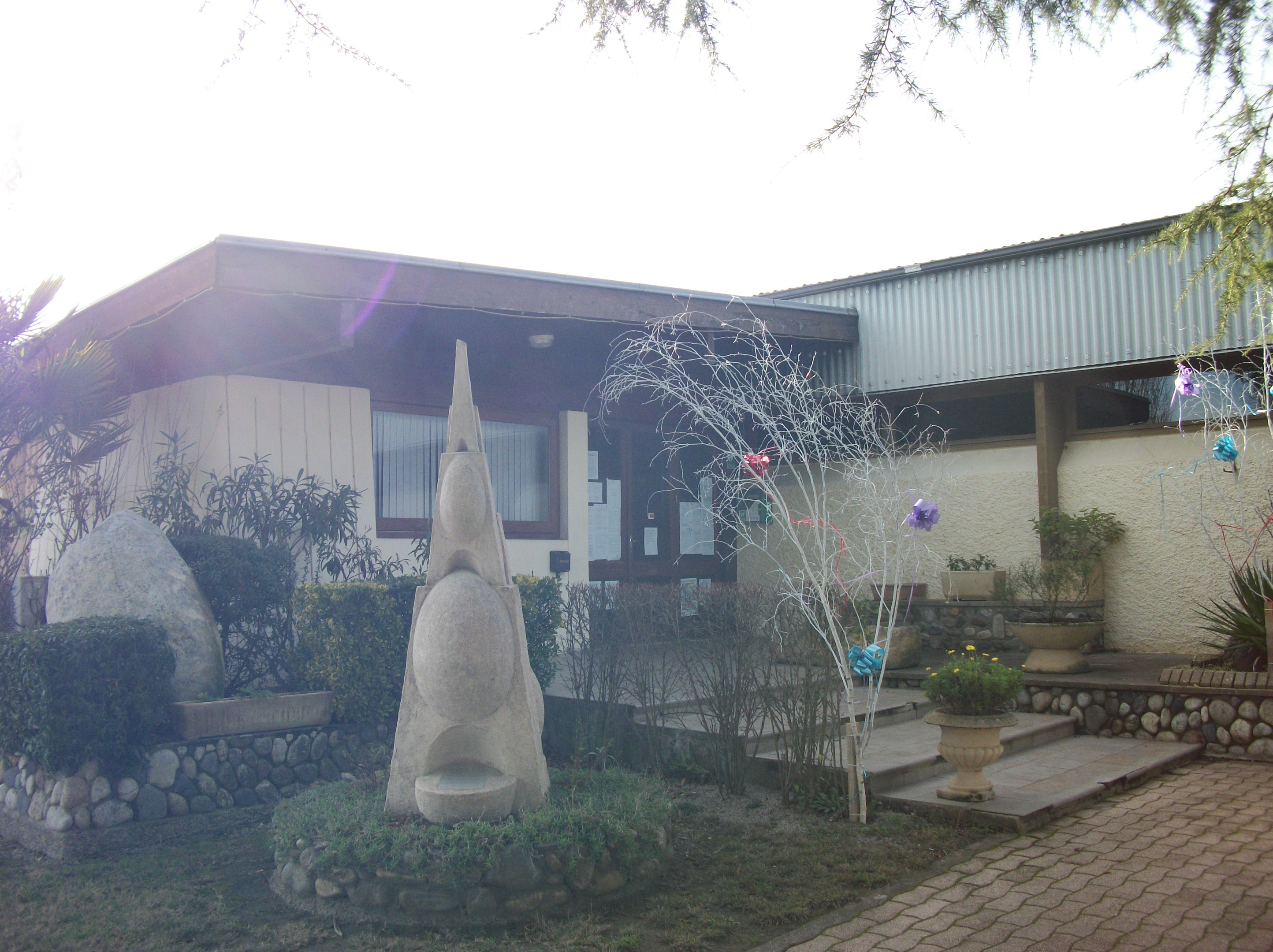
- The town hall in Clarac
- Location of Clarac
- Location within France Location within Occitanie
- Coordinates: 43°05′50″N 0°37′36″E
- Country: France
- Region: Occitania
- Department: Haute-Garonne
- Arrondissement: Saint-Gaudens
- Canton: Saint-Gaudens

Government
  - Mayor (2020–2026): Jean-Paul Manent
- Area^{1}: 4.74 km^{2} (1.83 sq mi)
- Elevation: 300 m (980 ft)
- Highest elevation: 515 m (1,690 ft)
- Lowest elevation: 387 m (1,270 ft)
- Population (2023): 672
  - Density: 142/km^{2} (367/sq mi)
- Time zone: UTC+01:00 (CET)
  - Summer (DST): UTC+02:00 (CEST)
- INSEE/Postal code: 31147 /31210
- ^{1} French Land Register data, which excludes lakes, ponds, glaciers > 1 km^{2} (0.386 sq mi or 247 acres) and river estuaries.

Clarac (French pronunciation: [klaʁak]) is a commune in the Haute-Garonne department in southwestern France.

== Geography ==
=== Climate ===
Clarac has an Oceanic climate (Köppen climate classification Cfb). The average annual temperature in Clarac is 12.5 °C (54.5 °F). The average annual rainfall is 804.9 mm (31.69 in) with May as the wettest month. The temperatures are highest on average in August, at around 20.4 °C (68.7 °F), and lowest in January, at around 5.2 °C (41.4 °F). The highest temperature ever recorded in Clarac was 39.4 °C (102.9 °F) on 13 August 2003; the coldest temperature ever recorded was −12.5 °C (9.5 °F) on 10 January 2010.

Climate data for Clarac (1991−2020 normals, extremes 1994−present)
Month	Jan	Feb	Mar	Apr	May	Jun	Jul	Aug	Sep	Oct	Nov	Dec	Year
Record high °C (°F)	22.8 (73.0)	24.4 (75.9)	26.5 (79.7)	29.0 (84.2)	31.4 (88.5)	37.3 (99.1)	39.3 (102.7)	39.4 (102.9)	34.6 (94.3)	31.7 (89.1)	26.1 (79.0)	23.4 (74.1)	39.4 (102.9)
Mean daily maximum °C (°F)	10.3 (50.5)	11.5 (52.7)	14.6 (58.3)	16.9 (62.4)	20.0 (68.0)	23.7 (74.7)	26.0 (78.8)	26.3 (79.3)	23.4 (74.1)	19.7 (67.5)	13.7 (56.7)	11.1 (52.0)	18.1 (64.6)
Daily mean °C (°F)	5.2 (41.4)	6.0 (42.8)	8.6 (47.5)	11.1 (52.0)	14.5 (58.1)	18.2 (64.8)	20.4 (68.7)	20.4 (68.7)	17.3 (63.1)	13.8 (56.8)	8.4 (47.1)	5.8 (42.4)	12.5 (54.5)
Mean daily minimum °C (°F)	0.1 (32.2)	0.6 (33.1)	2.7 (36.9)	5.3 (41.5)	9.0 (48.2)	12.7 (54.9)	14.7 (58.5)	14.5 (58.1)	11.2 (52.2)	7.9 (46.2)	3.1 (37.6)	0.6 (33.1)	6.9 (44.4)
Record low °C (°F)	−12.3 (9.9)	−11.6 (11.1)	−9.5 (14.9)	−3.5 (25.7)	−0.9 (30.4)	1.7 (35.1)	6.0 (42.8)	4.8 (40.6)	1.3 (34.3)	−3.6 (25.5)	−8.8 (16.2)	−12.5 (9.5)	−12.5 (9.5)
Average precipitation mm (inches)	77.1 (3.04)	59.8 (2.35)	69.1 (2.72)	81.3 (3.20)	91.2 (3.59)	61.0 (2.40)	54.4 (2.14)	49.1 (1.93)	53.5 (2.11)	55.5 (2.19)	86.7 (3.41)	66.2 (2.61)	804.9 (31.69)
Average precipitation days (≥ 1.0 mm)	10.4	9.1	10.3	11.0	11.2	8.0	6.6	7.6	7.7	8.7	11.0	9.7	111.3
Source: Météo-France

== Population ==
Historical population
Year	Pop.	±% p.a.
1968	167	—
1975	189	+1.78%
1982	255	+4.37%
1990	452	+7.42%
1999	508	+1.31%
2007	560	+1.23%
2012	572	+0.42%
2017	630	+1.95%
2023	672	+1.08%
Source: INSEE

== See also ==
- Communes of the Haute-Garonne department
