= Bordes-de-Rivière =

- Commune
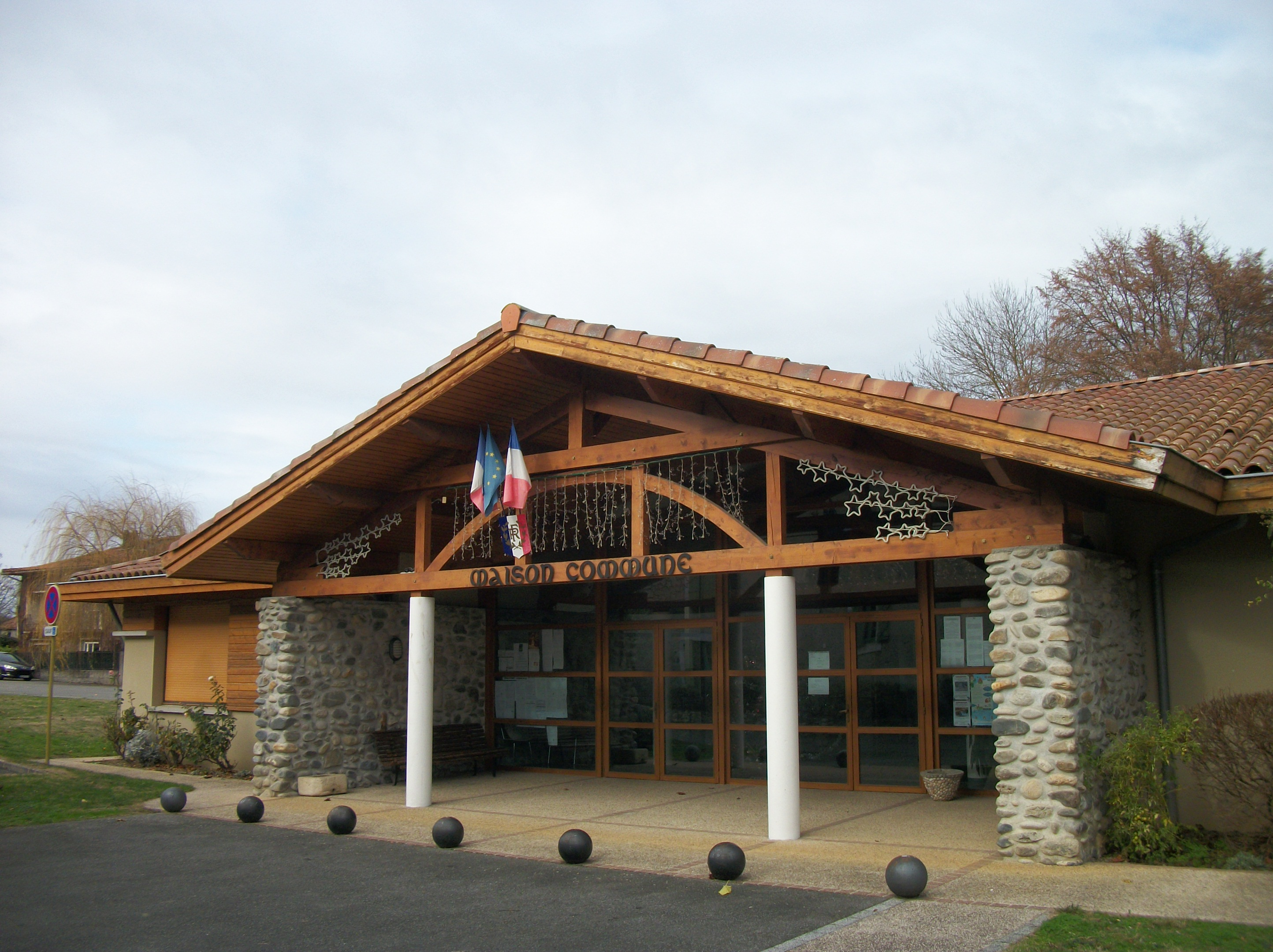
- The town hall in Bordes-de-Rivière
- Location of Bordes-de-Rivière
- Location within France Location within Occitanie
- Coordinates: 43°06′28″N 0°38′03″E
- Country: France
- Region: Occitania
- Department: Haute-Garonne
- Arrondissement: Saint-Gaudens
- Canton: Saint-Gaudens

Government
  - Mayor (2020–2026): Geneviève Caperan
- Area^{1}: 8.52 km^{2} (3.29 sq mi)
- Elevation: 300 m (980 ft)
- Highest elevation: 516 m (1,693 ft)
- Lowest elevation: 379 m (1,243 ft)
- Population (2023): 461
  - Density: 54.1/km^{2} (140/sq mi)
- Time zone: UTC+01:00 (CET)
  - Summer (DST): UTC+02:00 (CEST)
- INSEE/Postal code: 31076 /31210
- ^{1} French Land Register data, which excludes lakes, ponds, glaciers > 1 km^{2} (0.386 sq mi or 247 acres) and river estuaries.

Bordes-de-Rivière (French pronunciation: [bɔʁd də ʁivjɛʁ]; Occitan: Eras Bòrdas d'Arribèra) is a commune of the Haute-Garonne department in southwestern France.

== Population ==
Historical population
Year	Pop.	±% p.a.
1968	309	—
1975	312	+0.14%
1982	339	+1.19%
1990	388	+1.70%
1999	359	−0.86%
2007	440	+2.58%
2012	504	+2.75%
2017	483	−0.85%
2023	461	−0.77%
Source: INSEE

== See also ==
- Communes of the Haute-Garonne department
