= Saint-Ignan =

- Commune
- Location of Saint-Ignan
- Location within France Location within Occitanie
- Coordinates: 43°09′37″N 0°41′41″E
- Country: France
- Region: Occitania
- Department: Haute-Garonne
- Arrondissement: Saint-Gaudens
- Canton: Saint-Gaudens

Government
  - Mayor (2020–2026): Elisabeth Rouede-Plante
- Area^{1}: 5.35 km^{2} (2.07 sq mi)
- Elevation: 420 m (1,380 ft)
- Highest elevation: 484 m (1,588 ft)
- Lowest elevation: 377 m (1,237 ft)
- Population (2023): 218
  - Density: 40.7/km^{2} (106/sq mi)
- Time zone: UTC+01:00 (CET)
  - Summer (DST): UTC+02:00 (CEST)
- INSEE/Postal code: 31487 /31800
- ^{1} French Land Register data, which excludes lakes, ponds, glaciers > 1 km^{2} (0.386 sq mi or 247 acres) and river estuaries.

Saint-Ignan (French pronunciation: [sɛ̃.t‿iɲɑ̃]; Occitan: Sent Inhan) is a commune in the Haute-Garonne department in southwestern France.

== Population ==
Historical population
Year	Pop.	±% p.a.
1968	236	—
1975	208	−1.79%
1982	220	+0.80%
1990	198	−1.31%
1999	250	+2.62%
2007	255	+0.25%
2012	247	−0.64%
2017	226	−1.76%
2023	218	−0.60%
Source: INSEE

== See also ==
- Communes of the Haute-Garonne department
