= Les Tourreilles =

- Commune
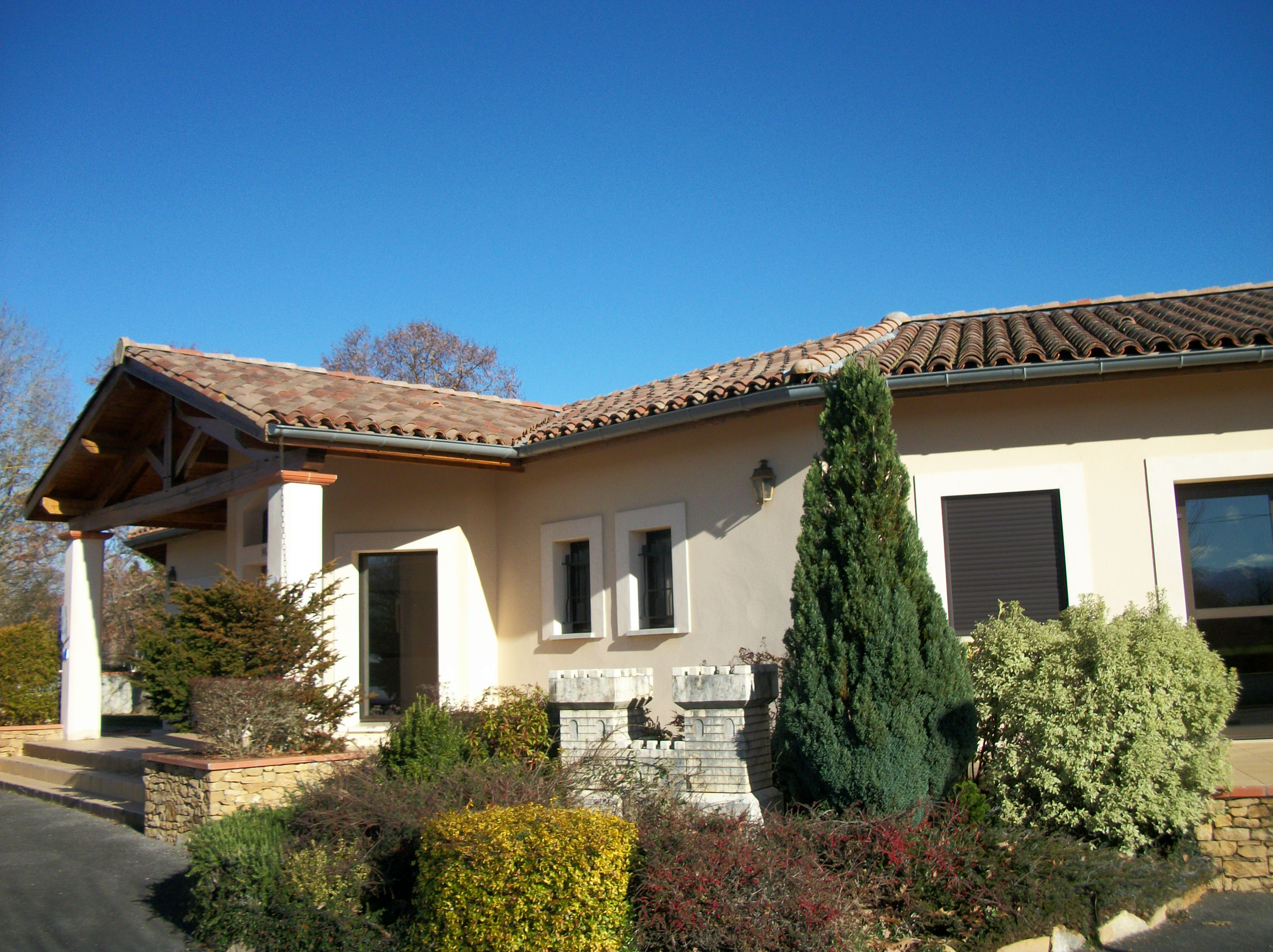
- The town hall in Les Tourreilles
- Location of Les Tourreilles
- Location within France Location within Occitanie
- Coordinates: 43°06′49″N 0°33′10″E
- Country: France
- Region: Occitania
- Department: Haute-Garonne
- Arrondissement: Saint-Gaudens
- Canton: Saint-Gaudens

Government
  - Mayor (2020–2026): Denis Sarraquigne
- Area^{1}: 12.33 km^{2} (4.76 sq mi)
- Elevation: 547 m (1,795 ft)
- Highest elevation: 553 m (1,814 ft)
- Lowest elevation: 413 m (1,355 ft)
- Population (2023): 376
  - Density: 30.5/km^{2} (79.0/sq mi)
- Time zone: UTC+01:00 (CET)
  - Summer (DST): UTC+02:00 (CEST)
- INSEE/Postal code: 31556 /31210
- ^{1} French Land Register data, which excludes lakes, ponds, glaciers > 1 km^{2} (0.386 sq mi or 247 acres) and river estuaries.

Les Tourreilles (French pronunciation: [le tuʁɛj]; Occitan: Eras Torrelhas) is a commune in the Haute-Garonne department in southwestern France.

== Population ==
Historical population
Year	Pop.	±% p.a.
1968	291	—
1975	305	+0.67%
1982	283	−1.06%
1990	305	+0.94%
1999	358	+1.80%
2007	381	+0.78%
2012	380	−0.05%
2017	384	+0.21%
2023	376	−0.35%
Source: INSEE

== See also ==
- Communes of the Haute-Garonne department
