= Cazaril-Tambourès =

- Commune
- Coat of arms
- Location of Cazaril-Tambourès
- Location within France Location within Occitanie
- Coordinates: 43°11′09″N 0°32′46″E
- Country: France
- Region: Occitania
- Department: Haute-Garonne
- Arrondissement: Saint-Gaudens
- Canton: Saint-Gaudens

Government
  - Mayor (2020–2026): Gérard Lefranc
- Area^{1}: 6.93 km^{2} (2.68 sq mi)
- Elevation: 430 m (1,410 ft)
- Highest elevation: 525 m (1,722 ft)
- Lowest elevation: 378 m (1,240 ft)
- Population (2023): 89
  - Density: 13/km^{2} (33/sq mi)
- Time zone: UTC+01:00 (CET)
  - Summer (DST): UTC+02:00 (CEST)
- INSEE/Postal code: 31130 /31580
- ^{1} French Land Register data, which excludes lakes, ponds, glaciers > 1 km^{2} (0.386 sq mi or 247 acres) and river estuaries.

Cazaril-Tambourès (Occitan: Tambors) is a village and a commune in the Haute-Garonne department in southwestern France. The commune had in 2013 census, a population of 87. At the 2019 census the population remained less than 100, with 84 people.

== Population ==
Historical population
Year	Pop.	±% p.a.
1968	130	—
1975	98	−3.96%
1982	114	+2.18%
1990	104	−1.14%
1999	99	−0.55%
2007	81	−2.48%
2012	82	+0.25%
2017	88	+1.42%
2023	89	+0.19%
Source: INSEE

== See also ==
- Communes of the Haute-Garonne department
