= Charlas =

- Commune
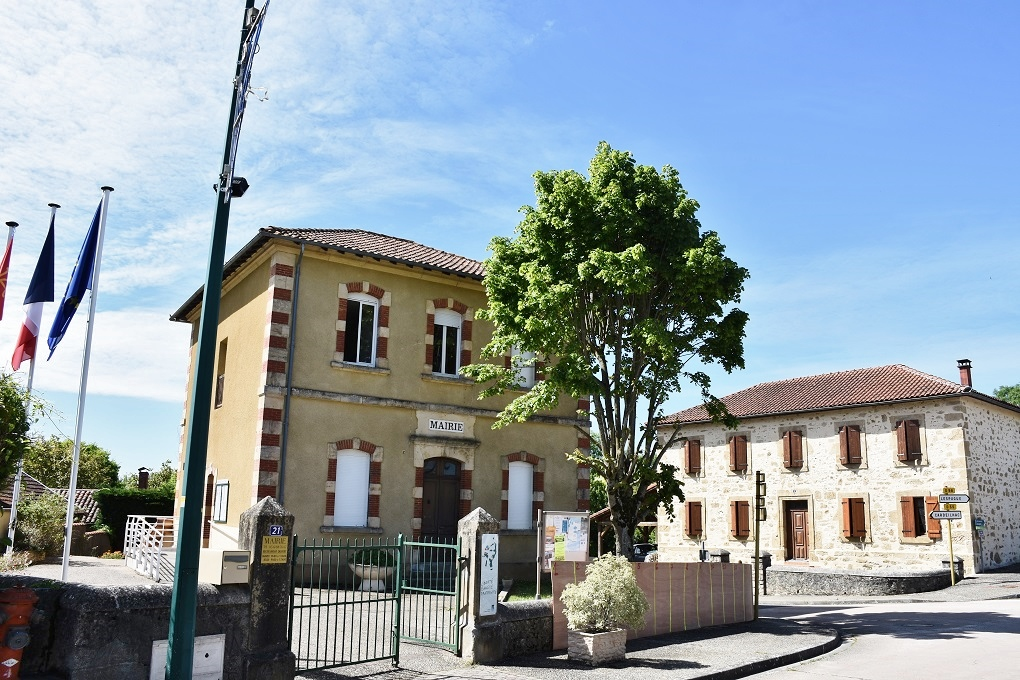
- Charlas Town Hall

- Coat of arms
- Location of Charlas
- Location within France Location within Occitanie
- Coordinates: 43°13′40″N 0°41′39″E
- Country: France
- Region: Occitania
- Department: Haute-Garonne
- Arrondissement: Saint-Gaudens
- Canton: Saint-Gaudens

Government
  - Mayor (2020–2026): Jean-Pierre Duclos
- Area^{1}: 11.32 km^{2} (4.37 sq mi)
- Elevation: 345 m (1,132 ft)
- Highest elevation: 447 m (1,467 ft)
- Lowest elevation: 267 m (876 ft)
- Population (2023): 243
  - Density: 21.5/km^{2} (55.6/sq mi)
- Time zone: UTC+01:00 (CET)
  - Summer (DST): UTC+02:00 (CEST)
- INSEE/Postal code: 31138 /31350
- ^{1} French Land Register data, which excludes lakes, ponds, glaciers > 1 km^{2} (0.386 sq mi or 247 acres) and river estuaries.

Charlas is a commune in the Haute-Garonne department in southwestern France.

== Population ==
Historical population
| Year | Pop. | ±% p.a. |
|---|---|---|
| 1968 | 249 | — |
| 1975 | 222 | −1.63% |
| 1982 | 221 | −0.06% |
| 1990 | 196 | −1.49% |
| 1999 | 189 | −0.40% |
| 2007 | 211 | +1.39% |
| 2012 | 225 | +1.29% |
| 2017 | 242 | +1.47% |
| 2023 | 243 | +0.07% |
Source: INSEE

== See also ==
- Communes of the Haute-Garonne department
