= Savarthès =

- Commune
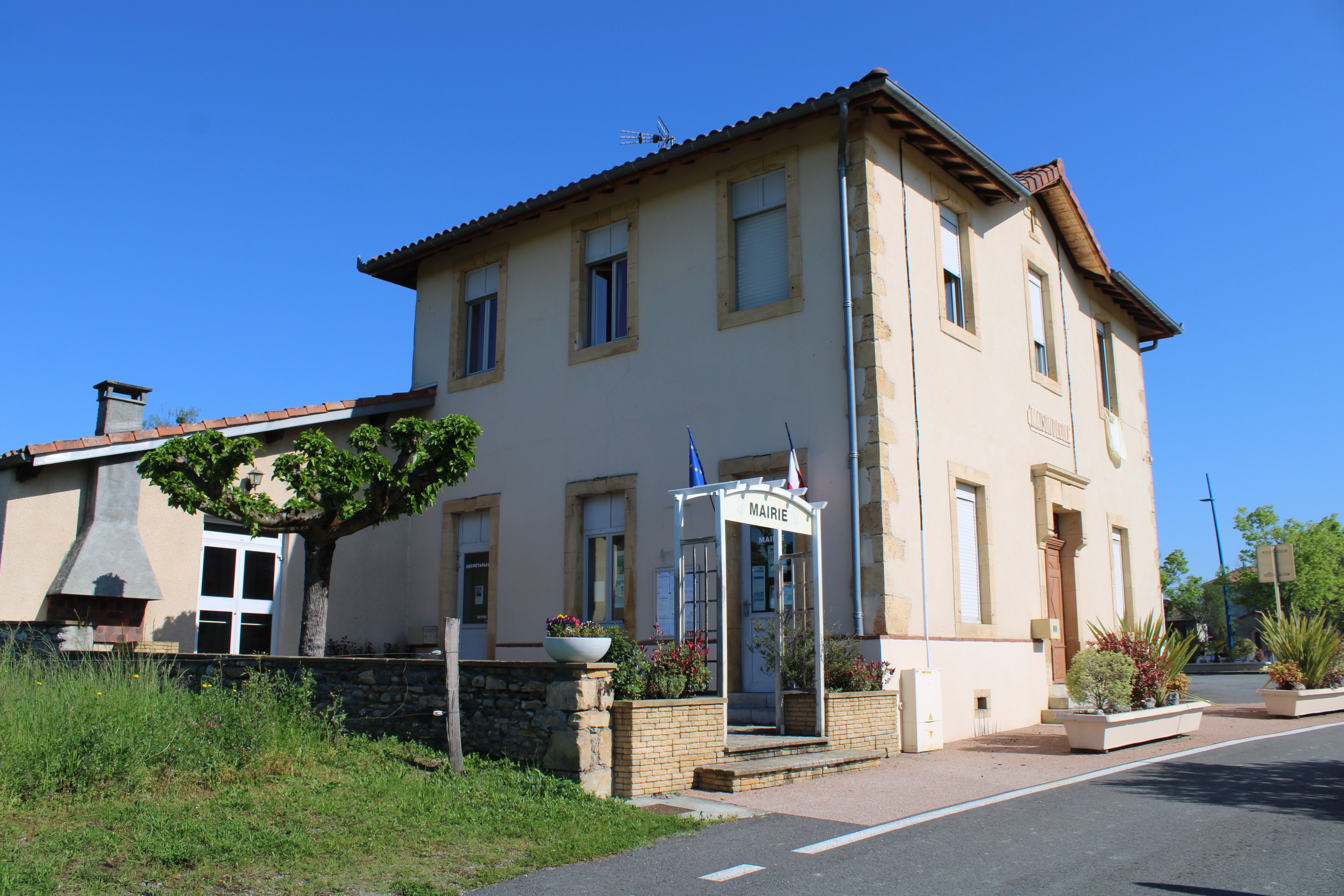
- Savarthès Town hall
- Location of Savarthès
- Location within France Location within Occitanie
- Coordinates: 43°07′18″N 0°48′25″E
- Country: France
- Region: Occitania
- Department: Haute-Garonne
- Arrondissement: Saint-Gaudens
- Canton: Saint-Gaudens

Government
  - Mayor (2020–2026): Martine Gilly
- Area^{1}: 3.05 km^{2} (1.18 sq mi)
- Elevation: 370 m (1,210 ft)
- Highest elevation: 440 m (1,440 ft)
- Lowest elevation: 337 m (1,106 ft)
- Population (2023): 195
  - Density: 63.9/km^{2} (166/sq mi)
- Time zone: UTC+01:00 (CET)
  - Summer (DST): UTC+02:00 (CEST)
- INSEE/Postal code: 31537 /31800
- ^{1} French Land Register data, which excludes lakes, ponds, glaciers > 1 km^{2} (0.386 sq mi or 247 acres) and river estuaries.

Savarthès (French pronunciation: [savaʁtɛs]; Occitan: Eth Savartés) is a commune in the Haute-Garonne department in southwestern France.

== Population ==
Historical population
Year	Pop.	±% p.a.
1968	117	—
1975	99	−2.36%
1982	98	−0.14%
1990	105	+0.87%
1999	122	+1.68%
2007	141	+1.83%
2012	170	+3.81%
2017	173	+0.35%
2023	195	+2.02%
Source: INSEE

== See also ==
- Communes of the Haute-Garonne department
