= Canton of Saint-Gaudens =

French canton founded in March of 2015

Coordinates: 43.11°N 0.72°E

The canton of Saint-Gaudens is an administrative division of the Haute-Garonne department, southern France. Its borders were modified at the French canton reorganisation which came into effect in March 2015. Its seat is in Saint-Gaudens.

It consists of the following communes:

1. Aspret-Sarrat
2. Ausson
3. Balesta
4. Blajan
5. Bordes-de-Rivière
6. Boudrac
7. Boulogne-sur-Gesse
8. Cardeilhac
9. Castéra-Vignoles
10. Cazaril-Tambourès
11. Charlas
12. Ciadoux
13. Clarac
14. Cuguron
15. Le Cuing
16. Escanecrabe
17. Estancarbon
18. Franquevielle
19. Gensac-de-Boulogne
20. Labarthe-Inard
21. Labarthe-Rivière
22. Lalouret-Laffiteau
23. Landorthe
24. Larcan
25. Larroque
26. Lécussan
27. Lespiteau
28. Lespugue
29. Lieoux
30. Lodes
31. Loudet
32. Miramont-de-Comminges
33. Mondilhan
34. Montgaillard-sur-Save
35. Montmaurin
36. Montréjeau
37. Nénigan
38. Nizan-Gesse
39. Péguilhan
40. Pointis-Inard
41. Ponlat-Taillebourg
42. Régades
43. Rieucazé
44. Saint-Ferréol-de-Comminges
45. Saint-Gaudens
46. Saint-Ignan
47. Saint-Lary-Boujean
48. Saint-Loup-en-Comminges
49. Saint-Marcet
50. Saint-Pé-Delbosc
51. Saint-Plancard
52. Saman
53. Sarrecave
54. Sarremezan
55. Saux-et-Pomarède
56. Savarthès
57. Sédeilhac
58. Les Tourreilles
59. Valentine
60. Villeneuve-de-Rivière
61. Villeneuve-Lécussan
