= Saman, Haute-Garonne =

Saman
- Commune
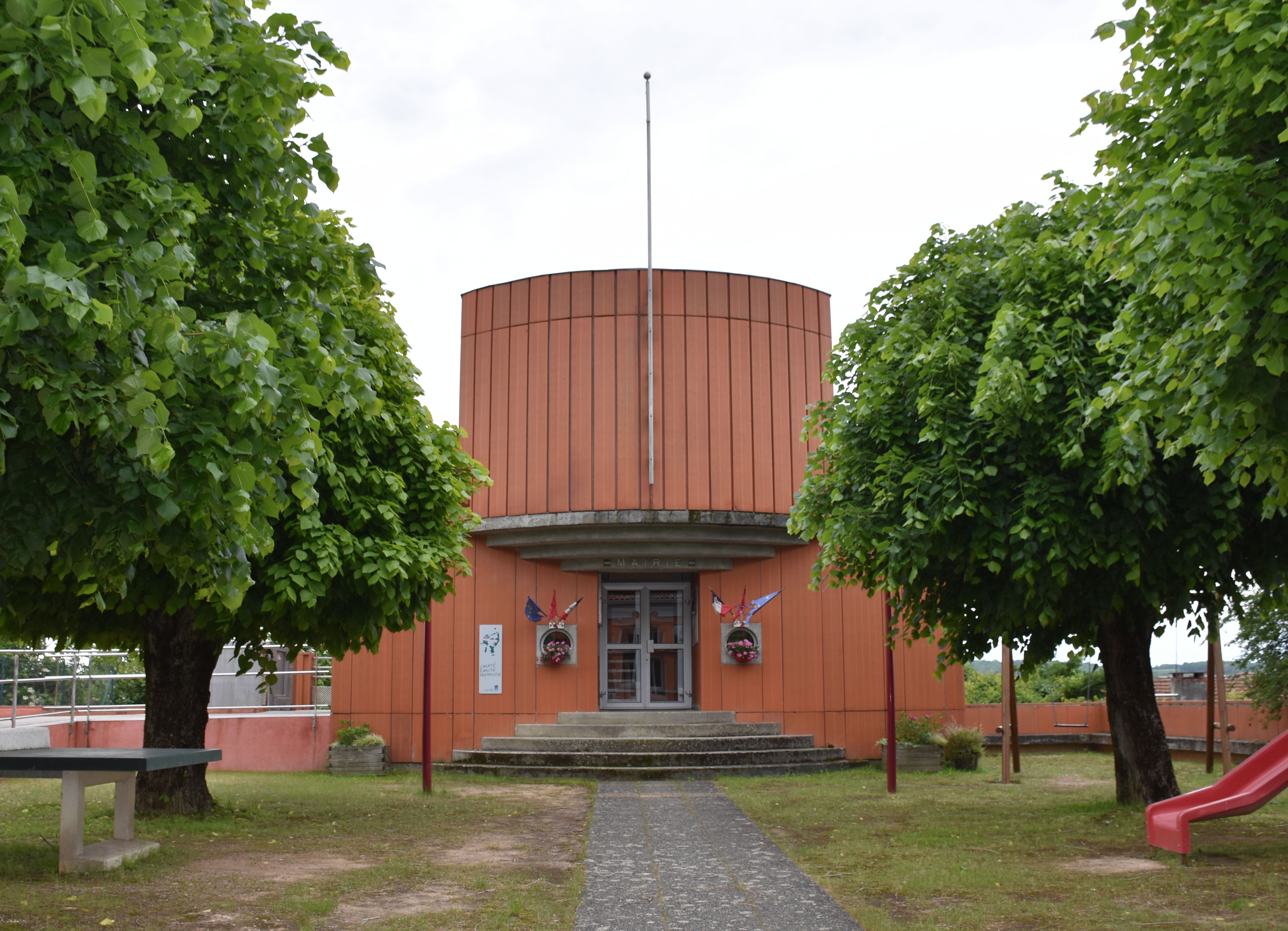
- Saman Town hall
- Location of Saman
- Location within France Location within Occitanie
- Coordinates: 43°14′15″N 0°43′15″E
- Country: France
- Region: Occitania
- Department: Haute-Garonne
- Arrondissement: Saint-Gaudens
- Canton: Saint-Gaudens

Government
  - Mayor (2020–2026): Julien Lacroix
- Area^{1}: 5.54 km^{2} (2.14 sq mi)
- Elevation: 390 m (1,280 ft)
- Highest elevation: 391 m (1,283 ft)
- Lowest elevation: 266 m (873 ft)
- Population (2023): 143
  - Density: 25.8/km^{2} (66.9/sq mi)
- Time zone: UTC+01:00 (CET)
  - Summer (DST): UTC+02:00 (CEST)
- INSEE/Postal code: 31528 /31350
- ^{1} French Land Register data, which excludes lakes, ponds, glaciers > 1 km^{2} (0.386 sq mi or 247 acres) and river estuaries.

Saman (French pronunciation: [samɑ̃]) is a commune in the Haute-Garonne department in southwestern France.

== Population ==
Historical population
Year	Pop.	±% p.a.
1968	174	—
1975	149	−2.19%
1982	117	−3.39%
1990	139	+2.18%
1999	142	+0.24%
2007	150	+0.69%
2012	170	+2.53%
2017	130	−5.22%
2023	143	+1.60%
Source: INSEE

== See also ==
- Communes of the Haute-Garonne department
