= Sédeilhac =

- Commune
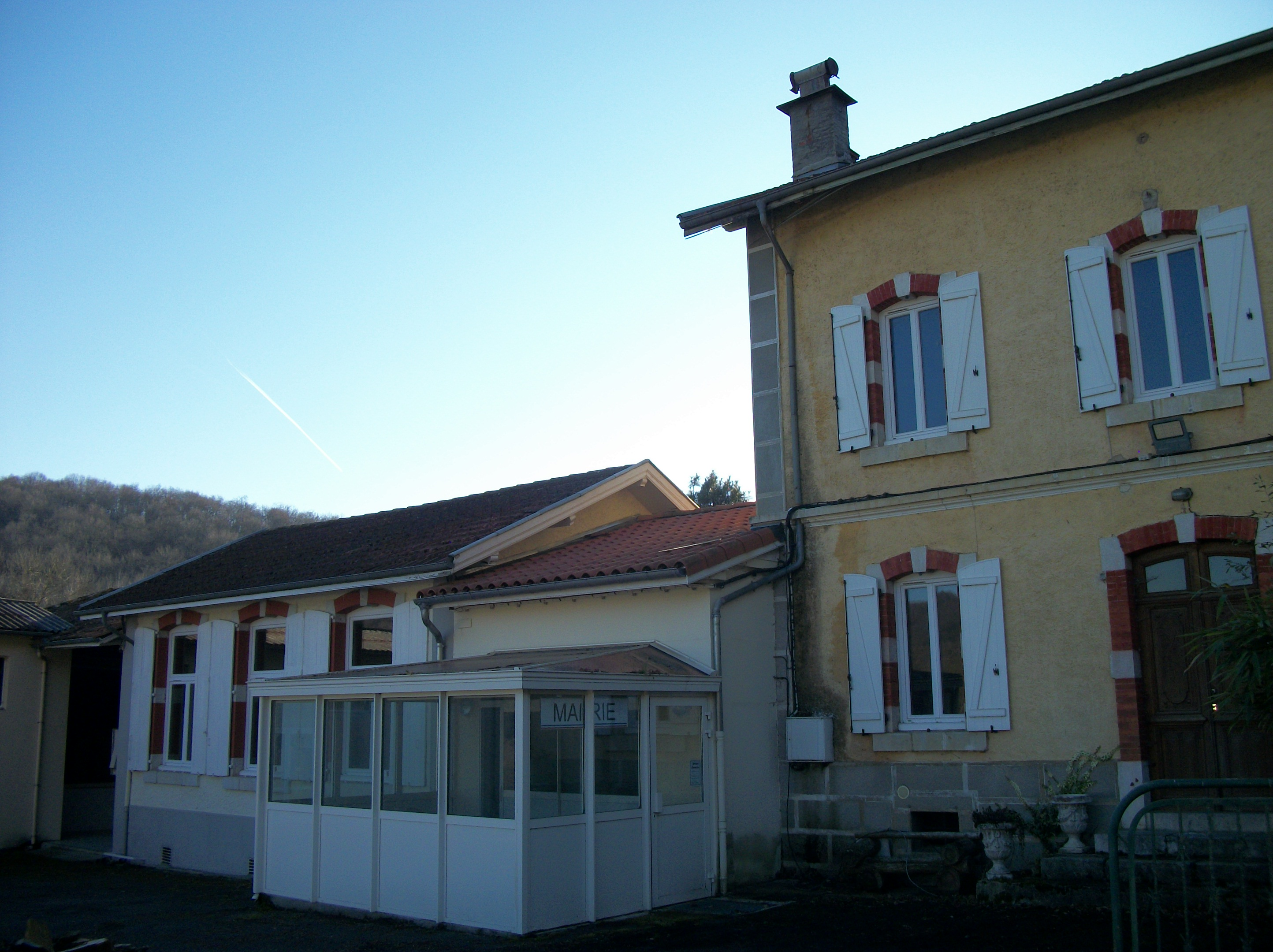
- The town hall in Sédeilhac
- Location of Sédeilhac
- Location within France Location within Occitanie
- Coordinates: 43°09′14″N 0°33′23″E
- Country: France
- Region: Occitania
- Department: Haute-Garonne
- Arrondissement: Saint-Gaudens
- Canton: Saint-Gaudens

Government
  - Mayor (2020–2026): Philippe Casteran
- Area^{1}: 6.16 km^{2} (2.38 sq mi)
- Elevation: 420 m (1,380 ft)
- Highest elevation: 553 m (1,814 ft)
- Lowest elevation: 397 m (1,302 ft)
- Population (2023): 63
  - Density: 10/km^{2} (26/sq mi)
- Time zone: UTC+01:00 (CET)
  - Summer (DST): UTC+02:00 (CEST)
- INSEE/Postal code: 31539 /31580
- ^{1} French Land Register data, which excludes lakes, ponds, glaciers > 1 km^{2} (0.386 sq mi or 247 acres) and river estuaries.

Sédeilhac (French pronunciation: [sedɛjak]; Occitan: Sedelhac) is a commune in the Haute-Garonne department in southwestern France.

== Population ==
Historical population
Year	Pop.	±% p.a.
1968	113	—
1975	97	−2.16%
1982	76	−3.43%
1990	76	+0.00%
1999	69	−1.07%
2007	63	−1.13%
2012	56	−2.33%
2017	61	+1.73%
2023	63	+0.54%
Source: INSEE

== See also ==
- Communes of the Haute-Garonne department
