= Saux-et-Pomarède =

- Commune
- Location of Saux-et-Pomarède
- Location within France Location within Occitanie
- Coordinates: 43°09′14″N 0°43′06″E
- Country: France
- Region: Occitania
- Department: Haute-Garonne
- Arrondissement: Saint-Gaudens
- Canton: Saint-Gaudens

Government
  - Mayor (2020–2026): Evelyne Sansonetto
- Area^{1}: 12.52 km^{2} (4.83 sq mi)
- Elevation: 372 m (1,220 ft)
- Highest elevation: 497 m (1,631 ft)
- Lowest elevation: 369 m (1,211 ft)
- Population (2023): 245
  - Density: 19.6/km^{2} (50.7/sq mi)
- Time zone: UTC+01:00 (CET)
  - Summer (DST): UTC+02:00 (CEST)
- INSEE/Postal code: 31536 /31800
- ^{1} French Land Register data, which excludes lakes, ponds, glaciers > 1 km^{2} (0.386 sq mi or 247 acres) and river estuaries.

Saux-et-Pomarède is a commune in the Haute-Garonne department in southwestern France.

== Population ==
Historical population
Year	Pop.	±% p.a.
1968	102	—
1975	122	+2.59%
1982	194	+6.85%
1990	251	+3.27%
1999	251	+0.00%
2007	262	+0.54%
2012	271	+0.68%
2017	272	+0.07%
2023	245	−1.73%
Source: INSEE

== See also ==
- Communes of the Haute-Garonne department
