= Aspret-Sarrat =

- Commune
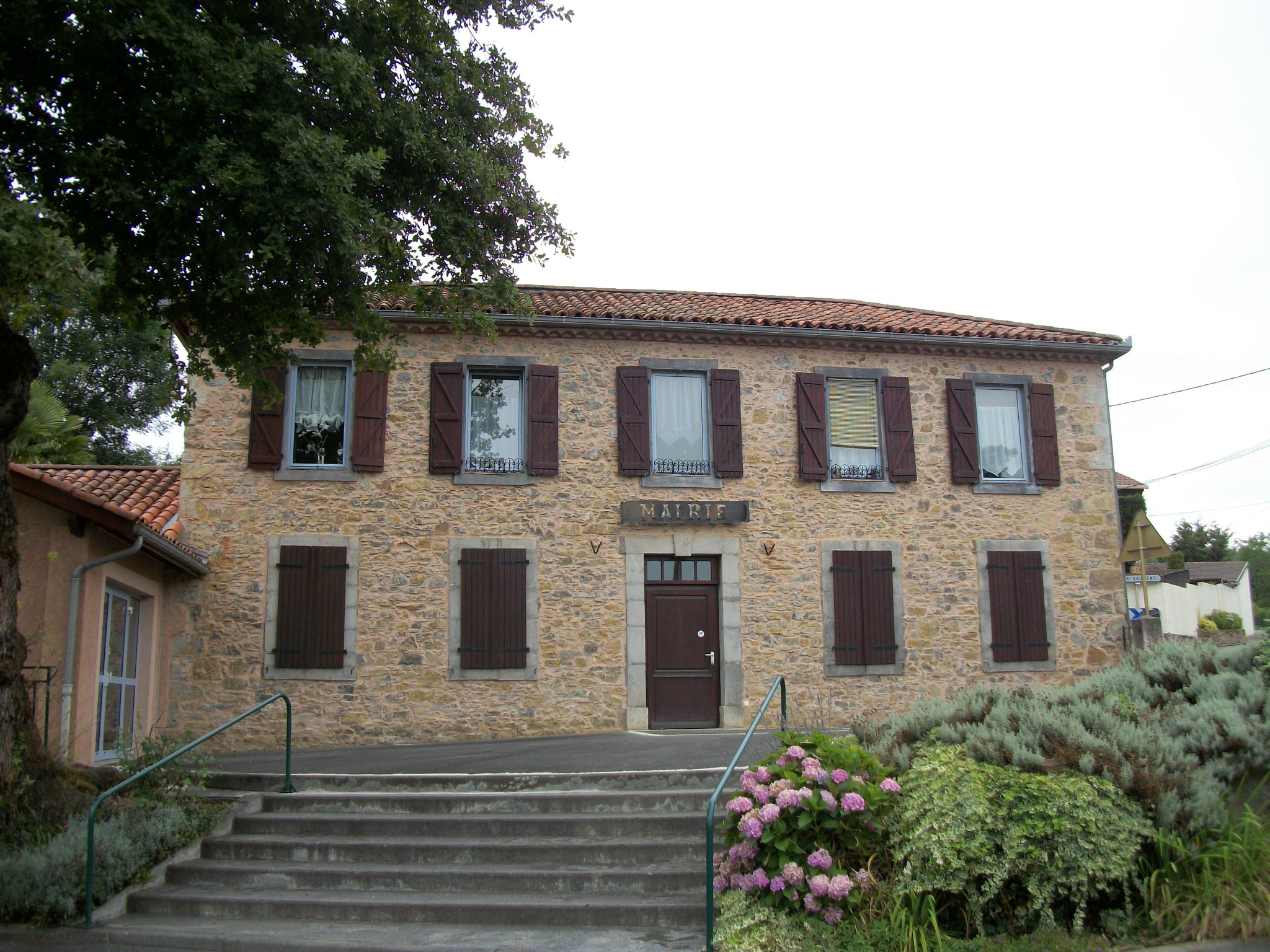
- Town hall
- Location of Aspret-Sarrat
- Location within France Location within Occitanie
- Coordinates: 43°04′05″N 0°43′04″E
- Country: France
- Region: Occitania
- Department: Haute-Garonne
- Arrondissement: Saint-Gaudens
- Canton: Saint-Gaudens
- Intercommunality: CC Cœur Coteaux Comminges

Government
  - Mayor (2022–2026): Lydie Nogues
- Area^{1}: 3.82 km^{2} (1.47 sq mi)
- Elevation: 400 m (1,300 ft)
- Highest elevation: 568 m (1,864 ft)
- Lowest elevation: 388 m (1,273 ft)
- Population (2023): 130
  - Density: 34/km^{2} (88/sq mi)
- Time zone: UTC+01:00 (CET)
  - Summer (DST): UTC+02:00 (CEST)
- INSEE/Postal code: 31021 /31800
- ^{1} French Land Register data, which excludes lakes, ponds, glaciers > 1 km^{2} (0.386 sq mi or 247 acres) and river estuaries.

Aspret-Sarrat is a commune in the Haute-Garonne department in southwestern France.

== Population ==
Historical population
| Year | Pop. | ±% p.a. |
|---|---|---|
| 1968 | 53 | — |
| 1975 | 68 | +3.62% |
| 1982 | 77 | +1.79% |
| 1990 | 96 | +2.80% |
| 1999 | 97 | +0.12% |
| 2007 | 139 | +4.60% |
| 2012 | 145 | +0.85% |
| 2017 | 136 | −1.27% |
| 2023 | 130 | −0.75% |
Source: INSEE

== See also ==
- Communes of the Haute-Garonne department
