= Loudet =

- Commune
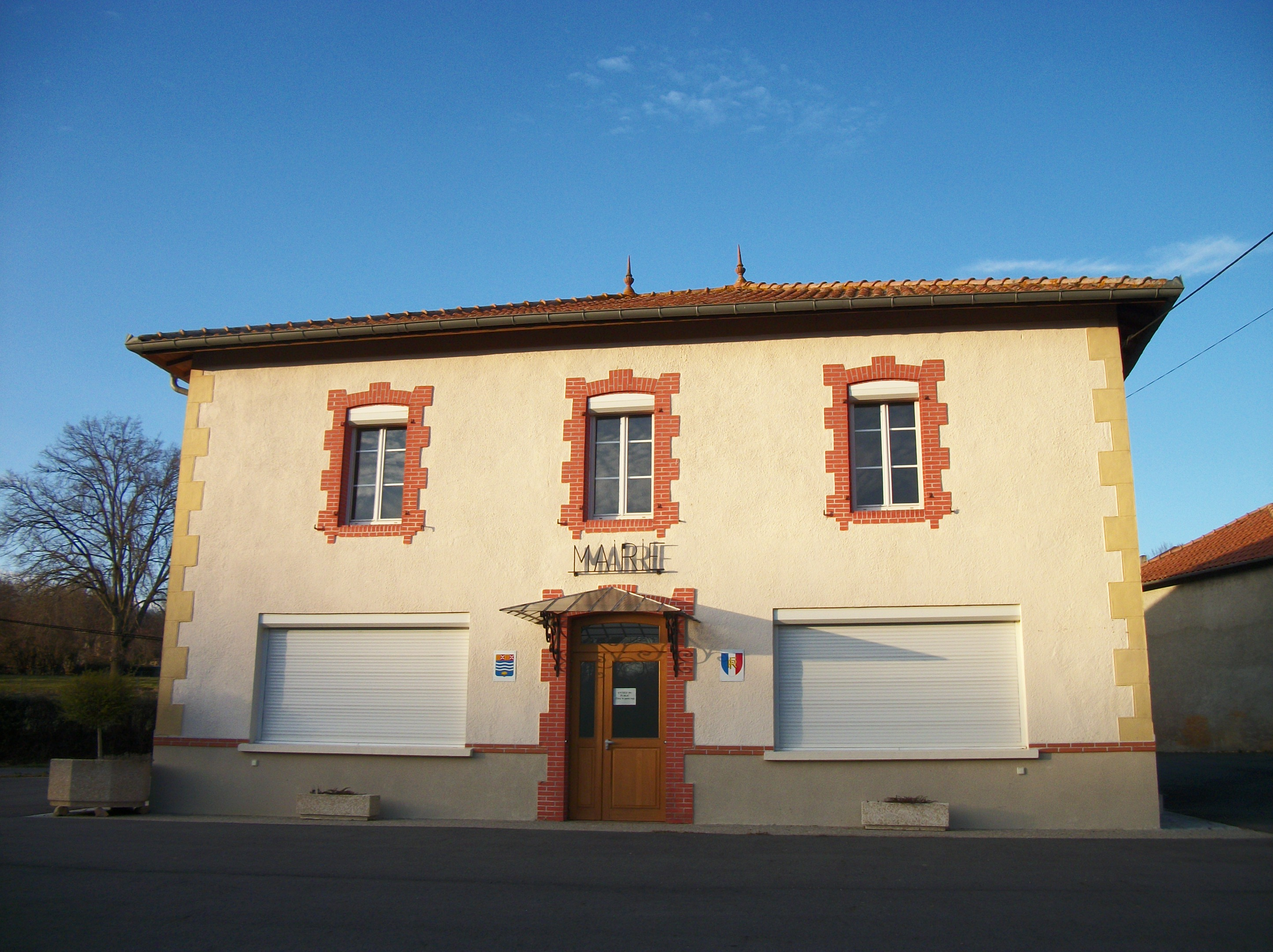
- The town hall in Loudet

- Coat of arms
- Location of Loudet
- Location within France Location within Occitanie
- Coordinates: 43°08′57″N 0°34′24″E
- Country: France
- Region: Occitania
- Department: Haute-Garonne
- Arrondissement: Saint-Gaudens
- Canton: Saint-Gaudens

Government
  - Mayor (2020–2026): Hervé Athiel
- Area^{1}: 5.13 km^{2} (1.98 sq mi)
- Elevation: 500 m (1,600 ft)
- Highest elevation: 525 m (1,722 ft)
- Lowest elevation: 447 m (1,467 ft)
- Population (2023): 191
  - Density: 37.2/km^{2} (96.4/sq mi)
- Time zone: UTC+01:00 (CET)
  - Summer (DST): UTC+02:00 (CEST)
- INSEE/Postal code: 31305 /31580
- ^{1} French Land Register data, which excludes lakes, ponds, glaciers > 1 km^{2} (0.386 sq mi or 247 acres) and river estuaries.

Loudet is a commune in the Haute-Garonne department in southwestern France.

== Population ==
Historical population
Year	Pop.	±% p.a.
1968	231	—
1975	232	+0.06%
1982	236	+0.24%
1990	212	−1.33%
1999	218	+0.31%
2007	213	−0.29%
2012	198	−1.45%
2017	196	−0.20%
2023	191	−0.43%
Source: INSEE

== See also ==
- Communes of the Haute-Garonne department
