= Régades =

- Commune
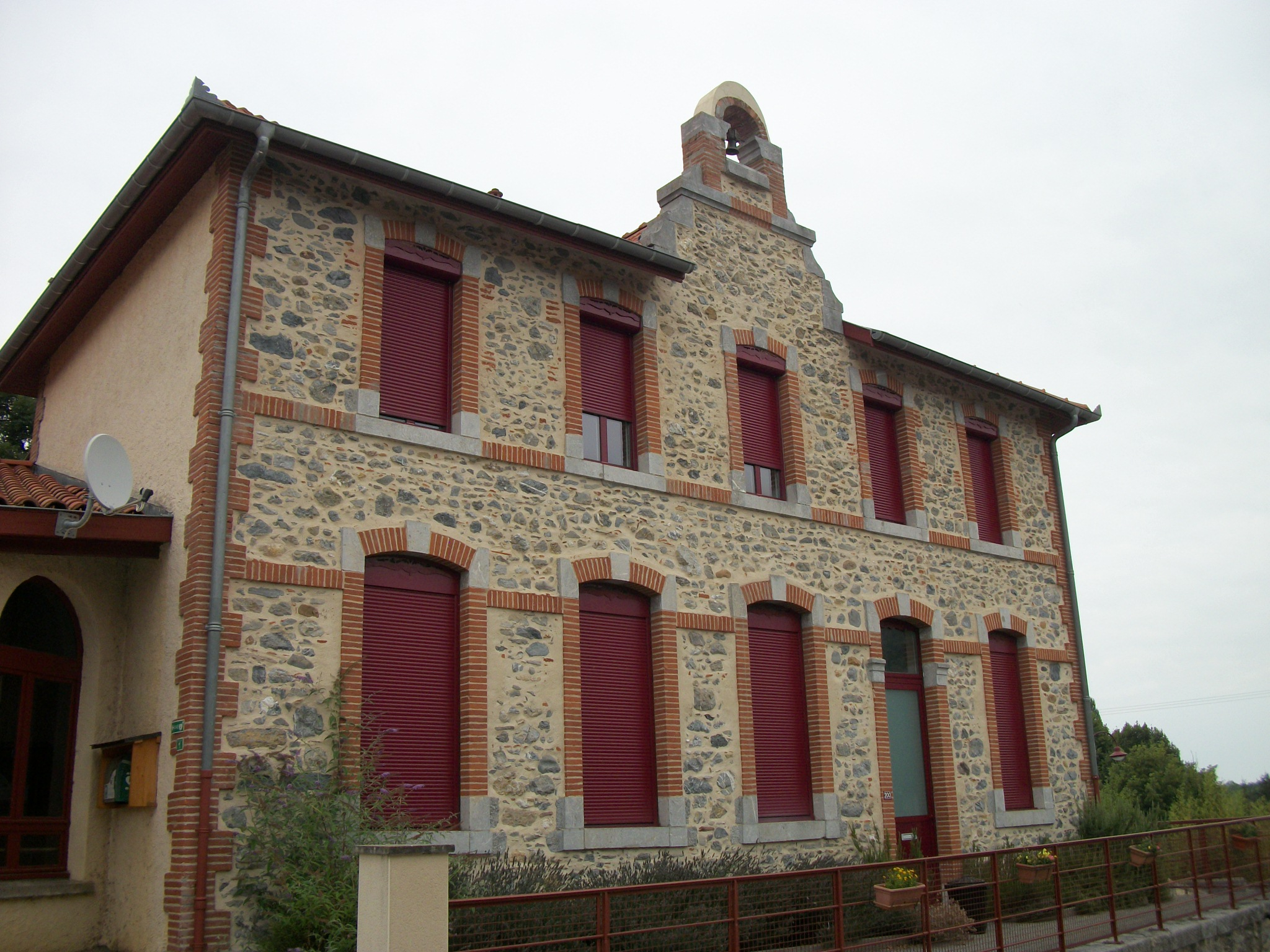
- Régades Town hall
- Location of Régades
- Location within France Location within Occitanie
- Coordinates: 43°03′02″N 0°43′23″E
- Country: France
- Region: Occitania
- Department: Haute-Garonne
- Arrondissement: Saint-Gaudens
- Canton: Saint-Gaudens

Government
  - Mayor (2020–2026): Marlène Gasto
- Area^{1}: 3.62 km^{2} (1.40 sq mi)
- Elevation: 409 m (1,342 ft)
- Highest elevation: 630 m (2,070 ft)
- Lowest elevation: 377 m (1,237 ft)
- Population (2023): 137
  - Density: 37.8/km^{2} (98.0/sq mi)
- Time zone: UTC+01:00 (CET)
  - Summer (DST): UTC+02:00 (CEST)
- INSEE/Postal code: 31449 /31800
- ^{1} French Land Register data, which excludes lakes, ponds, glaciers > 1 km^{2} (0.386 sq mi or 247 acres) and river estuaries.

Régades (French pronunciation: [ʁeɡad]; Occitan: Regadas) is a commune in the Haute-Garonne department in southwestern France.

== Population ==
Historical population
Year	Pop.	±% p.a.
1968	83	—
1975	103	+3.13%
1982	103	+0.00%
1990	122	+2.14%
1999	112	−0.95%
2007	135	+2.36%
2012	133	−0.30%
2017	133	+0.00%
2023	137	+0.50%
Source: INSEE

== See also ==
- Communes of the Haute-Garonne department
