= Landorthe =

- Commune
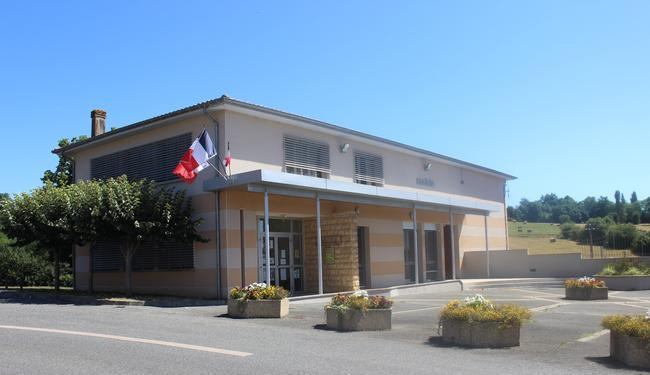
- The town hall in Landorthe
- Location of Landorthe
- Location within France Location within Occitanie
- Coordinates: 43°07′57″N 0°47′05″E
- Country: France
- Region: Occitania
- Department: Haute-Garonne
- Arrondissement: Saint-Gaudens
- Canton: Saint-Gaudens

Government
  - Mayor (2020–2026): Lucienne Cortinas
- Area^{1}: 9.65 km^{2} (3.73 sq mi)
- Elevation: 380 m (1,250 ft)
- Highest elevation: 463 m (1,519 ft)
- Lowest elevation: 343 m (1,125 ft)
- Population (2023): 1,030
  - Density: 107/km^{2} (276/sq mi)
- Time zone: UTC+01:00 (CET)
  - Summer (DST): UTC+02:00 (CEST)
- INSEE/Postal code: 31270 /31800
- ^{1} French Land Register data, which excludes lakes, ponds, glaciers > 1 km^{2} (0.386 sq mi or 247 acres) and river estuaries.

Landorthe (French pronunciation: [lɑ̃dɔʁt]; Occitan: Era Andòrta) is a commune in the Haute-Garonne department in southwestern France.

== Population ==
Historical population
Year	Pop.	±% p.a.
1968	181	—
1975	389	+11.55%
1982	611	+6.66%
1990	757	+2.71%
1999	779	+0.32%
2007	931	+2.25%
2012	966	+0.74%
2017	991	+0.51%
2023	1,030	+0.65%
Source: INSEE

== See also ==
- Communes of the Haute-Garonne department
