= Villeneuve-Lécussan =

- Commune
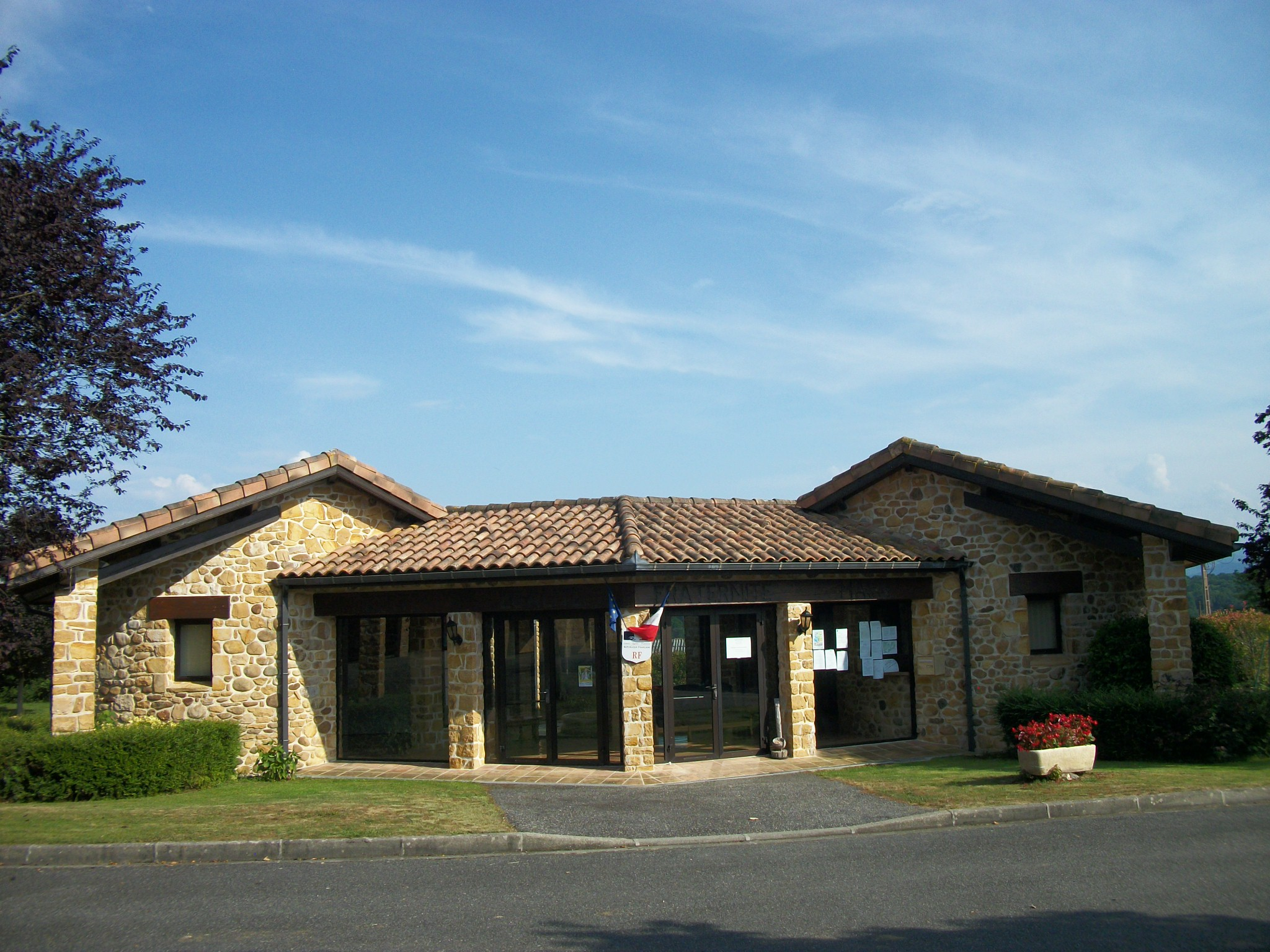
- Villeneuve Town Hall
- Location of Villeneuve-Lécussan
- Location within France Location within Occitanie
- Coordinates: 43°09′03″N 0°29′58″E
- Country: France
- Region: Occitania
- Department: Haute-Garonne
- Arrondissement: Saint-Gaudens
- Canton: Saint-Gaudens

Government
  - Mayor (2020–2026): Lionel Batmale
- Area^{1}: 16.1 km^{2} (6.2 sq mi)
- Elevation: 585 m (1,919 ft)
- Highest elevation: 587 m (1,926 ft)
- Lowest elevation: 420 m (1,380 ft)
- Population (2023): 544
  - Density: 33.8/km^{2} (87.5/sq mi)
- Time zone: UTC+01:00 (CET)
  - Summer (DST): UTC+02:00 (CEST)
- INSEE/Postal code: 31586 /31580
- ^{1} French Land Register data, which excludes lakes, ponds, glaciers > 1 km^{2} (0.386 sq mi or 247 acres) and river estuaries.

Villeneuve-Lécussan (French pronunciation: [vilnœv lekysɑ̃]; Occitan: Vièlanava de Lecuçan) is a commune in the Haute-Garonne department in southwestern France.

== Population ==
Historical population
Year	Pop.	±% p.a.
1968	460	—
1975	436	−0.76%
1982	441	+0.16%
1990	477	+0.99%
1999	494	+0.39%
2007	552	+1.40%
2012	545	−0.25%
2017	556	+0.40%
2023	544	−0.36%
Source: INSEE

== See also ==
- Communes of the Haute-Garonne department
