= Balesta =

- Commune
- Location of Balesta
- Location within France Location within Occitanie
- Coordinates: 43°12′03″N 0°34′07″E
- Country: France
- Region: Occitania
- Department: Haute-Garonne
- Arrondissement: Saint-Gaudens
- Canton: Saint-Gaudens

Government
  - Mayor (2020–2026): Jean-Charles Dasque
- Area^{1}: 7.16 km^{2} (2.76 sq mi)
- Elevation: 402 m (1,319 ft)
- Highest elevation: 498 m (1,634 ft)
- Lowest elevation: 355 m (1,165 ft)
- Population (2023): 169
  - Density: 23.6/km^{2} (61.1/sq mi)
- Time zone: UTC+01:00 (CET)
  - Summer (DST): UTC+02:00 (CEST)
- INSEE/Postal code: 31043 /31580
- ^{1} French Land Register data, which excludes lakes, ponds, glaciers > 1 km^{2} (0.386 sq mi or 247 acres) and river estuaries.

Balesta (French pronunciation: [balɛsta]; Occitan: Belestar) is a commune of the Haute-Garonne department in southwestern France.

== Population ==
Historical population
Year	Pop.	±% p.a.
1968	253	—
1975	197	−3.51%
1982	177	−1.52%
1990	172	−0.36%
1999	149	−1.58%
2007	173	+1.88%
2012	179	+0.68%
2017	148	−3.73%
2023	169	+2.24%
Source: INSEE

== See also ==
- Communes of the Haute-Garonne department
