= Escanecrabe =

- Commune
- Coat of arms
- Location of Escanecrabe
- Location within France Location within Occitanie
- Coordinates: 43°16′26″N 0°44′59″E
- Country: France
- Region: Occitania
- Department: Haute-Garonne
- Arrondissement: Saint-Gaudens
- Canton: Saint-Gaudens

Government
  - Mayor (2020–2026): Jean-Claude Arseguet
- Area^{1}: 16.07 km^{2} (6.20 sq mi)
- Elevation: 370 m (1,210 ft)
- Highest elevation: 376 m (1,234 ft)
- Lowest elevation: 240 m (790 ft)
- Population (2023): 210
  - Density: 13/km^{2} (34/sq mi)
- Time zone: UTC+01:00 (CET)
  - Summer (DST): UTC+02:00 (CEST)
- INSEE/Postal code: 31170 /31350
- ^{1} French Land Register data, which excludes lakes, ponds, glaciers > 1 km^{2} (0.386 sq mi or 247 acres) and river estuaries.

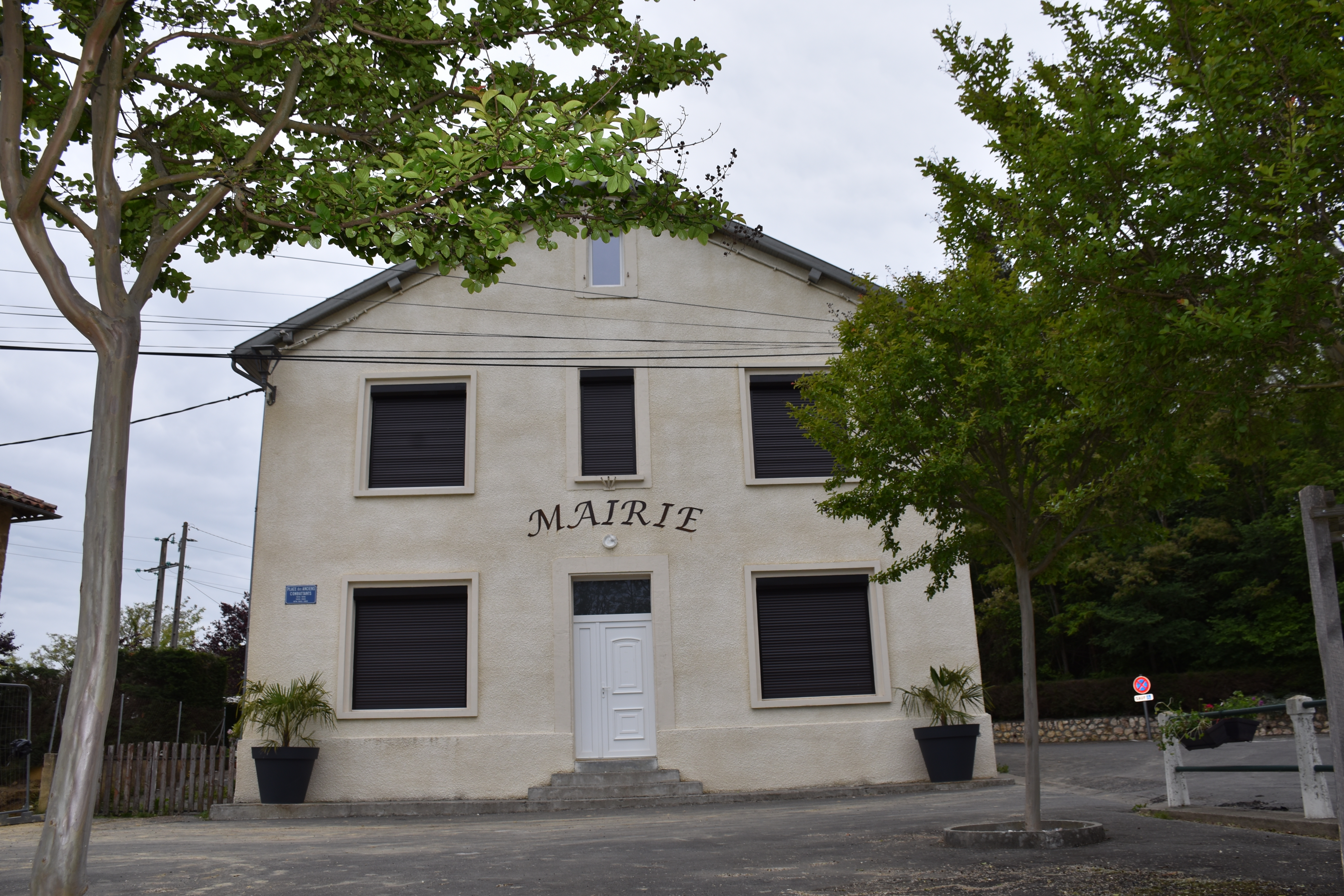
The Town Hall of Escanecrabe

Escanecrabe (Occitan: Crabescane) is a commune in the Haute-Garonne department in southwestern France.

== Population ==
Historical population
Year	Pop.	±% p.a.
1968	278	—
1975	226	−2.92%
1982	211	−0.98%
1990	225	+0.81%
1999	240	+0.72%
2007	247	+0.36%
2012	220	−2.29%
2017	246	+2.26%
2023	210	−2.60%
Source: INSEE

== See also ==
- Communes of the Haute-Garonne department
