= Lalouret-Laffiteau =

- Commune
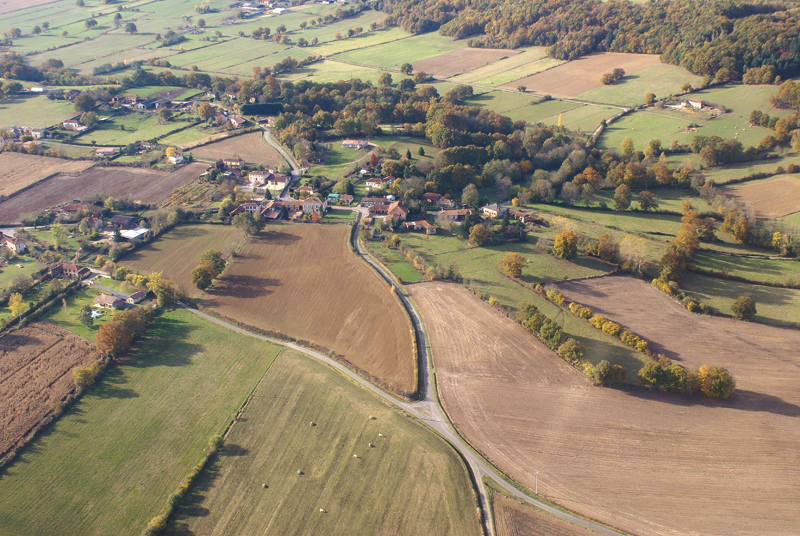
- An aerial view of Lalouret
- Location of Lalouret-Laffiteau
- Location within France Location within Occitanie
- Coordinates: 43°11′07″N 0°42′16″E
- Country: France
- Region: Occitania
- Department: Haute-Garonne
- Arrondissement: Saint-Gaudens
- Canton: Saint-Gaudens

Government
  - Mayor (2020–2026): Jean-Claude Lafforgue
- Area^{1}: 5.39 km^{2} (2.08 sq mi)
- Elevation: 410 m (1,350 ft)
- Highest elevation: 464 m (1,522 ft)
- Lowest elevation: 356 m (1,168 ft)
- Population (2023): 134
  - Density: 24.9/km^{2} (64.4/sq mi)
- Time zone: UTC+01:00 (CET)
  - Summer (DST): UTC+02:00 (CEST)
- INSEE/Postal code: 31268 /31800
- ^{1} French Land Register data, which excludes lakes, ponds, glaciers > 1 km^{2} (0.386 sq mi or 247 acres) and river estuaries.

Lalouret-Laffiteau (French pronunciation: [laluʁɛ lafito]; Occitan: Laloret e era Fitau) is a commune in the Haute-Garonne department in southwestern France. As of 2017, the population of the town is 134.

== Population ==
Historical population
Year	Pop.	±% p.a.
1968	124	—
1975	111	−1.57%
1982	104	−0.93%
1990	113	+1.04%
1999	108	−0.50%
2007	118	+1.11%
2012	139	+3.33%
2017	134	−0.73%
2023	134	+0.00%
Source: INSEE

== See also ==
- Communes of the Haute-Garonne department
