= Lodes, Haute-Garonne =

Lodes
- Commune
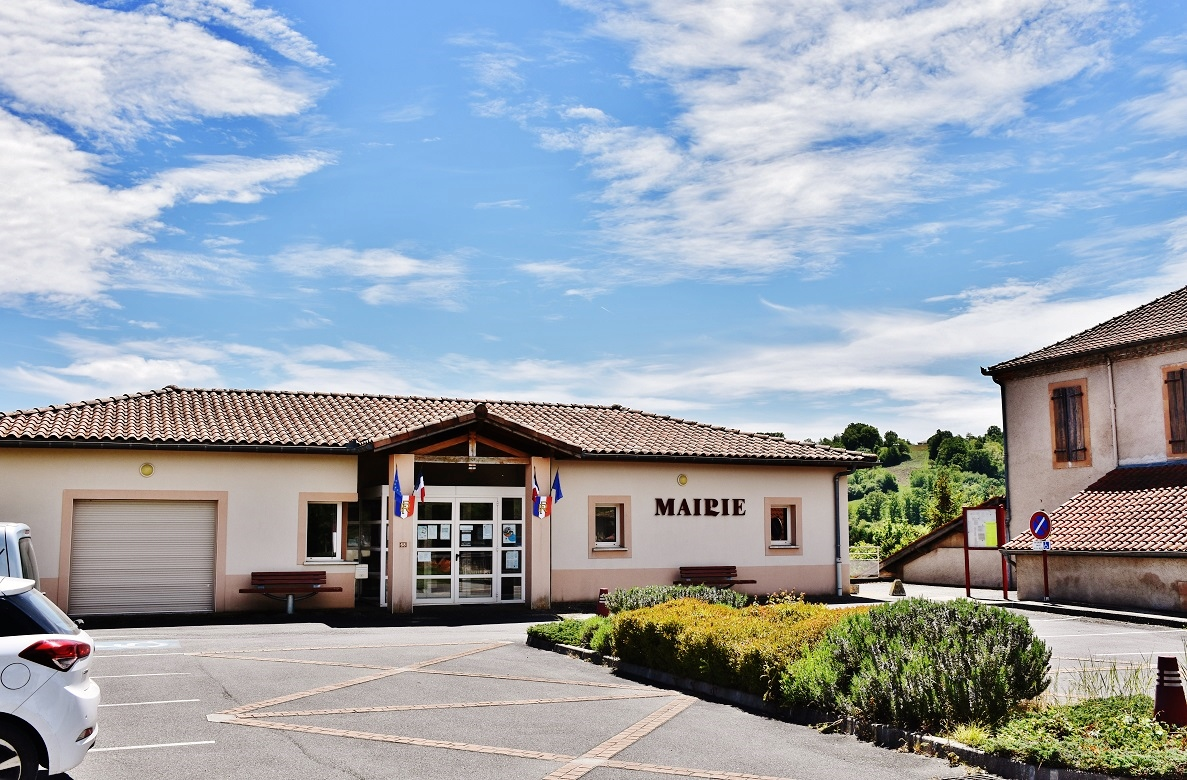
- Lodes Town hall
- Location of Lodes
- Location within France Location within Occitanie
- Coordinates: 43°10′07″N 0°40′32″E
- Country: France
- Region: Occitania
- Department: Haute-Garonne
- Arrondissement: Saint-Gaudens
- Canton: Saint-Gaudens

Government
  - Mayor (2020–2026): Véronique Berrebi
- Area^{1}: 13.74 km^{2} (5.31 sq mi)
- Elevation: 453 m (1,486 ft)
- Highest elevation: 493 m (1,617 ft)
- Lowest elevation: 367 m (1,204 ft)
- Population (2023): 308
  - Density: 22.4/km^{2} (58.1/sq mi)
- Time zone: UTC+01:00 (CET)
  - Summer (DST): UTC+02:00 (CEST)
- INSEE/Postal code: 31302 /31800
- ^{1} French Land Register data, which excludes lakes, ponds, glaciers > 1 km^{2} (0.386 sq mi or 247 acres) and river estuaries.

Lodes (French pronunciation: [lɔd]; Occitan: Lòdas) is a commune in the Haute-Garonne department in southwestern France.

== Population ==
Historical population
Year	Pop.	±% p.a.
1968	279	—
1975	255	−1.28%
1982	243	−0.69%
1990	247	+0.20%
1999	255	+0.35%
2007	268	+0.62%
2012	287	+1.38%
2017	292	+0.35%
2023	308	+0.89%
Source: INSEE

== See also ==
- Communes of the Haute-Garonne department
