= Rieucazé =

- Commune
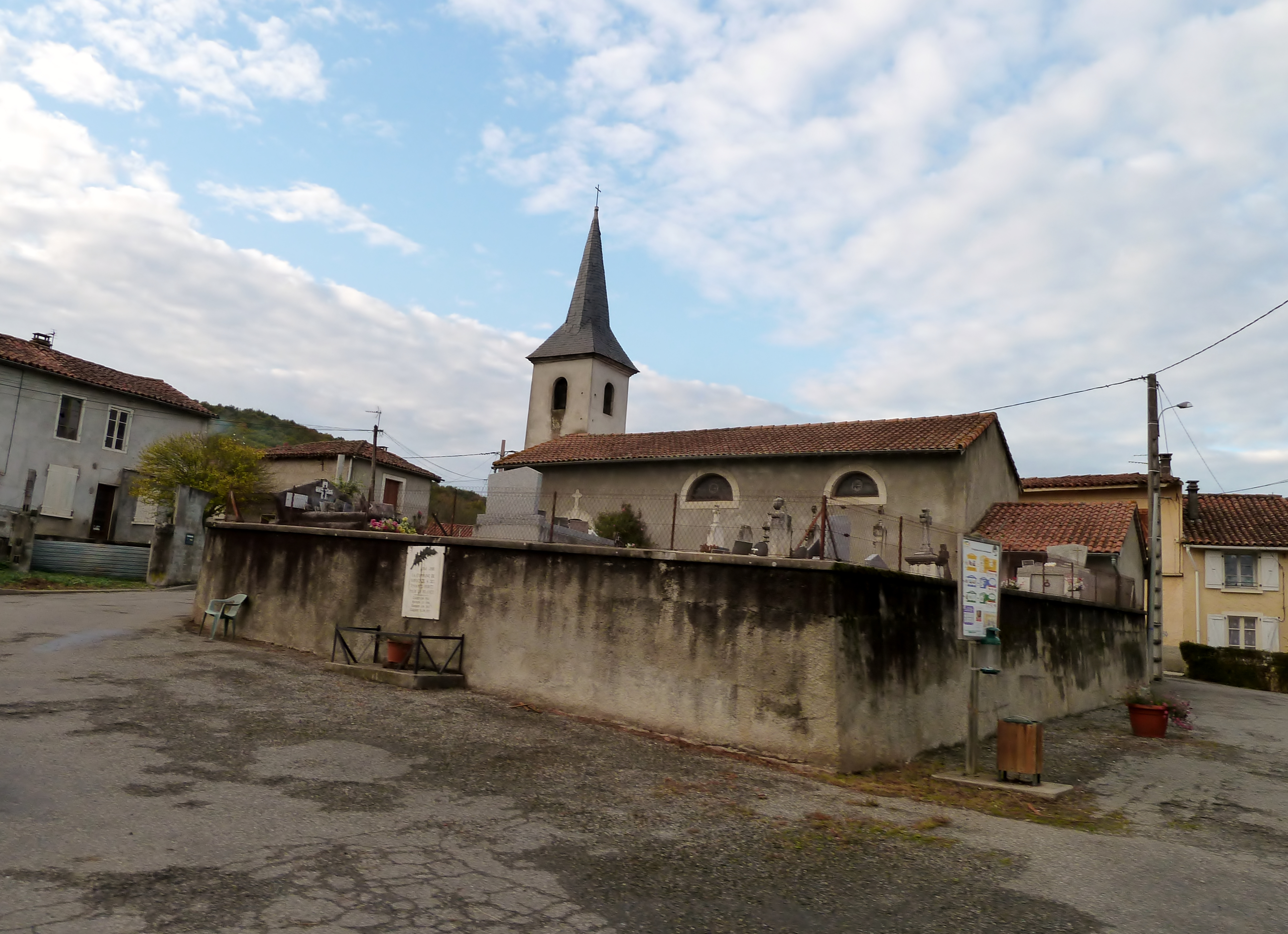
- The church in Rieucazé
- Location of Rieucazé
- Location within France Location within Occitanie
- Coordinates: 43°04′39″N 0°45′32″E
- Country: France
- Region: Occitania
- Department: Haute-Garonne
- Arrondissement: Saint-Gaudens
- Canton: Saint-Gaudens
- Intercommunality: Cœur et Coteaux du Comminges

Government
  - Mayor (2020–2026): Alain Pouteau
- Area^{1}: 2.03 km^{2} (0.78 sq mi)
- Elevation: 395 m (1,296 ft)
- Highest elevation: 561 m (1,841 ft)
- Lowest elevation: 347 m (1,138 ft)
- Population (2023): 52
  - Density: 26/km^{2} (66/sq mi)
- Time zone: UTC+01:00 (CET)
  - Summer (DST): UTC+02:00 (CEST)
- INSEE/Postal code: 31452 /31800
- ^{1} French Land Register data, which excludes lakes, ponds, glaciers > 1 km^{2} (0.386 sq mi or 247 acres) and river estuaries.

Rieucazé (French pronunciation: [ʁjœkaze]; Occitan: Riucasèr) is a commune in the Haute-Garonne department in southwestern France.

== Population ==
Historical population
Year	Pop.	±% p.a.
1968	47	—
1975	43	−1.26%
1982	50	+2.18%
1990	48	−0.51%
1999	37	−2.85%
2007	45	+2.48%
2012	48	+1.30%
2017	54	+2.38%
2023	52	−0.63%
Source: INSEE

== See also ==
- Communes of the Haute-Garonne department
