= Lespiteau =

- Commune
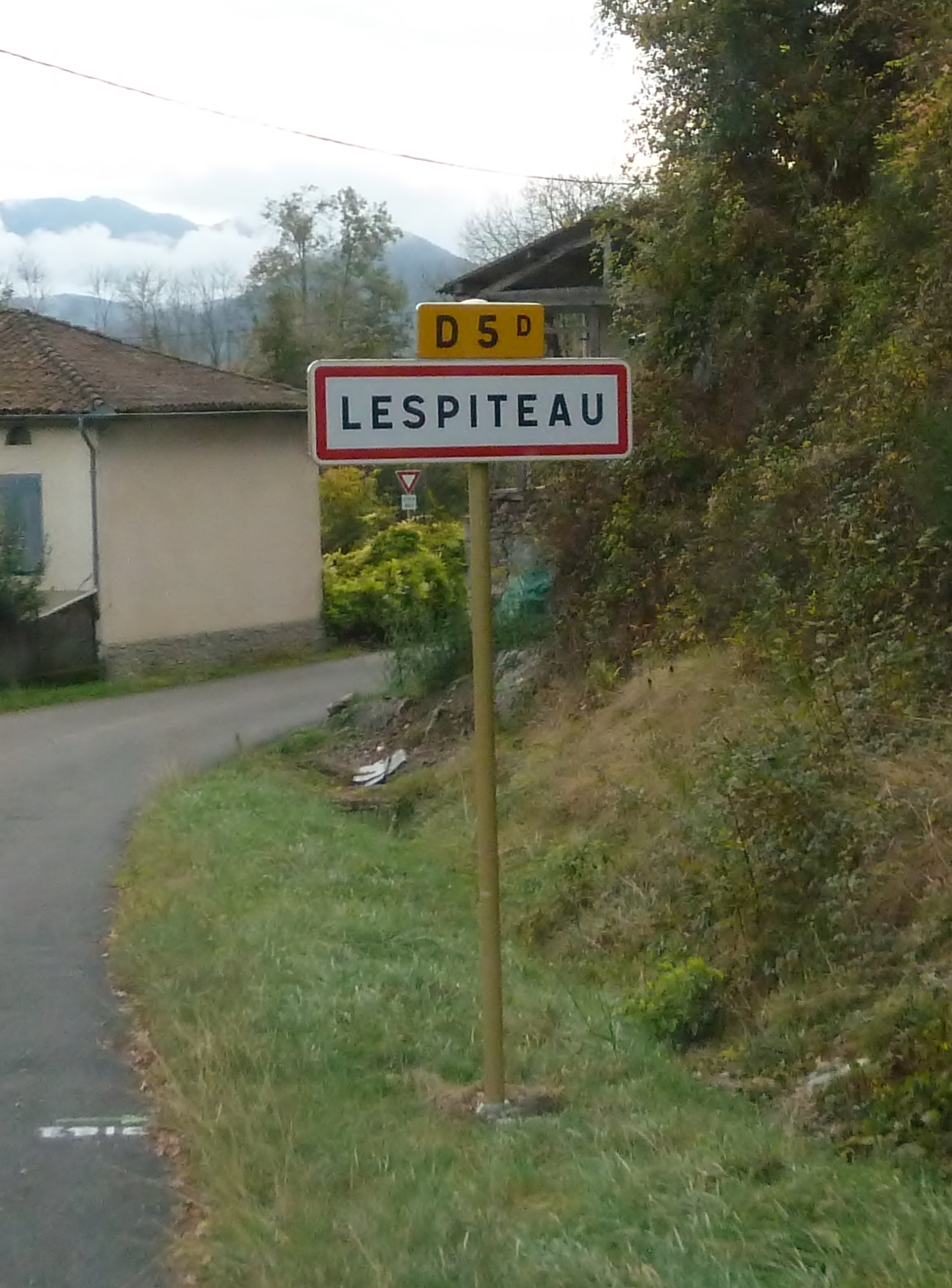
- The road into Lespiteau
- Location of Lespiteau
- Location within France Location within Occitanie
- Coordinates: 43°04′06″N 0°45′41″E
- Country: France
- Region: Occitania
- Department: Haute-Garonne
- Arrondissement: Saint-Gaudens
- Canton: Saint-Gaudens
- Intercommunality: Cœur et Coteaux du Comminges

Government
  - Mayor (2023–2026): Jérôme Dupuy
- Area^{1}: 1.81 km^{2} (0.70 sq mi)
- Elevation: 359 m (1,178 ft)
- Highest elevation: 486 m (1,594 ft)
- Lowest elevation: 352 m (1,155 ft)
- Population (2023): 78
  - Density: 43/km^{2} (110/sq mi)
- Time zone: UTC+01:00 (CET)
  - Summer (DST): UTC+02:00 (CEST)
- INSEE/Postal code: 31294 /31160
- ^{1} French Land Register data, which excludes lakes, ponds, glaciers > 1 km^{2} (0.386 sq mi or 247 acres) and river estuaries.

Lespiteau (French pronunciation: [lɛspito]; Occitan: Eth Espitau) is a commune in the Haute-Garonne department in southwestern France.

== Population ==
Historical population
Year	Pop.	±% p.a.
1968	66	—
1975	69	+0.64%
1982	62	−1.52%
1990	68	+1.16%
1999	68	+0.00%
2007	85	+2.83%
2012	73	−3.00%
2017	103	+7.13%
2023	78	−4.53%
Source: INSEE

== See also ==
- Communes of the Haute-Garonne department
