= Estancarbon =

- Commune
- Location of Estancarbon
- Location within France Location within Occitanie
- Coordinates: 43°06′20″N 0°47′12″E
- Country: France
- Region: Occitania
- Department: Haute-Garonne
- Arrondissement: Saint-Gaudens
- Canton: Saint-Gaudens

Government
  - Mayor (2020–2026): Daniel Soupène
- Area^{1}: 6.23 km^{2} (2.41 sq mi)
- Elevation: 376 m (1,234 ft)
- Highest elevation: 392 m (1,286 ft)
- Lowest elevation: 325 m (1,066 ft)
- Population (2023): 612
  - Density: 98.2/km^{2} (254/sq mi)
- Time zone: UTC+01:00 (CET)
  - Summer (DST): UTC+02:00 (CEST)
- INSEE/Postal code: 31175 /31800
- Website: www.estancarbon.com
- ^{1} French Land Register data, which excludes lakes, ponds, glaciers > 1 km^{2} (0.386 sq mi or 247 acres) and river estuaries.

Estancarbon (French pronunciation: [ɛstɑ̃kaʁbɔ̃]; Occitan: Estanhcarbon) is a commune in the Haute-Garonne department in southwestern France.

== Population ==
Historical population
Year	Pop.	±% p.a.
1968	313	—
1975	398	+3.49%
1982	465	+2.25%
1990	509	+1.14%
1999	530	+0.45%
2007	553	+0.53%
2012	613	+2.08%
2017	606	−0.23%
2023	612	+0.16%
Source: INSEE

== See also ==
- Communes of the Haute-Garonne department
