= Labarthe-Inard =

- Commune
- Location of Labarthe-Inard
- Location within France Location within Occitanie
- Coordinates: 43°06′33″N 0°50′20″E
- Country: France
- Region: Occitania
- Department: Haute-Garonne
- Arrondissement: Saint-Gaudens
- Canton: Saint-Gaudens

Government
  - Mayor (2020–2026): Jacques Albenque
- Area^{1}: 9.97 km^{2} (3.85 sq mi)
- Elevation: 320 m (1,050 ft)
- Highest elevation: 374 m (1,227 ft)
- Lowest elevation: 308 m (1,010 ft)
- Population (2023): 871
  - Density: 87.4/km^{2} (226/sq mi)
- Time zone: UTC+01:00 (CET)
  - Summer (DST): UTC+02:00 (CEST)
- INSEE/Postal code: 31246 /31800
- ^{1} French Land Register data, which excludes lakes, ponds, glaciers > 1 km^{2} (0.386 sq mi or 247 acres) and river estuaries.

Labarthe-Inard (French pronunciation: [labaʁt inaʁ]; Occitan: Era Barta d'Inard) is a commune in the Haute-Garonne department in southwestern France.

== Population ==
Historical population
Year	Pop.	±% p.a.
1968	559	—
1975	590	+0.77%
1982	614	+0.57%
1990	762	+2.74%
1999	781	+0.27%
2007	829	+0.75%
2012	903	+1.72%
2017	852	−1.16%
2023	871	+0.37%
Source: INSEE

== See also ==
Communes of the Haute-Garonne department
