= Martres-Tolosane =

- Commune
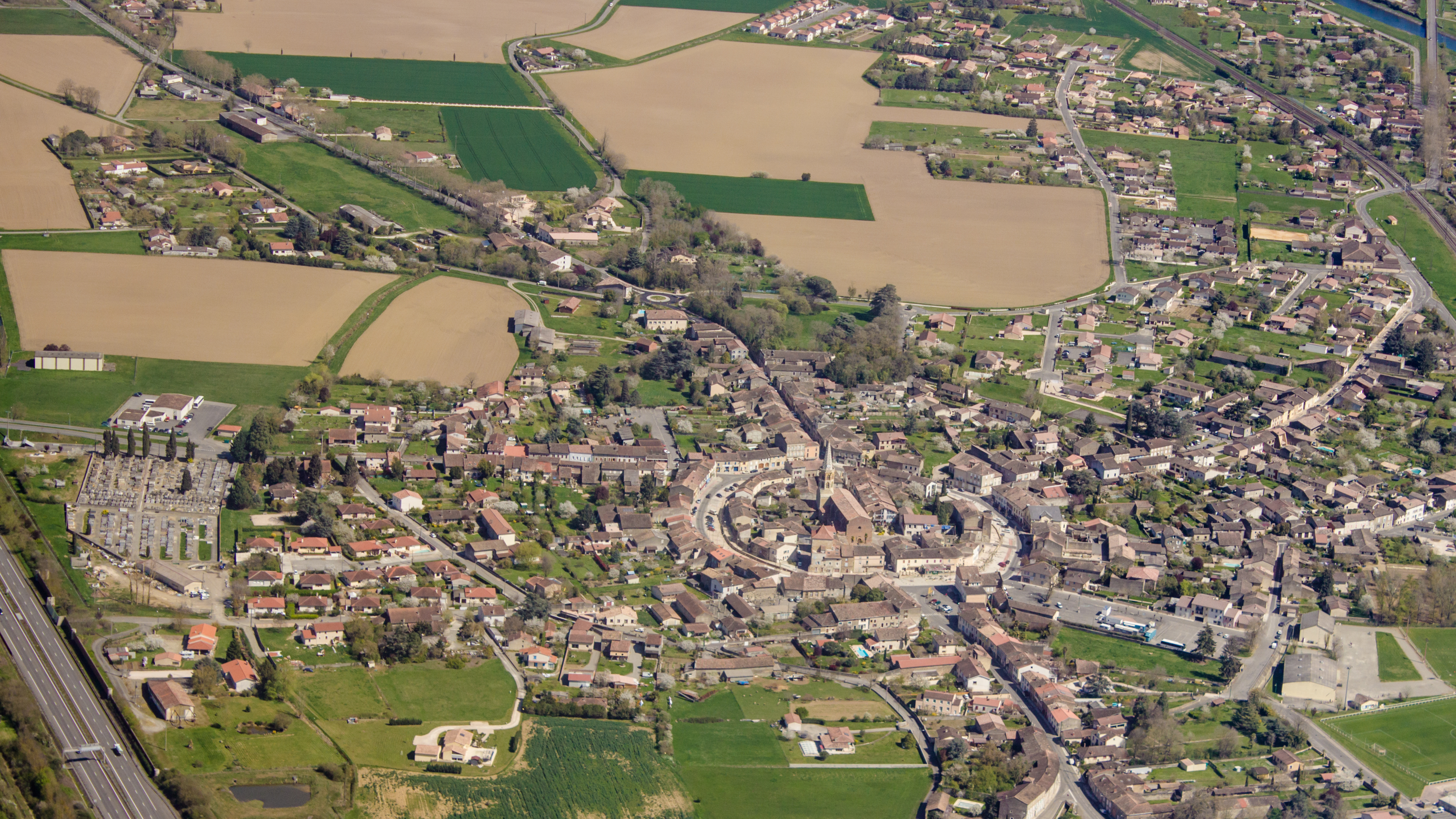
- Martres-Tolosane with the central circulade

- Coat of arms
- Location of Martres-Tolosane
- Location within France Location within Occitanie
- Coordinates: 43°11′59″N 1°00′42″E
- Country: France
- Region: Occitania
- Department: Haute-Garonne
- Arrondissement: Muret
- Canton: Cazères

Government
  - Mayor (2020–2026): Loïc Gojard
- Area^{1}: 23.52 km^{2} (9.08 sq mi)
- Elevation: 268 m (879 ft)
- Highest elevation: 488 m (1,601 ft)
- Lowest elevation: 236 m (774 ft)
- Population (2023): 2,387
  - Density: 101.5/km^{2} (262.9/sq mi)
- Time zone: UTC+01:00 (CET)
  - Summer (DST): UTC+02:00 (CEST)
- INSEE/Postal code: 31324 /31220
- ^{1} French Land Register data, which excludes lakes, ponds, glaciers > 1 km^{2} (0.386 sq mi or 247 acres) and river estuaries.

Martres-Tolosane (French pronunciation: [maʁtʁ tɔlozan]; Occitan: Martras Tolosana) is a commune in the Haute-Garonne department, Southwestern France. The town is a circulade indicating that it had been a fortified village during the middle ages. Martres-Tolosane station has rail connections to Toulouse, Pau and Tarbes.

The commune is listed as a Village étape.

== Geography ==
The commune is bordered by nine other communes: Terrebasse and Sana to the north, Mondavezan to the northeast, Palaminy to the east, Mauran across the river Garonne to the southeast, Roquefort-sur-Garonne to the south across the river Garonne to the south, Boussens to the southwest, Le Fréchet to the east, and finally by Marignac-Laspeyres to the northwest.

The river Garonne flows through the commune, forming a border between Mauran and Roquefort-sur-Garonne.

== History ==
The Roman villa of Chiragan was built on the bank of the Garonne, in the reign of Augustus, on the road from Toulouse to Lugdunum Convenarum and onward to Dax. The villa grew in size and importance in the second and third centuries, with lands stretching several kilometers around. When the villa was abandoned, some of its stones were used to used to build the citadel of Angonia probably during the Umayyad invasion of Gaul in the early 8th century. Around the citadel, a fortified village grew up.

Remains of an early Christian necropolis have been discovered in the town and it seems likely that this is where the name Martes-Tolosane comes from. Martres (or regional variations such as martory, martrois, etc) was an early medieval word of latin origin indicating a cemetery or the resting place of christian martyrs.

In the Middle Ages, the village was guarded by towers, a donjon, surrounding wall, moat and drawbridges. The fortified village (which dates from the beginning of the 13th century) had two ramparts 5 m high. Martres-Tolosane was home to a significant local nobility and numerous businesses and craftsmen who made this place prosper for centuries, including earthenware workshops from the 18th century.

== The legend of Saint Vidian ==
The patron saint of the town is Saint Vidian. According to the local legend he was a knight of Charlemagne who led an army that defeated the invading Saracens in a battle outside Angonia but was wounded and, when bathing his wounds after the battle, was surprised and killed by an enemy detachment. This is celebrated every year in Martres-Tolosane with a festival combining religious elements with a re-enactment of the battle.

The historicity of the legend is questionable. By the time of Charlemagne, the Muslim forces had been driven from France and there is no evidence they were previously near Martres-Tolosane. The tale of Saint Vidian, essentially unknown outside the local region, is remarkably similar to the story of the Chevalier Vivien in the Geste de Garin de Monglane song cycle, which dates back to the early 12th century at least and is set in the region around Arles. Research has dated the local legend to around 1764.

== Eglise Saint Vidian ==
The origins of the church are unclear, but they may date back to a Roman building, which later became a paleo-Christian necropolis. Saint Vidian is said to be buried in a dedicated chapel in the church, which also contains several early Christian sarcophagi.

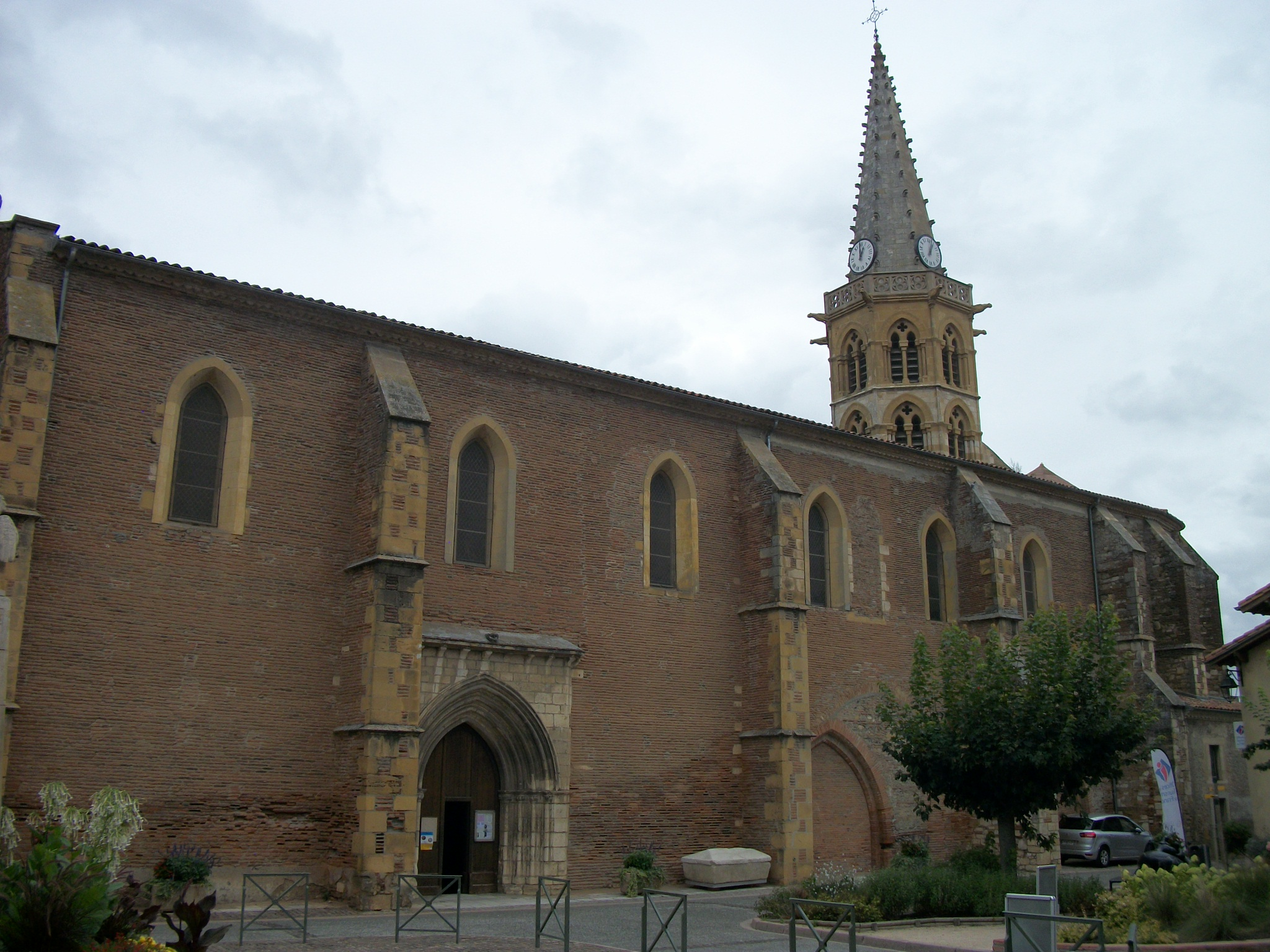
Eglise Saint Vidian

In the 10th century, a priory and its sanctuary dependent on the abbey of Saint-Sernin de Toulouse were established in the town. The Romanesque church of the priory, which had become in poor condition, was demolished in the 13th century and rebuilt of brick. It was consecrated in 1309 and was dependent on the diocese of Rieux created by Pope John XXII of Avignon in 1317.

There was considerable damage to the church following the French Revolution, but restoration commenced in 1814.

== Population ==
Historical population
Year	Pop.	±% p.a.
1968	2,024	—
1975	1,909	−0.83%
1982	1,925	+0.12%
1990	1,929	+0.03%
1999	1,687	−1.48%
2007	2,200	+3.37%
2012	2,223	+0.21%
2017	2,383	+1.40%
2023	2,387	+0.03%
Source: INSEE

== See also ==
- Communes of the Haute-Garonne department
