= Alan, Haute-Garonne =

Alan
- Commune
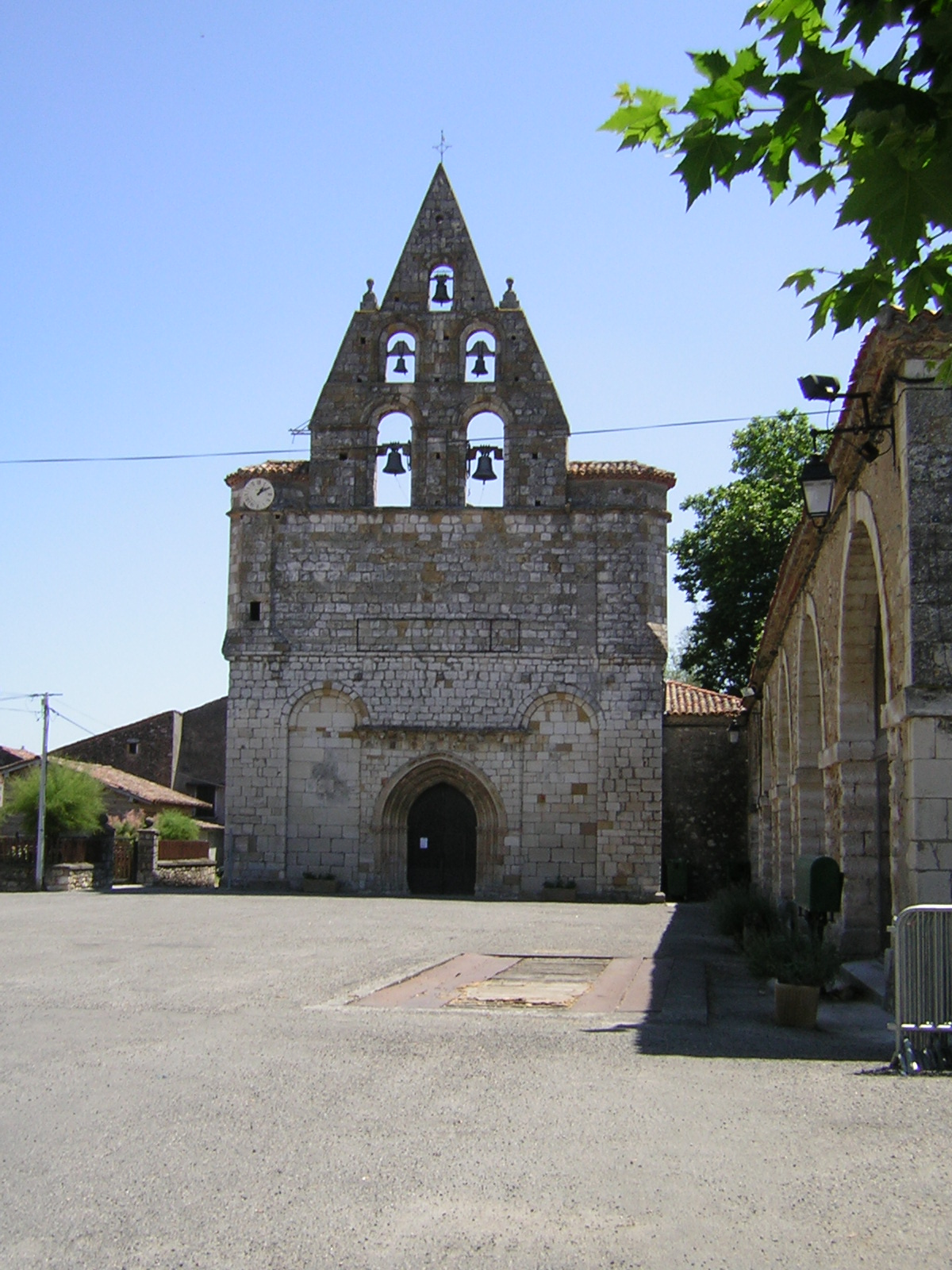
- The church in Alan

- Coat of arms
- Location of Alan
- Location within France Location within Occitanie
- Coordinates: 43°13′50″N 0°56′25″E
- Country: France
- Region: Occitania
- Department: Haute-Garonne
- Arrondissement: Saint-Gaudens
- Canton: Cazères
- Intercommunality: Cœur et Coteaux du Comminges

Government
  - Mayor (2020–2026): Francis Beausor
- Area^{1}: 11.29 km^{2} (4.36 sq mi)
- Elevation: 378 m (1,240 ft)
- Highest elevation: 520 m (1,710 ft)
- Lowest elevation: 271 m (889 ft)
- Population (2023): 292
  - Density: 25.9/km^{2} (67.0/sq mi)
- Time zone: UTC+01:00 (CET)
  - Summer (DST): UTC+02:00 (CEST)
- INSEE/Postal code: 31005 /31420
- ^{1} French Land Register data, which excludes lakes, ponds, glaciers > 1 km^{2} (0.386 sq mi or 247 acres) and river estuaries.

Alan (French pronunciation: [alɑ̃]) is a commune in the Haute-Garonne department in southwestern France.

== Geography ==
The commune is bordered by seven other communes: Bachas to the north, Terrebasse to the northeast, Marignac-Laspeyres to the east, Le Fréchet to the south, Aurignac to the southwest, Montoulieu-Saint-Bernard to the west, and finally by Benque to the northwest.

== History ==
The village was established in the 11th century as a sauveté by the Knights of St John. In the 13th century (1272), it was transformed into a bastide by Eustache de Beaumarchais. Shortly afterwards Bertrand de Miramont, Bishop of the Comminges, established a residence there, expanded by subsequent bishops to become their winter palace. The Bishops of Comminges ruled Alan without a feudal system, but with the peasants paying their tax to the church. In 1498, the county of Comminges passed to the King of France and taxes were collected by the Estates of Comminges (a type of local parliament). After the French revolution, the palace and its gardens were declared national property and divided into eleven parts. Gradually these fell into disuse and the building was abandoned in the 19th century, although it has been extensively restored by recent owners.

An earlier text dates the establishment of Alan, Haute-Garonne and its name back to the fifth century AD during the reign of Constantius III and his campaigns against the Visigoths in northern Hispania. In 414 AD, the forces of Visigothic King Athaulf along with their Alan allies marched into southern Gaul in search of a place to settle. They gained control of Narbonne, Toulouse and Bordeaux before facing a stalemate at Bazas. At that point, Count Paulinus of Pella, who happened to a friend of the Alan leader, and who was inside the besieged town with his family, managed to persuade the Alan chiefs to change their allegiance from the Visigoths and help successfully break the siege of Bazas. In exchange Paulinus promised the Alans land on which to settle. The Goths, deprived of their Alan allies broke off the siege and through constant pressure by forces of Constantius, fled from southern Gaul, crossing the Pyrenees and entering Hispania in 415 AD. Following this victory, emperor Constantius, as part of his plan to confine the Goths in Hispania, fulfilled the agreement between Paulinus and the Alans, arranging for the division of land between Toulouse and the Mediterranean, enabling the Alans to control coastal roads particularly the Via Domitia connecting Gaul with Hispania. In this area, Alan military settlers or their descendants appear to have given their name to the towns including Alan but also Alénya, Alaigne and Lanet.

== Population ==
The inhabitants of the commune are called Alanais in French.

Historical population
Year	Pop.	±% p.a.
1968	267	—
1975	228	−2.23%
1982	259	+1.84%
1990	276	+0.80%
1999	299	+0.89%
2007	305	+0.25%
2012	316	+0.71%
2017	305	−0.71%
2023	292	−0.72%
Source: INSEE

== See also ==
- Communes of the Haute-Garonne department
