= Marignac-Laspeyres =

- Commune
- Coat of arms
- Location of Marignac-Laspeyres
- Location within France Location within Occitanie
- Coordinates: 43°12′57″N 0°57′58″E
- Country: France
- Region: Occitania
- Department: Haute-Garonne
- Canton: Cazères

Government
  - Mayor (2020–2026): Jean-Luc Lasserre
- Area^{1}: 12.41 km^{2} (4.79 sq mi)
- Elevation: 360 m (1,180 ft)
- Highest elevation: 530 m (1,740 ft)
- Lowest elevation: 285 m (935 ft)
- Population (2023): 194
  - Density: 15.6/km^{2} (40.5/sq mi)
- Time zone: UTC+01:00 (CET)
  - Summer (DST): UTC+02:00 (CEST)
- INSEE/Postal code: 31318 /31220
- ^{1} French Land Register data, which excludes lakes, ponds, glaciers > 1 km^{2} (0.386 sq mi or 247 acres) and river estuaries.

Marignac-Laspeyres (French pronunciation: [maʁiɲak laspɛʁ]; Occitan: Marinhac e eras Pèiras) is a commune in the Haute-Garonne department in southwestern France.

== Geography ==
The commune is bordered by four other communes: Terrebasse to the north, Alan to the west, Le Fréchet to the southwest, and finally by Martres-Tolosane to the southeast.

== Population ==
Historical population
Year	Pop.	±% p.a.
1968	140	—
1975	101	−4.56%
1982	102	+0.14%
1990	123	+2.37%
1999	111	−1.13%
2007	154	+4.18%
2012	206	+5.99%
2017	218	+1.14%
2023	194	−1.93%
Source: INSEE

== See also ==
- Communes of the Haute-Garonne department
