= Boussens, Haute-Garonne =

Boussens
- Commune
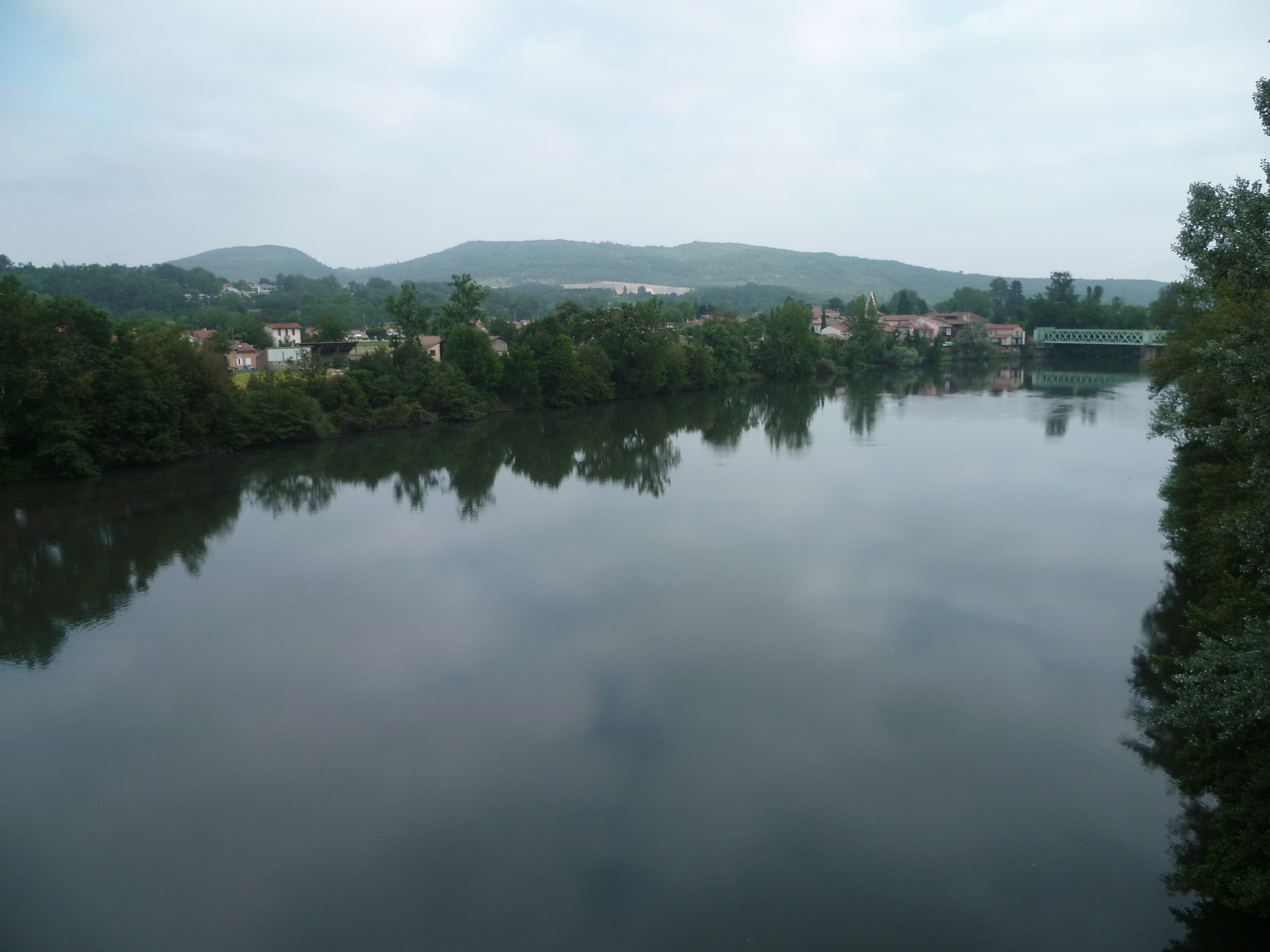
- The Garonne

- Coat of arms
- Location of Boussens
- Location within France Location within Occitanie
- Coordinates: 43°10′36″N 0°58′25″E
- Country: France
- Region: Occitania
- Department: Haute-Garonne
- Arrondissement: Muret
- Canton: Cazères

Government
  - Mayor (2020–2026): Christian Sans
- Area^{1}: 4.33 km^{2} (1.67 sq mi)
- Elevation: 271 m (889 ft)
- Highest elevation: 403 m (1,322 ft)
- Lowest elevation: 257 m (843 ft)
- Population (2023): 1,135
  - Density: 262/km^{2} (679/sq mi)
- Time zone: UTC+01:00 (CET)
  - Summer (DST): UTC+02:00 (CEST)
- INSEE/Postal code: 31084 /31360
- ^{1} French Land Register data, which excludes lakes, ponds, glaciers > 1 km^{2} (0.386 sq mi or 247 acres) and river estuaries.

Boussens (French pronunciation: [busɛ̃s]; Occitan: Bossens) is a commune in the Haute-Garonne department in southwestern France.

== Geography ==
The commune is bordered by four other communes: Martres-Tolosane to the north, Le Fréchet to the northwest, Mancioux to the southwest, and finally by Roquefort-sur-Garonne across the river Garonne to the east.

The river Garonne flows through the commune, forming a border with Roquefort-sur-Garonne.

== Population ==
Historical population
| Year | Pop. | ±% p.a. |
|---|---|---|
| 1968 | 734 | — |
| 1975 | 698 | −0.72% |
| 1982 | 725 | +0.54% |
| 1990 | 797 | +1.19% |
| 1999 | 833 | +0.49% |
| 2007 | 1,033 | +2.73% |
| 2012 | 1,097 | +1.21% |
| 2017 | 1,074 | −0.42% |
| 2023 | 1,135 | +0.92% |
Source: INSEE

== International relationships ==
Boussens is twinned with Boussens in Switzerland, and these two villages has similar name, and become a sister city in 1987.

== Transport ==
Boussens station has rail connections to Toulouse, Pau and Tarbes.

== See also ==
- Communes of the Haute-Garonne department
