= Boussens =

Boussens may refer to:

- Boussens, Vaud, Switzerland
- Boussens, Haute-Garonne, France
