= Cazères station =

Railway station in Cazères, France

Cazères
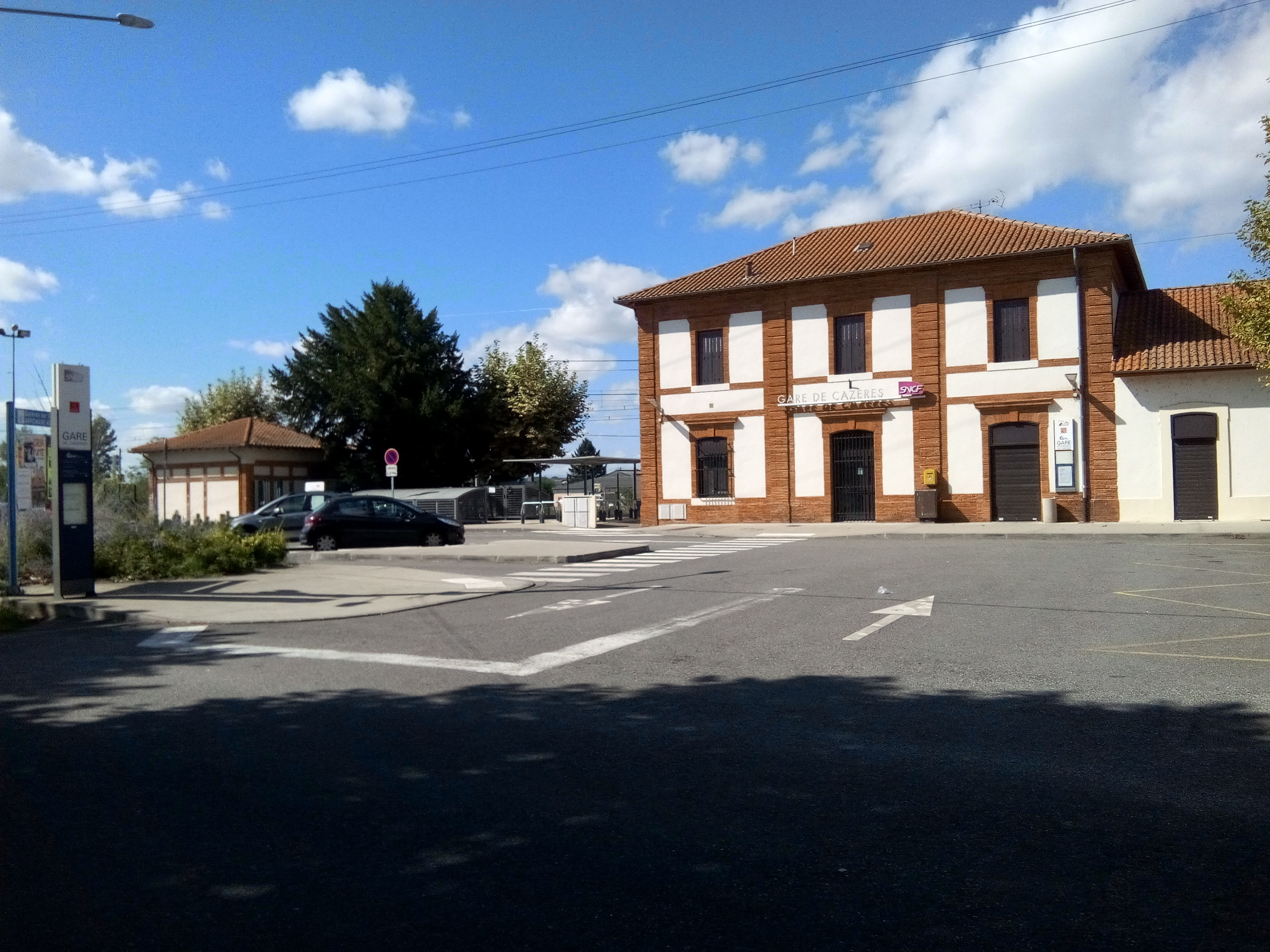
- Cazères railway station

General information
- Location: Cazères, Haute-Garonne, Occitanie, France
- Coordinates: 43°12′46″N 1°05′00″E
- Line: Toulouse–Bayonne railway
- Platforms: 2
- Tracks: 2

Other information
- Station code: 87611079

History
- Opened: 9 June 1862

Services
Preceding station	TER Occitanie	Following station
Martres-Tolosane towards Pau	15	Carbonne towards Toulouse
Location

Cazères is a railway station in Cazères, Occitanie, France. The station is on the Toulouse–Bayonne railway. The station is served by TER (local) services operated by the SNCF. The fastest journey time by train from Cazères to Toulouse-Matabiau station is 39 minutes.

== Train services ==
The following services currently call at Cazères:

- local service (TER Occitanie) Toulouse–Saint-Gaudens–Tarbes–Pau
