= Montoulieu-Saint-Bernard =

- Commune
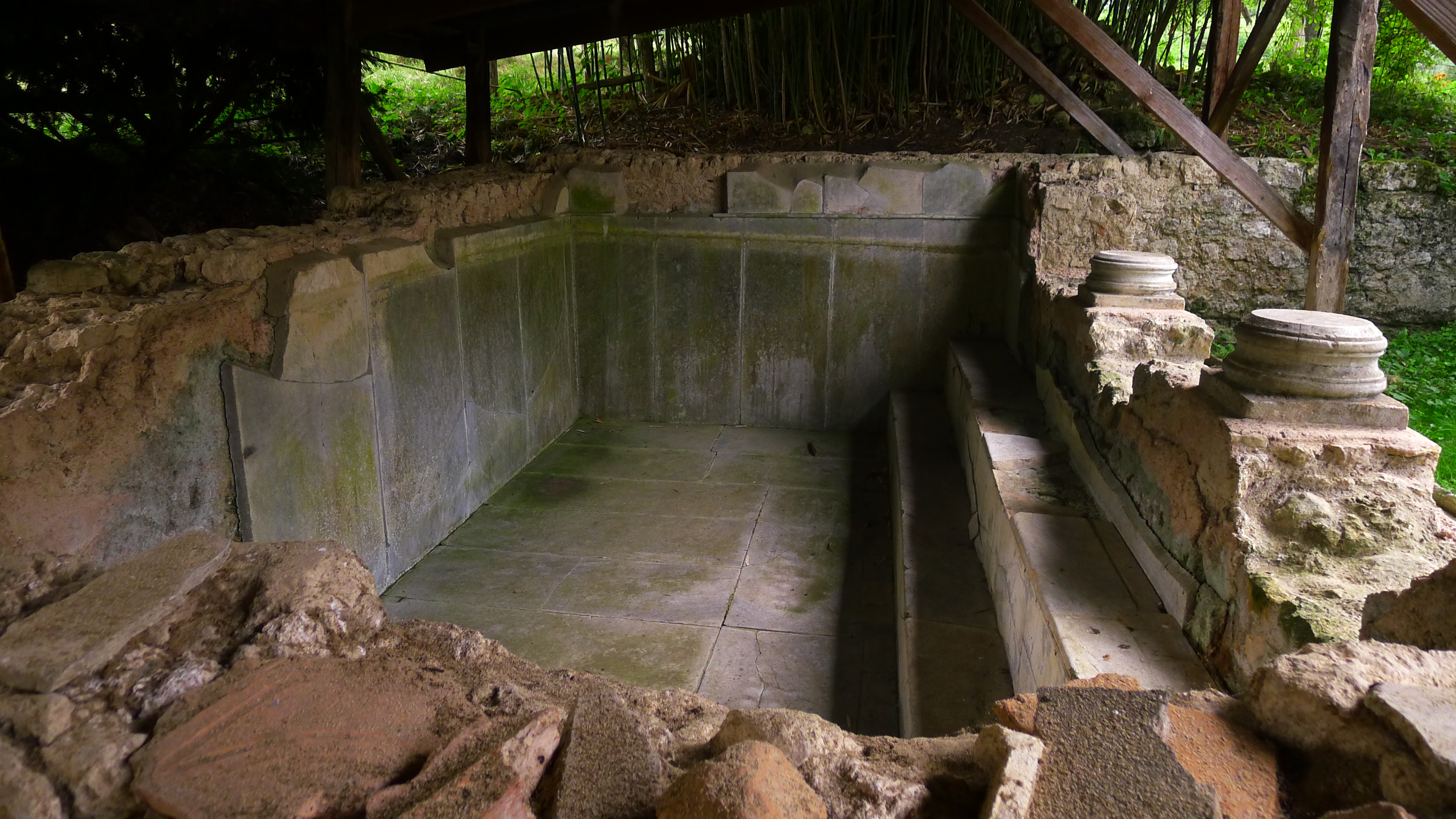
- Baths of the Roman villa
- Location of Montoulieu-Saint-Bernard
- Location within France Location within Occitanie
- Coordinates: 43°14′06″N 0°54′33″E
- Country: France
- Region: Occitania
- Department: Haute-Garonne
- Arrondissement: Saint-Gaudens
- Canton: Cazères
- Intercommunality: Cœur et Coteaux du Comminges

Government
  - Mayor (2020–2026): Camille Sors
- Area^{1}: 4.83 km^{2} (1.86 sq mi)
- Elevation: 350 m (1,150 ft)
- Highest elevation: 467 m (1,532 ft)
- Lowest elevation: 276 m (906 ft)
- Population (2023): 230
  - Density: 48/km^{2} (120/sq mi)
- Time zone: UTC+01:00 (CET)
  - Summer (DST): UTC+02:00 (CEST)
- INSEE/Postal code: 31386 /31420
- ^{1} French Land Register data, which excludes lakes, ponds, glaciers > 1 km^{2} (0.386 sq mi or 247 acres) and river estuaries.

Montoulieu-Saint-Bernard (French pronunciation: [mɔ̃tuljø sɛ̃ bɛʁnaʁ]; Occitan: Montoliu de Sent Bernat) is a commune in the Haute-Garonne department of southwestern France.

In 1957 the remains of a Gallo-Roman bath were discovered on a farm in the commune. The excavations carried out revealed a small, remarkably preserved thermal complex composed of a colonade vestibule, a swimming pool, and 3 more or less warm rooms (caldarium, tepidarium and frigidarium). Coins, fragments of amphorae and ceramics date its occupation in the 4th century AD. It is likely that this complex belonged to a villa in the large agricultural estate of the Roman villa of Chiragan.

== Population ==
Historical population
Year	Pop.	±% p.a.
1968	106	—
1975	106	+0.00%
1982	111	+0.66%
1990	149	+3.75%
1999	153	+0.29%
2007	169	+1.25%
2012	194	+2.80%
2017	213	+1.89%
2023	230	+1.29%
Source: INSEE

== See also ==
- Communes of the Haute-Garonne department
