= Martres-Tolosane station =

Railway station in Martres-Tolosane, France

Martres-Tolosane
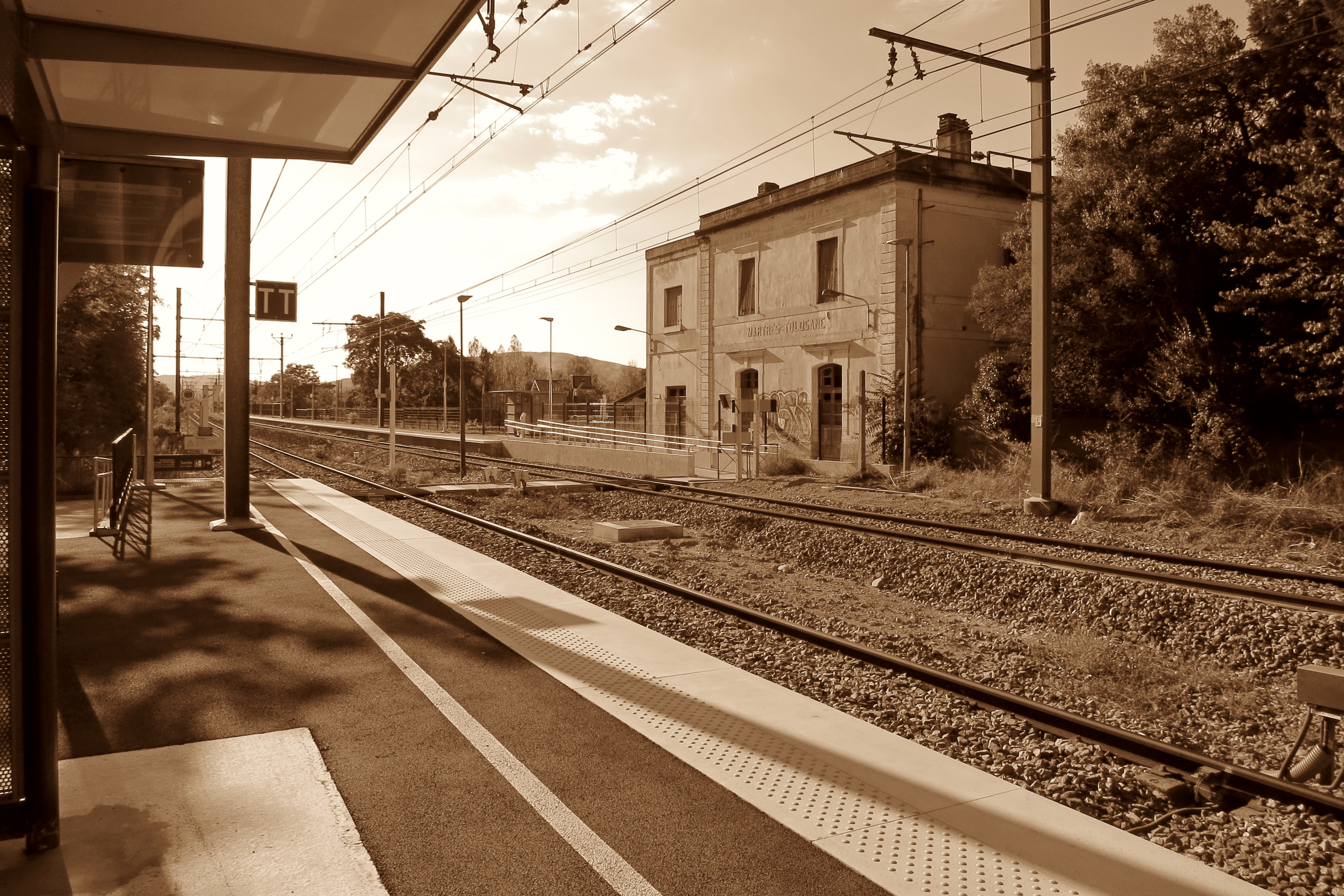
- Martres-Tolosane railway station

General information
- Location: Martres-Tolosane, Haute-Garonne, Occitanie, France
- Coordinates: 43°11′46″N 1°00′59″E
- Line: Toulouse–Bayonne railway
- Platforms: 2
- Tracks: 2

Other information
- Station code: 87611087

History
- Opened: 9 June 1862

Services
Preceding station	TER Occitanie	Following station
Boussens towards Pau	15	Cazères towards Toulouse
Location

The Martres-Tolosane station (French: gare de Martres-Tolosane) is a railway station in Martres-Tolosane, Occitania, France. The station is on the Toulouse–Bayonne railway. The station is served by TER (local) services operated by the SNCF.

== Train services ==
The following services currently call at Martres-Tolosane:

- local service (TER Occitanie) Toulouse–Saint-Gaudens–Tarbes–Pau
