= Boussens station =

Railway station in Boussens, France

Boussens
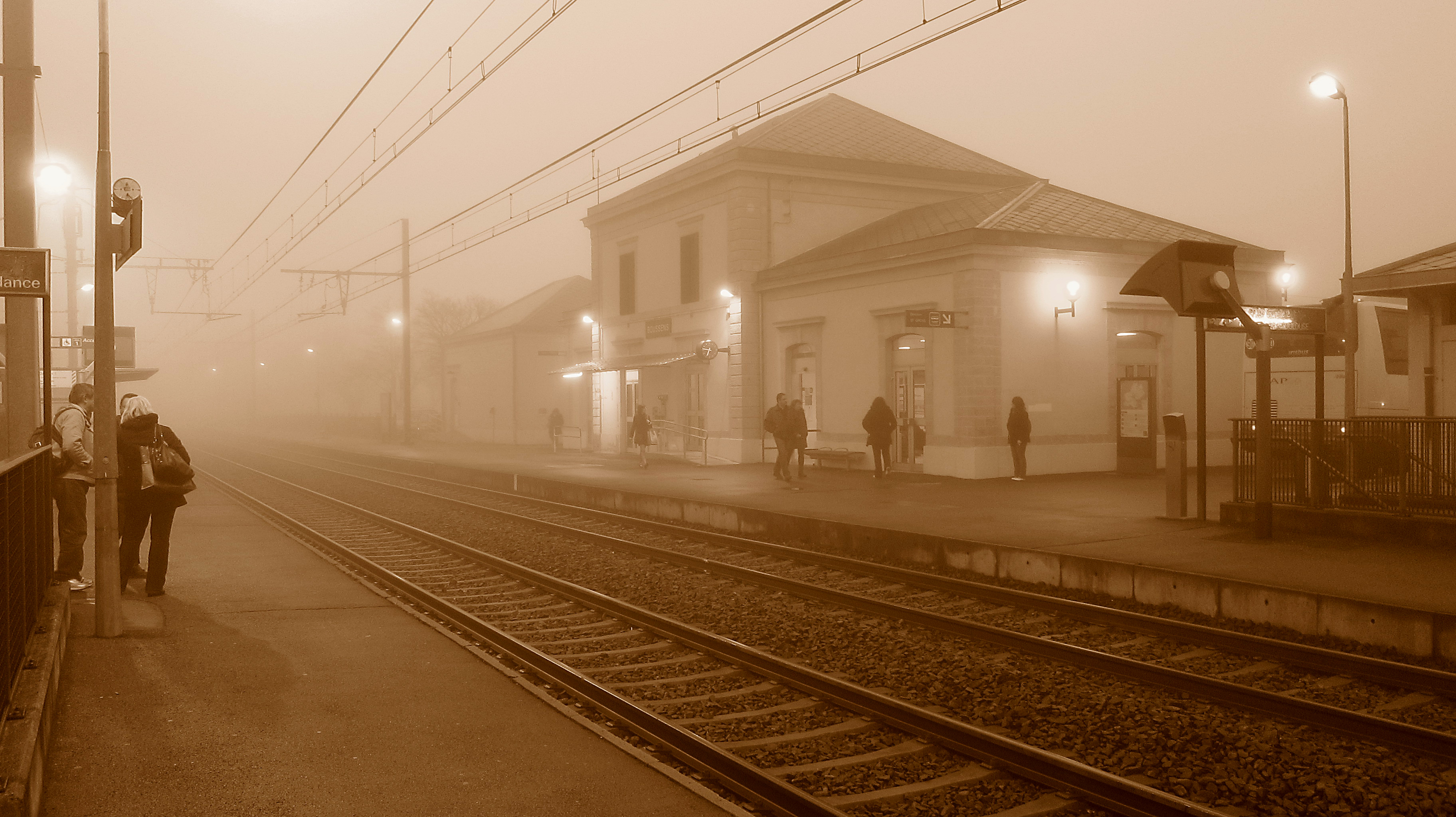
- Boussens railway station

General information
- Location: Boussens, Haute-Garonne, Occitanie, France
- Coordinates: 43°10′44″N 0°58′18″E
- Line: Toulouse–Bayonne railway
- Platforms: 3
- Tracks: 6

Other information
- Station code: 87611095

History
- Opened: 9 June 1862

Services
Preceding station	TER Occitanie	Following station
Saint-Martory towards Pau	15	Martres-Tolosane towards Toulouse
Location

Boussens is a railway station in Boussens, Occitanie, France. The station is on the Toulouse–Bayonne railway line and the former Boussens-Saint-Girons railway, which closed in 1990. The station is served by TER (local) services operated by the SNCF.

== Train services ==
The following services currently call at Boussens:

- local service (TER Occitanie) Toulouse–Saint-Gaudens–Tarbes–Pau

== Bus Services ==
Bus connections are available at the station to Saint-Girons.
