= Carbonne station =

Railway station in Occitanie, France

Carbonne
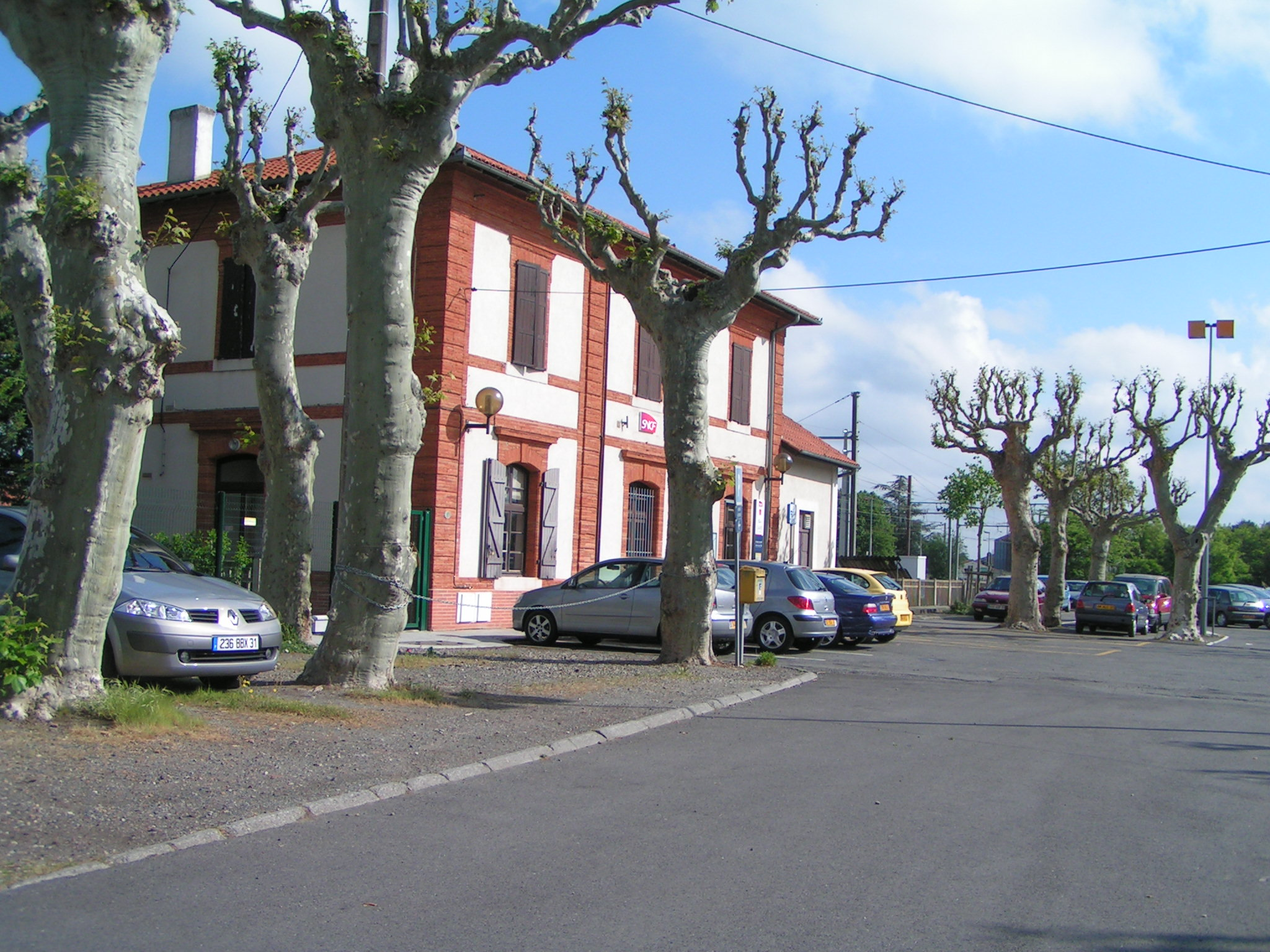
- Carbonne railway station

General information
- Location: Carbonne, Haute-Garonne, Occitanie, France
- Coordinates: 43°17′52″N 1°12′42″E
- Line: Toulouse–Bayonne railway
- Platforms: 2
- Tracks: 4

Other information
- Station code: 87611061

History
- Opened: 9 June 1862

Services
Preceding station	TER Occitanie	Following station
Cazères towards Pau	15	Longages–Noé towards Toulouse
Location

Carbonne is a railway station in Carbonne, Occitanie, France. The station is located on the Toulouse–Bayonne railway. The station is served by TER (local) services operated by the SNCF.

== Train services ==
The following services currently call at Carbonne:

- local service (TER Occitanie) Toulouse – Saint-Gaudens – Tarbes – Pau

== Bus Services ==
Bus connections are available at the station to Montesquieu-Volvestre.
