= Roman villa of Chiragan =

Roman villa in Martres-Tolosane, France

- Villa romaine de de Chiragan
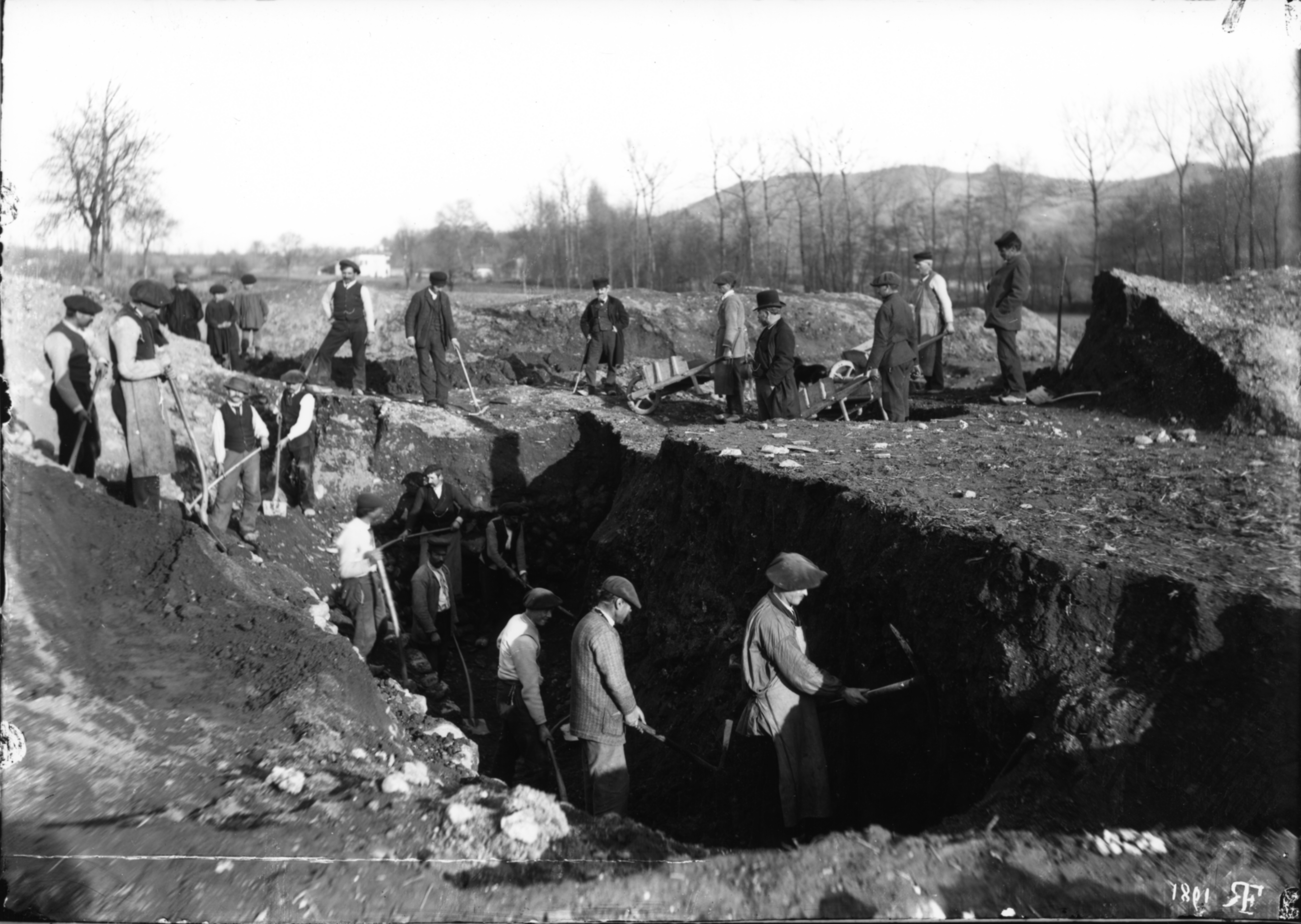
- Albert Lebègue excavation in the villa of Chiragan in Martres-Tolosane (1890)

- Location within Occitanie
- Type: villa
- Cultures: Roman
- Location: Martres-Tolosane

History
- Built: 1st century
- Abandoned: 4th century

Site notes
- Area: 16
- Excavation dates: 1826–1830, 1890–1891, 1894–1895, 1897–1899, 1905, 1920, 1930, 1969
- Archaeologists: Alexandre Du Mège, Albert Lebègue, A. Ferré, Léon Joulin
- Condition: ruined

Monument historique
- Designated: 1998

The Roman villa of Chiragan is a Roman villa located in Martres-Tolosane (France).

The villa was located on the banks of the river Garonne, on the road to Toulouse and was occupied between the 1st and 4th centuries. The buildings spread over an area of 16 hectares and consisted of both the agricultural buildings of a latifundium and the owner's residence, with a monumental portico, numerous garden areas and private baths.

The residential areas were decorated with marble reliefs depicting the Labours of Hercules, dated to the 3rd century, or with clipei (shields) with images of deities. There were also numerous statues, copies of Greek originals made in Rome, and a gallery of portraits of emperors and other personalities. The sculptures are now in the Saint-Raymond Museum in Toulouse. There were also decorations with acanthus swirls mixed with small animals.

After the first discoveries in the 16th century, due to the digging of a canal, excavations in the villa took place in the years 1826–1830 and again in 1897–1899.

== Occupation of the villa ==
Alexandre Du Mège, the director of excavations at Chiragan in the 1840s, thought that the villa was the ancient city of Calagorris mentioned in the Antonine Itinerary and that the rich findings pointed to an imperial palace. On the other hand, Léon Joulin, the author of large-scale excavations carried out at the end of the 19th century, suggested that the site was occupied by the procurators in charge of the administration of the imperial lands, which would explain the importance accorded to the figure of the emperor in the villa. Another hypothesis, put forward by Jean-Charles Balty, sees it as the property of Maximian and thus effectively an imperial villa at the end of the third century.

=== Construction stages ===
The villa, inhabited between the 1st and 4th centuries, was built in three distinct phases.

The first villa, of modest dimensions, dates back to the time of Augustus. Even so, it nevertheless included thermal baths and a peristyle. At the beginning of the 2nd century, the villa was expanded. During Trajan's time, the building included an atrium and two peristyles. The maximum expansion of the villa dates from the Antonine dynasty, covering an area equal to one third of the Villa Hadriana in Tivoli.

The digs of Léon Joulin revealed the devastation from the time of the 5th century barbarian invasions.

After being abandoned, the site was used for centuries as a quarry for building materials, although around the middle of the 17th century the ruins still seemed important. Canon Lebret's testimony in 1692 attests that the walls were 3 to 4 meters high. During a visit to the site in 1812, Alexandre Du Mège testified to the presence of walls 1–2 metres high. The remnants of the walls were destroyed in the mid-19th century as a result of the development of intensive agriculture.

== Excavations ==
Occasional discoveries of sculptures have been documented since the 17th century. In the 17th and 18th centuries, especially around the years 1630–1640, sculptural elements were discovered on the site of the villa. The first findings in the 17th century were made by digging a canal in 1612. At the end of the century, the bishop of Rieux had the marbles found at Martres-Tolosane placed in the episcopal palace. During the 18th century, further occasional discoveries took place.

Yet it is not until the 19th century that the villa undergoes systematic archaeological excavation. The opportunity arose from a flood of the river that runs alongside the site: following a heavy storm, the water and the rainfall brought to light the remains of the villa on 23 May 1826. The mayor of Martres-Tolosane alerted the mayor of Toulouse, who commissioned Alexandre Du Mège, an inspector of antiquities, to carry out the excavations. Numerous sculptures are found which Du Mège reclaims. There are reportedly mosaics, hypocausts and traces of paintings on the lower part of the walls. Du Mège carries on his work until the July Revolution in 1830.

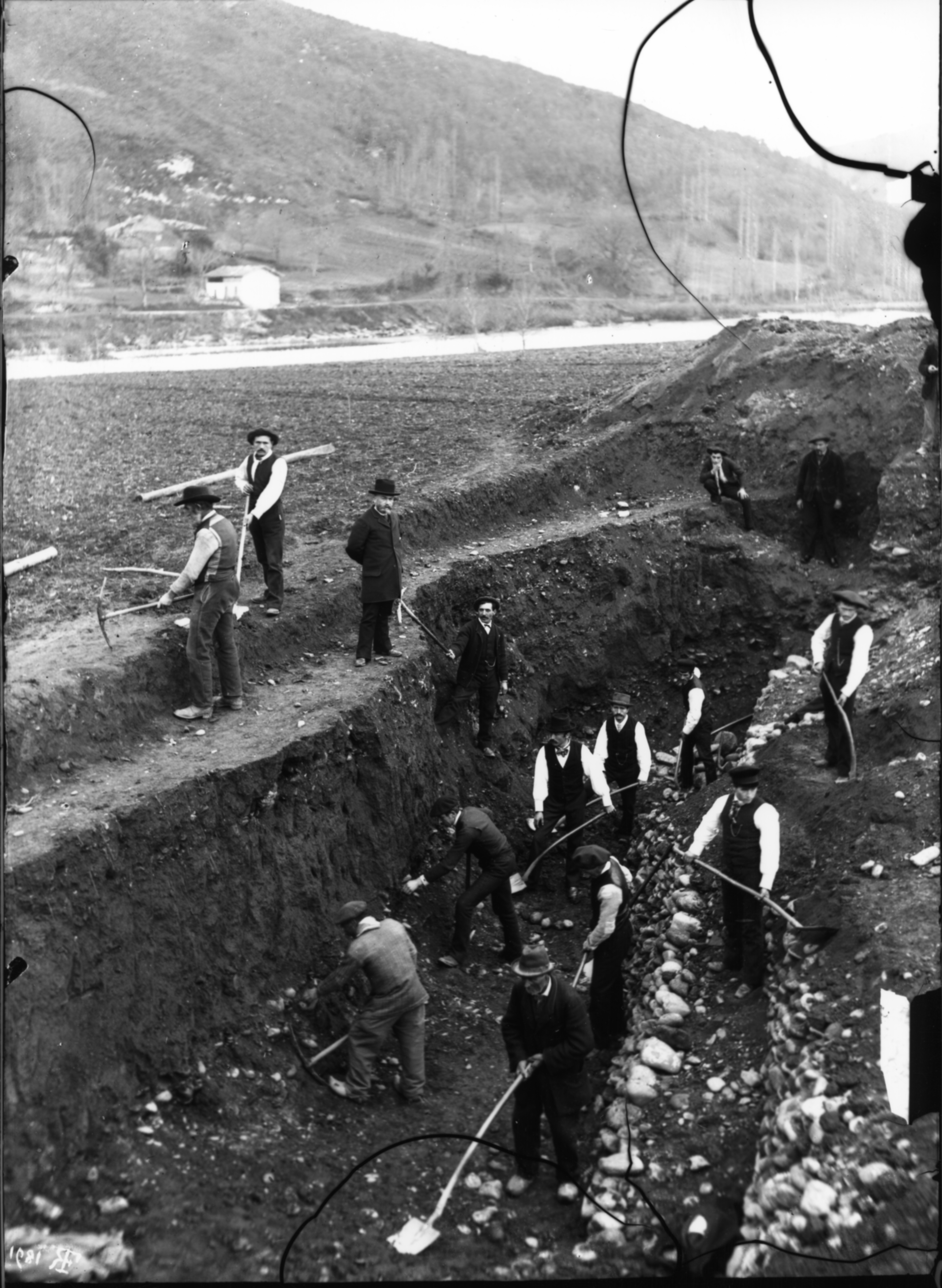
Albert Lebègue, director of the excavations in villa of Chiragan (1890–91).

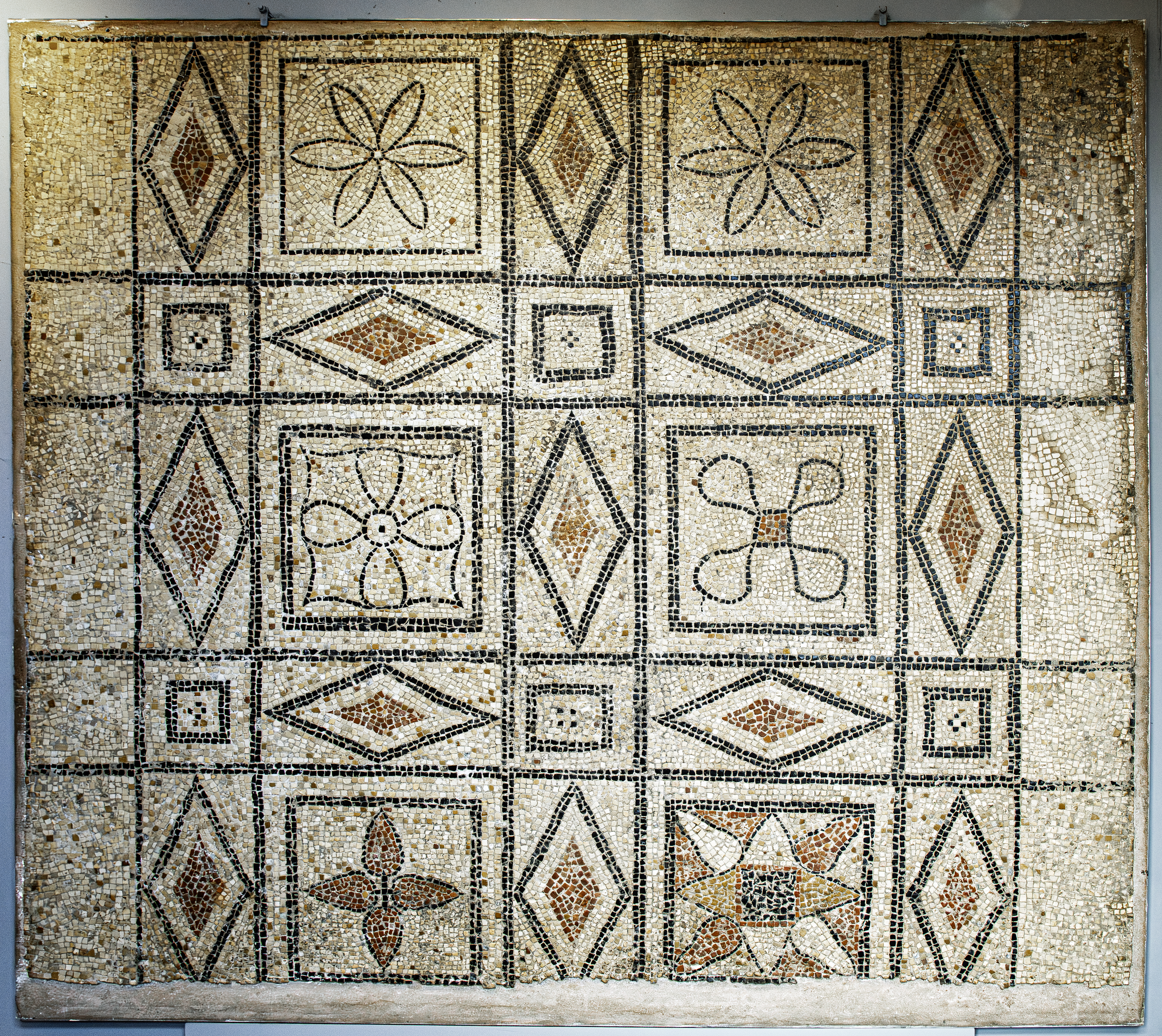
Mosaic from the Roman Villa of Chiragan - exhibited at the Saint-Raymond Museum in Toulouse

New excavations are carried out by the Société archéologique du Midi de la France from 1840 to 1842 and then from 1842 to 1848, to link the new findings to the areas cleared by Alexandre Du Mège. The archaeologists then focused their research to the east of Du Mège's excavations. These excavations revealed the existence of thermae, although they brought to light fewer objects than in the previous excavation campaigns.

The first archaeologists were interested in discovering elements of furniture. The interest in the architecture of the villa, perceptible from the 1840s onwards, was to grow until it became central to Léon Joulin's work at the turn of the 19th and 20th centuries.

Throughout the rest of the 19th century, archaeological objects continued to be found sporadically, but without an excavation campaign being organised. It was only at the end of the century, in the years 1890–91, that new excavations were entrusted to Albert Lebèque, an archaeologist, pupil of Emile Burnouf and trained at the French School of Athens. He then became professor of Greco-Roman antiquities at the University of Toulouse. After the scandals involving Du Mège about the commerce of falsified antiques, the aim of Lebèque's excavation campaign was to "dispel doubts" about the conduct of previous investigations, given the lack of confidence of the scientific community. The excavations confirmed the disruption of the site and the authenticity of the artefacts found by Du Mège, although in the end Lebègue mistrusted Du Mège's findings. Lebègue's death in 1894 put an end to the work.

Léon Joulin took charge of the work from 1897 to 1899, seconded by Abel Ferré, and carried out large-scale excavations financed by the State, the department and the town of Toulouse. His work was published in 1901.

Following most of the work carried out by his predecessors, he proposed a synthesis, based on an interpretation of the site considered in its context of the Martres-Tolosane plain. In particular, he drew up a plan of the compound, taken as a reference by later generations, in which he identified the estate as a vast villa extending over 16 hectares. The techniques used, based on the stratigraphy of the different periods of occupation, made him a pioneer of methodical archaeology.

After Joulin's work, other discoveries were made throughout the 20th century: in 1905, 1920 and 1930. During excavation work on the Palaminy canal, the aqueduct that supplied the villa was recovered.

== Description ==
The villa was located on the banks of the Garonne, near the road from Toulouse to Dax. The period of occupation goes between the 1st and 4th centuries. According to 19th-century authors, the residence was equipped with a jetty and a pier, which were destroyed by a flood.

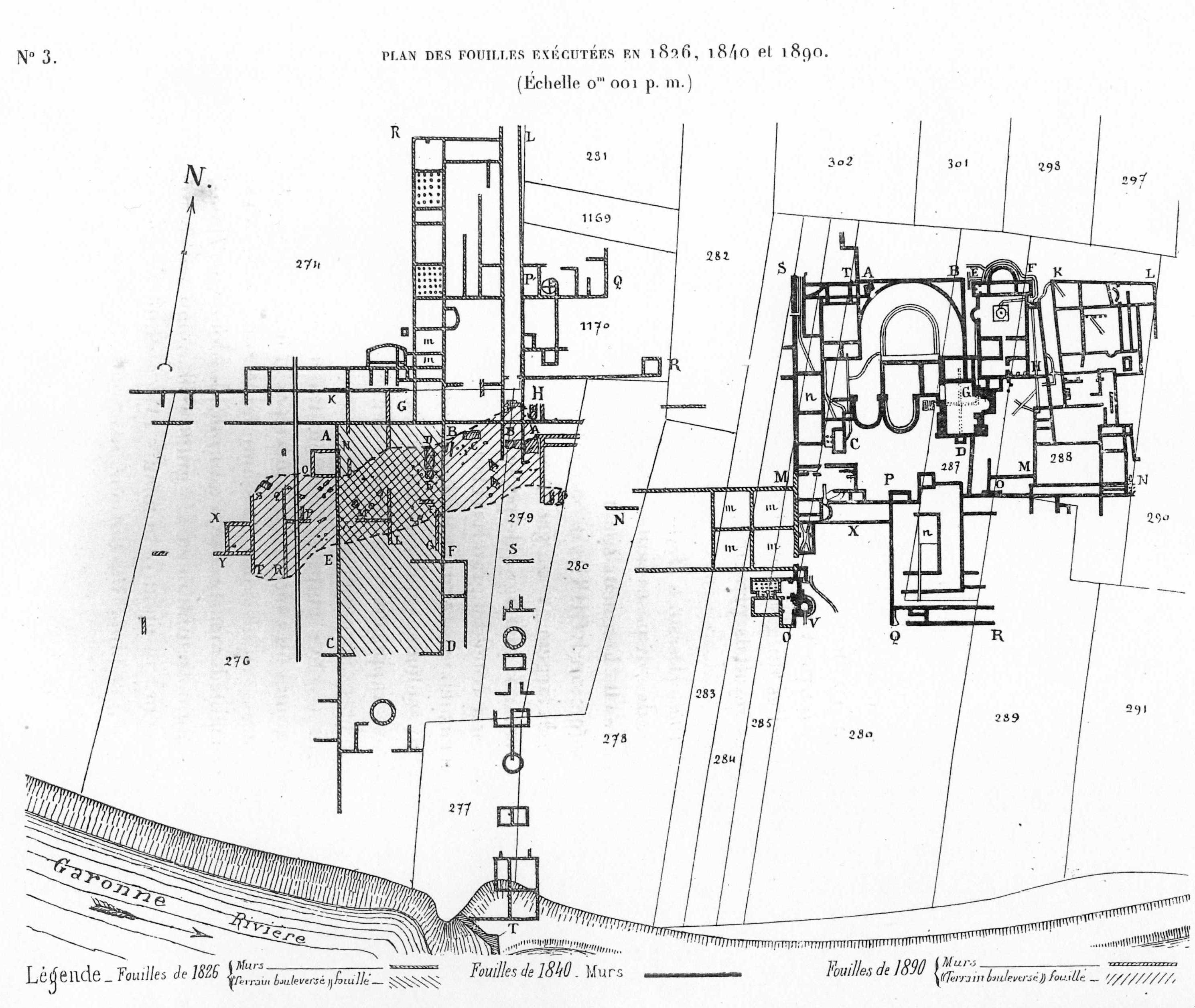
Joulin's map of the site (1901).

The 80 buildings that constituted the villa occupied an area of 16 hectares (40 acres). The total surface occupied by the buildings has been established by the latest archaeological research at 18000 square meters. These comprise both the elements necessary for the agricultural production of the rustic villa and the master's residence, with a monumental portico, numerous gardens, and private baths. A number of small houses were found between the main residence and the agricultural sector: they were homes for employees, as well as shops and workshops, and some animal shelters, grouped together in a small village.

The pars urbana of the main villa comprised dozens of rooms. The ground floor alone included more than 200 rooms and other facilities, parks, courtyards and several entrances.

The pars rustica, i.e. the agricultural buildings, were arranged in three rows and located within a 1500 m long enclosure. The buildings had an agricultural function, with stables, pigsties, granaries, etc. They also had a workshop function with the presence of weaving workshops and a foundry. All these structures (and the 400 or so people who worked and lived in them) had to manage an estate of more than 1 000 hectares.

== The archaeological findings ==
The first excavators were struck by the importance of the sculptures, the splendid marble decorations, including some 300 statues of very fine manufacture.

The residential buildings were decorated with marble reliefs depicting the labours of Hercules, dating from the 2nd century, and clipei depicting Roman deities. Furthermore, many statues have been unearthed: they are copies of Greek statues made in Rome, plus a gallery of portraits of emperors and other important figures of the Empire. The sculptures have been eventually transferred in the Saint-Raymond Museum in Toulouse.

Busts of Emperors

Septimius Severus

Trajan

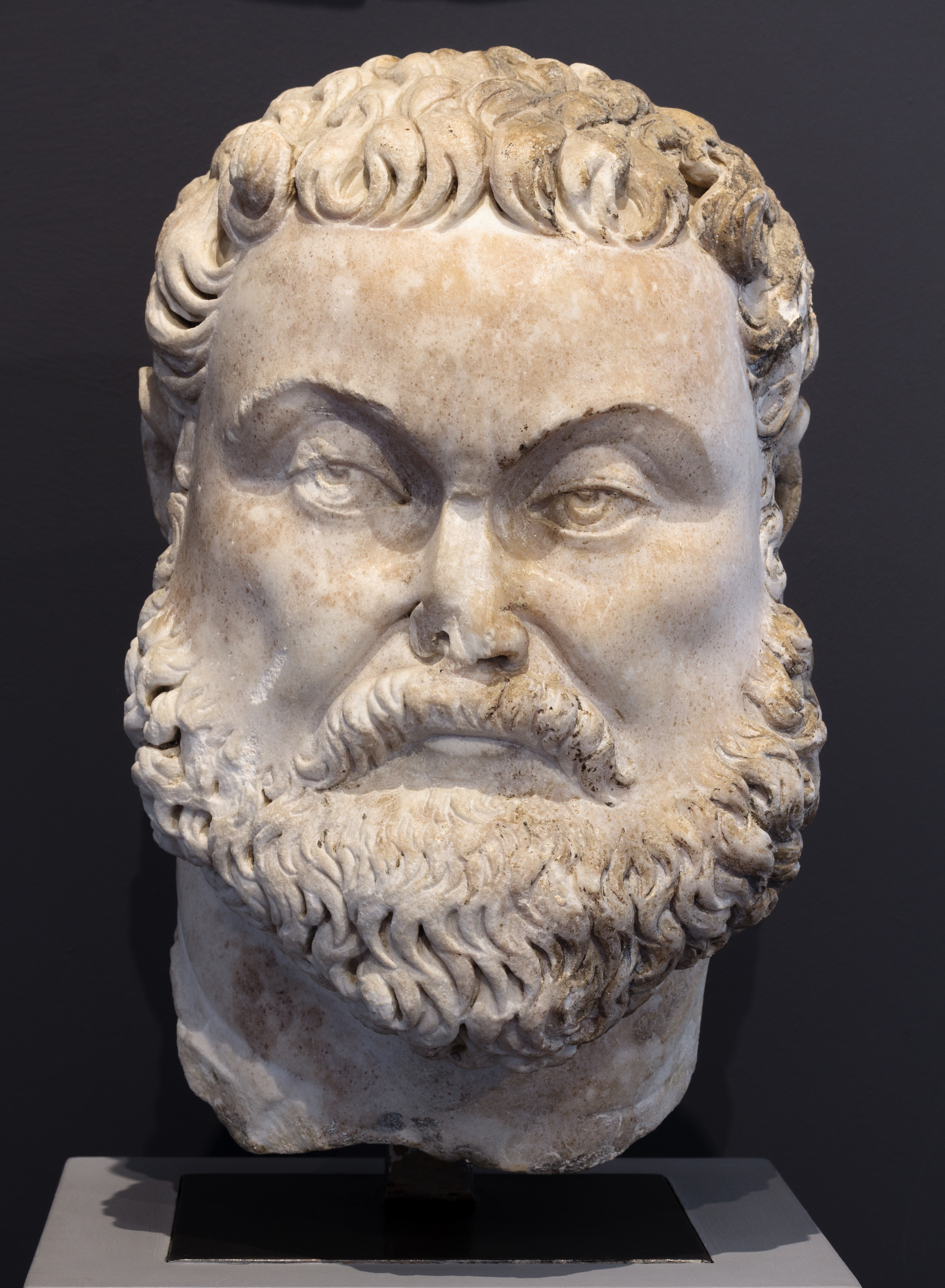
Maximian

Unknown person

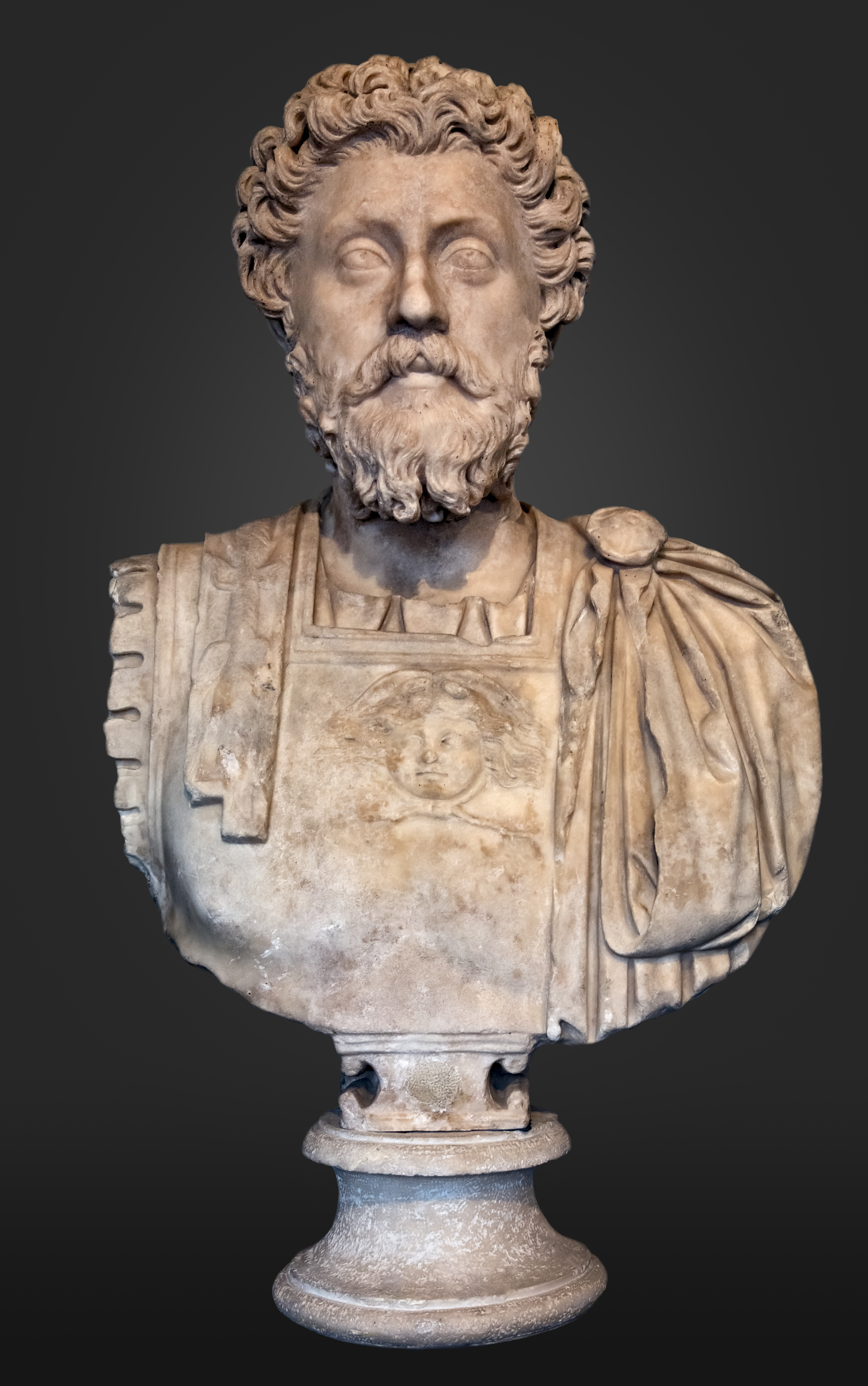
Marcus Aurelius
Clipei

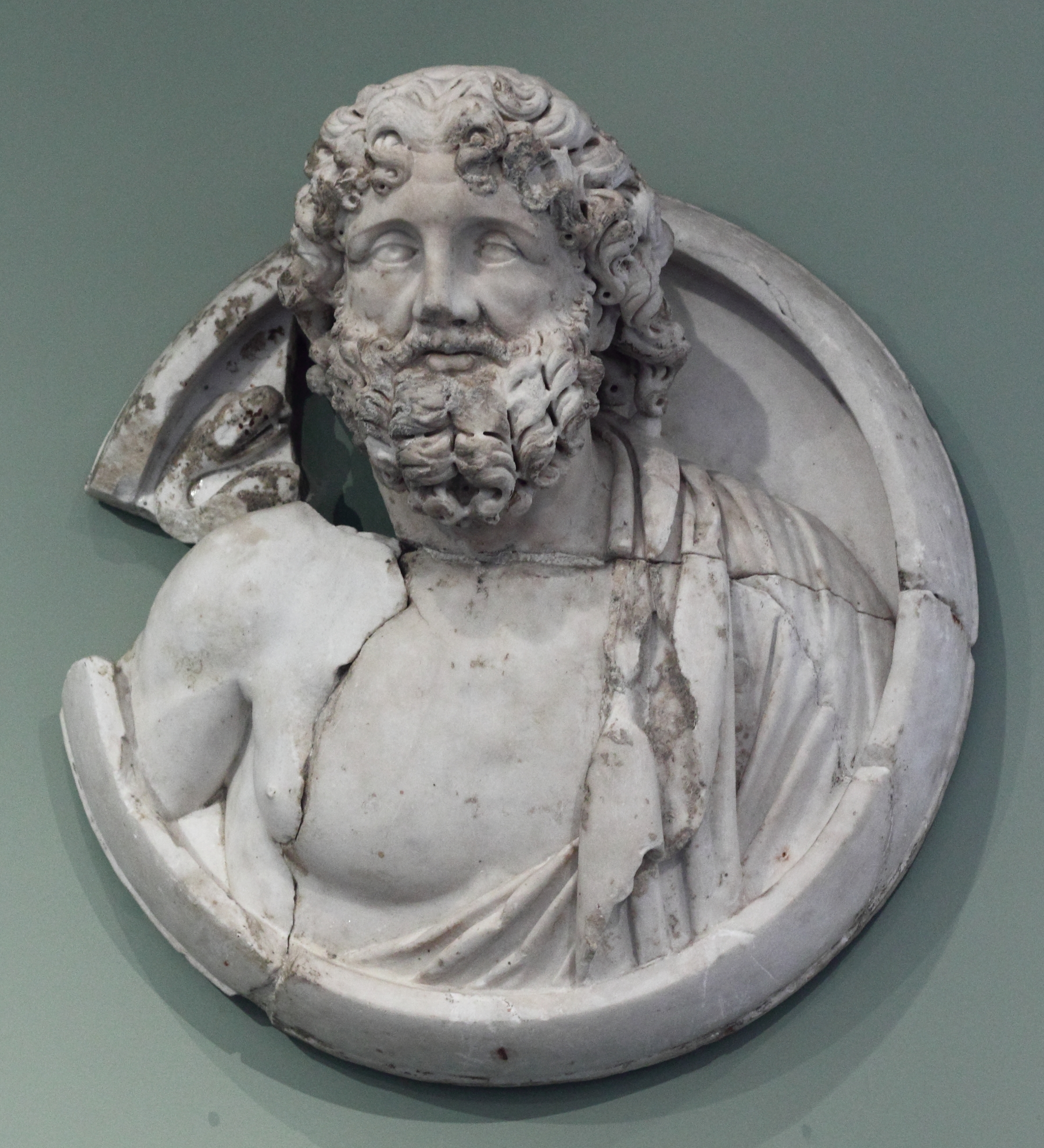
Asclepius

Attis

Hygieia

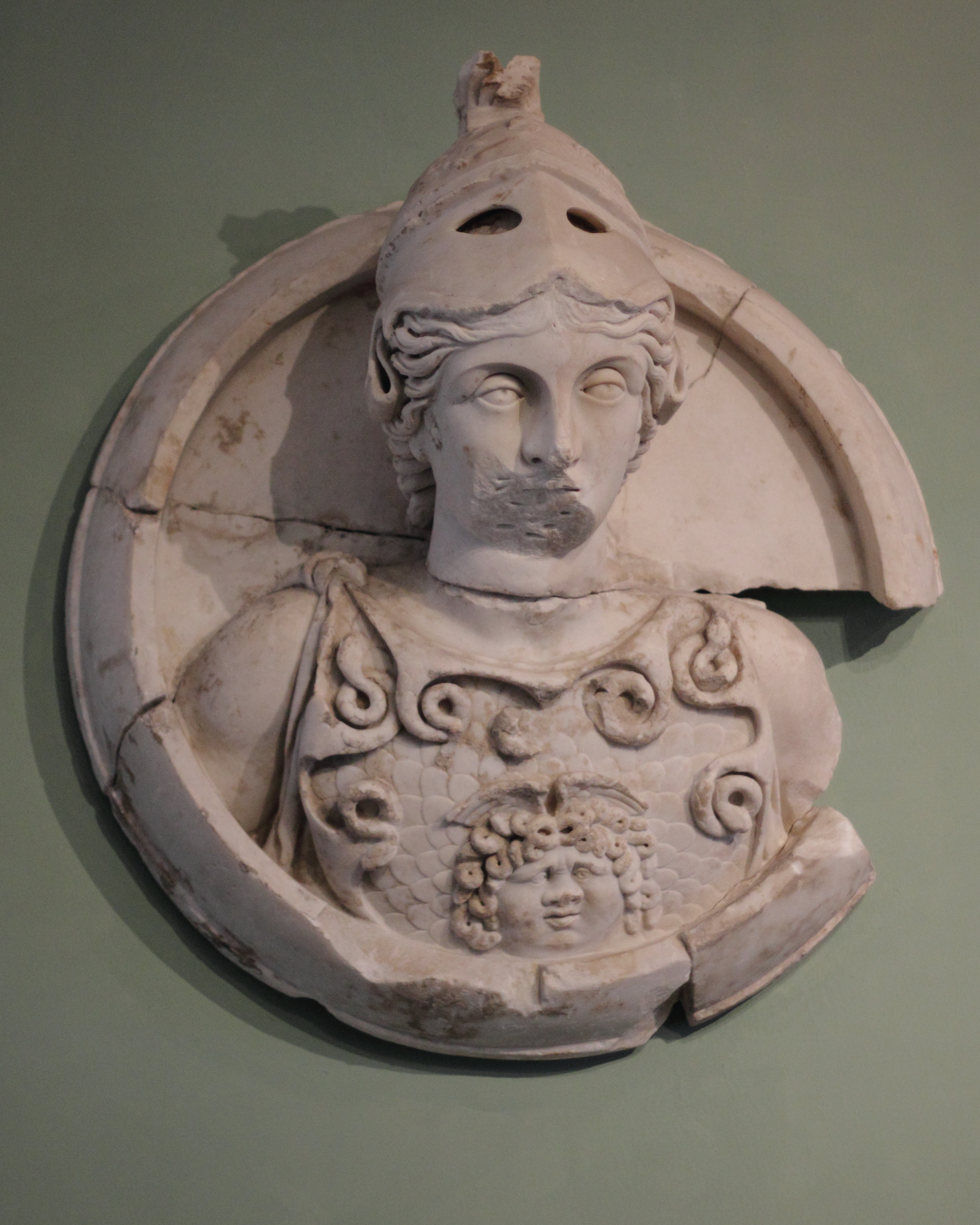
Minerva
The labours of Hercules

Augean stables

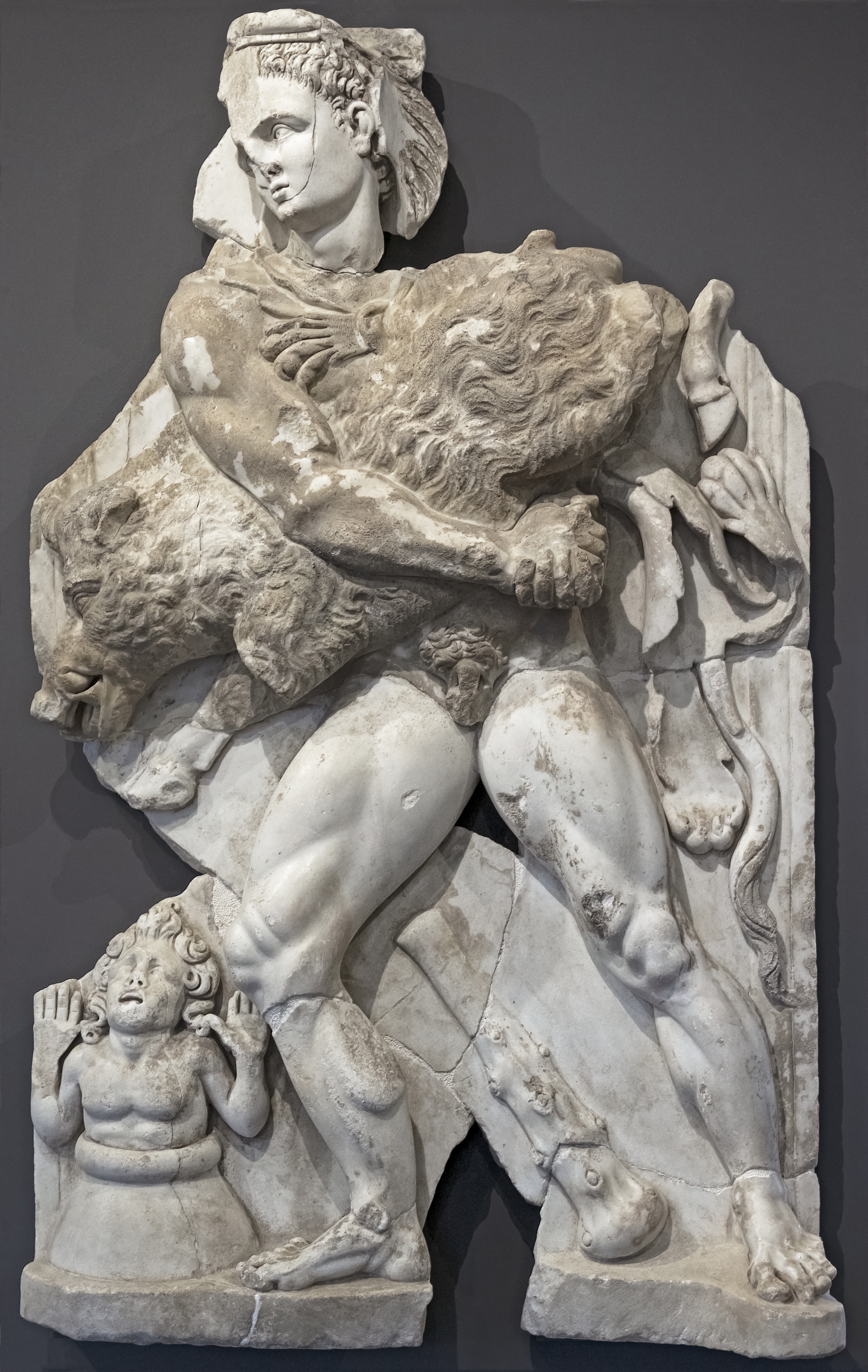
Erymanthian boar

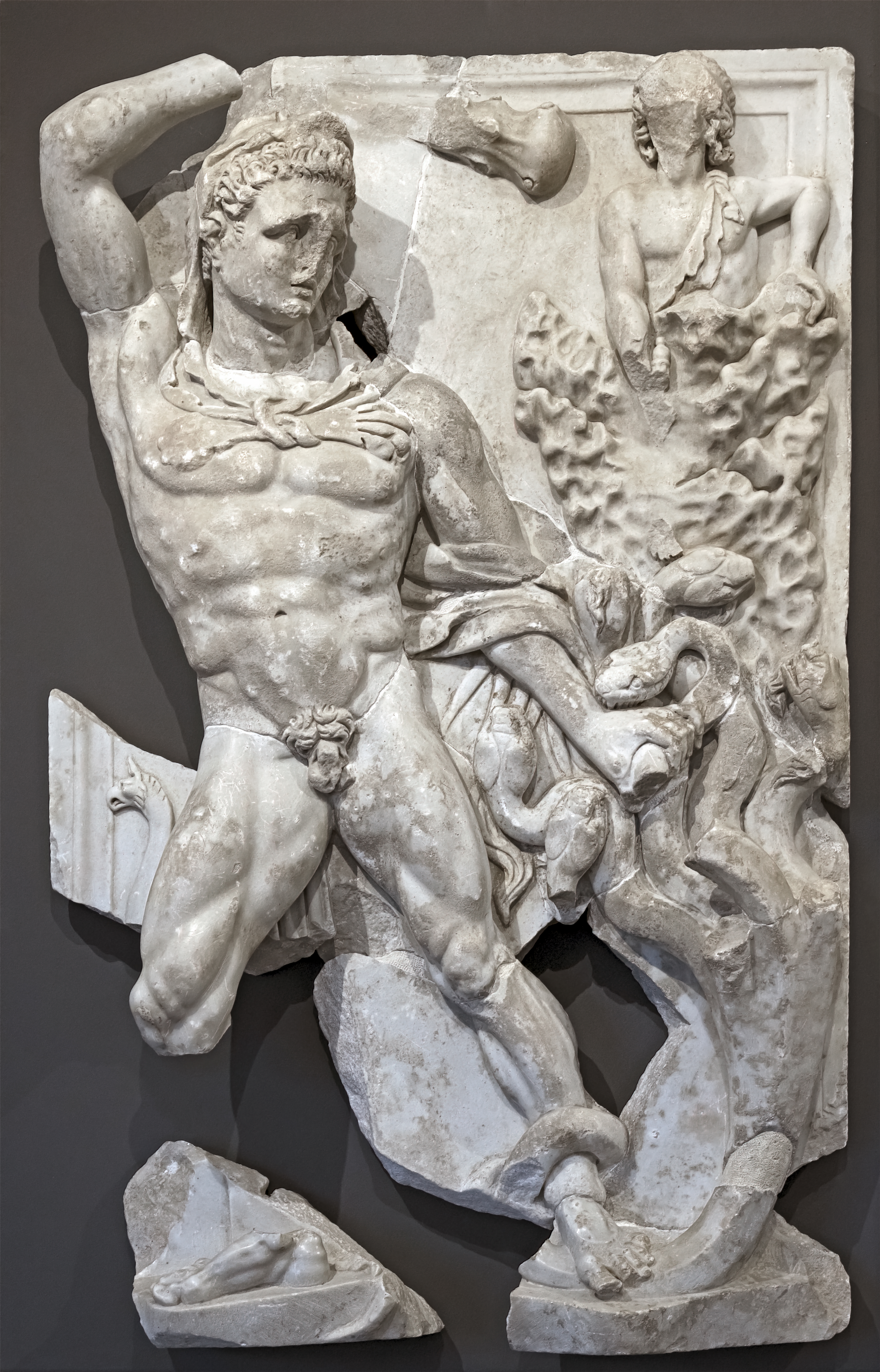
Hercules and Iolaus kill the Hydra

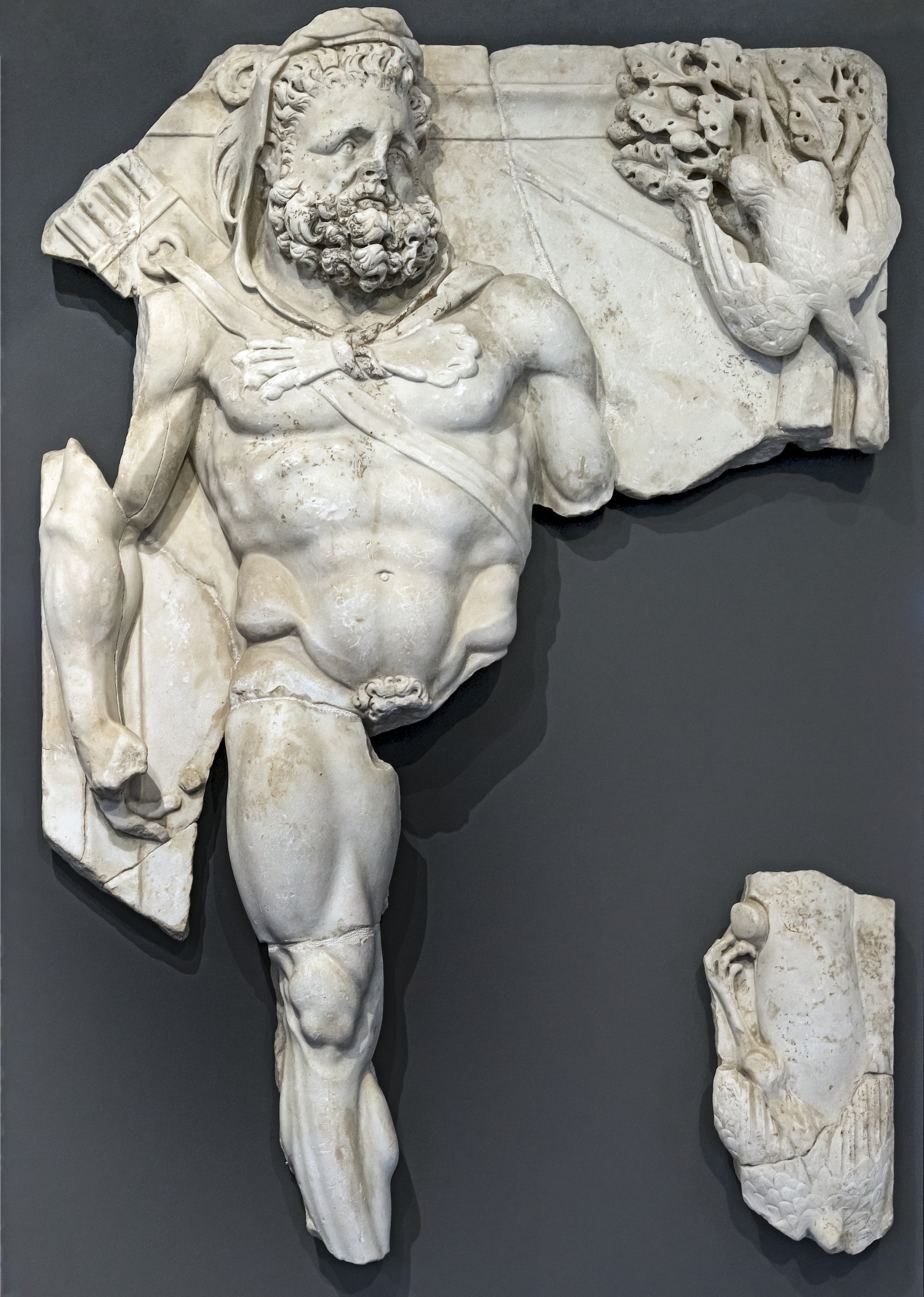
Stymphalian birds

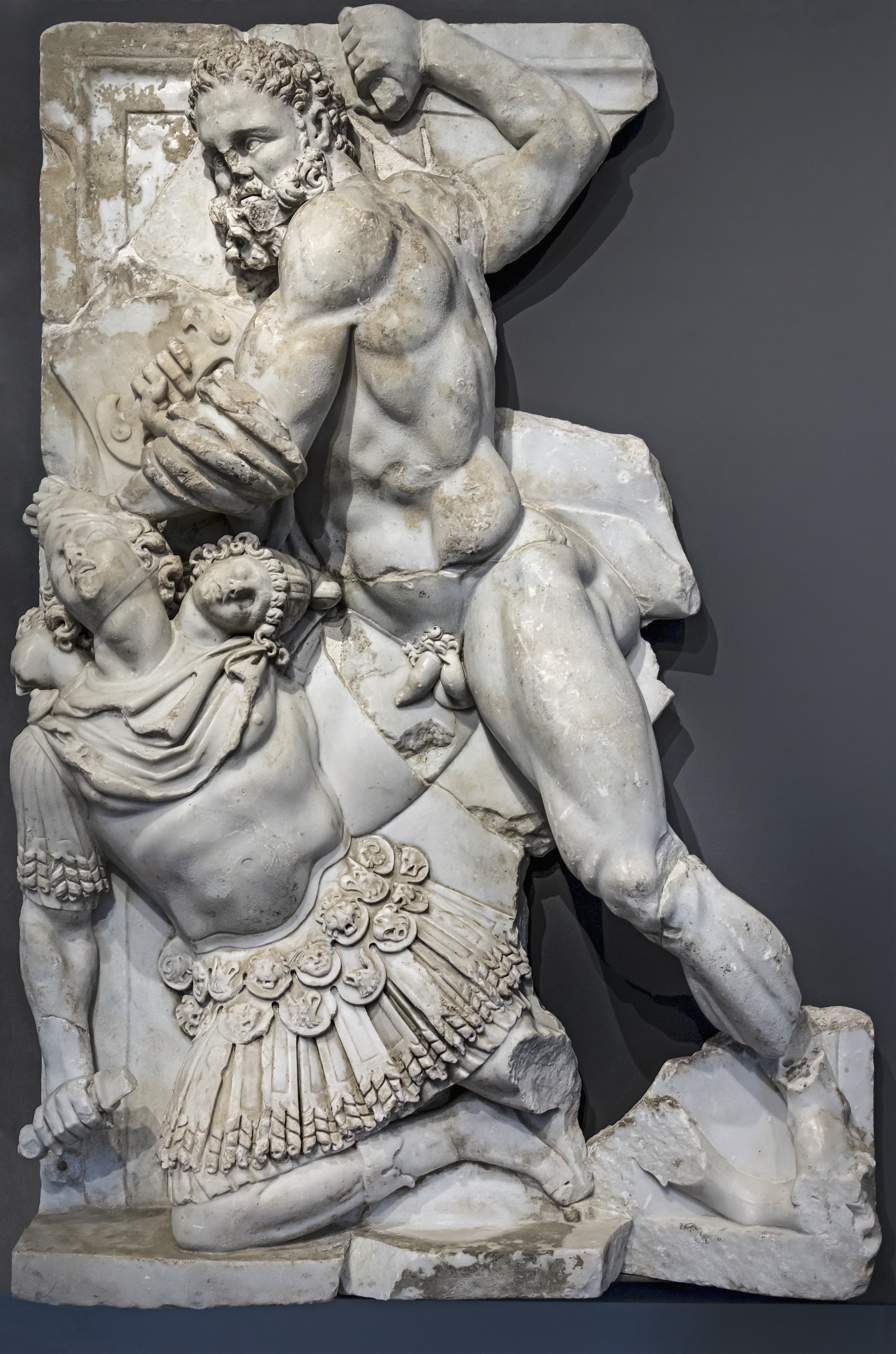
Hercules cuts the last of Geryon's head

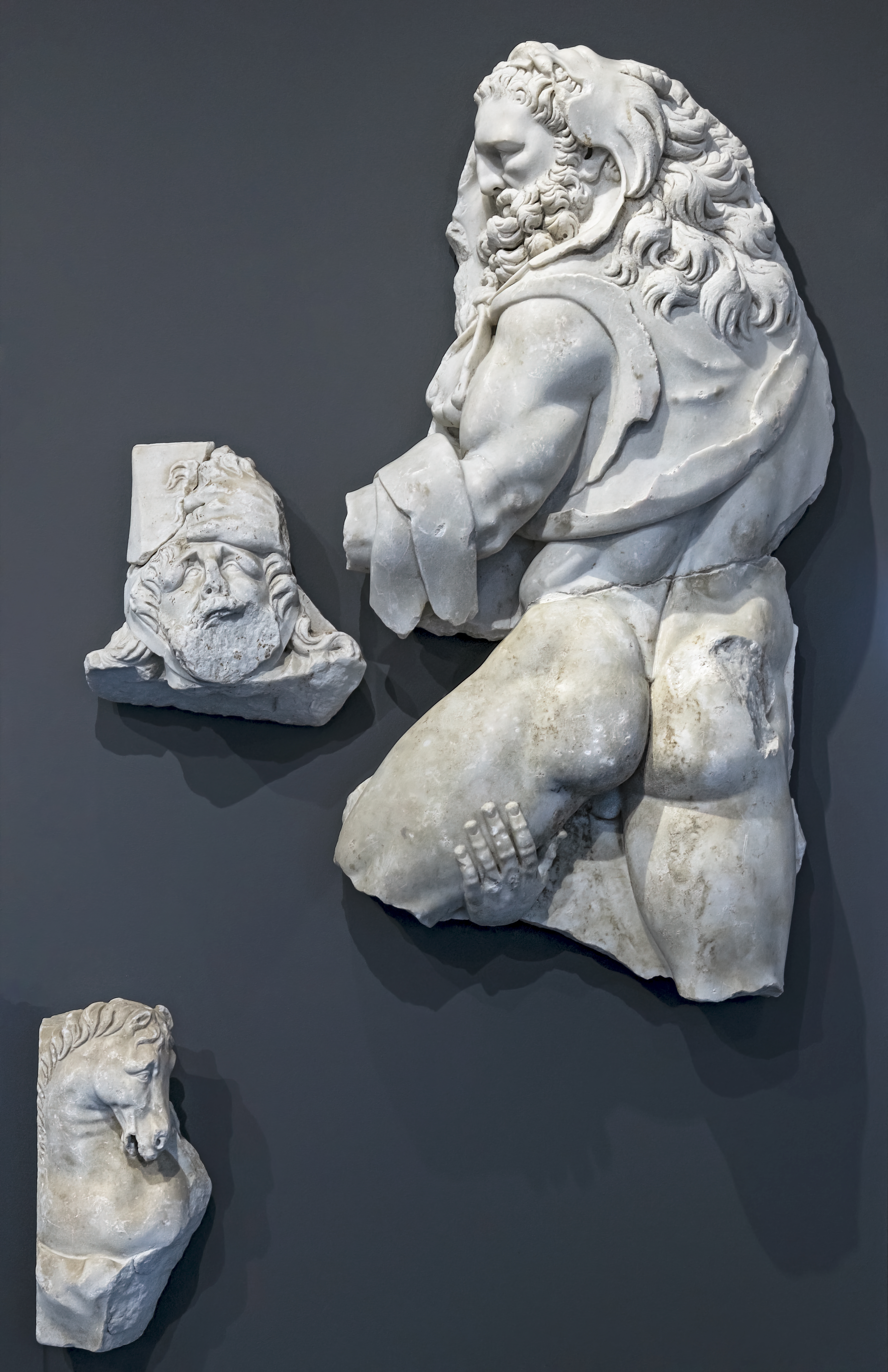
Heracles capturing the Mares of Diomedes

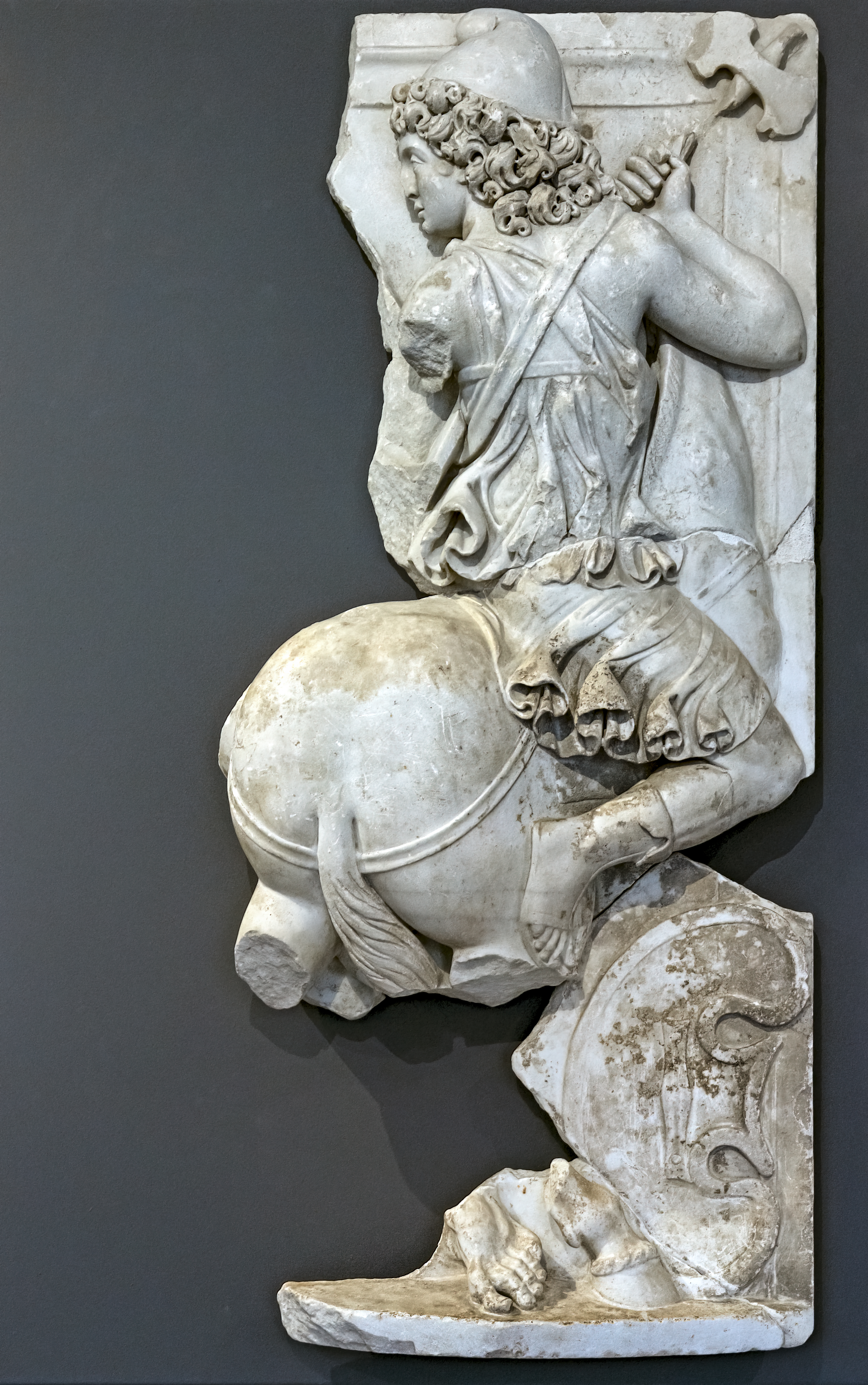
Girdle Of Hippolyta

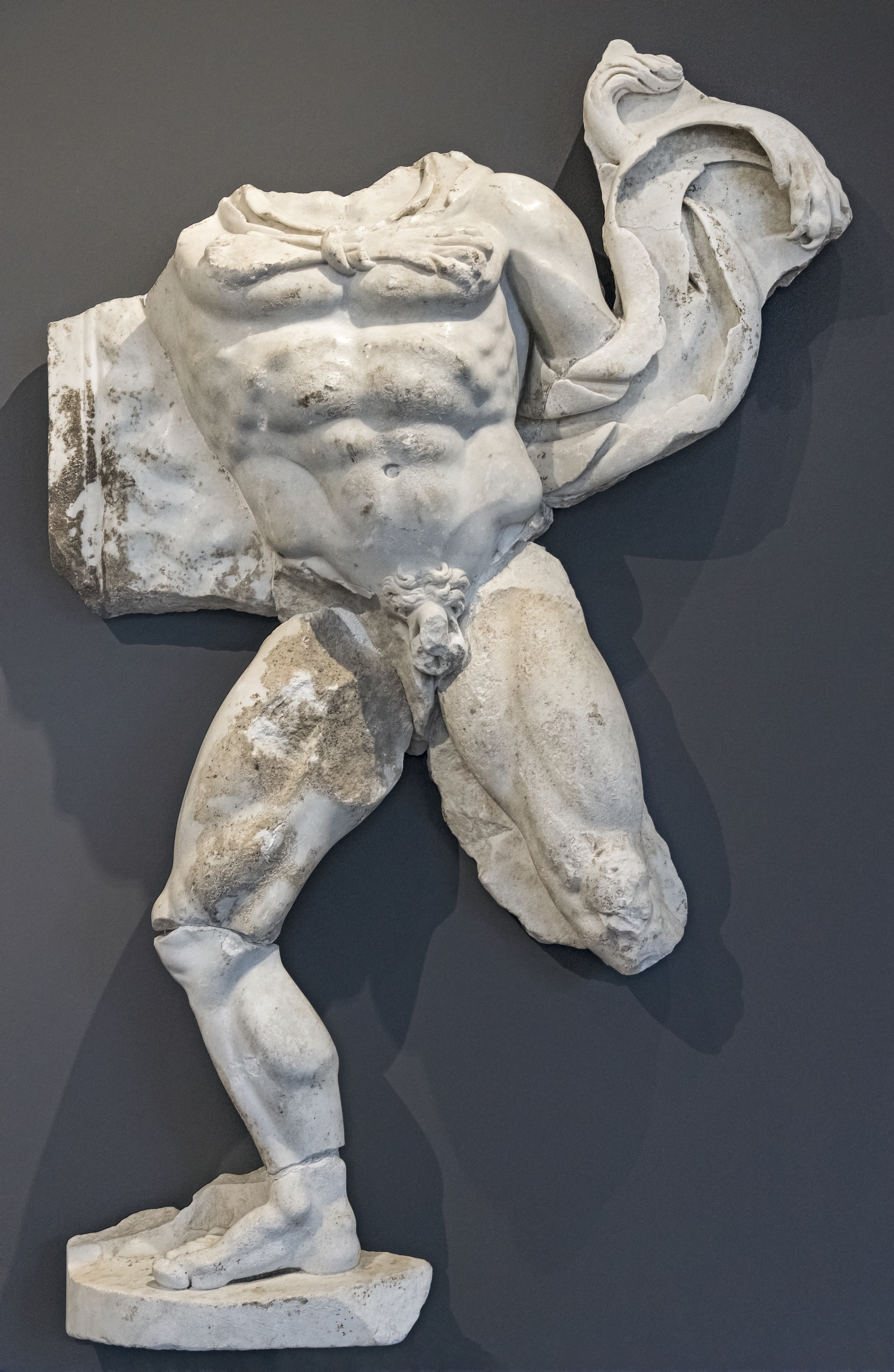
Cerberus

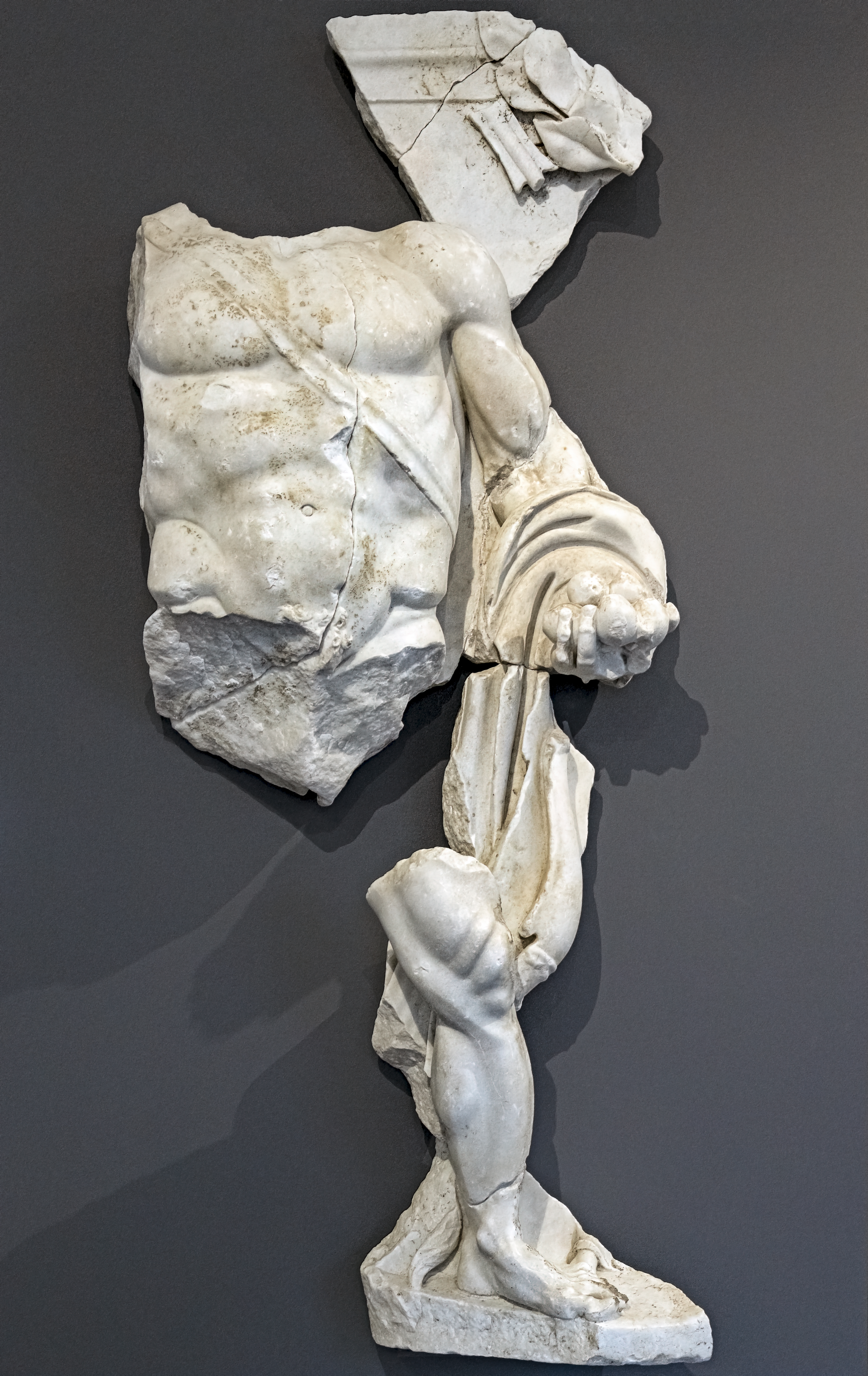
Garden of Hesperides

== Bibliography ==
- Dieulafoy, Marcel (1898). "Fouilles de Martres-Tolosane". Comptes rendus des séances de l'Académie des Inscriptions et Belles-Lettres (in French). 42 (4): 479–480. doi:10.3406/crai.1898.71217.
- Gros, Pierre (1991). La France gallo-romaine (in French). Parigi.
- Joulin, Léon (1899). "Les établissements gallo-romains de la plaine de Martres-Tolosanes". Comptes rendus des séances de l'Académie des Inscriptions et Belles-Lettres (in French). 43 (5): 596–604.
- Joulin, Léon (1905). "Les établissements antiques de Toulouse". Comptes rendus des séances de l'Académie des Inscriptions et Belles-Lettres (in French). 49 (3): 285–293. doi:10.3406/crai.1905.71609.
- Massendari, Julie (2006). 31/1. Haute-Garonne (hormis le Comminges et Toulouse). Carte archéologique de la Gaule (in French). Parigi: Éditions de la Maison des sciences de l'homme. ISBN 978-2-87754-188-6.
