= Roquefort-sur-Garonne =

- Commune
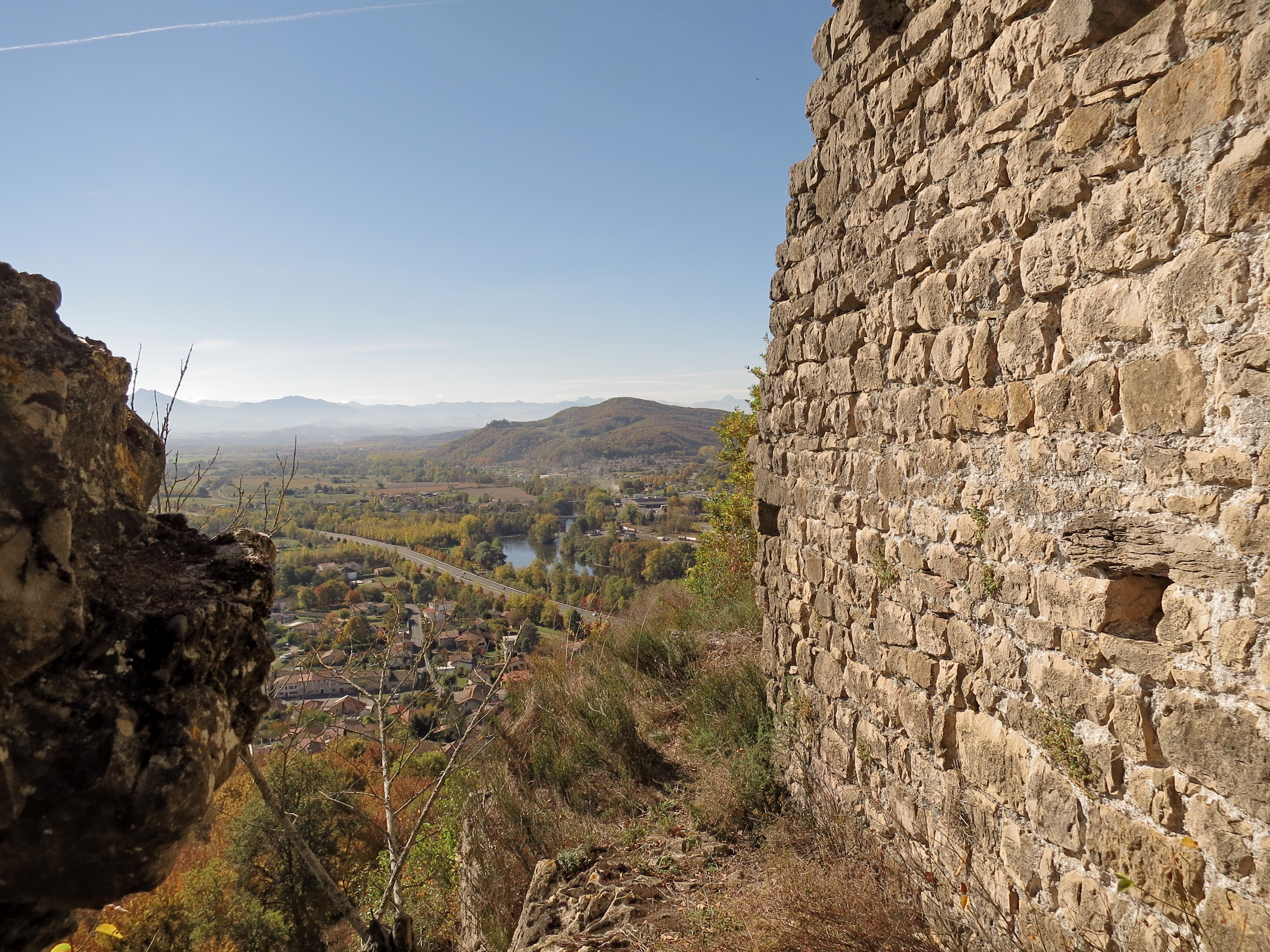
- The village seen from the castle
- Location of Roquefort-sur-Garonne
- Location within France Location within Occitanie
- Coordinates: 43°09′55″N 0°58′29″E
- Country: France
- Region: Occitania
- Department: Haute-Garonne
- Arrondissement: Saint-Gaudens
- Canton: Bagnères-de-Luchon

Government
  - Mayor (2020–2026): Jean-Bernard Portet
- Area^{1}: 13.56 km^{2} (5.24 sq mi)
- Elevation: 280 m (920 ft)
- Highest elevation: 561 m (1,841 ft)
- Lowest elevation: 257 m (843 ft)
- Population (2023): 801
  - Density: 59.1/km^{2} (153/sq mi)
- Time zone: UTC+01:00 (CET)
  - Summer (DST): UTC+02:00 (CEST)
- INSEE/Postal code: 31457 /31360
- ^{1} French Land Register data, which excludes lakes, ponds, glaciers > 1 km^{2} (0.386 sq mi or 247 acres) and river estuaries.

Roquefort-sur-Garonne (French pronunciation: [ʁɔkfɔʁ syʁ ɡaʁɔn], literally Roquefort on Garonne; Occitan: Ròcahòrt de Garona) is a commune in the Haute-Garonne department in southwestern France.

== Population ==
Historical population
Year	Pop.	±% p.a.
1968	988	—
1975	842	−2.26%
1982	810	−0.55%
1990	806	−0.06%
1999	715	−1.32%
2007	767	+0.88%
2012	789	+0.57%
2017	794	+0.13%
2023	801	+0.15%
Source: INSEE

== See also ==
- Communes of the Haute-Garonne department
