= Terrebasse =

- Commune
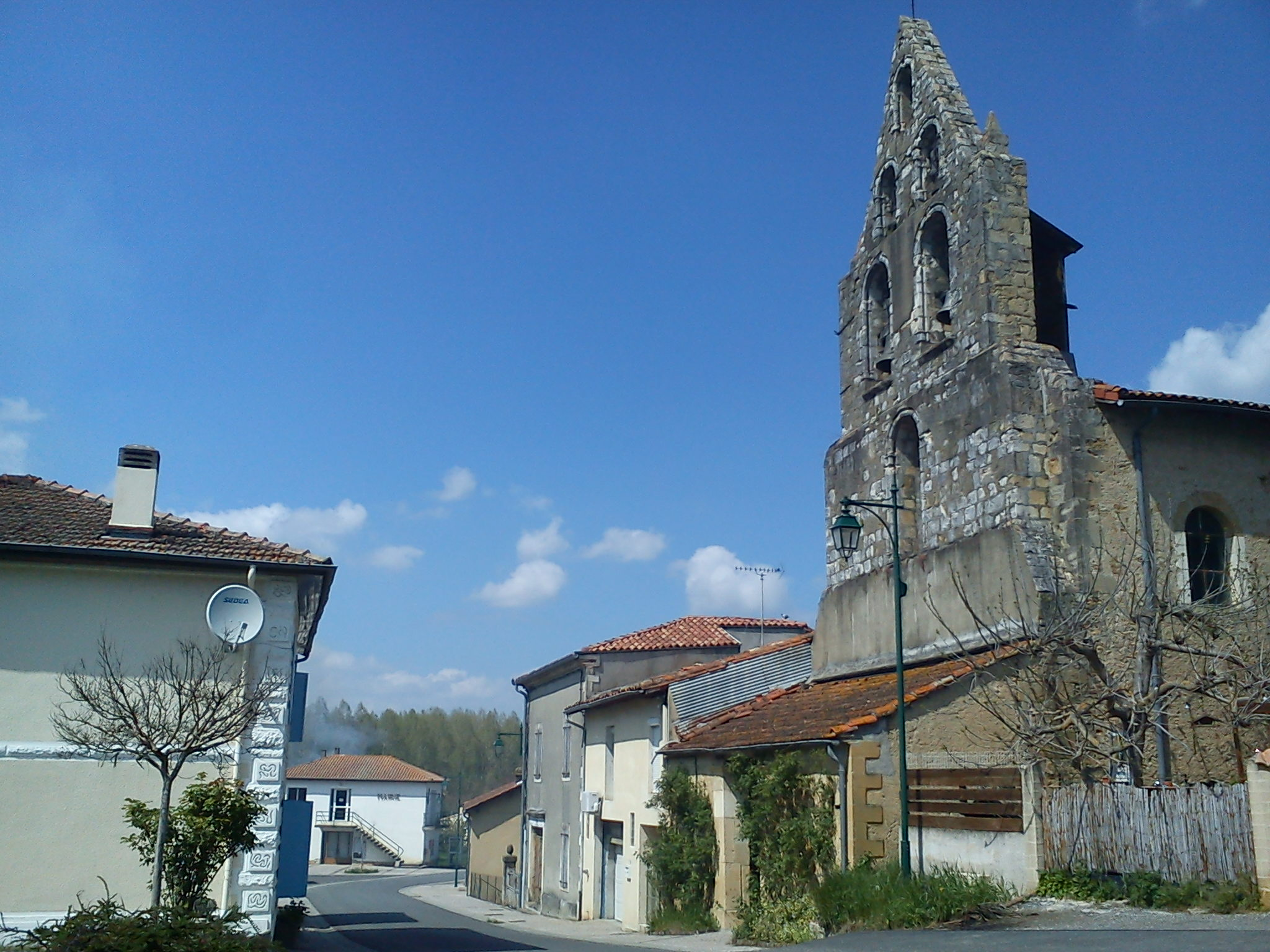
- The church and surroundings in Terrebasse
- Location of Terrebasse
- Location within France Location within Occitanie
- Coordinates: 43°14′22″N 0°57′52″E
- Country: France
- Region: Occitania
- Department: Haute-Garonne
- Arrondissement: Saint-Gaudens
- Canton: Cazères
- Intercommunality: Cœur et Coteaux du Comminges

Government
  - Mayor (2020–2026): Jean Ferrère
- Area^{1}: 9.56 km^{2} (3.69 sq mi)
- Elevation: 340 m (1,120 ft)
- Highest elevation: 380 m (1,250 ft)
- Lowest elevation: 261 m (856 ft)
- Population (2023): 135
  - Density: 14.1/km^{2} (36.6/sq mi)
- Time zone: UTC+01:00 (CET)
  - Summer (DST): UTC+02:00 (CEST)
- INSEE/Postal code: 31552 /31420
- ^{1} French Land Register data, which excludes lakes, ponds, glaciers > 1 km^{2} (0.386 sq mi or 247 acres) and river estuaries.

Terrebasse (French pronunciation: [tɛʁbas]; Occitan: Tèrrabaisha) is a commune in the Haute-Garonne department in southwestern France.

== Population ==
Historical population
Year	Pop.	±% p.a.
1968	165	—
1975	124	−4.00%
1982	116	−0.95%
1990	111	−0.55%
1999	121	+0.96%
2007	129	+0.80%
2012	140	+1.65%
2017	137	−0.43%
2023	135	−0.24%
Source: INSEE

== See also ==
- Communes of the Haute-Garonne department
