= Le Fréchet =

- Commune
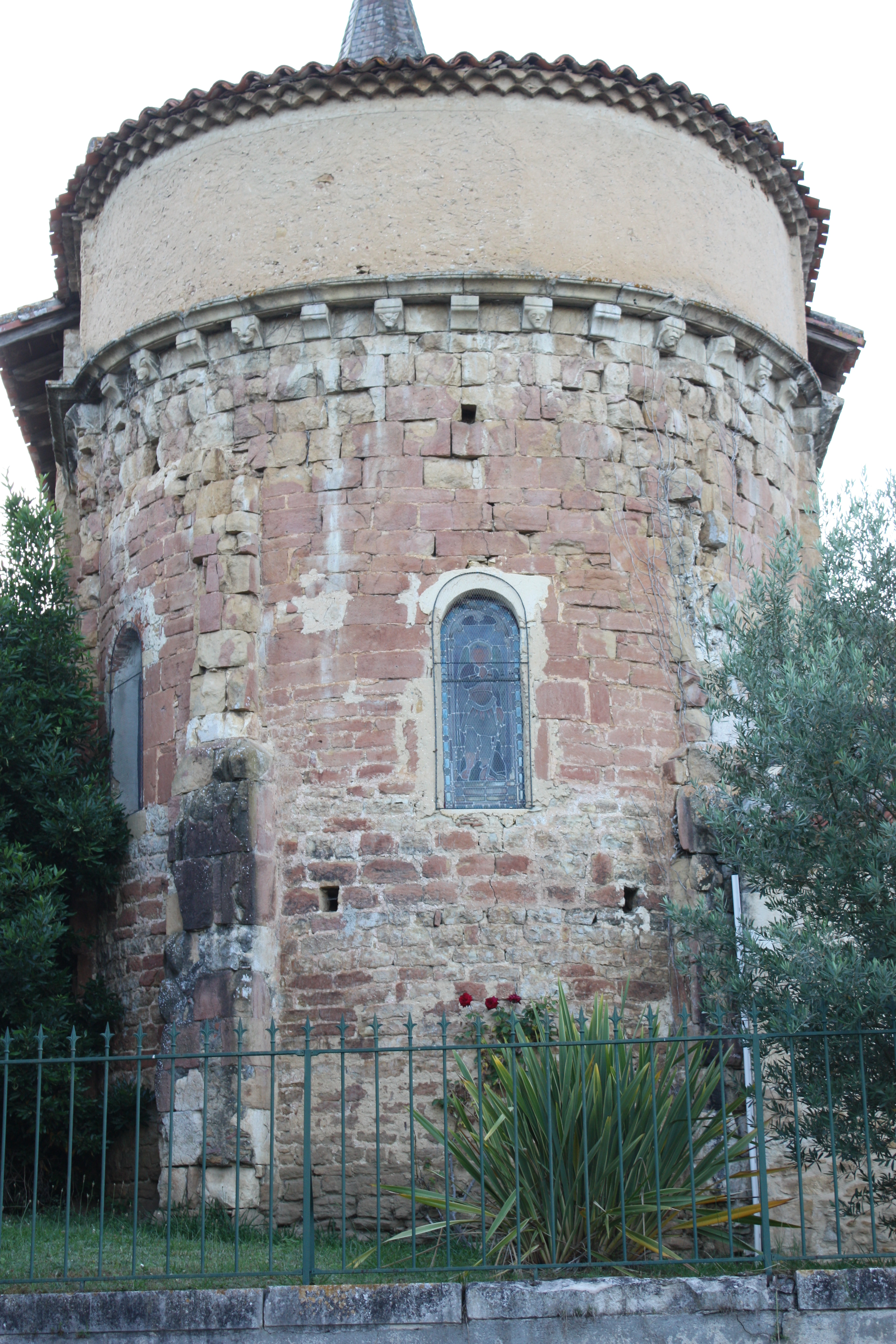
- The church in Le Fréchet
- Location of Le Fréchet
- Location within France Location within Occitanie
- Coordinates: 43°11′19″N 0°56′20″E
- Country: France
- Region: Occitania
- Department: Haute-Garonne
- Arrondissement: Saint-Gaudens
- Canton: Bagnères-de-Luchon
- Intercommunality: Cagire Garonne Salat

Government
  - Mayor (2020–2026): Frédéric Lavail
- Area^{1}: 4.21 km^{2} (1.63 sq mi)
- Elevation: 372 m (1,220 ft)
- Highest elevation: 485 m (1,591 ft)
- Lowest elevation: 318 m (1,043 ft)
- Population (2023): 129
  - Density: 30.6/km^{2} (79.4/sq mi)
- Time zone: UTC+01:00 (CET)
  - Summer (DST): UTC+02:00 (CEST)
- INSEE/Postal code: 31198 /31360
- ^{1} French Land Register data, which excludes lakes, ponds, glaciers > 1 km^{2} (0.386 sq mi or 247 acres) and river estuaries.

Le Fréchet (French pronunciation: [lə fʁeʃɛ]; Occitan: Eth Herishet) is a commune in the Haute-Garonne department in southwestern France.

== Population ==
Historical population
Year	Pop.	±% p.a.
1968	99	—
1975	112	+1.78%
1982	114	+0.25%
1990	127	+1.36%
1999	103	−2.30%
2007	111	+0.94%
2012	111	+0.00%
2017	103	−1.48%
2023	129	+3.82%
Source: INSEE

== See also ==
- Communes of the Haute-Garonne department
