= Château de Galié =

Coordinates: 42°59′13″N 0°38′8″E

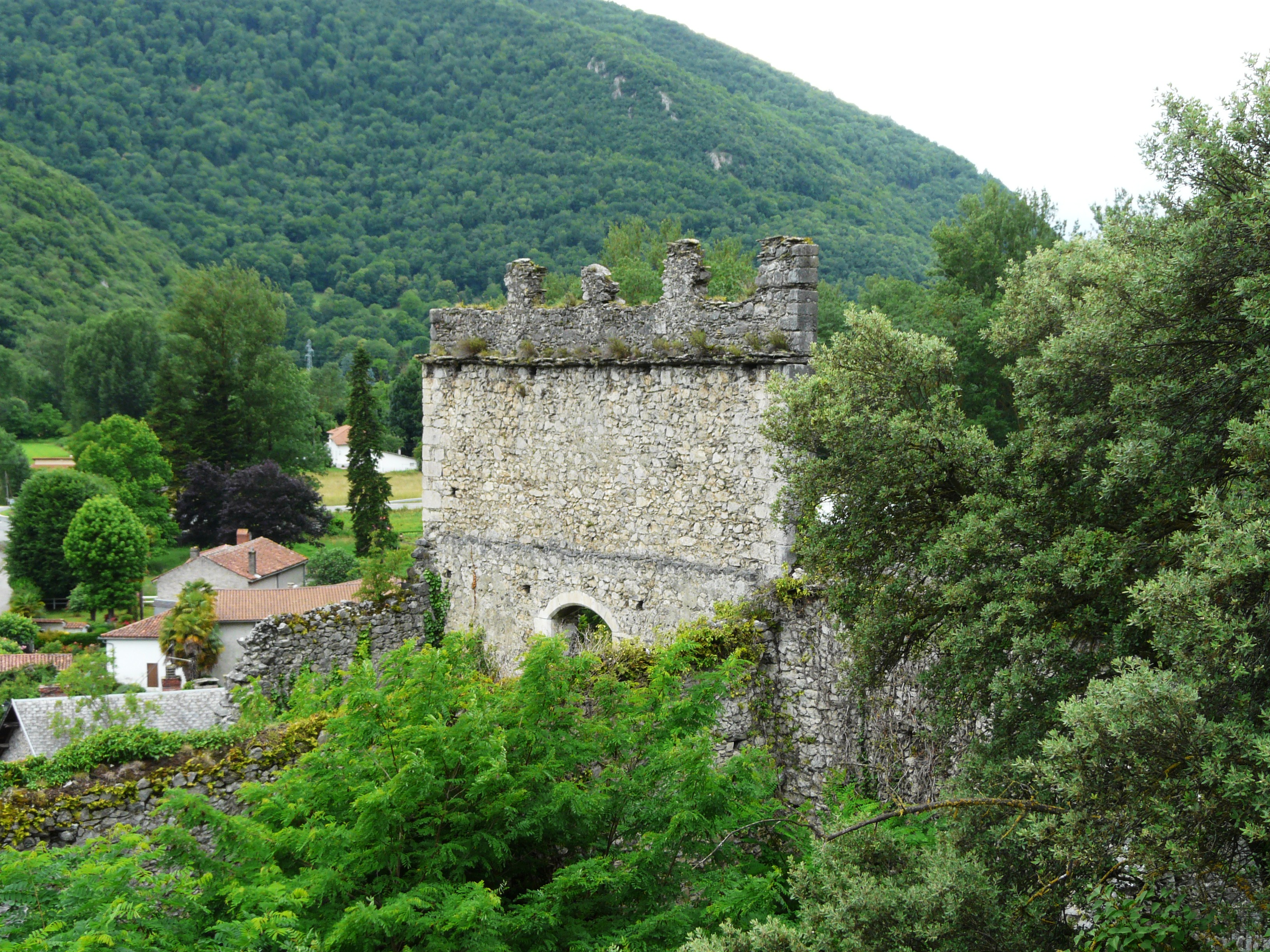
The ruins of the castle in the village of Galié, Haute-Garonne, France.

The Château de Galié is a ruined 13th- to 14th-century castle in the commune of Galié in the Haute-Garonne département of France. Privately owned, it has been listed since 1970 as a monument historique by the French Ministry of Culture.

== See also ==
- List of castles in France
