= Galié =

- Commune
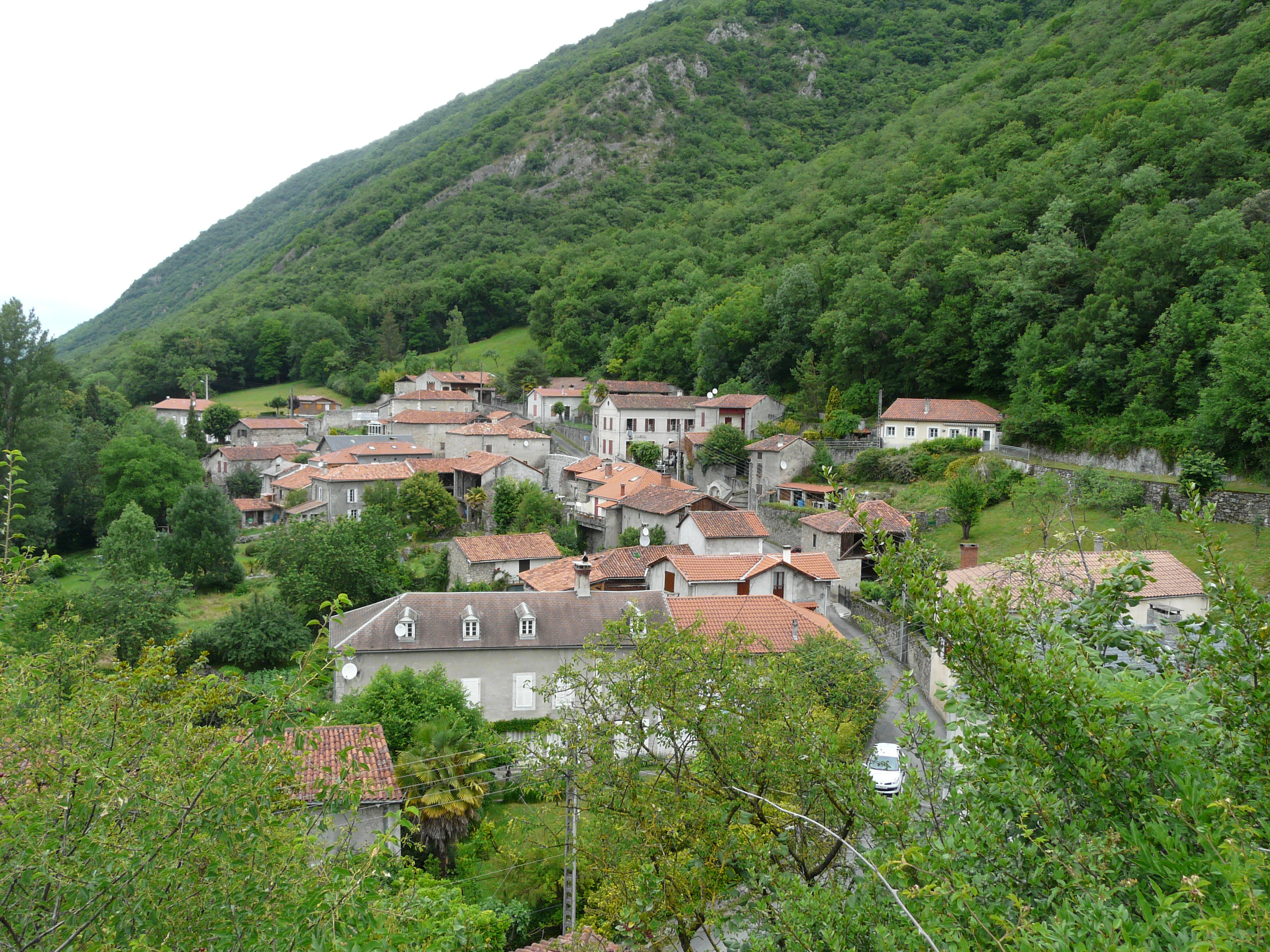
- A general view of Galié
- Location of Galié
- Location within France Location within Occitanie
- Coordinates: 42°59′22″N 0°38′01″E
- Country: France
- Region: Occitania
- Department: Haute-Garonne
- Arrondissement: Saint-Gaudens
- Canton: Bagnères-de-Luchon

Government
  - Mayor (2023–2026): Mario Hervas
- Area^{1}: 2.86 km^{2} (1.10 sq mi)
- Elevation: 460 m (1,510 ft)
- Highest elevation: 946 m (3,104 ft)
- Lowest elevation: 443 m (1,453 ft)
- Population (2023): 87
  - Density: 30/km^{2} (79/sq mi)
- Time zone: UTC+01:00 (CET)
  - Summer (DST): UTC+02:00 (CEST)
- INSEE/Postal code: 31207 /31510
- ^{1} French Land Register data, which excludes lakes, ponds, glaciers > 1 km^{2} (0.386 sq mi or 247 acres) and river estuaries.

Galié (French pronunciation: [ɡalje]; Occitan: Galièr) is a commune in the Haute-Garonne department in southwestern France.

== Population ==
Historical population
| Year | Pop. | ±% p.a. |
|---|---|---|
| 1968 | 73 | — |
| 1975 | 77 | +0.76% |
| 1982 | 86 | +1.59% |
| 1990 | 66 | −3.25% |
| 1999 | 78 | +1.87% |
| 2007 | 85 | +1.08% |
| 2012 | 90 | +1.15% |
| 2017 | 82 | −1.84% |
| 2023 | 87 | +0.99% |
Source: INSEE

== Sights ==
The Château de Galié is a ruined 13th and 14th century castle which has been listed since 1970 as a historic site by the French Ministry of Culture.

== See also ==
- Communes of the Haute-Garonne department
