= Château de Sarremezan =

15th-century castle in Haute-Garonne, France

Coordinates: 43°12′30″N 0°39′54″E

The Château de Sarremezan is a 15th-century castle in the commune of Sarremezan in the Haute-Garonne département of France.

Privately owned, it has been listed since 1955 as a monument historique by the French Ministry of Culture. Of particular note is the tower and its staircase.

== See also ==
- List of castles in France
