= Sarremezan =

- Commune
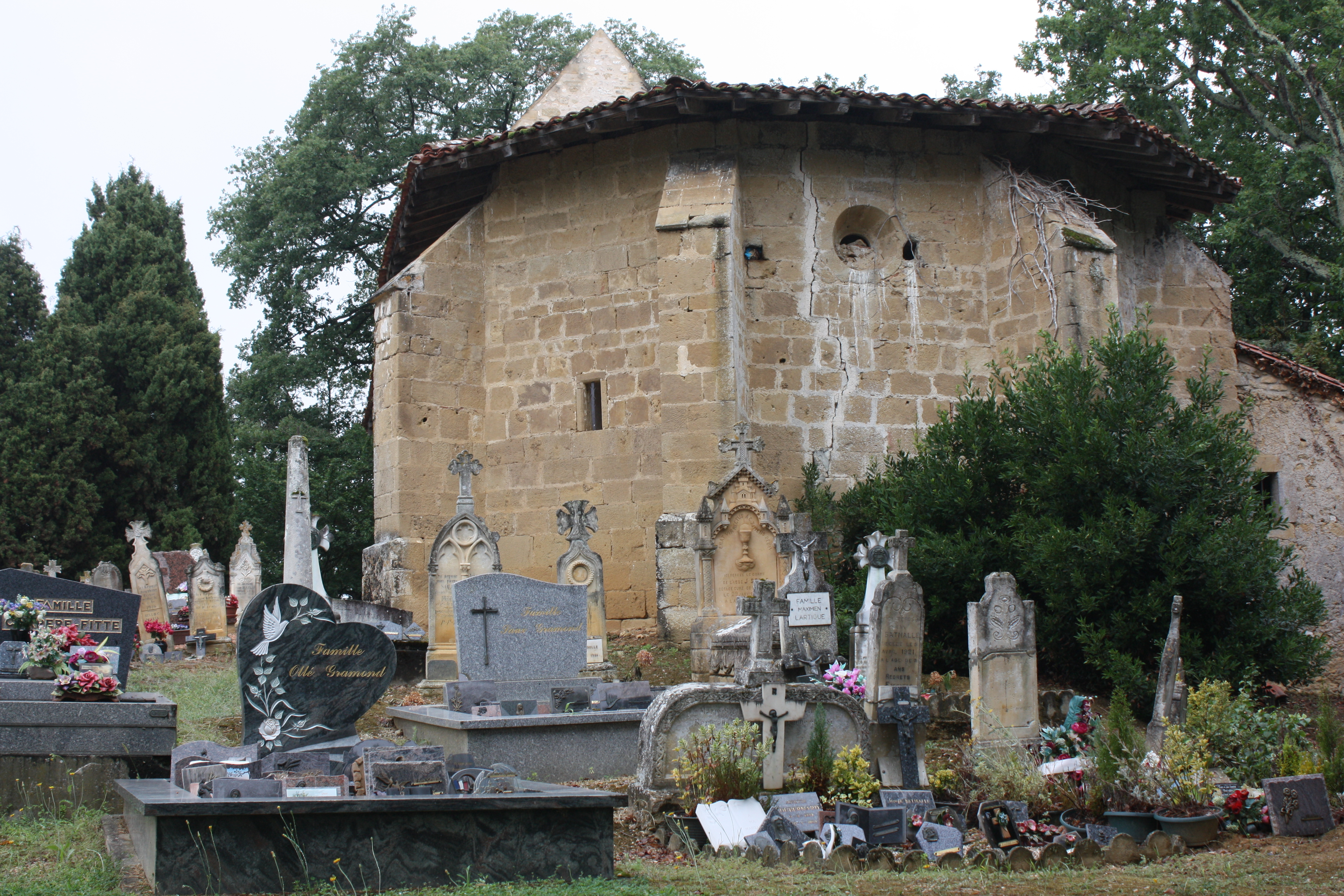
- The chapel in Sarremezan
- Location of Sarremezan
- Location within France Location within Occitanie
- Coordinates: 43°12′33″N 0°40′03″E
- Country: France
- Region: Occitania
- Department: Haute-Garonne
- Arrondissement: Saint-Gaudens
- Canton: Saint-Gaudens

Government
  - Mayor (2020–2026): Catherine Enel
- Area^{1}: 4.25 km^{2} (1.64 sq mi)
- Elevation: 420 m (1,380 ft)
- Highest elevation: 427 m (1,401 ft)
- Lowest elevation: 299 m (981 ft)
- Population (2023): 89
  - Density: 21/km^{2} (54/sq mi)
- Time zone: UTC+01:00 (CET)
  - Summer (DST): UTC+02:00 (CEST)
- INSEE/Postal code: 31532 /31350
- ^{1} French Land Register data, which excludes lakes, ponds, glaciers > 1 km^{2} (0.386 sq mi or 247 acres) and river estuaries.

Sarremezan (French pronunciation: [saʁməzɑ̃]; Occitan: Sarremesan) is a commune in the Haute-Garonne department in southwestern France.

== Population ==
Historical population
Year	Pop.	±% p.a.
1968	125	—
1975	120	−0.58%
1982	103	−2.16%
1990	77	−3.57%
1999	69	−1.21%
2007	84	+2.49%
2012	99	+3.34%
2017	97	−0.41%
2023	89	−1.42%
Source: INSEE

== Sights ==
The Château de Sarremezan is a 15th-century castle which is listed as a historic site by the French Ministry of Culture.

== Heraldry ==
Coat of arms of Sarremezan	Party: 1st Or, a rampant greyhound gules, collared of the same and buckled azure, 2nd Azure, a low sword argent; all surmounted by a chief gules charged with four silver otelles addorsed in saltire.

== See also ==
- Communes of the Haute-Garonne department
