= Pelleport (disambiguation) =

Pelleport is a commune in the Haute-Garonne department in southwestern France.

Pelleport may also refer to:

- Pelleport station, a Paris Metro station
- Rieux-de-Pelleport, a commune in the Ariège department in southwestern France
- Pelleport, a DuPont historic site along Delaware Route 141
