= Jean Toussaint Franchi =

French test pilot (1923-1985)

- Born: 4 October 1923; Algiers, Algeria
- Died: 2 September 1985 (aged 61); Léguevin, France
- Allegiance: France
- Known for: Test pilot Aviator
- Battles / wars: World War II
- Awards: Legion of Honour

Jean Toussaint Franchi (1923-1985) was a French test pilot. He was born in Algiers on October 4, 1923, died in Léguevin on September 2, 1985. Franchi had a major role in the development of Concorde.
