= Lagraulet =

Lagraulet may refer to two communes in France:

- Lagraulet-du-Gers, in the Gers department
- Lagraulet-Saint-Nicolas, in the Haute-Garonne department
