= Mérenvielle =

- Commune
- Location of Mérenvielle
- Location within France Location within Occitanie
- Coordinates: 43°37′43″N 1°09′26″E
- Country: France
- Region: Occitania
- Department: Haute-Garonne
- Arrondissement: Toulouse
- Canton: Léguevin
- Intercommunality: CC Le Grand Ouest Toulousain

Government
  - Mayor (2020–2026): Raymond Alègre
- Area^{1}: 10.45 km^{2} (4.03 sq mi)
- Elevation: 150 m (490 ft)
- Highest elevation: 286 m (938 ft)
- Lowest elevation: 149 m (489 ft)
- Population (2023): 474
  - Density: 45.4/km^{2} (117/sq mi)
- Time zone: UTC+01:00 (CET)
  - Summer (DST): UTC+02:00 (CEST)
- INSEE/Postal code: 31339 /31530
- ^{1} French Land Register data, which excludes lakes, ponds, glaciers > 1 km^{2} (0.386 sq mi or 247 acres) and river estuaries.

Mérenvielle (Occitan: Merenvial) is a commune in the Haute-Garonne department in southwestern France.

== Population ==
Historical population
Year	Pop.	±% p.a.
1968	151	—
1975	131	−2.01%
1982	204	+6.53%
1990	223	+1.12%
1999	401	+6.74%
2007	465	+1.87%
2012	465	+0.00%
2017	486	+0.89%
2023	474	−0.42%
Source: INSEE

== See also ==
- Communes of the Haute-Garonne department
