= Cabanac-Séguenville =

- Commune
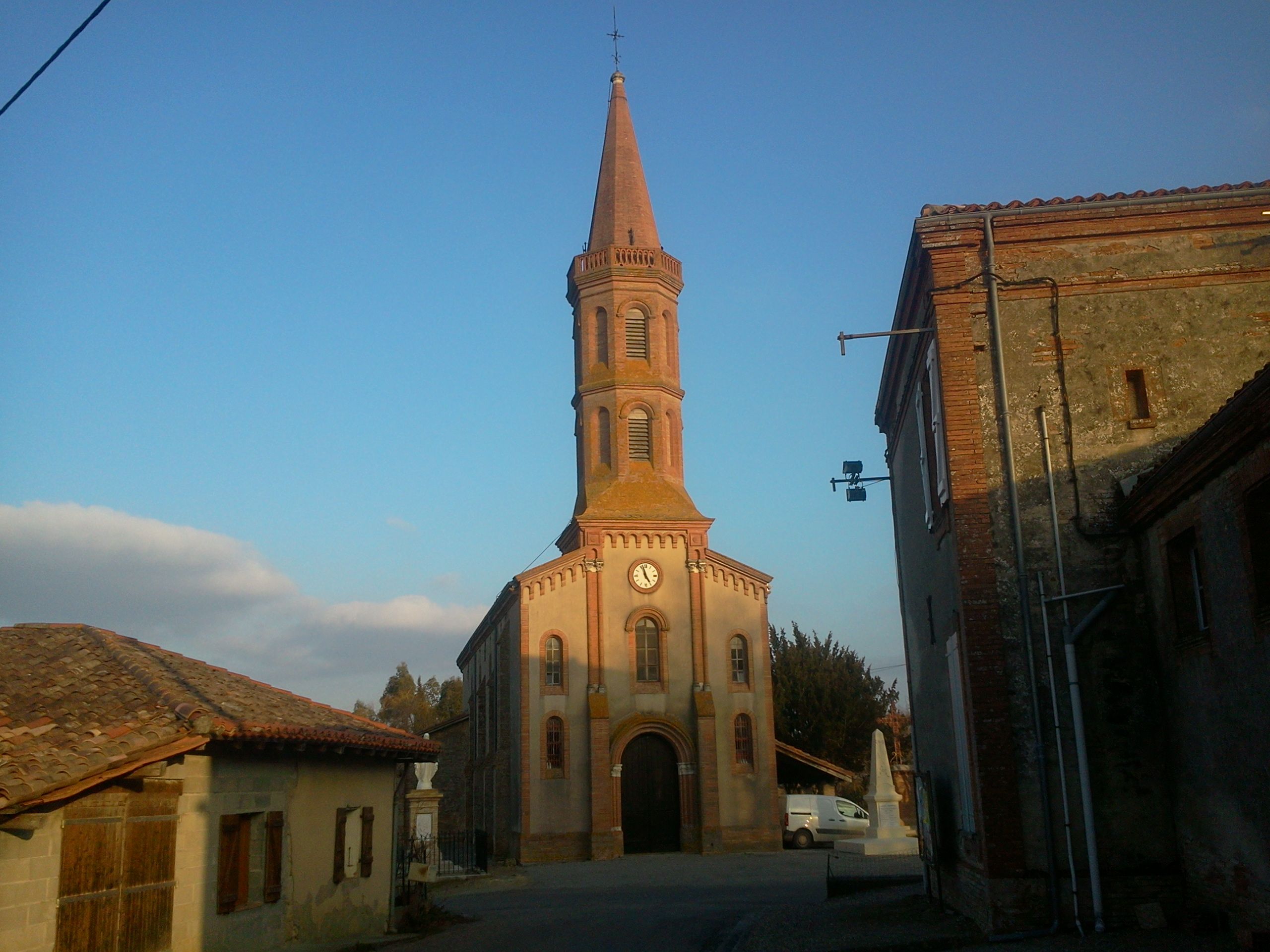
- The church in Cabanac-Séguenville

- Coat of arms
- Location of Cabanac-Séguenville
- Location within France Location within Occitanie
- Coordinates: 43°47′38″N 1°02′06″E
- Country: France
- Region: Occitania
- Department: Haute-Garonne
- Arrondissement: Toulouse
- Canton: Léguevin
- Intercommunality: Hauts Tolosans

Government
  - Mayor (2020–2026): Anne-Marie Narguet
- Area^{1}: 10.18 km^{2} (3.93 sq mi)
- Elevation: 200 m (660 ft)
- Highest elevation: 284 m (932 ft)
- Lowest elevation: 177 m (581 ft)
- Population (2023): 194
  - Density: 19.1/km^{2} (49.4/sq mi)
- Time zone: UTC+01:00 (CET)
  - Summer (DST): UTC+02:00 (CEST)
- INSEE/Postal code: 31096 /31480
- ^{1} French Land Register data, which excludes lakes, ponds, glaciers > 1 km^{2} (0.386 sq mi or 247 acres) and river estuaries.

Cabanac-Séguenville (French pronunciation: [kabanak seɡɑ̃vil]; Occitan: Cabanac e Seguenvila) is a commune in the Haute-Garonne department in southwestern France.

== Population ==
Historical population
Year	Pop.	±% p.a.
1968	126	—
1975	134	+0.88%
1982	122	−1.33%
1990	118	−0.42%
1999	128	+0.91%
2007	155	+2.42%
2012	166	+1.38%
2017	170	+0.48%
2023	194	+2.23%
Source: INSEE

== See also ==
- Communes of the Haute-Garonne department
