= Le Castéra =

- Commune
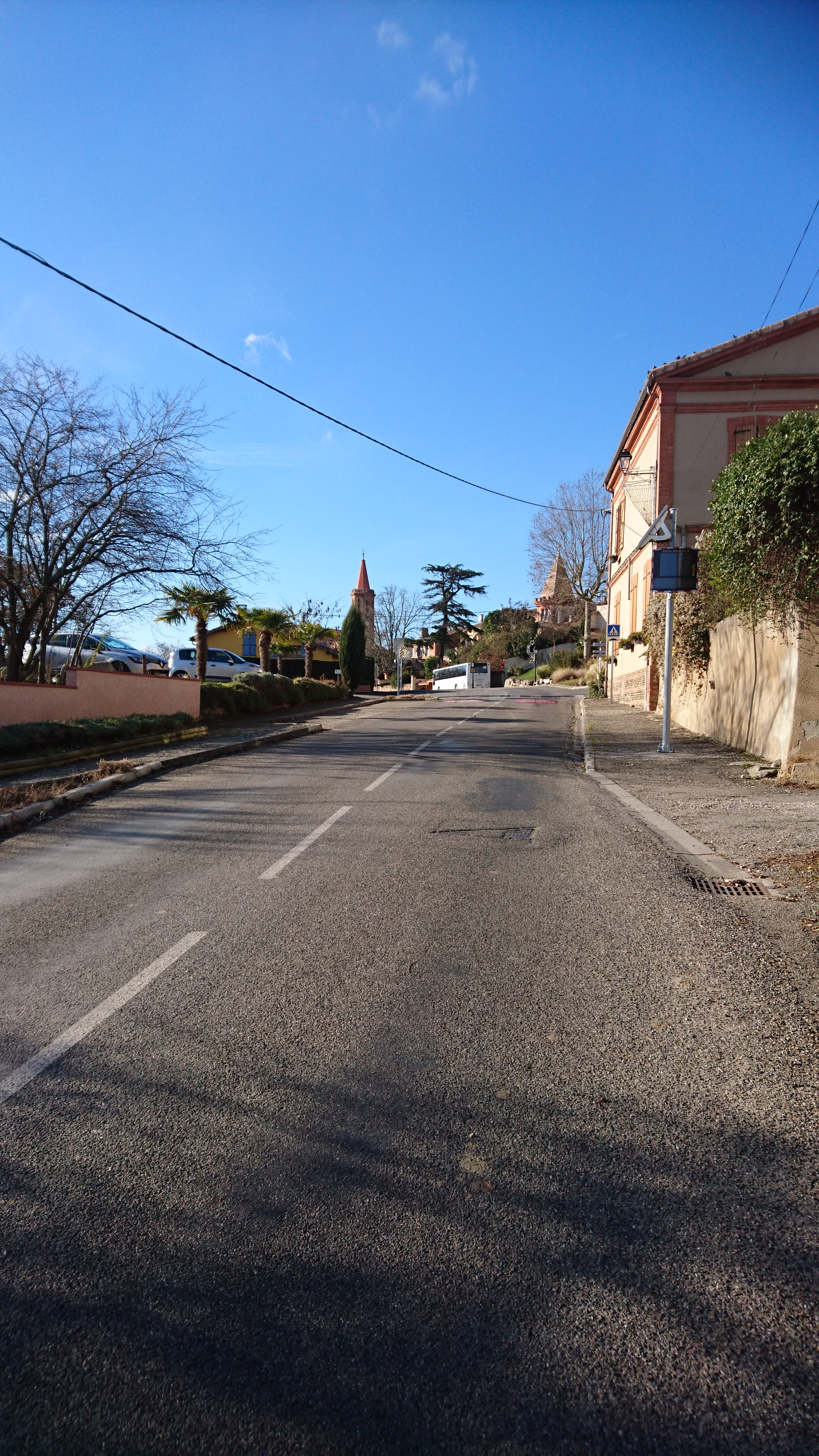
- A general view of Le Castéra

- Coat of arms
- Location of Le Castéra
- Location within France Location within Occitanie
- Coordinates: 43°40′24″N 1°08′18″E
- Country: France
- Region: Occitania
- Department: Haute-Garonne
- Arrondissement: Toulouse
- Canton: Léguevin
- Intercommunality: Hauts Tolosans

Government
  - Mayor (2020–2026): Yvan Gonzalez
- Area^{1}: 16.71 km^{2} (6.45 sq mi)
- Elevation: 250 m (820 ft)
- Highest elevation: 284 m (932 ft)
- Lowest elevation: 125 m (410 ft)
- Population (2023): 802
  - Density: 48.0/km^{2} (124/sq mi)
- Time zone: UTC+01:00 (CET)
  - Summer (DST): UTC+02:00 (CEST)
- INSEE/Postal code: 31120 /31530
- ^{1} French Land Register data, which excludes lakes, ponds, glaciers > 1 km^{2} (0.386 sq mi or 247 acres) and river estuaries.

Le Castéra (French pronunciation: [lə kasteʁa]; Occitan: Le Casterar) is a commune in the Haute-Garonne department in southwestern France.

== Population ==
Historical population
Year	Pop.	±% p.a.
1968	322	—
1975	305	−0.77%
1982	395	+3.76%
1990	455	+1.78%
1999	597	+3.06%
2007	728	+2.51%
2012	827	+2.58%
2017	736	−2.30%
2023	802	+1.44%
Source: INSEE

== See also ==
- Communes of the Haute-Garonne department
