= Le Grès =

- Commune
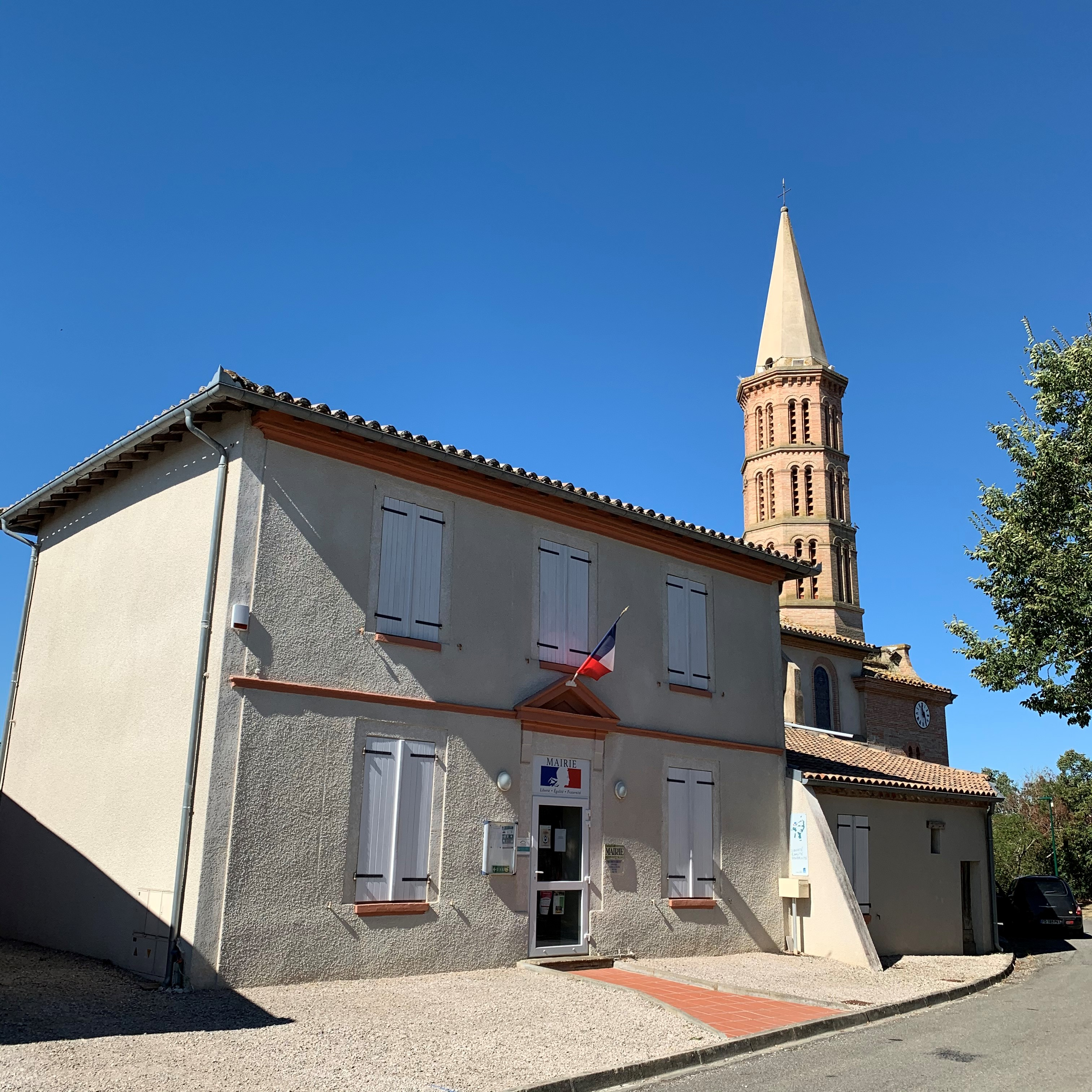
- Town hall
- Location of Le Grès
- Location within France Location within Occitanie
- Coordinates: 43°43′26″N 1°05′59″E
- Country: France
- Region: Occitania
- Department: Haute-Garonne
- Arrondissement: Toulouse
- Canton: Léguevin
- Intercommunality: Hauts Tolosans

Government
  - Mayor (2020–2026): Robert Barbréau
- Area^{1}: 8.13 km^{2} (3.14 sq mi)
- Elevation: 250 m (820 ft)
- Highest elevation: 284 m (932 ft)
- Lowest elevation: 169 m (554 ft)
- Population (2023): 463
  - Density: 56.9/km^{2} (147/sq mi)
- Time zone: UTC+01:00 (CET)
  - Summer (DST): UTC+02:00 (CEST)
- INSEE/Postal code: 31234 /31480
- ^{1} French Land Register data, which excludes lakes, ponds, glaciers > 1 km^{2} (0.386 sq mi or 247 acres) and river estuaries.

Le Grès (Occitan: Le Gres) is a commune in the Haute-Garonne department in southwestern France.

== Population ==
Historical population
Year	Pop.	±% p.a.
1968	144	—
1975	147	+0.29%
1982	200	+4.50%
1990	214	+0.85%
1999	223	+0.46%
2007	273	+2.56%
2012	384	+7.06%
2017	433	+2.43%
2023	463	+1.12%
Source: INSEE

== See also ==
- Communes of the Haute-Garonne department
