= Bretx =

- Commune
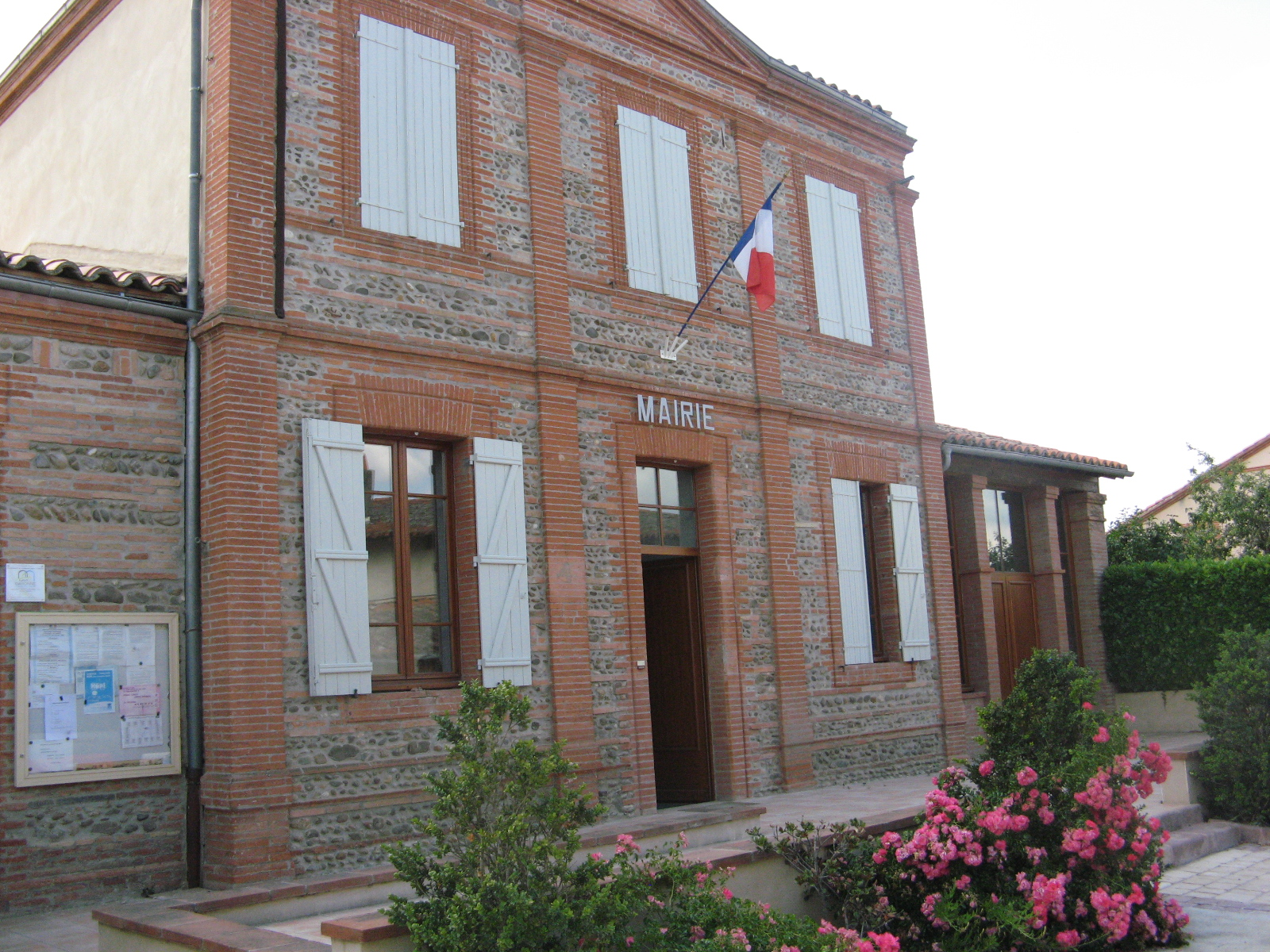
- Town hall
- Location of Bretx
- Location within France Location within Occitanie
- Coordinates: 43°42′19″N 1°11′57″E
- Country: France
- Region: Occitania
- Department: Haute-Garonne
- Arrondissement: Toulouse
- Canton: Léguevin

Government
  - Mayor (2020–2026): Jean-Claude Espie
- Area^{1}: 8.41 km^{2} (3.25 sq mi)
- Elevation: 143 m (469 ft)
- Highest elevation: 216 m (709 ft)
- Lowest elevation: 130 m (430 ft)
- Population (2023): 673
  - Density: 80.0/km^{2} (207/sq mi)
- Time zone: UTC+01:00 (CET)
  - Summer (DST): UTC+02:00 (CEST)
- INSEE/Postal code: 31089 /31530
- ^{1} French Land Register data, which excludes lakes, ponds, glaciers > 1 km^{2} (0.386 sq mi or 247 acres) and river estuaries.

Bretx (French pronunciation: [bʁɛks]; Occitan: Bretz) is a commune in the Haute-Garonne department in southwestern France.

== Population ==
Historical population
Year	Pop.	±% p.a.
1968	130	—
1975	174	+4.25%
1982	226	+3.81%
1990	315	+4.24%
1999	354	+1.31%
2007	511	+4.70%
2012	597	+3.16%
2017	663	+2.12%
2023	673	+0.25%
Source: INSEE

== See also ==
- Communes of the Haute-Garonne department
