= La Salvetat-Saint-Gilles =

- Commune
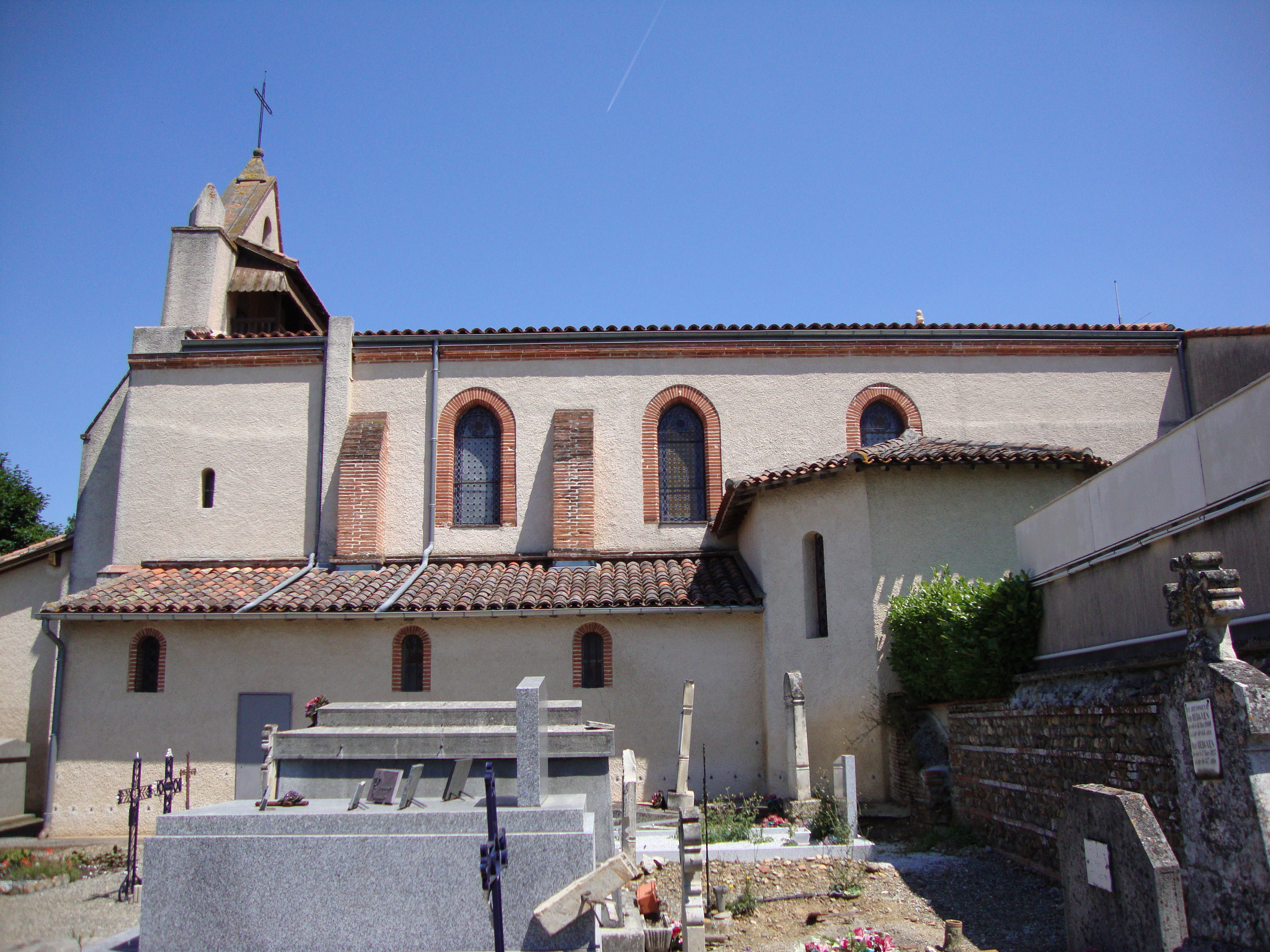
- The church in La Salvetat-Saint-Gilles

- Coat of arms
- Location of La Salvetat-Saint-Gilles
- Location within France Location within Occitanie
- Coordinates: 43°34′37″N 1°16′20″E
- Country: France
- Region: Occitania
- Department: Haute-Garonne
- Arrondissement: Toulouse
- Canton: Léguevin
- Intercommunality: CC Le Grand Ouest Toulousain

Government
  - Mayor (2020–2026): François Arderiu
- Area^{1}: 5.75 km^{2} (2.22 sq mi)
- Elevation: 168 m (551 ft)
- Highest elevation: 197 m (646 ft)
- Lowest elevation: 166 m (545 ft)
- Population (2023): 8,511
  - Density: 1,480/km^{2} (3,830/sq mi)
- Time zone: UTC+01:00 (CET)
  - Summer (DST): UTC+02:00 (CEST)
- INSEE/Postal code: 31526 /31880
- ^{1} French Land Register data, which excludes lakes, ponds, glaciers > 1 km^{2} (0.386 sq mi or 247 acres) and river estuaries.

La Salvetat-Saint-Gilles (French pronunciation: [la salvəta sɛ̃ ʒil]; Occitan: La Sauvetat de Sent Gili) is a commune in the Haute-Garonne department in southwestern France.

== Population ==
Historical population
Year	Pop.	±% p.a.
1968	575	—
1975	1,615	+15.90%
1982	2,368	+5.62%
1990	4,282	+7.69%
1999	5,779	+3.39%
2007	6,495	+1.47%
2012	7,074	+1.72%
2017	8,321	+3.30%
2023	8,511	+0.38%
Source: INSEE

== See also ==
- Communes of the Haute-Garonne department
