= Canton of Léguevin =

Coordinates: 43.60°N 1.23°E

The canton of Léguevin is an administrative division of the Haute-Garonne department, southern France. Its borders were modified at the French canton reorganisation which came into effect in March 2015. Its seat is in Léguevin.

It consists of the following communes:

1. Bellegarde-Sainte-Marie
2. Bellesserre
3. Bretx
4. Brignemont
5. Le Burgaud
6. Cabanac-Séguenville
7. Cadours
8. Le Castéra
9. Caubiac
10. Cox
11. Daux
12. Drudas
13. Garac
14. Grenade
15. Le Grès
16. Lagraulet-Saint-Nicolas
17. Laréole
18. Larra
19. Lasserre-Pradère
20. Launac
21. Léguevin
22. Lévignac
23. Menville
24. Mérenvielle
25. Merville
26. Montaigut-sur-Save
27. Ondes
28. Pelleport
29. Puysségur
30. Saint-Cézert
31. Sainte-Livrade
32. Saint-Paul-sur-Save
33. La Salvetat-Saint-Gilles
34. Thil
35. Vignaux
