= Menville =

- Commune
- Coat of arms
- Location of Menville
- Location within France Location within Occitanie
- Coordinates: 43°40′42″N 1°11′41″E
- Country: France
- Region: Occitania
- Department: Haute-Garonne
- Arrondissement: Toulouse
- Canton: Léguevin

Government
  - Mayor (2020–2026): Marie-Luce Fourcade
- Area^{1}: 5.07 km^{2} (1.96 sq mi)
- Elevation: 127 m (417 ft)
- Highest elevation: 225 m (738 ft)
- Lowest elevation: 122 m (400 ft)
- Population (2023): 805
  - Density: 159/km^{2} (411/sq mi)
- Time zone: UTC+01:00 (CET)
  - Summer (DST): UTC+02:00 (CEST)
- INSEE/Postal code: 31338 /31530
- ^{1} French Land Register data, which excludes lakes, ponds, glaciers > 1 km^{2} (0.386 sq mi or 247 acres) and river estuaries.

Menville is a commune in the Haute-Garonne department in southwestern France.

== Population ==
Historical population
| Year | Pop. | ±% p.a. |
|---|---|---|
| 1968 | 129 | — |
| 1975 | 150 | +2.18% |
| 1982 | 193 | +3.67% |
| 1990 | 301 | +5.71% |
| 1999 | 406 | +3.38% |
| 2007 | 481 | +2.14% |
| 2012 | 631 | +5.58% |
| 2017 | 768 | +4.01% |
| 2023 | 805 | +0.79% |
Source: INSEE

== See also ==
- Communes of the Haute-Garonne department
