= Cox, Haute-Garonne =

Cox
- Commune
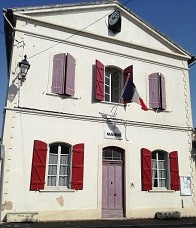
- Cox Town Hall

- Coat of arms
- Location of Cox
- Location within France Location within Occitanie
- Coordinates: 43°45′42″N 1°02′35″E
- Country: France
- Region: Occitania
- Department: Haute-Garonne
- Arrondissement: Toulouse
- Canton: Léguevin
- Intercommunality: Hauts Tolosans

Government
  - Mayor (2020–2026): Céline Oudin
- Area^{1}: 4.07 km^{2} (1.57 sq mi)
- Elevation: 291 m (955 ft)
- Highest elevation: 296 m (971 ft)
- Lowest elevation: 179 m (587 ft)
- Population (2023): 364
  - Density: 89.4/km^{2} (232/sq mi)
- Time zone: UTC+01:00 (CET)
  - Summer (DST): UTC+02:00 (CEST)
- INSEE/Postal code: 31156 /31480
- ^{1} French Land Register data, which excludes lakes, ponds, glaciers > 1 km^{2} (0.386 sq mi or 247 acres) and river estuaries.

Cox is a commune in the Haute-Garonne department in southwestern France. It is about 40 km north west of Toulouse.

The name Cox is derived from the Occitan word 'Coth' meaning 'top of the hill'.

The village has a museum of pottery, housed in the former home of potter Joseph Laballe (1886-1942).

== Population ==
Historical population
Year	Pop.	±% p.a.
1968	236	—
1975	224	−0.74%
1982	214	−0.65%
1990	237	+1.28%
1999	267	+1.33%
2007	323	+2.41%
2012	343	+1.21%
2017	341	−0.12%
2023	364	+1.09%
Source: INSEE

== See also ==
- Communes of the Haute-Garonne department
