= Brignemont =

- Commune
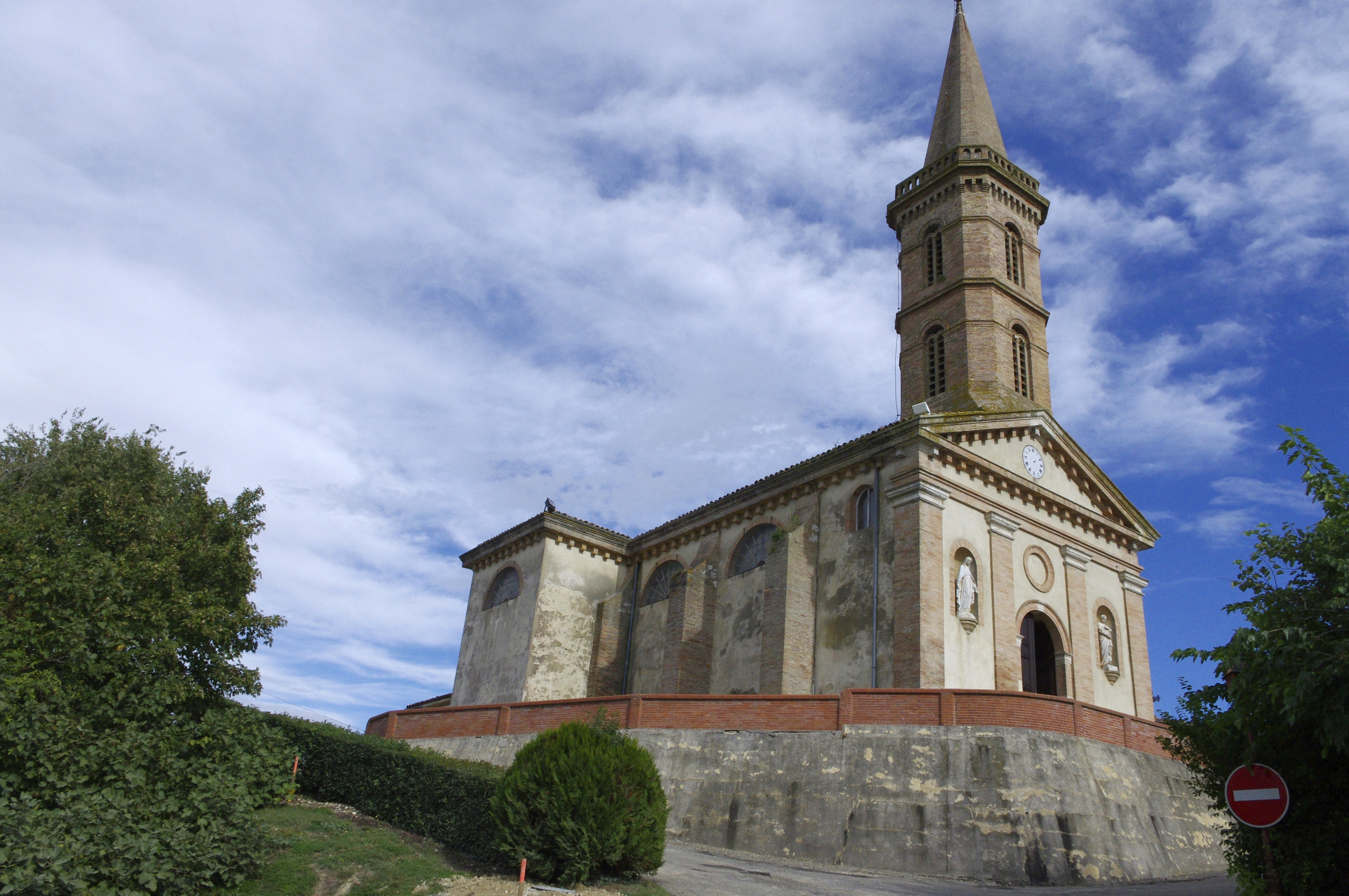
- The church in Brignemont

- Coat of arms
- Location of Brignemont
- Location within France Location within Occitanie
- Coordinates: 43°46′55″N 0°59′24″E
- Country: France
- Region: Occitania
- Department: Haute-Garonne
- Arrondissement: Toulouse
- Canton: Léguevin
- Intercommunality: Hauts Tolosans

Government
  - Mayor (2020–2026): Jérôme Boussarot
- Area^{1}: 21.96 km^{2} (8.48 sq mi)
- Elevation: 250 m (820 ft)
- Highest elevation: 286 m (938 ft)
- Lowest elevation: 136 m (446 ft)
- Population (2023): 366
  - Density: 16.7/km^{2} (43.2/sq mi)
- Time zone: UTC+01:00 (CET)
  - Summer (DST): UTC+02:00 (CEST)
- INSEE/Postal code: 31090 /31480
- ^{1} French Land Register data, which excludes lakes, ponds, glaciers > 1 km^{2} (0.386 sq mi or 247 acres) and river estuaries.

Brignemont (French pronunciation: [bʁiɲmɔ̃]; Occitan: Brinhemont) is a commune in the Haute-Garonne department in southwestern France.

== Population ==
Historical population
| Year | Pop. | ±% p.a. |
|---|---|---|
| 1968 | 324 | — |
| 1975 | 330 | +0.26% |
| 1982 | 338 | +0.34% |
| 1990 | 314 | −0.92% |
| 1999 | 317 | +0.11% |
| 2007 | 359 | +1.57% |
| 2012 | 391 | +1.72% |
| 2017 | 387 | −0.21% |
| 2023 | 366 | −0.93% |
Source: INSEE

== See also ==
- Communes of the Haute-Garonne department
