= Bellesserre =

- Commune
- Location of Bellesserre
- Location within France Location within Occitanie
- Coordinates: 43°47′28″N 1°06′36″E
- Country: France
- Region: Occitania
- Department: Haute-Garonne
- Arrondissement: Toulouse
- Canton: Léguevin
- Intercommunality: Hauts Tolosans

Government
  - Mayor (2020–2026): Sébastien Noël
- Area^{1}: 3.39 km^{2} (1.31 sq mi)
- Elevation: 255 m (837 ft)
- Highest elevation: 274 m (899 ft)
- Lowest elevation: 174 m (571 ft)
- Population (2023): 109
  - Density: 32.2/km^{2} (83.3/sq mi)
- Time zone: UTC+01:00 (CET)
  - Summer (DST): UTC+02:00 (CEST)
- INSEE/Postal code: 31062 /31480
- ^{1} French Land Register data, which excludes lakes, ponds, glaciers > 1 km^{2} (0.386 sq mi or 247 acres) and river estuaries.

Bellesserre is a commune in the Haute-Garonne department in southwestern France.

== Population ==
Historical population
Year	Pop.	±% p.a.
1968	40	—
1975	42	+0.70%
1982	36	−2.18%
1990	33	−1.08%
1999	50	+4.73%
2007	84	+6.70%
2012	95	+2.49%
2017	110	+2.98%
2023	109	−0.15%
Source: INSEE

== See also ==
- Communes of the Haute-Garonne department
