= Garac, France =

Garac
- Commune
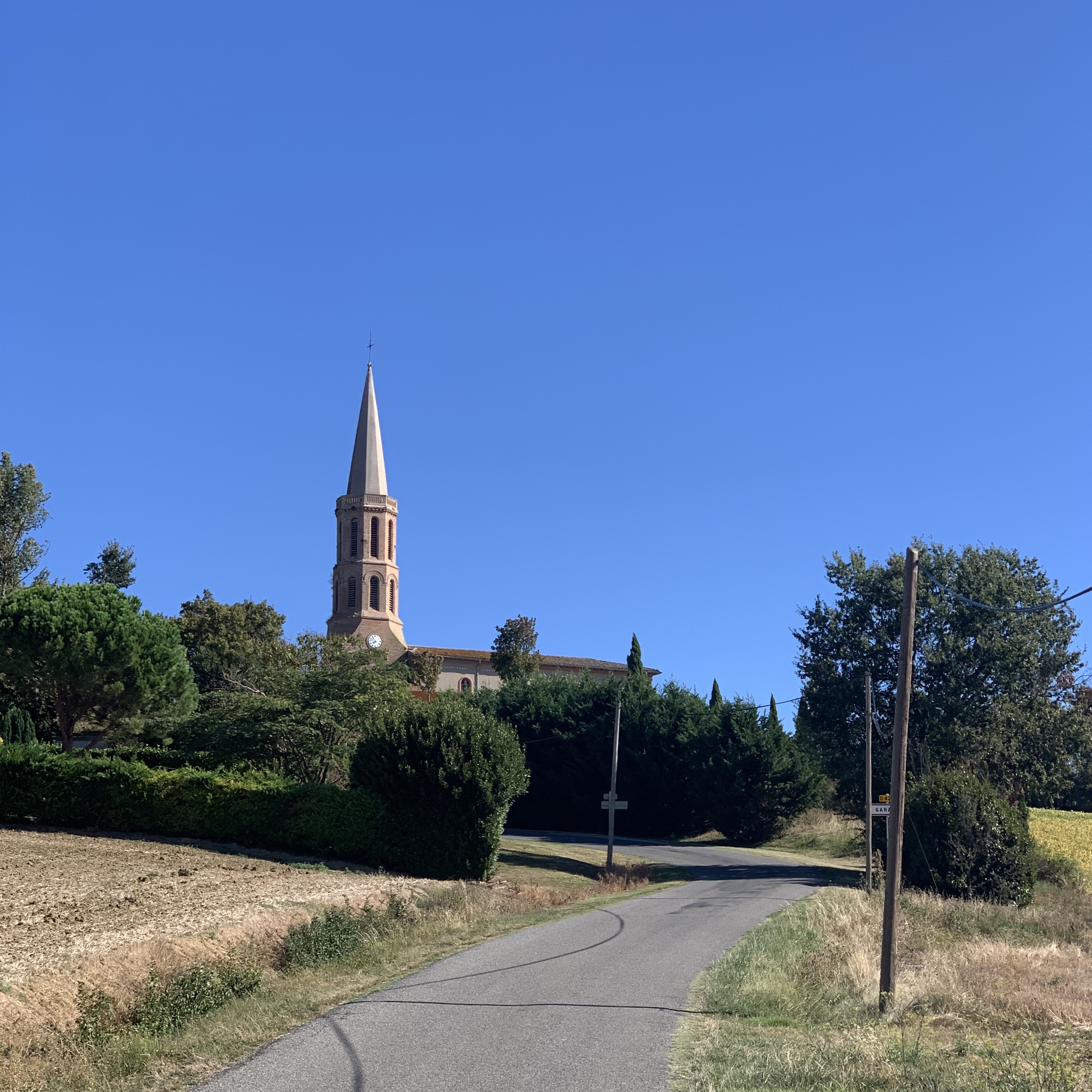
- Location of Garac
- Location within France Location within Occitanie
- Coordinates: 43°41′32″N 1°05′21″E
- Country: France
- Region: Occitania
- Department: Haute-Garonne
- Arrondissement: Toulouse
- Canton: Léguevin
- Intercommunality: Hauts Tolosans

Government
  - Mayor (2020–2026): Joël Mélac
- Area^{1}: 6.05 km^{2} (2.34 sq mi)
- Elevation: 250 m (820 ft)
- Highest elevation: 274 m (899 ft)
- Lowest elevation: 150 m (490 ft)
- Population (2023): 168
  - Density: 27.8/km^{2} (71.9/sq mi)
- Time zone: UTC+01:00 (CET)
  - Summer (DST): UTC+02:00 (CEST)
- INSEE/Postal code: 31209 /31480
- ^{1} French Land Register data, which excludes lakes, ponds, glaciers > 1 km^{2} (0.386 sq mi or 247 acres) and river estuaries.

Garac (French pronunciation: [ɡaʁak]) is a commune in the Haute-Garonne department in southwestern France.

== Population ==
Historical population
Year	Pop.	±% p.a.
1968	134	—
1975	118	−1.80%
1982	112	−0.74%
1990	123	+1.18%
1999	157	+2.75%
2007	169	+0.92%
2012	170	+0.12%
2017	154	−1.96%
2023	168	+1.46%
Source: INSEE

== See also ==
- Communes of the Haute-Garonne department
