= Le Burgaud =

- Commune
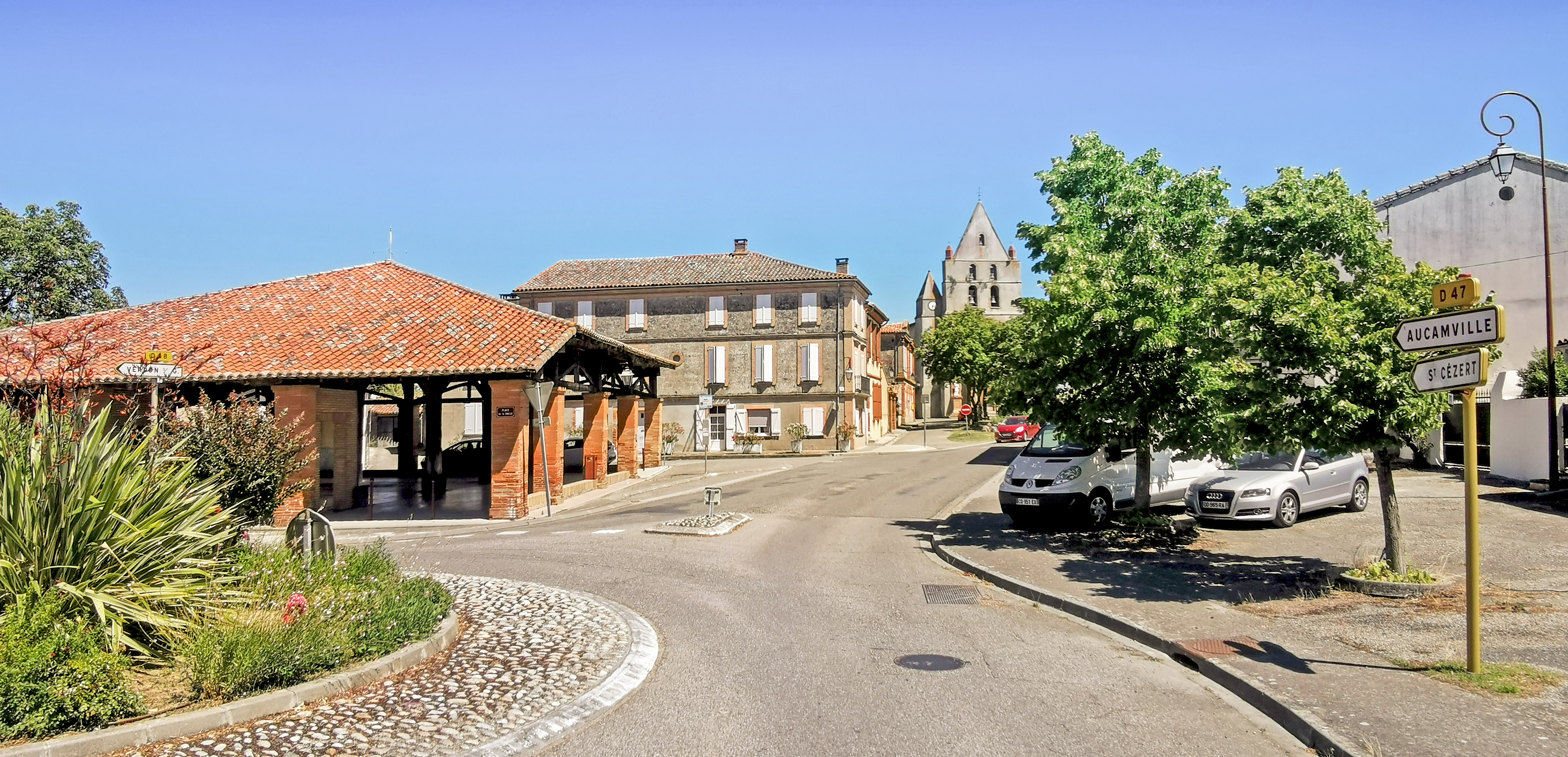
- The center of the village.

- Coat of arms
- Location of Le Burgaud
- Location within France Location within Occitanie
- Coordinates: 43°47′44″N 1°09′47″E
- Country: France
- Region: Occitania
- Department: Haute-Garonne
- Arrondissement: Toulouse
- Canton: Léguevin

Government
  - Mayor (2020–2026): Laurent Zanetti
- Area^{1}: 24.18 km^{2} (9.34 sq mi)
- Elevation: 158 m (518 ft)
- Highest elevation: 253 m (830 ft)
- Lowest elevation: 143 m (469 ft)
- Population (2023): 944
  - Density: 39.0/km^{2} (101/sq mi)
- Time zone: UTC+01:00 (CET)
  - Summer (DST): UTC+02:00 (CEST)
- INSEE/Postal code: 31093 /31330
- ^{1} French Land Register data, which excludes lakes, ponds, glaciers > 1 km^{2} (0.386 sq mi or 247 acres) and river estuaries.

Le Burgaud (French pronunciation: [lə byʁɡo]; Occitan: Le Burgau) is a commune of the Haute-Garonne department in southwestern France.

== Population ==
Historical population
Year	Pop.	±% p.a.
1968	419	—
1975	397	−0.77%
1982	419	+0.77%
1990	429	+0.30%
1999	484	+1.35%
2007	571	+2.09%
2012	868	+8.74%
2017	979	+2.44%
2023	944	−0.60%
Source: INSEE

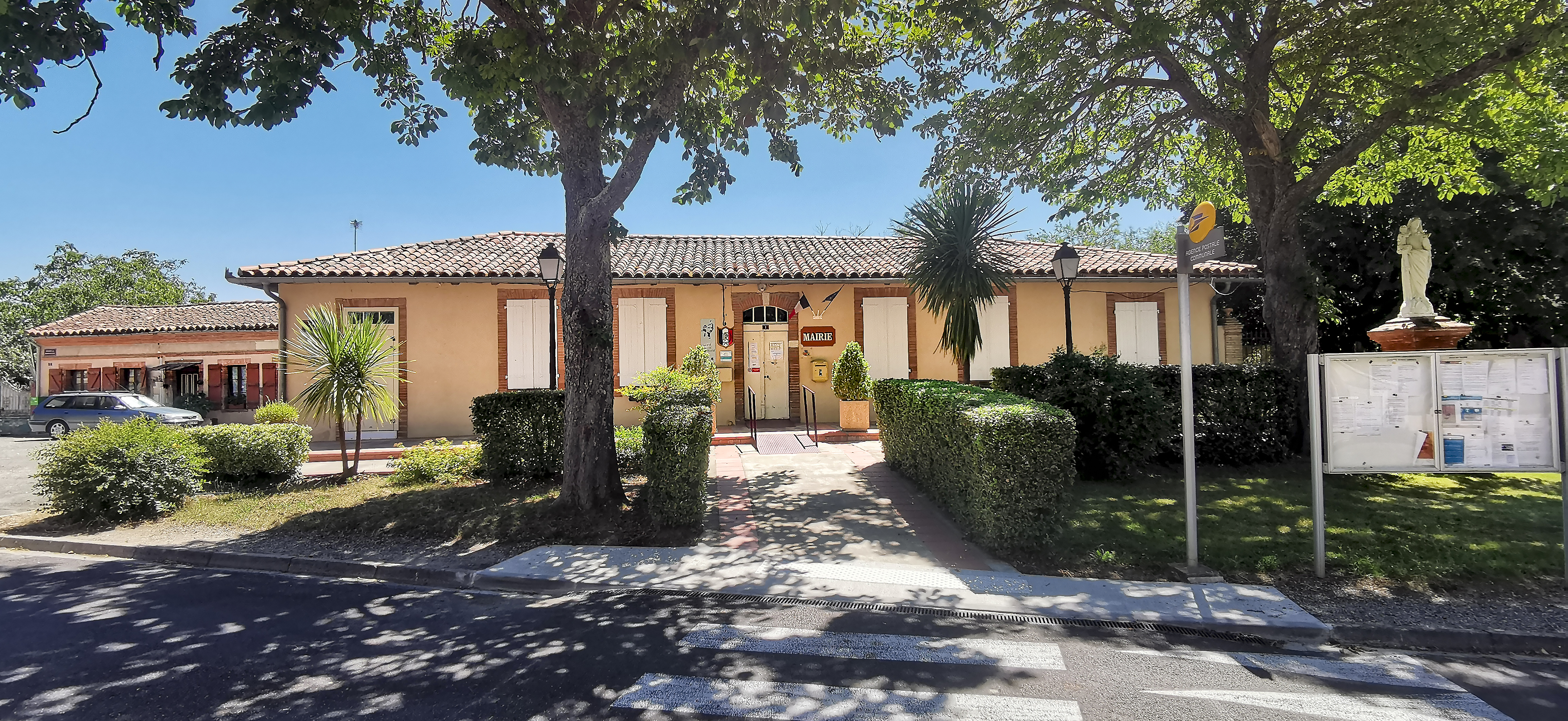
The town hall

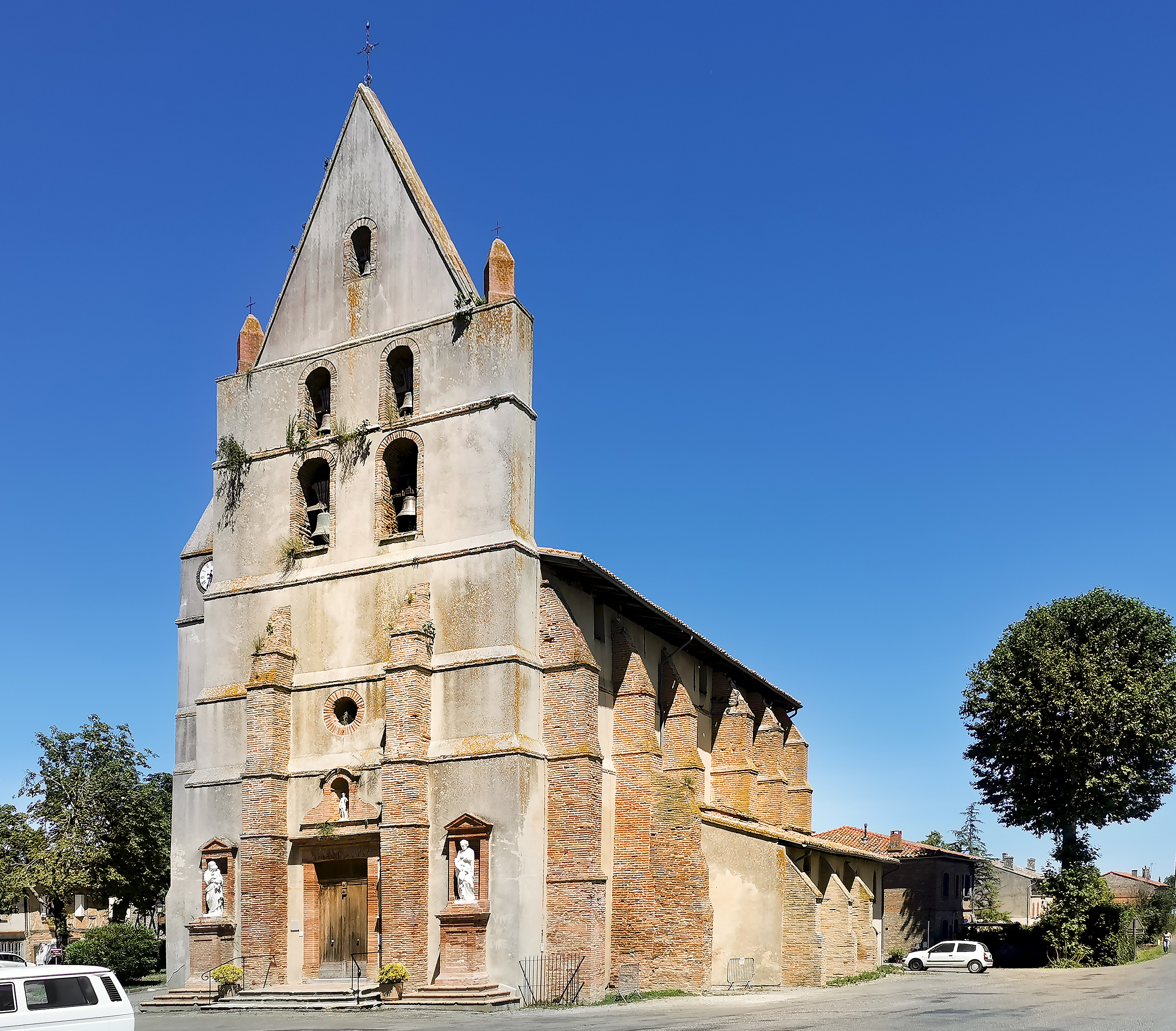
The church Saint-Jean-Baptiste

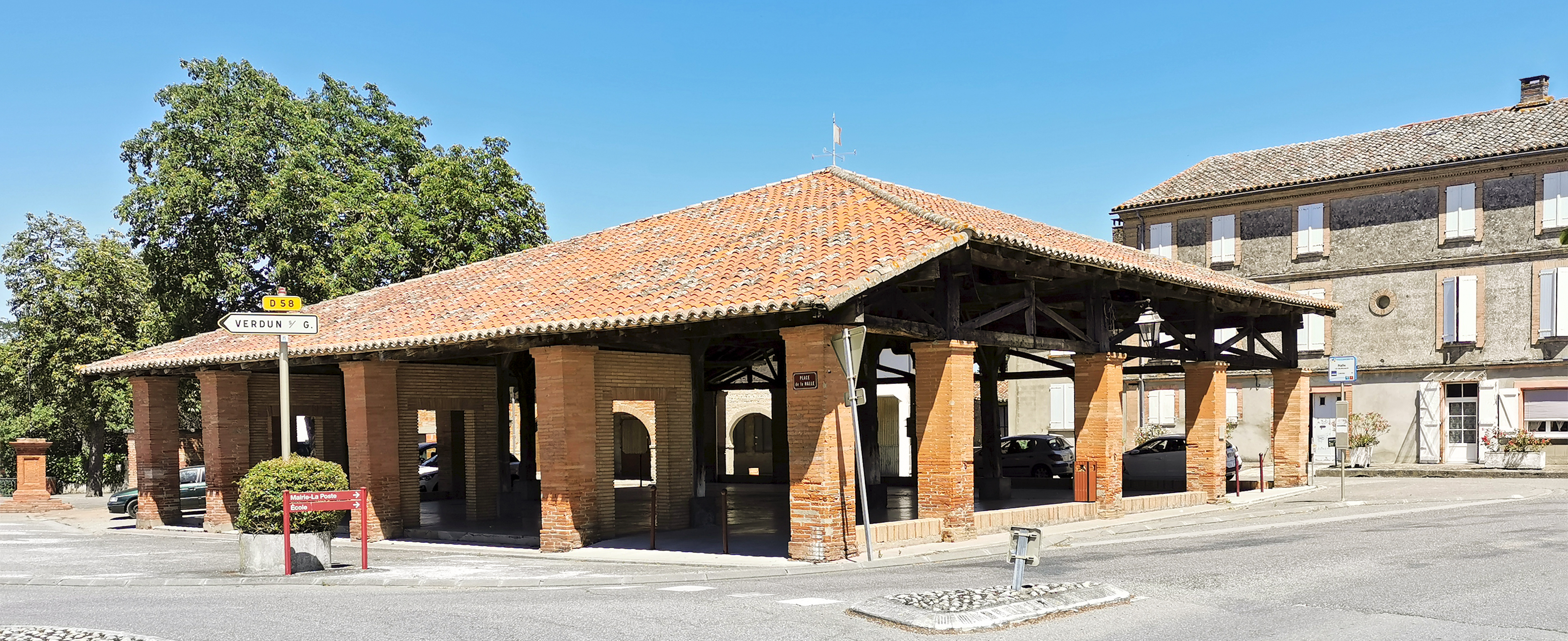
The covered market

== See also ==
- Communes of the Haute-Garonne department
