= Ondes =

- Commune
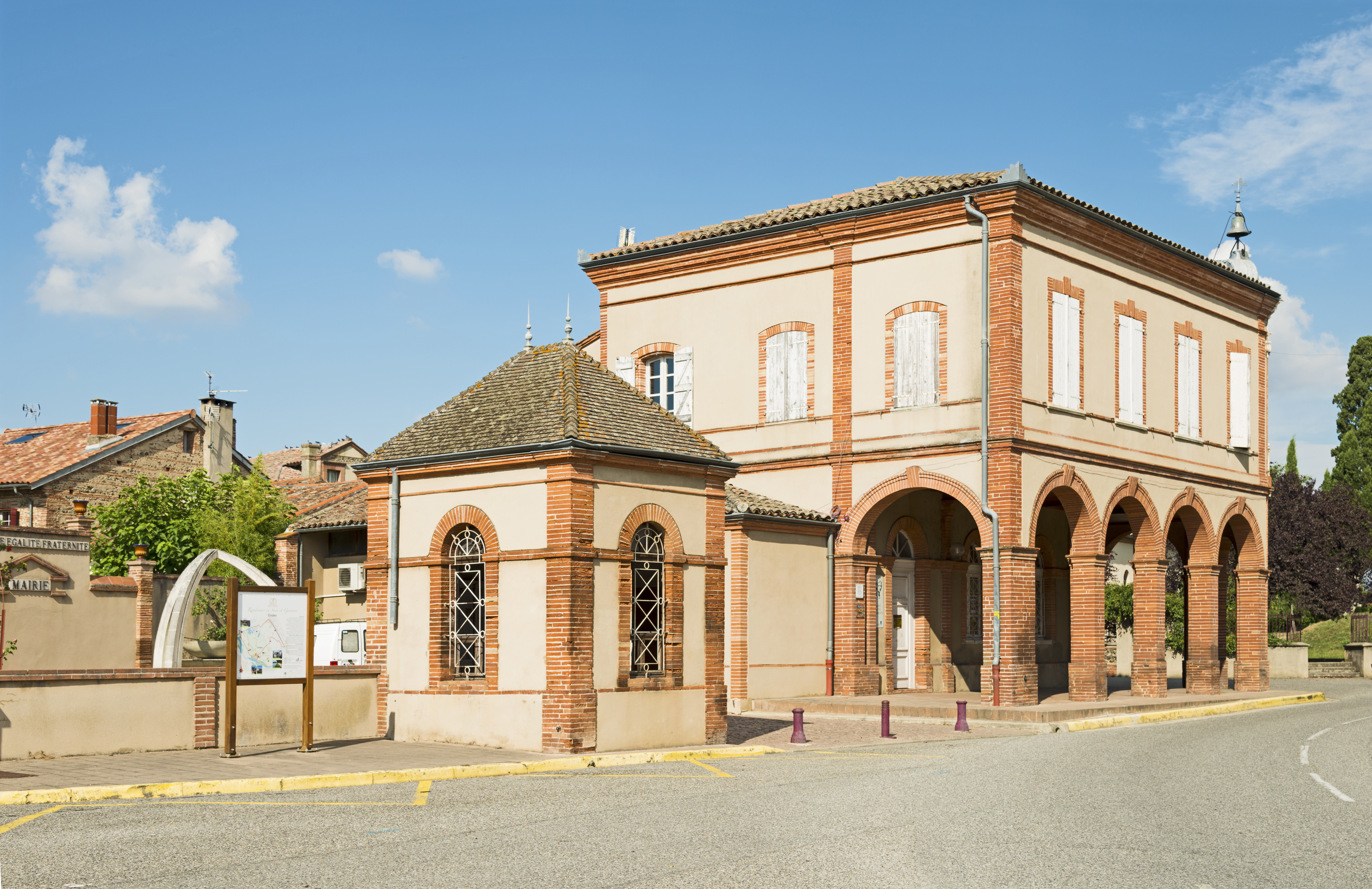
- Town hall

- Coat of arms
- Location of Ondes
- Location within France Location within Occitanie
- Coordinates: 43°46′55″N 1°18′36″E
- Country: France
- Region: Occitania
- Department: Haute-Garonne
- Arrondissement: Toulouse
- Canton: Léguevin

Government
  - Mayor (2020–2026): André Pavan
- Area^{1}: 6.57 km^{2} (2.54 sq mi)
- Elevation: 109 m (358 ft)
- Highest elevation: 111 m (364 ft)
- Lowest elevation: 102 m (335 ft)
- Population (2023): 822
  - Density: 125/km^{2} (324/sq mi)
- Time zone: UTC+01:00 (CET)
  - Summer (DST): UTC+02:00 (CEST)
- INSEE/Postal code: 31403 /31330
- ^{1} French Land Register data, which excludes lakes, ponds, glaciers > 1 km^{2} (0.386 sq mi or 247 acres) and river estuaries.

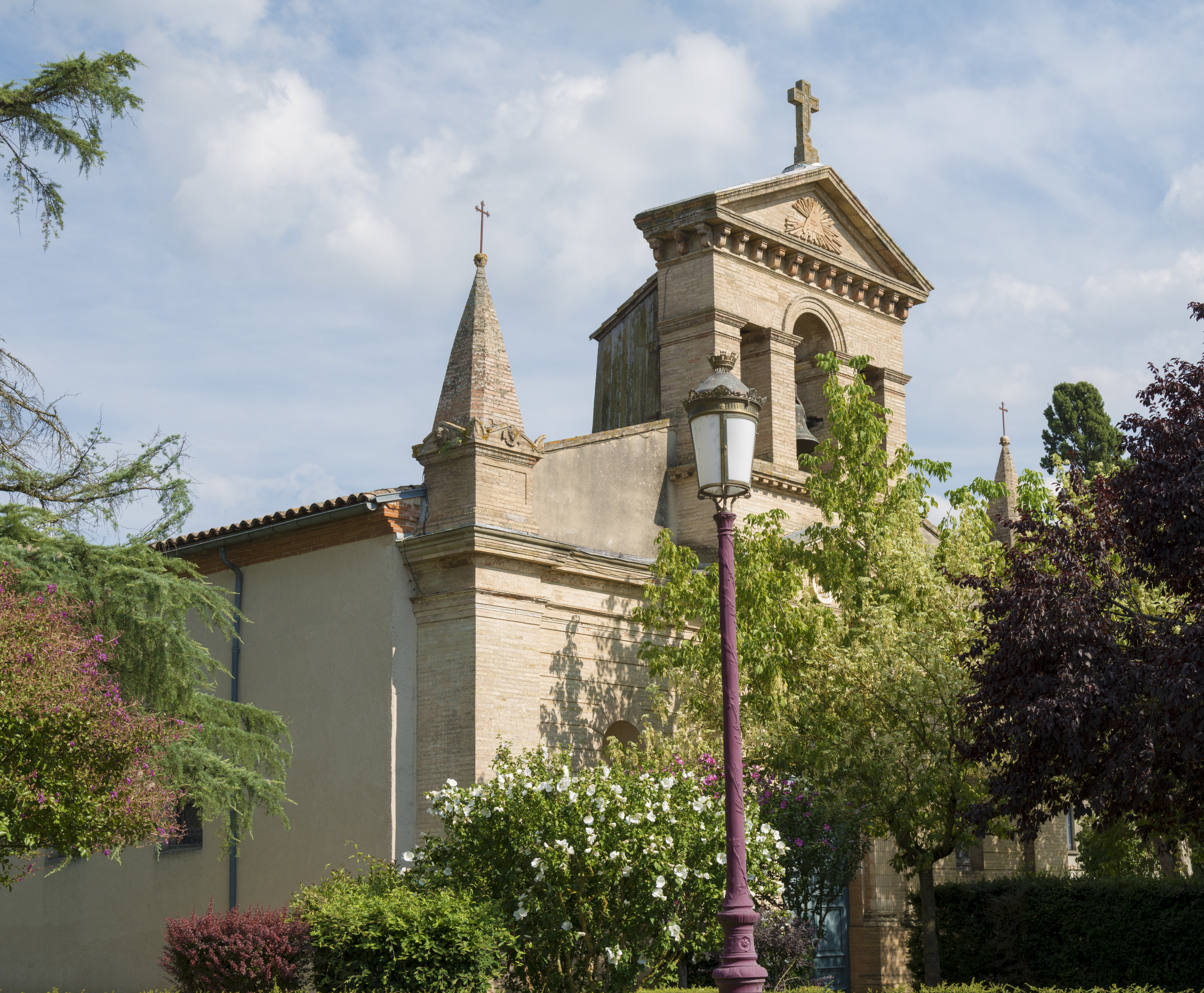
Church St. John the Baptist

Ondes (French pronunciation: [ɔ̃d]; Occitan: Ondas) is a commune in the Haute-Garonne department in southwestern France near Toulouse.

== Population ==
Historical population
Year	Pop.	±% p.a.
1968	411	—
1975	386	−0.89%
1982	402	+0.58%
1990	478	+2.19%
1999	681	+4.01%
2007	723	+0.75%
2012	706	−0.47%
2017	733	+0.75%
2023	822	+1.93%
Source: INSEE

== See also ==
- Communes of the Haute-Garonne department
