= Puysségur =

- Commune
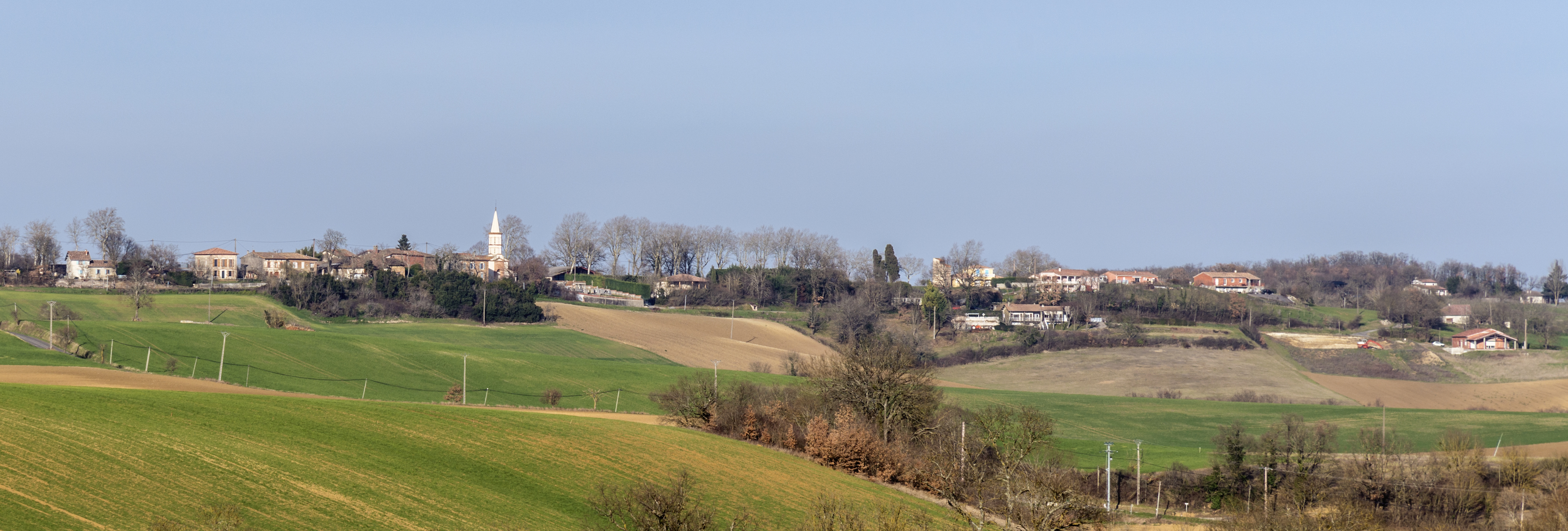
- A general view of Puysségur
- Location of Puysségur
- Location within France Location within Occitanie
- Coordinates: 43°44′57″N 1°03′47″E
- Country: France
- Region: Occitania
- Department: Haute-Garonne
- Arrondissement: Toulouse
- Canton: Léguevin
- Intercommunality: Hauts Tolosans

Government
  - Mayor (2020–2026): Arlette Ferreri
- Area^{1}: 5.44 km^{2} (2.10 sq mi)
- Elevation: 300 m (980 ft)
- Highest elevation: 292 m (958 ft)
- Lowest elevation: 170 m (560 ft)
- Population (2023): 140
  - Density: 26/km^{2} (67/sq mi)
- Time zone: UTC+01:00 (CET)
  - Summer (DST): UTC+02:00 (CEST)
- INSEE/Postal code: 31444 /31480
- ^{1} French Land Register data, which excludes lakes, ponds, glaciers > 1 km^{2} (0.386 sq mi or 247 acres) and river estuaries.

Puysségur (French pronunciation: [pɥiseɡyʁ]; Occitan: Poisigur) is a commune in the Haute-Garonne department in southwestern France.

== Population ==
Historical population
Year	Pop.	±% p.a.
1968	52	—
1975	58	+1.57%
1982	58	+0.00%
1990	70	+2.38%
1999	70	+0.00%
2007	100	+4.56%
2012	133	+5.87%
2017	147	+2.02%
2023	140	−0.81%
Source: INSEE

== See also ==
- Communes of the Haute-Garonne department
