= Laréole =

- Commune
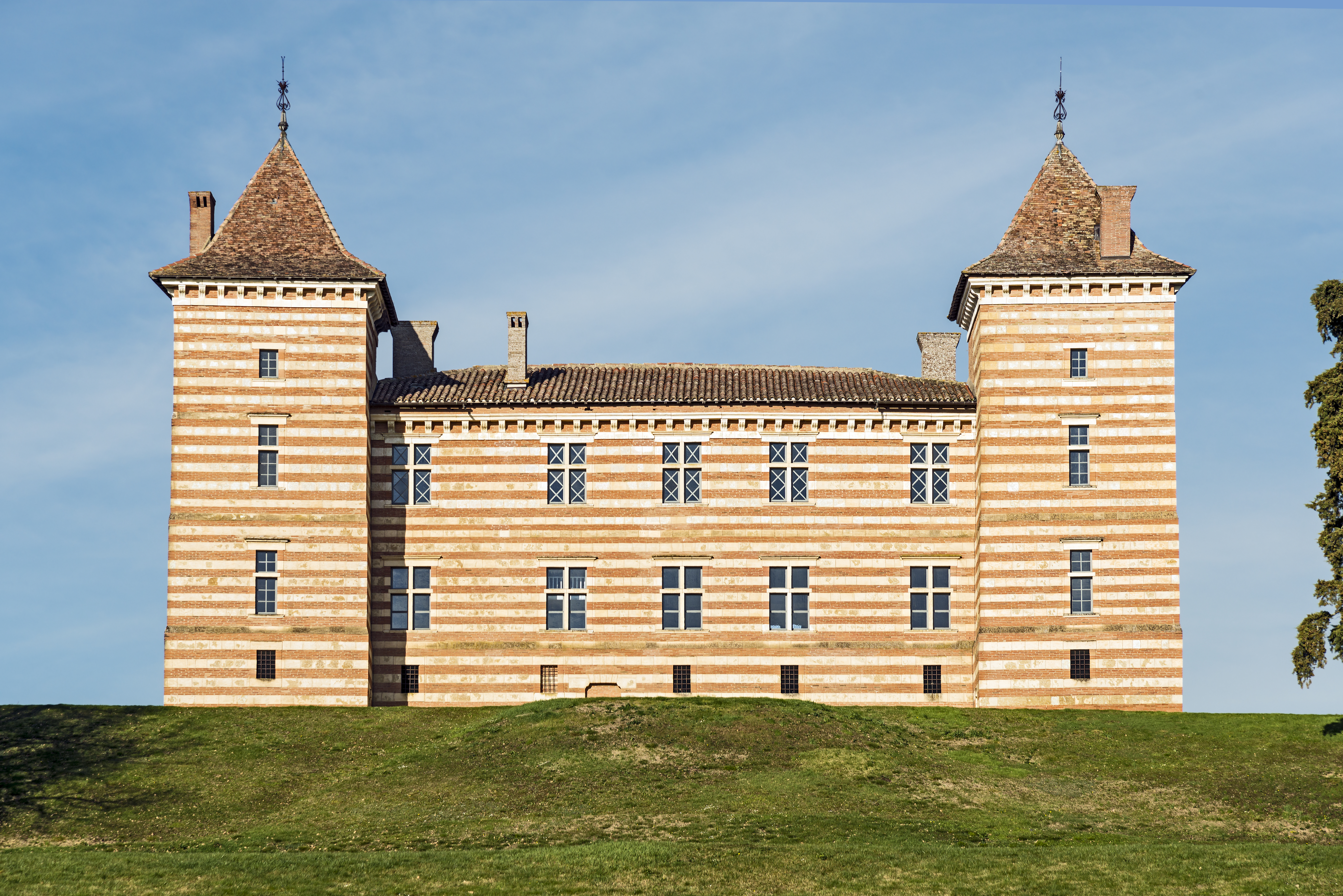
- The chateau in Laréole
- Location of Laréole
- Location within France Location within Occitanie
- Coordinates: 43°44′20″N 1°01′23″E
- Country: France
- Region: Occitania
- Department: Haute-Garonne
- Arrondissement: Toulouse
- Canton: Léguevin
- Intercommunality: Hauts Tolosans

Government
  - Mayor (2020–2026): Fabien Gauthe
- Area^{1}: 8.88 km^{2} (3.43 sq mi)
- Elevation: 235 m (771 ft)
- Highest elevation: 272 m (892 ft)
- Lowest elevation: 135 m (443 ft)
- Population (2023): 157
  - Density: 17.7/km^{2} (45.8/sq mi)
- Time zone: UTC+01:00 (CET)
  - Summer (DST): UTC+02:00 (CEST)
- INSEE/Postal code: 31275 /31480
- ^{1} French Land Register data, which excludes lakes, ponds, glaciers > 1 km^{2} (0.386 sq mi or 247 acres) and river estuaries.

Laréole (French pronunciation: [laʁeɔl]; Occitan: La Reula) is a commune in the Haute-Garonne department in southwestern France.

== Population ==
Historical population
Year	Pop.	±% p.a.
1968	152	—
1975	146	−0.57%
1982	138	−0.80%
1990	114	−2.36%
1999	122	+0.76%
2007	135	+1.27%
2012	149	+1.99%
2017	171	+2.79%
2023	157	−1.41%
Source: INSEE

== Monuments ==
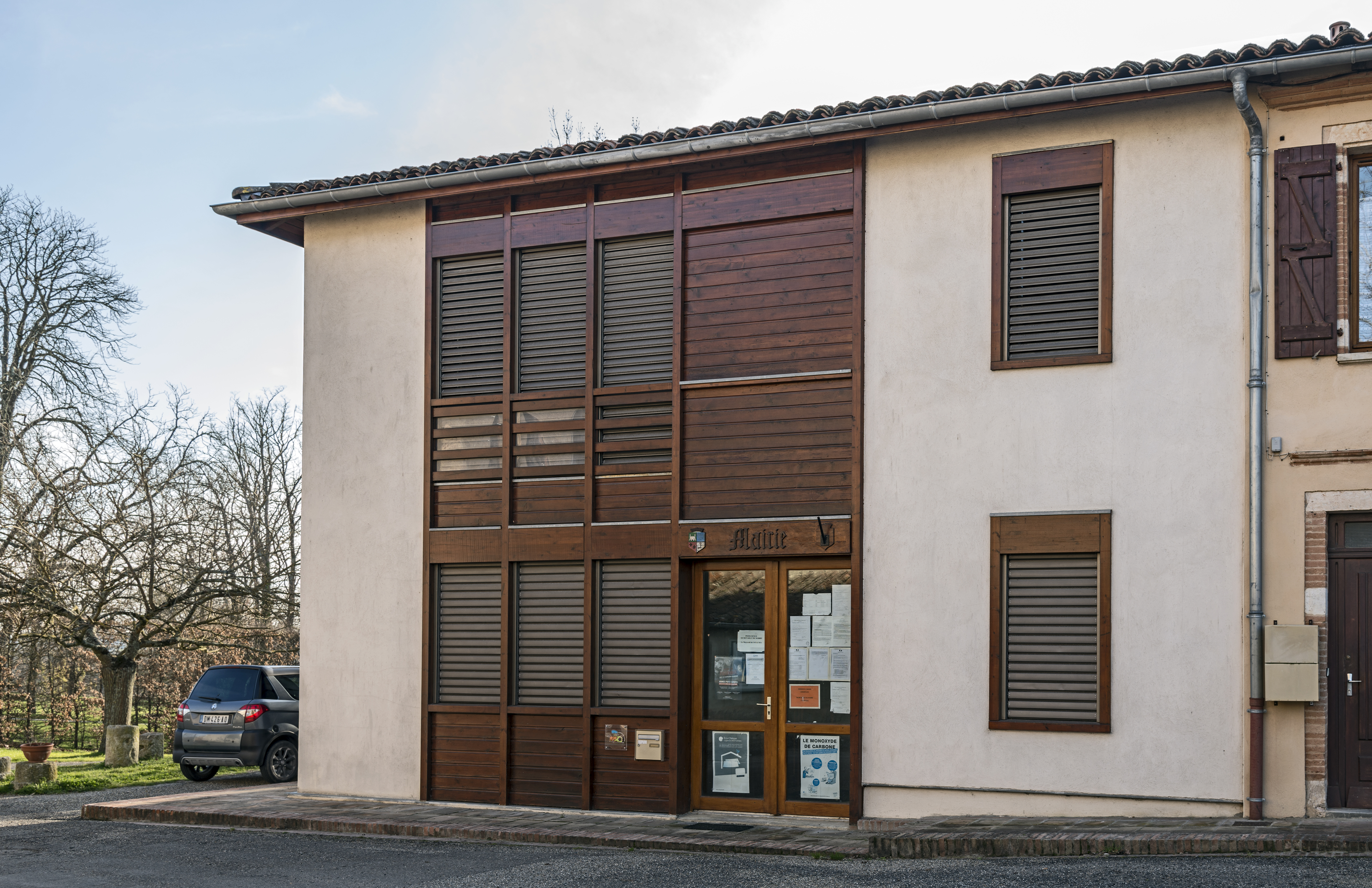
The town hall; The church; The castle

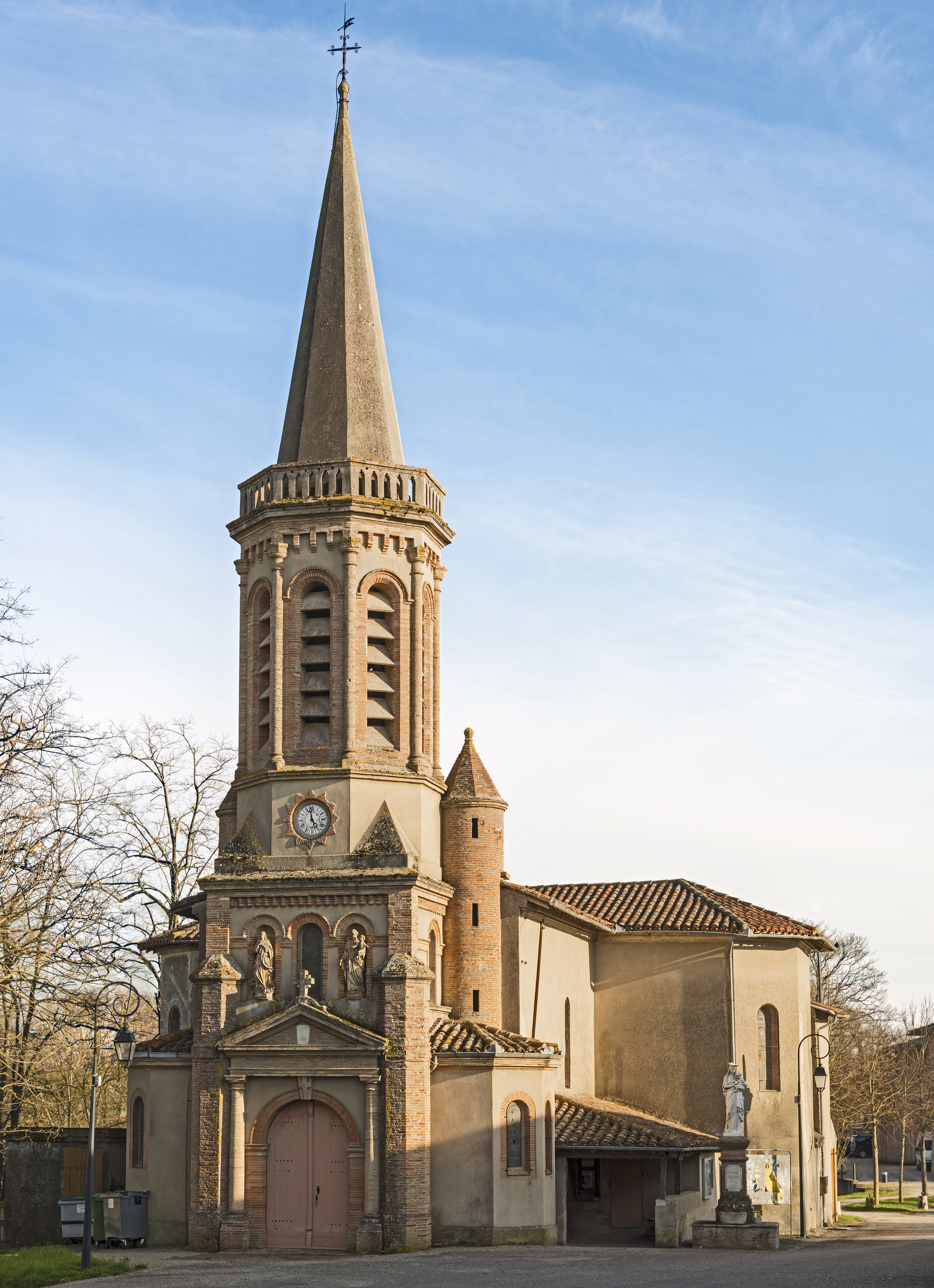
The church Notre-Dame;

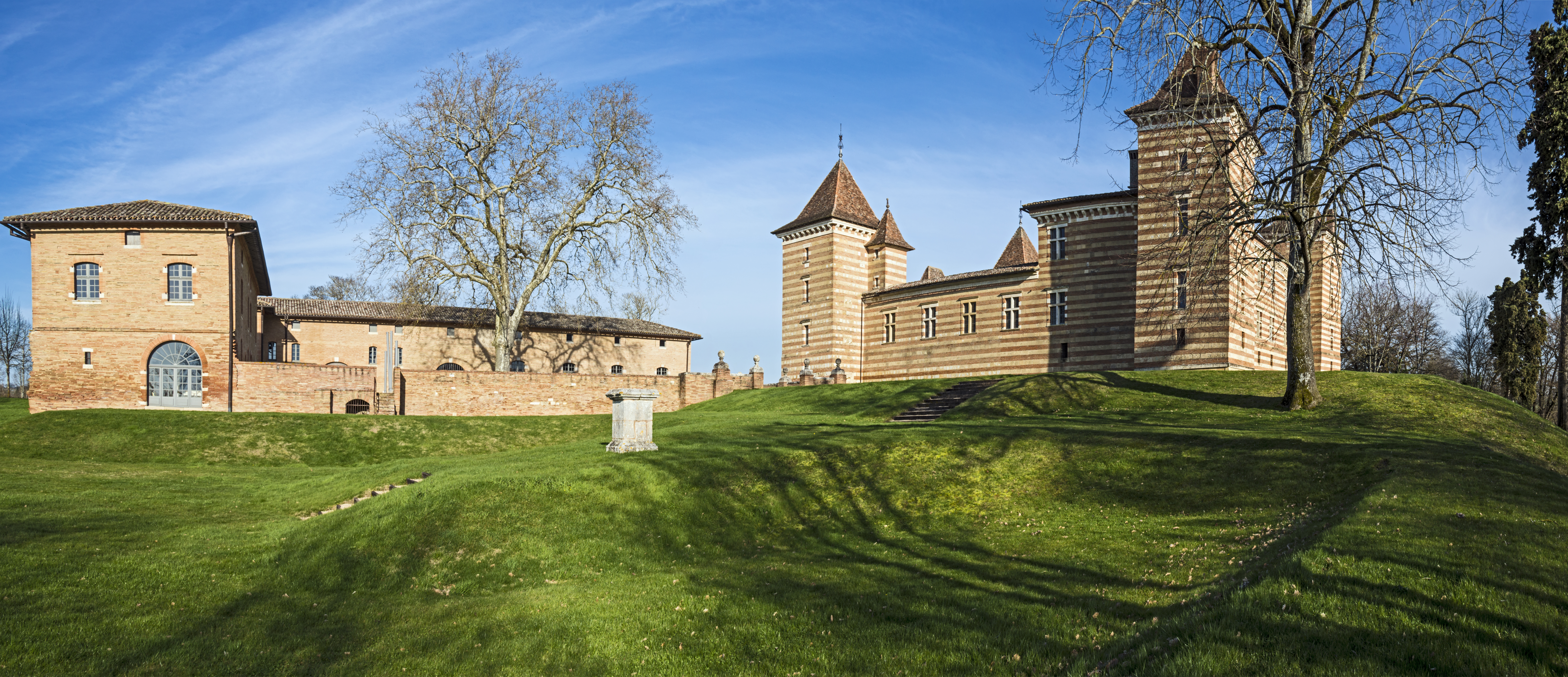
The castle

== See also ==
- Communes of the Haute-Garonne department
