= Saint-Cézert =

- Commune
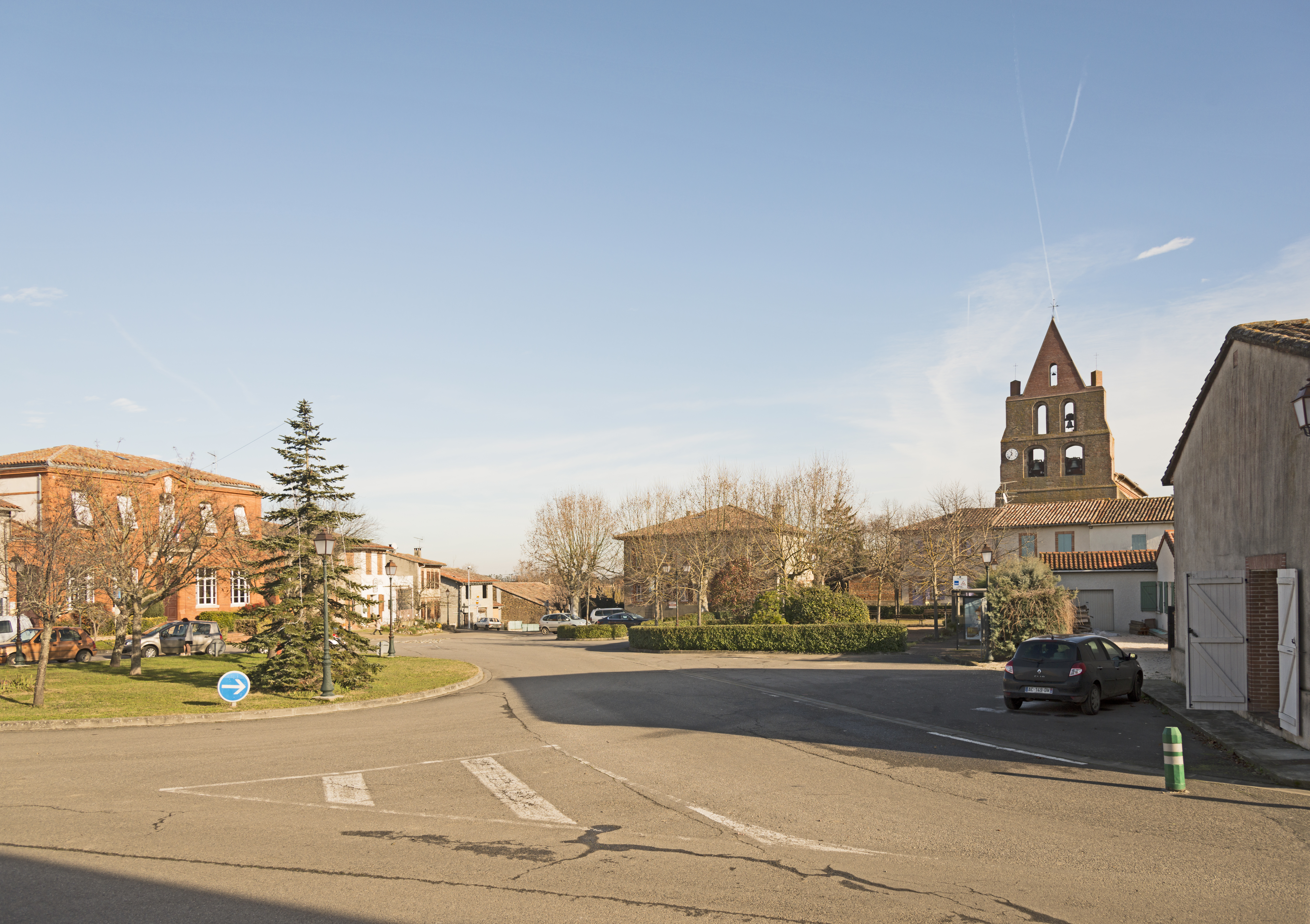
- The village square in Saint-Cézert
- Location of Saint-Cézert
- Location within France Location within Occitanie
- Coordinates: 43°46′57″N 1°11′43″E
- Country: France
- Region: Occitania
- Department: Haute-Garonne
- Arrondissement: Toulouse
- Canton: Léguevin

Government
  - Mayor (2020–2026): Henri Oliveira Soares
- Area^{1}: 8.94 km^{2} (3.45 sq mi)
- Elevation: 160 m (520 ft)
- Highest elevation: 173 m (568 ft)
- Lowest elevation: 125 m (410 ft)
- Population (2023): 447
  - Density: 50.0/km^{2} (129/sq mi)
- Time zone: UTC+01:00 (CET)
  - Summer (DST): UTC+02:00 (CEST)
- INSEE/Postal code: 31473 /31330
- ^{1} French Land Register data, which excludes lakes, ponds, glaciers > 1 km^{2} (0.386 sq mi or 247 acres) and river estuaries.

Saint-Cézert (French pronunciation: [sɛ̃ sezɛʁ]; Occitan: Sent Cesèrt) is a commune in the Haute-Garonne department in southwestern France.

== Population ==
Historical population
Year	Pop.	±% p.a.
1968	221	—
1975	188	−2.28%
1982	329	+8.32%
1990	402	+2.54%
1999	413	+0.30%
2007	341	−2.37%
2012	411	+3.80%
2017	434	+1.09%
2023	447	+0.49%
Source: INSEE

== Sights ==
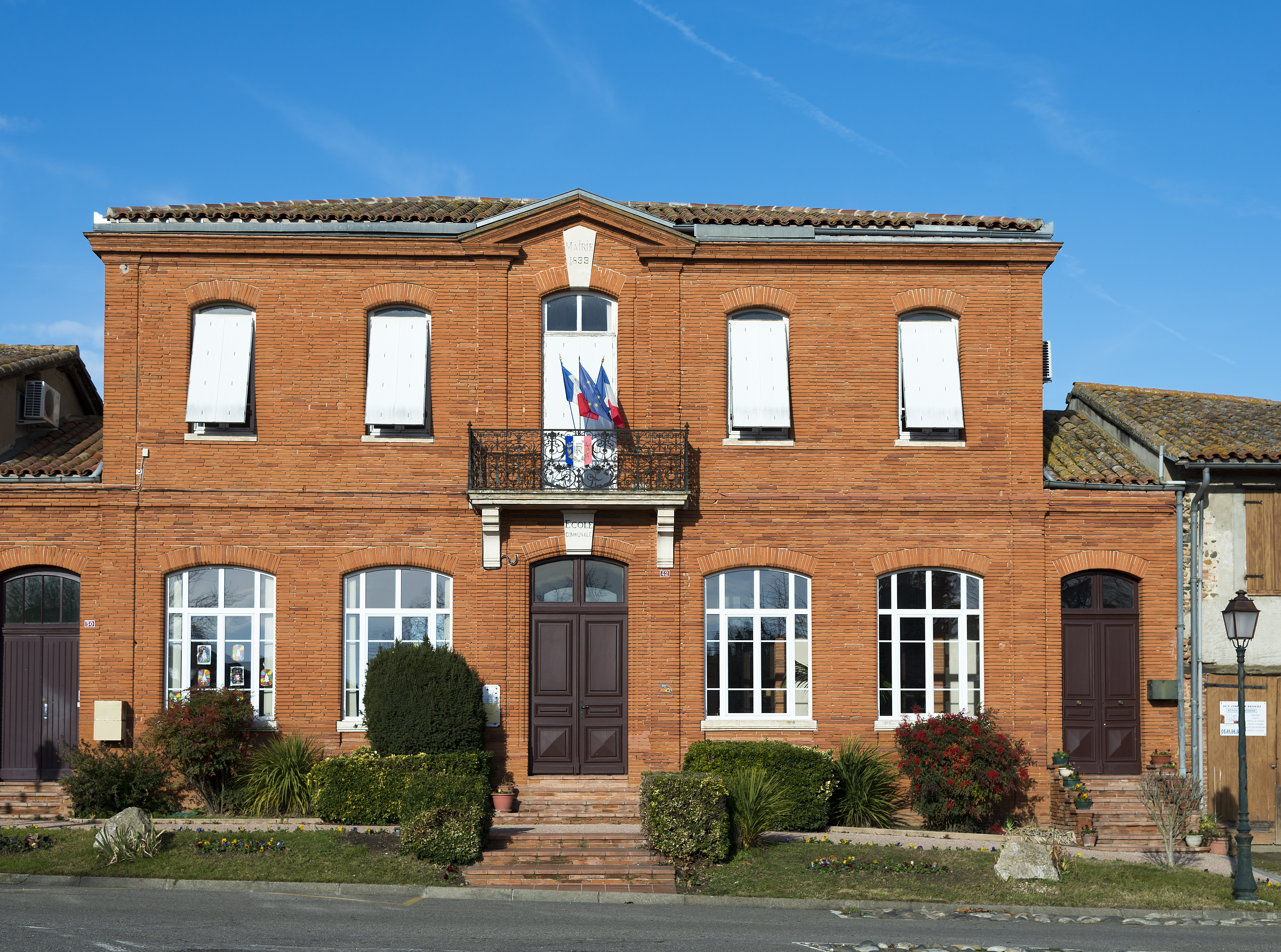
Town hall

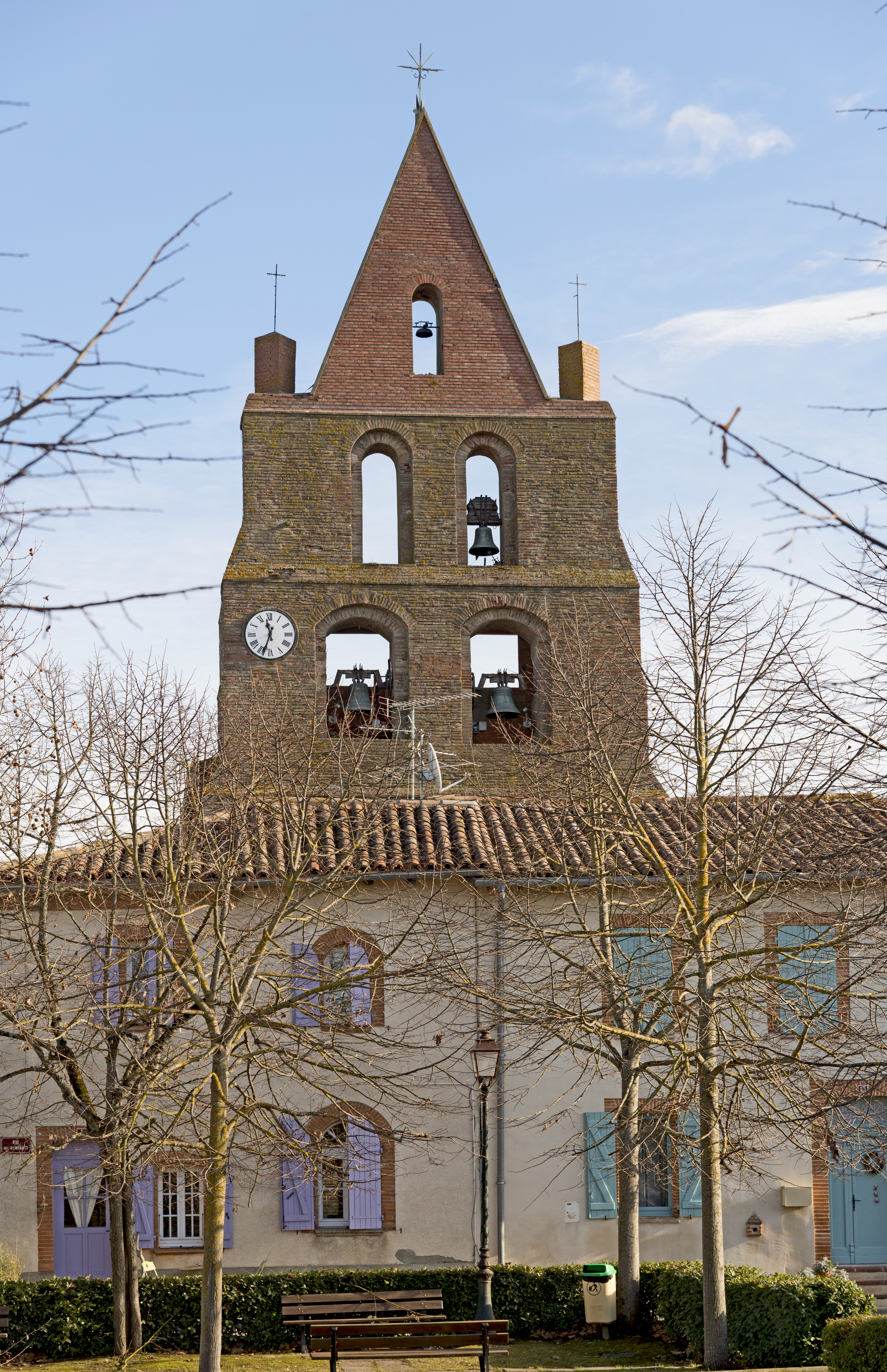
Church

== See also ==
- Communes of the Haute-Garonne department
