= Drudas =

- Commune
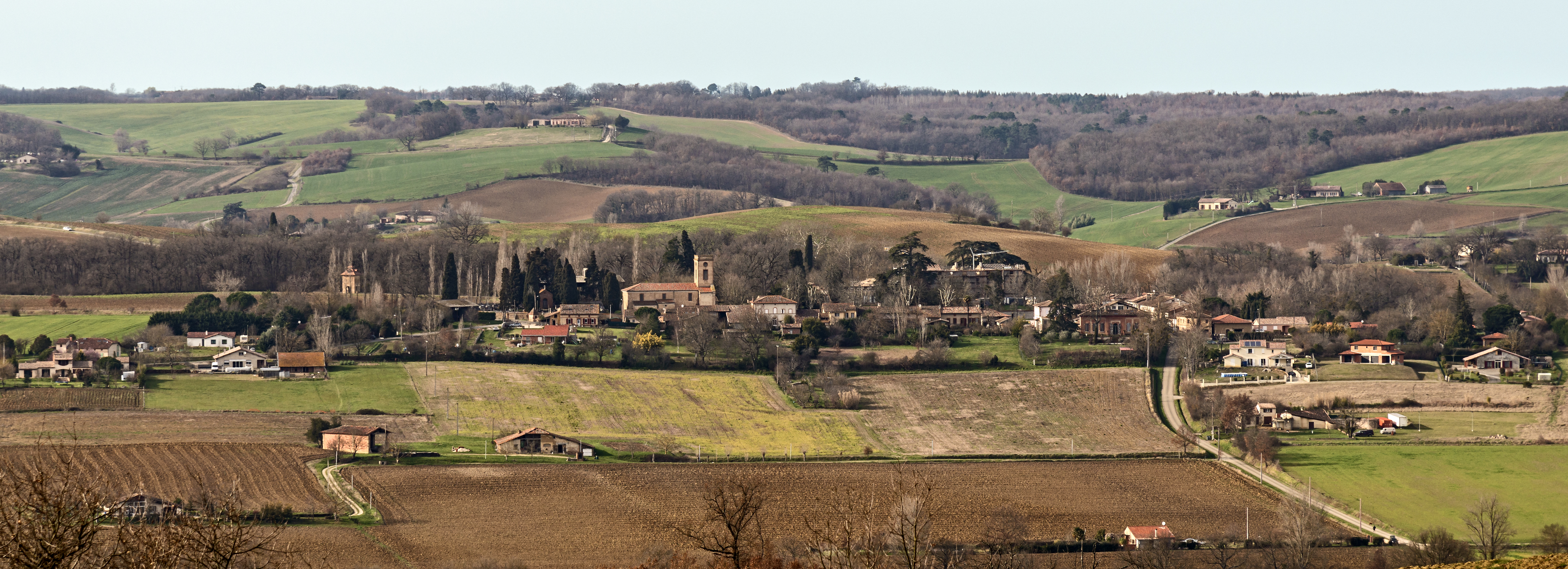
- A general view of Drudas
- Location of Drudas
- Location within France Location within Occitanie
- Coordinates: 43°45′18″N 1°06′01″E
- Country: France
- Region: Occitania
- Department: Haute-Garonne
- Arrondissement: Toulouse
- Canton: Léguevin
- Intercommunality: Hauts Tolosans

Government
  - Mayor (2020–2026): Denis Dulong
- Area^{1}: 11.17 km^{2} (4.31 sq mi)
- Elevation: 200 m (660 ft)
- Highest elevation: 274 m (899 ft)
- Lowest elevation: 157 m (515 ft)
- Population (2023): 206
  - Density: 18.4/km^{2} (47.8/sq mi)
- Time zone: UTC+01:00 (CET)
  - Summer (DST): UTC+02:00 (CEST)
- INSEE/Postal code: 31164 /31480
- ^{1} French Land Register data, which excludes lakes, ponds, glaciers > 1 km^{2} (0.386 sq mi or 247 acres) and river estuaries.

Drudas (French pronunciation: [dʁydas]; Occitan: Drudàs) is a commune in the Haute-Garonne department in southwestern France.

== Population ==
Historical population
Year	Pop.	±% p.a.
1968	153	—
1975	147	−0.57%
1982	137	−1.00%
1990	138	+0.09%
1999	172	+2.48%
2007	181	+0.64%
2012	190	+0.98%
2017	216	+2.60%
2023	206	−0.79%
Source: INSEE

== See also ==
- Communes of the Haute-Garonne department
