= Lagraulet-Saint-Nicolas =

- Commune
- Coat of arms
- Location of Lagraulet-Saint-Nicolas
- Location within France Location within Occitanie
- Coordinates: 43°47′41″N 1°04′47″E
- Country: France
- Region: Occitania
- Department: Haute-Garonne
- Arrondissement: Toulouse
- Canton: Léguevin
- Intercommunality: Hauts Tolosans

Government
  - Mayor (2024–2026): Christine Senocq
- Area^{1}: 16.11 km^{2} (6.22 sq mi)
- Elevation: 271 m (889 ft)
- Highest elevation: 287 m (942 ft)
- Lowest elevation: 168 m (551 ft)
- Population (2023): 284
  - Density: 17.6/km^{2} (45.7/sq mi)
- Time zone: UTC+01:00 (CET)
  - Summer (DST): UTC+02:00 (CEST)
- INSEE/Postal code: 31265 /31480
- ^{1} French Land Register data, which excludes lakes, ponds, glaciers > 1 km^{2} (0.386 sq mi or 247 acres) and river estuaries.

Lagraulet-Saint-Nicolas (French pronunciation: [laɡʁolɛ sɛ̃ nikɔla]; Occitan: L'Agraulet Sent Nicolau) is a commune in the Haute-Garonne department in southwestern France.

== Population ==
Historical population
Year	Pop.	±% p.a.
1968	209	—
1975	161	−3.66%
1982	152	−0.82%
1990	163	+0.88%
1999	145	−1.29%
2007	204	+4.36%
2012	262	+5.13%
2017	251	−0.85%
2023	284	+2.08%
Source: INSEE

== See also ==
- Communes of the Haute-Garonne department
