= Pelleport =

- Commune
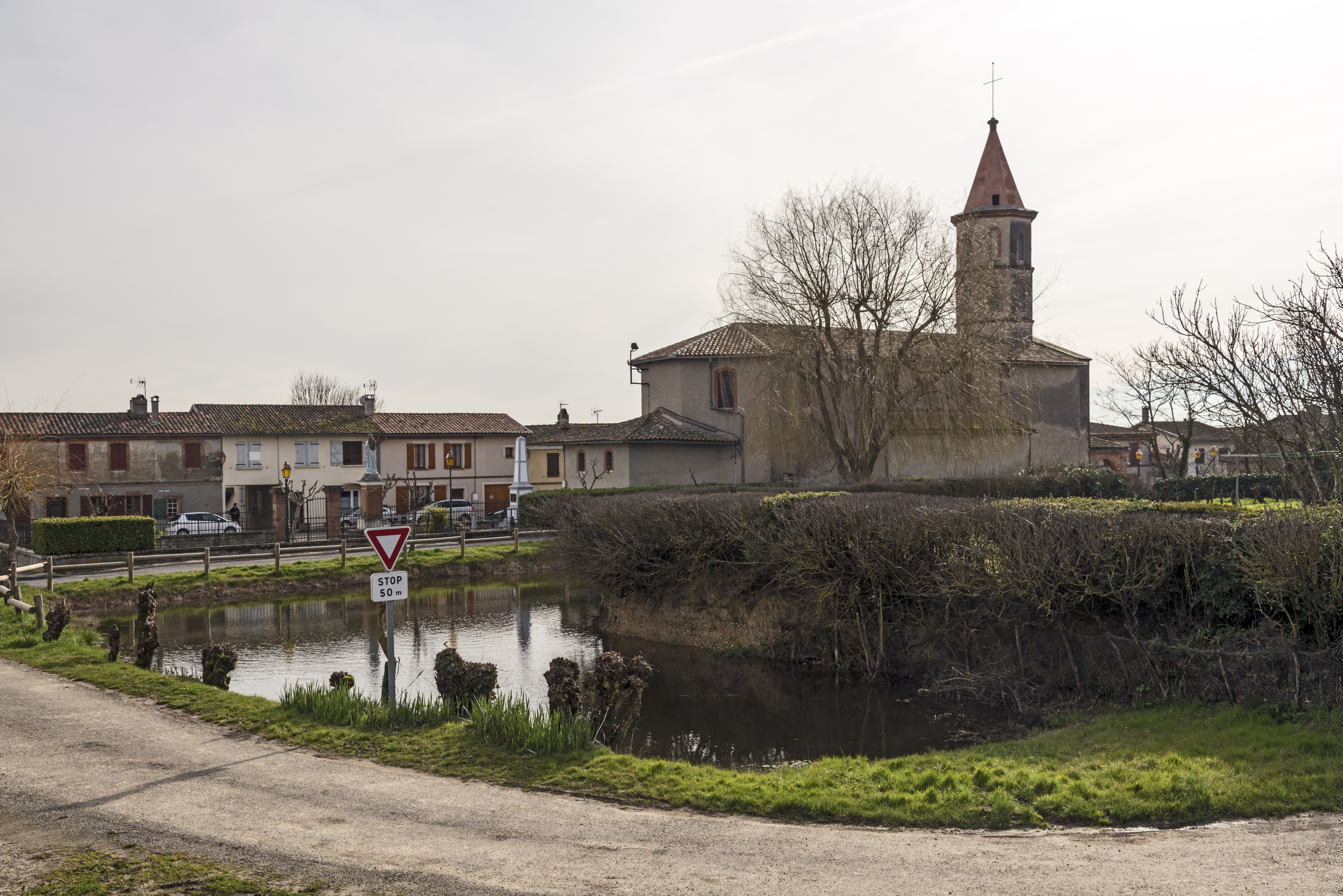
- The church and surroundings in Pelleport

- Coat of arms
- Location of Pelleport
- Location within France Location within Occitanie
- Coordinates: 43°44′22″N 1°07′03″E
- Country: France
- Region: Occitania
- Department: Haute-Garonne
- Arrondissement: Toulouse
- Canton: Léguevin
- Intercommunality: Hauts Tolosans

Government
  - Mayor (2023–2026): Philippe Lasuye
- Area^{1}: 10.38 km^{2} (4.01 sq mi)
- Elevation: 270 m (890 ft)
- Highest elevation: 275 m (902 ft)
- Lowest elevation: 157 m (515 ft)
- Population (2023): 545
  - Density: 52.5/km^{2} (136/sq mi)
- Time zone: UTC+01:00 (CET)
  - Summer (DST): UTC+02:00 (CEST)
- INSEE/Postal code: 31413 /31480
- ^{1} French Land Register data, which excludes lakes, ponds, glaciers > 1 km^{2} (0.386 sq mi or 247 acres) and river estuaries.

Pelleport (French pronunciation: [pɛlpɔʁ]; Occitan: Pelapòrc) is a commune in the Haute-Garonne department in southwestern France.

== Monuments ==
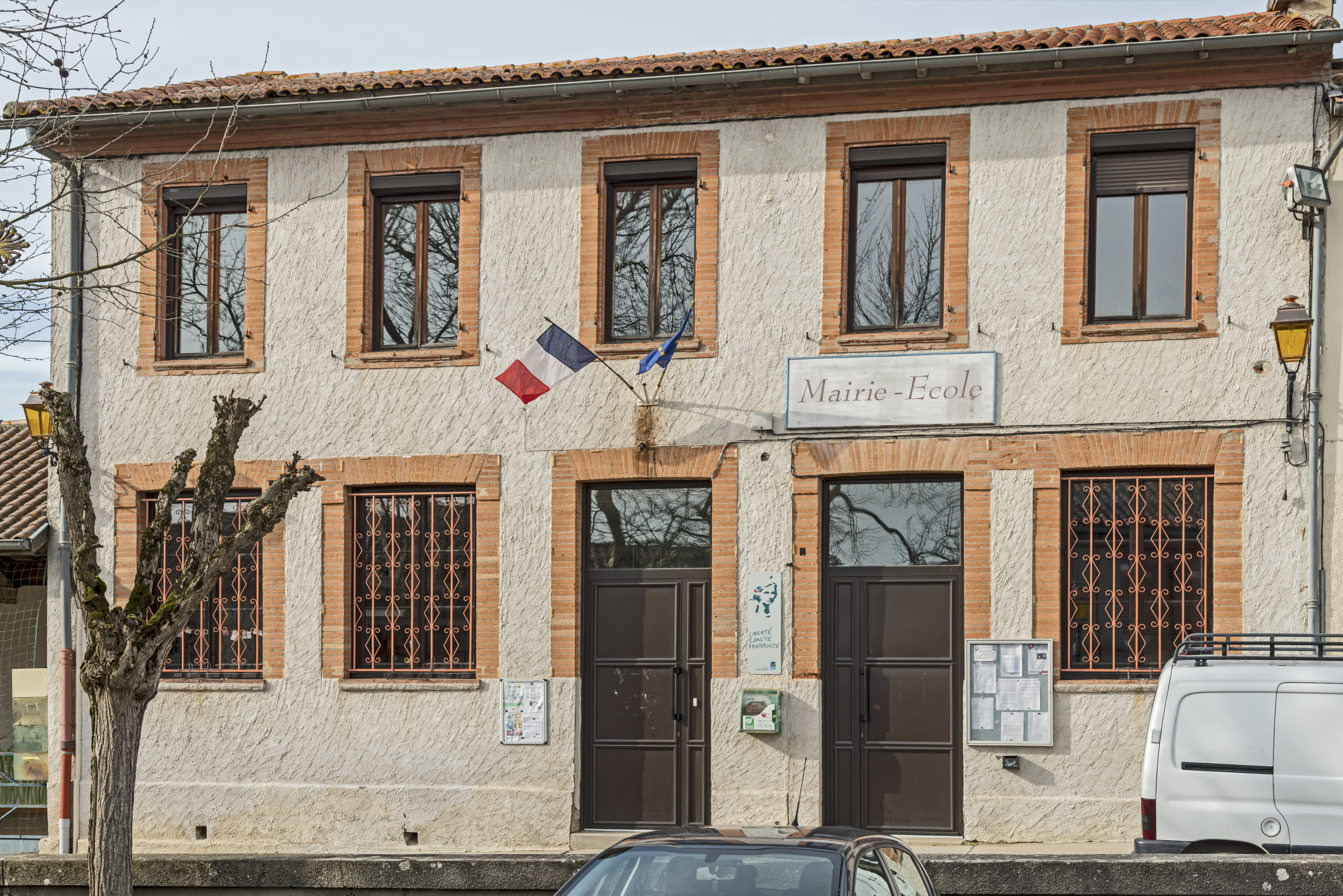
The town hall.

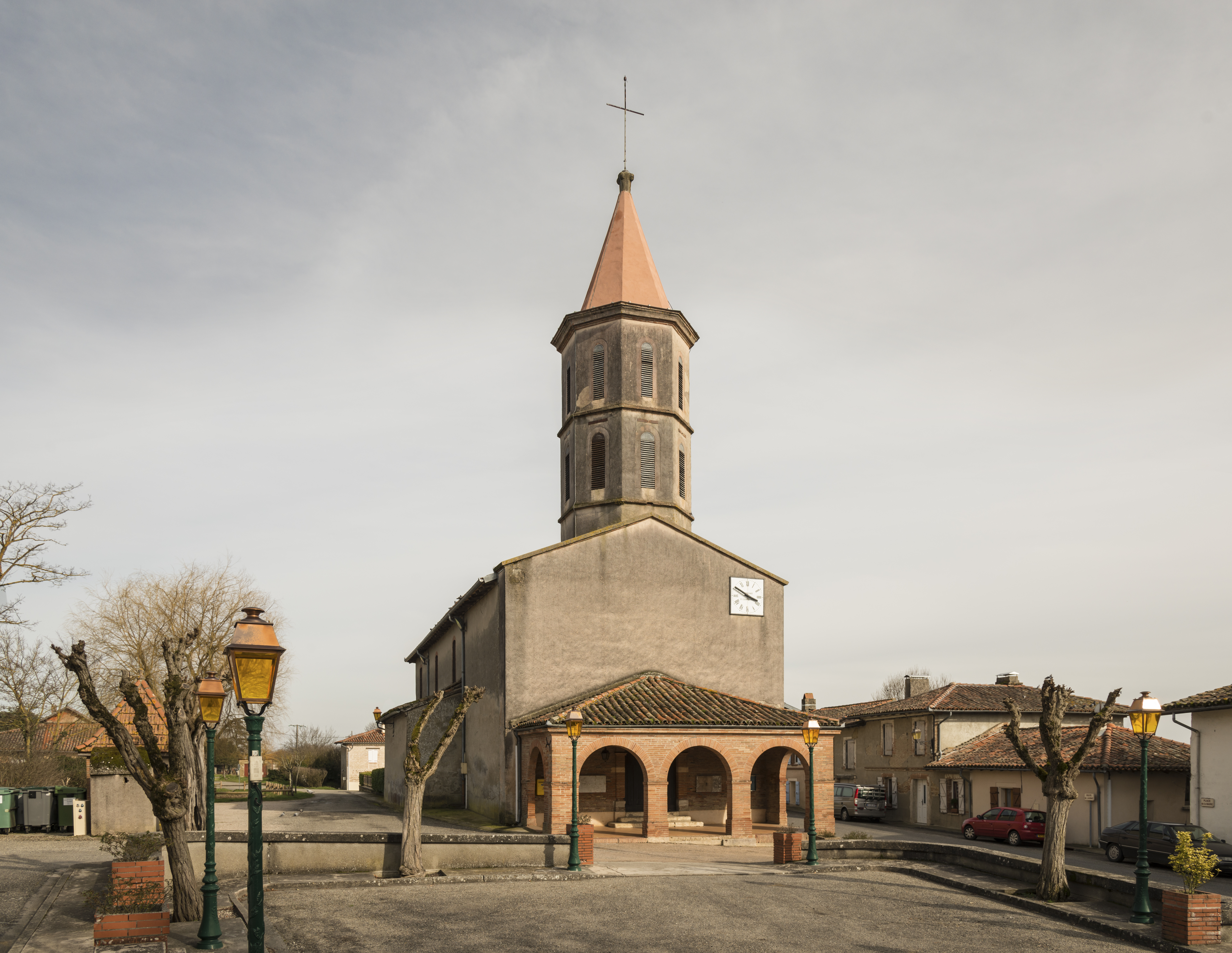
The church.

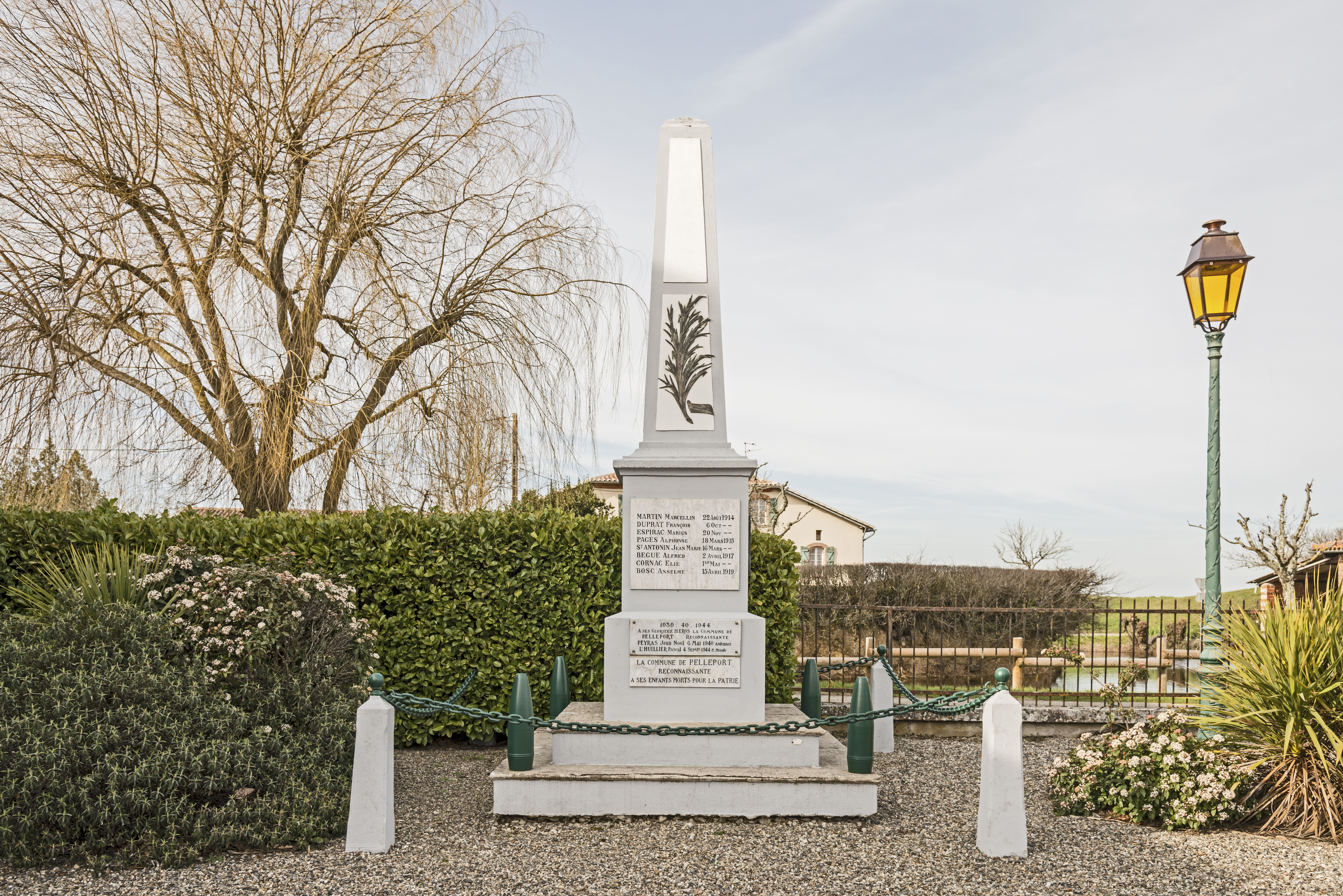
The War Memorial.

== Population ==
Historical population
| Year | Pop. | ±% p.a. |
|---|---|---|
| 1968 | 176 | — |
| 1975 | 163 | −1.09% |
| 1982 | 221 | +4.44% |
| 1990 | 310 | +4.32% |
| 1999 | 344 | +1.16% |
| 2007 | 480 | +4.25% |
| 2012 | 531 | +2.04% |
| 2017 | 515 | −0.61% |
| 2023 | 545 | +0.95% |
Source: INSEE

== See also ==
- Communes of the Haute-Garonne department
