= Léguevin =

Léguevin Legavin (Occitan)
- Commune
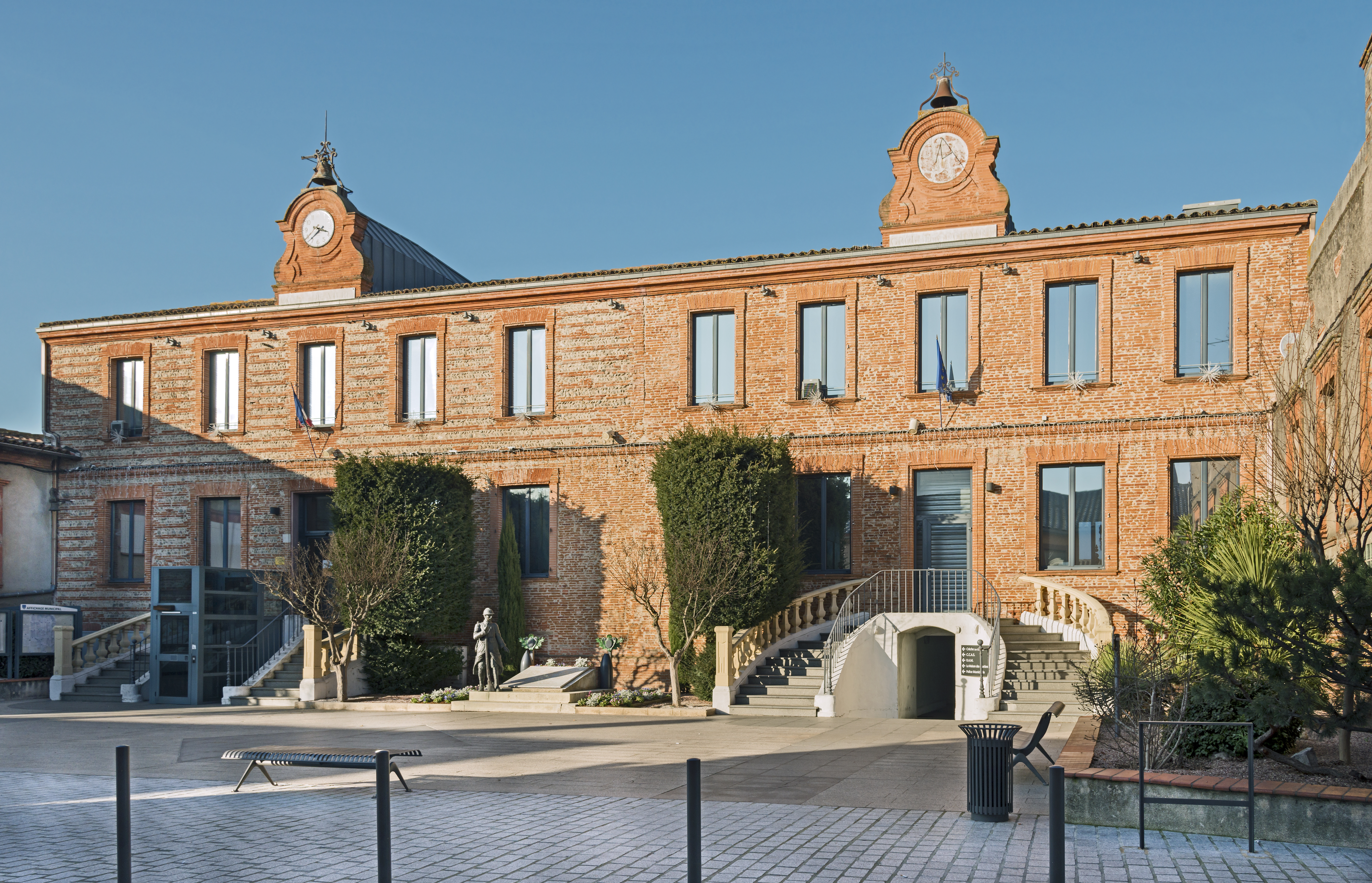
- Town hall

- Coat of arms
- Location of Léguevin
- Location within France Location within Occitanie
- Coordinates: 43°35′59″N 1°14′02″E
- Country: France
- Region: Occitania
- Department: Haute-Garonne
- Arrondissement: Toulouse
- Canton: Léguevin
- Intercommunality: CC Le Grand Ouest Toulousain

Government
  - Mayor (2020–2026): Étienne Cardeilhac-Pugens
- Area^{1}: 24.45 km^{2} (9.44 sq mi)
- Highest elevation: 237 m (778 ft)
- Lowest elevation: 164 m (538 ft)
- Population (2023): 9,945
  - Density: 406.7/km^{2} (1,053/sq mi)
- Demonym: Léguevinoises et Léguevinois
- Time zone: UTC+01:00 (CET)
  - Summer (DST): UTC+02:00 (CEST)
- INSEE/Postal code: 31291 /31490
- ^{1} French Land Register data, which excludes lakes, ponds, glaciers > 1 km^{2} (0.386 sq mi or 247 acres) and river estuaries.

Léguevin (French pronunciation: [leɡvɛ̃]; Occitan: Legavin) is a commune in the Haute-Garonne department in southwestern France.

== Population ==
Historical population
Year	Pop.	±% p.a.
1968	1,622	—
1975	2,091	+3.69%
1982	2,764	+4.07%
1990	4,217	+5.42%
1999	6,172	+4.32%
2007	7,668	+2.75%
2012	8,629	+2.39%
2017	9,196	+1.28%
2023	9,945	+1.31%
Source: INSEE

== Monuments ==
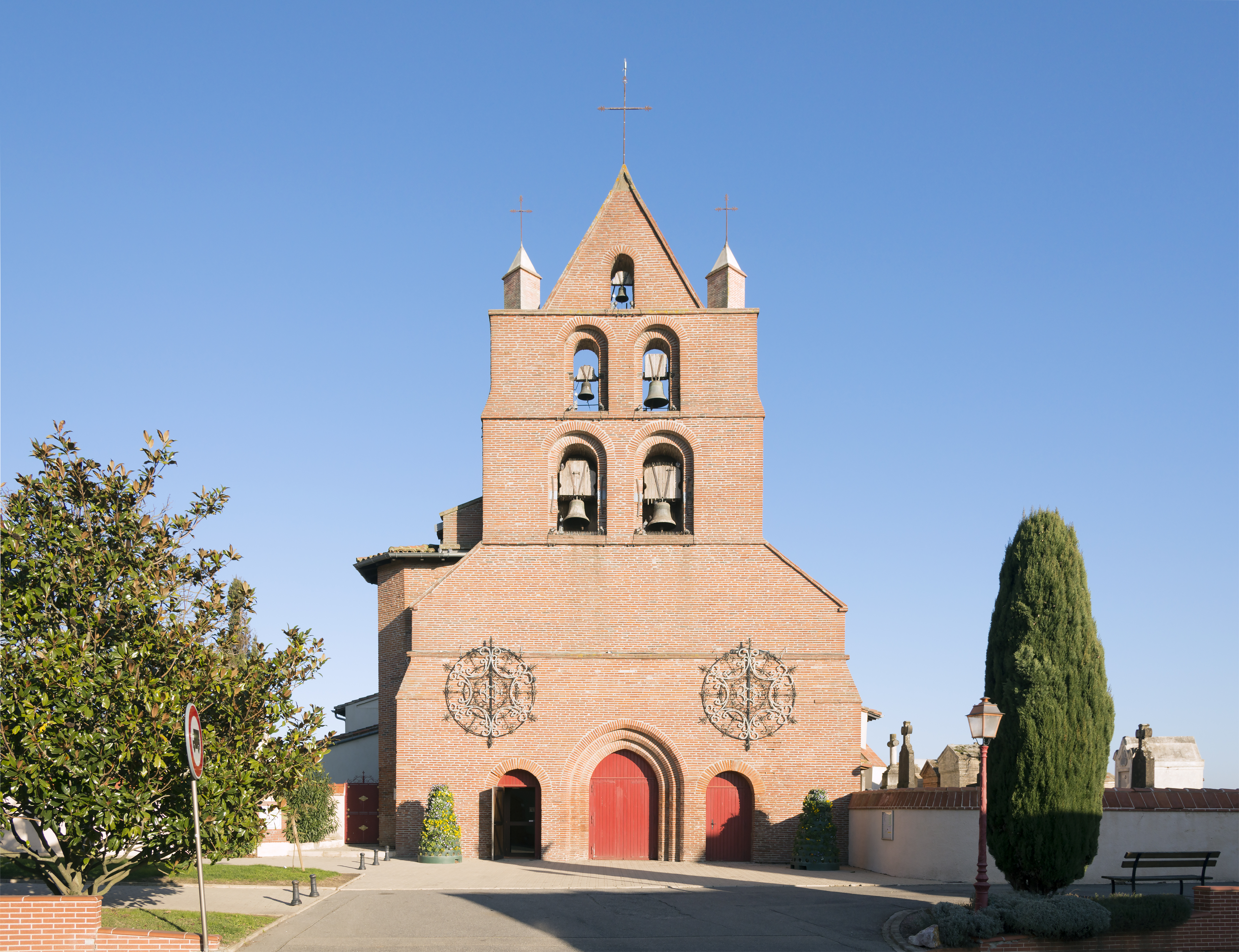
The Church.

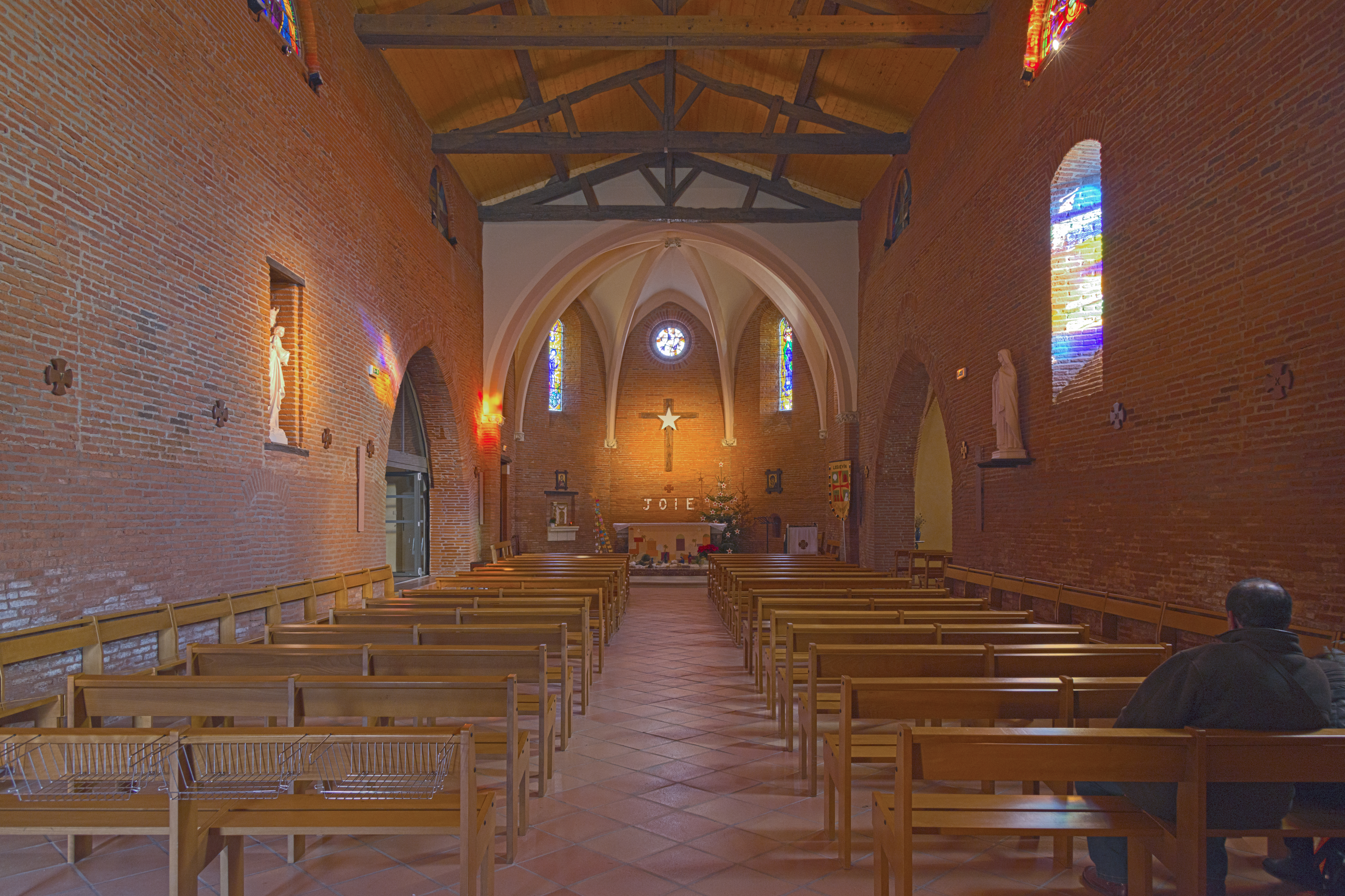
The church nave.

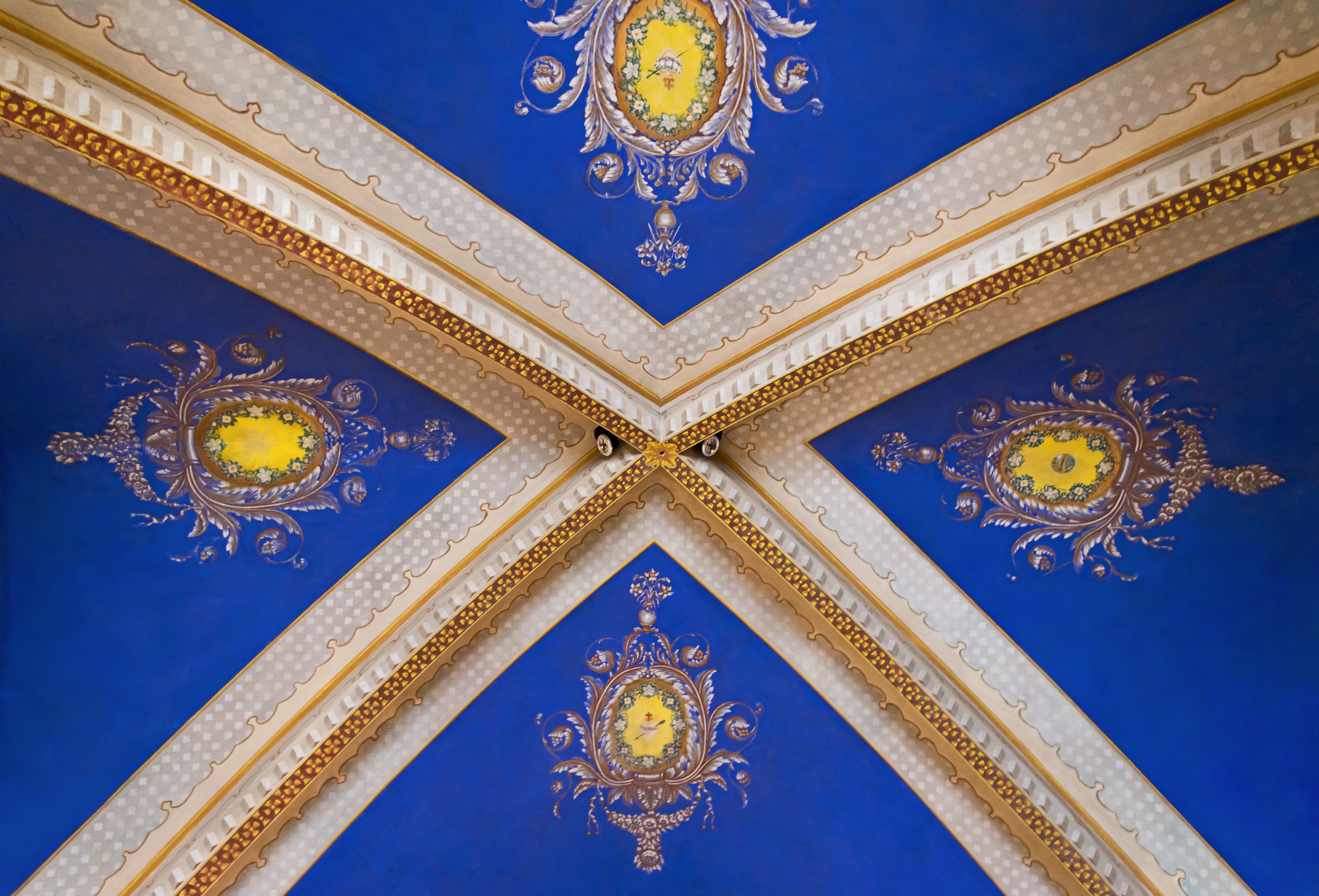
The church ceiling.

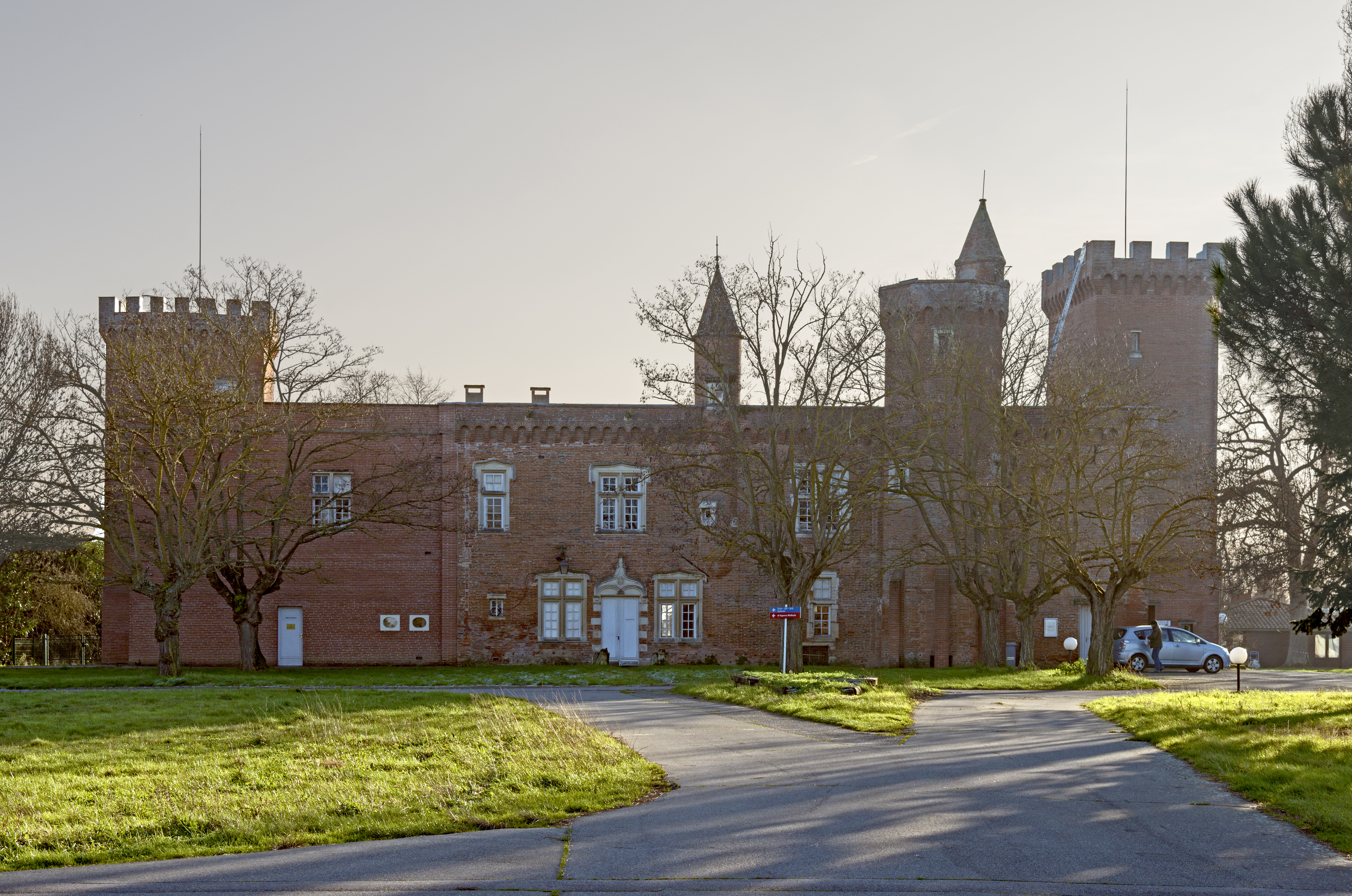
The castle.

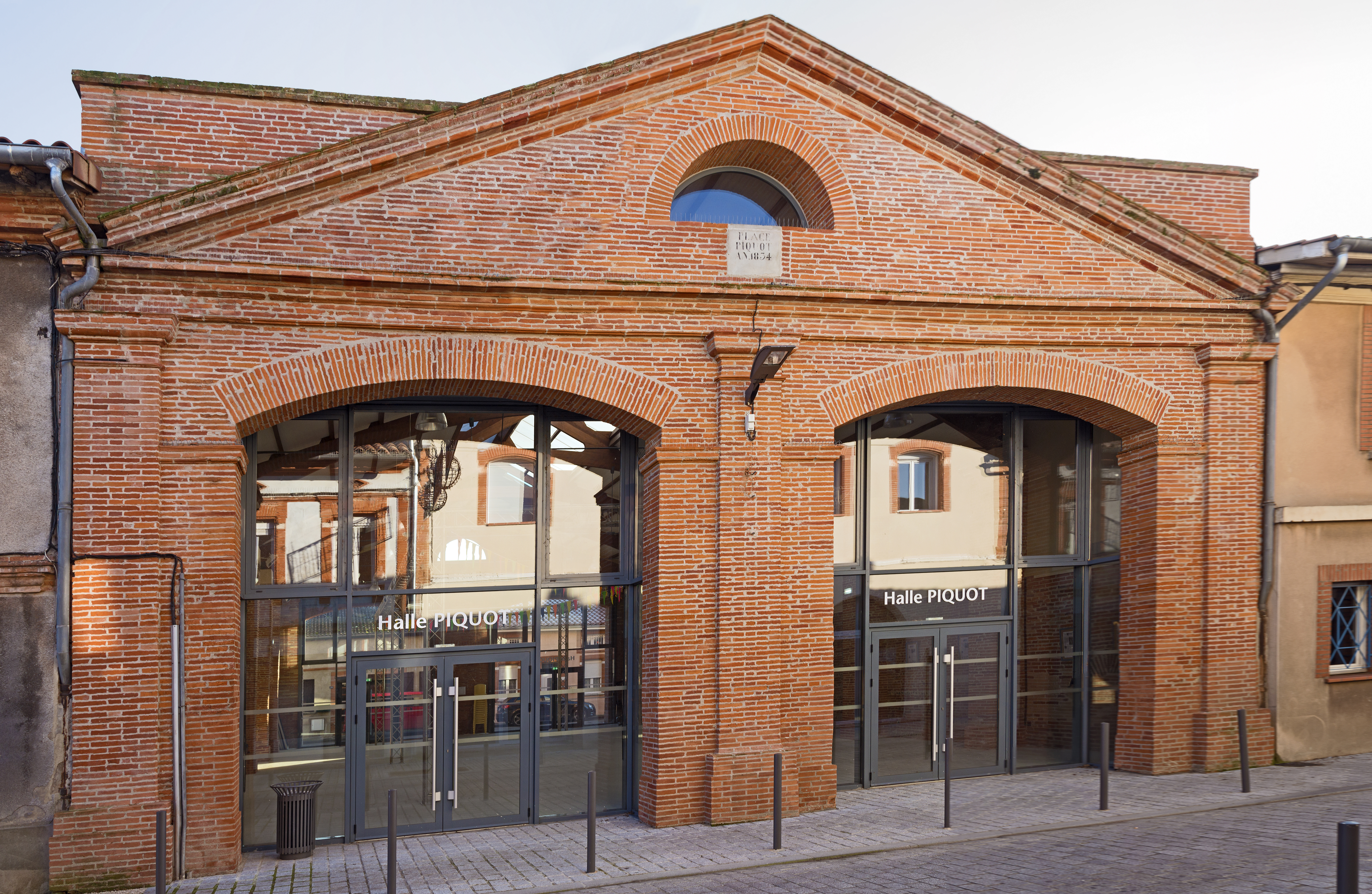
Covered market.

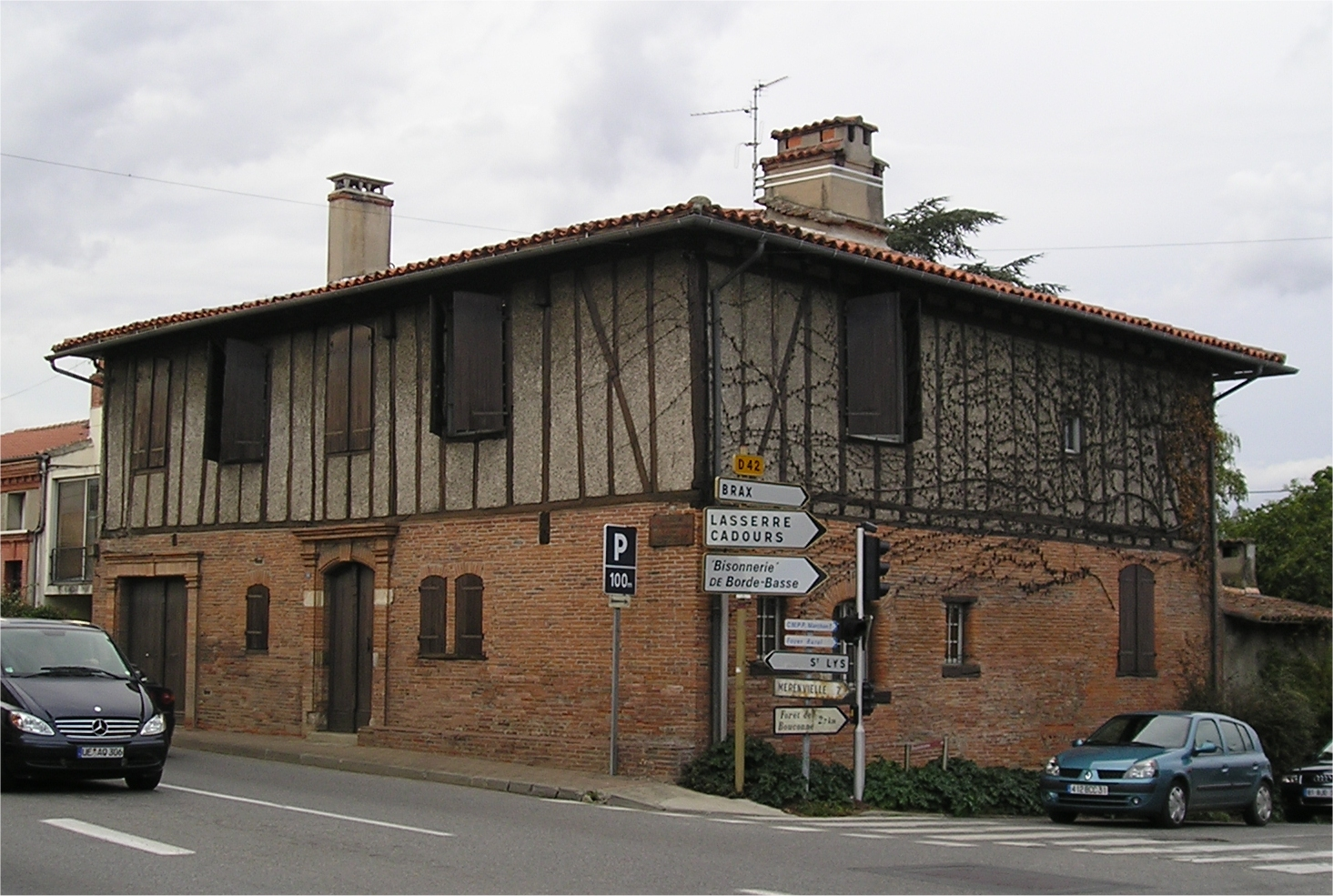
The former post office.

== See also ==
- Communes of the Haute-Garonne department
