= Arrondissement of Toulouse =

Coordinates: 43.60°N 1.43°E

Toulouse
- Arrondissement
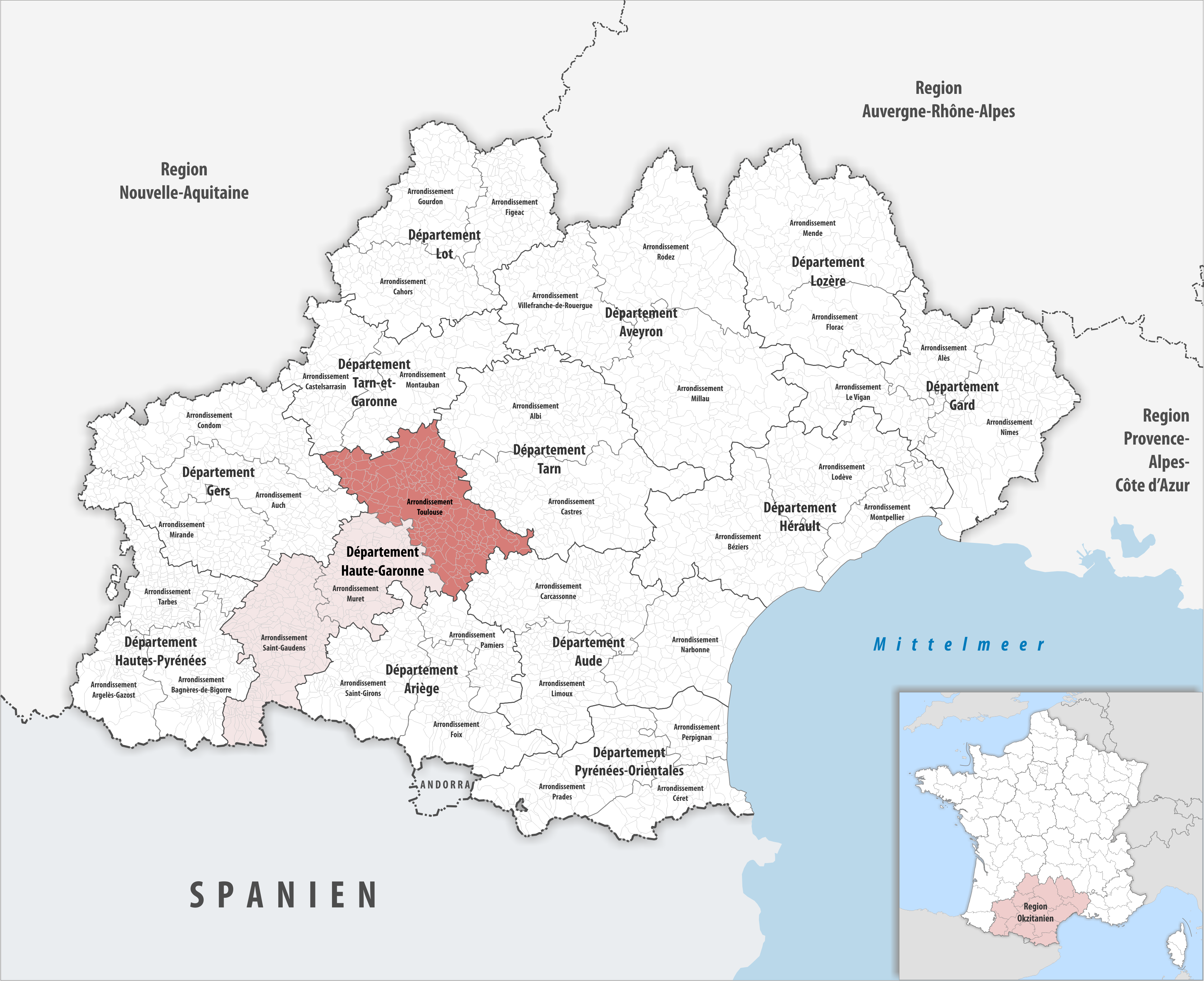
- Location within the region Occitanie
- Country: France
- Region: Occitania
- Department: Haute-Garonne
- No. of communes: {{{nbcomm}}}
- Area: 2,538.9 km^{2} (980.3 sq mi)
- Population (2023): 1,156,370
  - Density: 455.46/km^{2} (1,179.6/sq mi)
- INSEE code: 313

The arrondissement of Toulouse is an arrondissement of France in the Haute-Garonne department in the Occitanie region. It has 225 communes. Its population is 1,125,390 (2021), and its area is 2,538.9 km^{2} (980.3 sq mi).

== Composition ==
The communes of the arrondissement of Toulouse, and their INSEE codes, are:

1. Aignes (31002)
2. Aigrefeuille (31003)
3. Albiac (31006)
4. Aucamville (31022)
5. Aureville (31025)
6. Auriac-sur-Vendinelle (31026)
7. Aurin (31029)
8. Aussonne (31032)
9. Auzeville-Tolosane (31035)
10. Auzielle (31036)
11. Avignonet-Lauragais (31037)
12. Ayguesvives (31004)
13. Azas (31038)
14. Balma (31044)
15. Baziège (31048)
16. Bazus (31049)
17. Beaupuy (31053)
18. Beauteville (31054)
19. Beauville (31055)
20. Beauzelle (31056)
21. Belberaud (31057)
22. Belbèze-de-Lauragais (31058)
23. Bélesta-en-Lauragais (31060)
24. Bellegarde-Sainte-Marie (31061)
25. Bellesserre (31062)
26. Bessières (31066)
27. Blagnac (31069)
28. Bondigoux (31073)
29. Bonrepos-Riquet (31074)
30. Le Born (31077)
31. Bouloc (31079)
32. Bourg-Saint-Bernard (31082)
33. Brax (31088)
34. Bretx (31089)
35. Brignemont (31090)
36. Bruguières (31091)
37. Le Burgaud (31093)
38. Buzet-sur-Tarn (31094)
39. Cabanac-Séguenville (31096)
40. Le Cabanial (31097)
41. Cadours (31098)
42. Caignac (31099)
43. Calmont (31100)
44. Cambiac (31102)
45. Caragoudes (31105)
46. Caraman (31106)
47. Castanet-Tolosan (31113)
48. Castelginest (31116)
49. Castelmaurou (31117)
50. Castelnau-d'Estrétefonds (31118)
51. Le Castéra (31120)
52. Caubiac (31126)
53. Cépet (31136)
54. Cessales (31137)
55. Clermont-le-Fort (31148)
56. Colomiers (31149)
57. Cornebarrieu (31150)
58. Corronsac (31151)
59. Cox (31156)
60. Cugnaux (31157)
61. Daux (31160)
62. Deyme (31161)
63. Donneville (31162)
64. Drémil-Lafage (31163)
65. Drudas (31164)
66. Escalquens (31169)
67. Espanès (31171)
68. Le Faget (31179)
69. Falga (31180)
70. Fenouillet (31182)
71. Flourens (31184)
72. Folcarde (31185)
73. Fonbeauzard (31186)
74. Fourquevaux (31192)
75. Francarville (31194)
76. Fronton (31202)
77. Gagnac-sur-Garonne (31205)
78. Garac (31209)
79. Gardouch (31210)
80. Gargas (31211)
81. Garidech (31212)
82. Gauré (31215)
83. Gémil (31216)
84. Gibel (31220)
85. Goyrans (31227)
86. Gragnague (31228)
87. Gratentour (31230)
88. Grenade (31232)
89. Le Grès (31234)
90. Issus (31240)
91. Juzes (31243)
92. Labastide-Beauvoir (31249)
93. Labastide-Saint-Sernin (31252)
94. Labège (31254)
95. Lacroix-Falgarde (31259)
96. Lagarde (31262)
97. Lagraulet-Saint-Nicolas (31265)
98. Lanta (31271)
99. Lapeyrouse-Fossat (31273)
100. Laréole (31275)
101. Larra (31592)
102. Lasserre-Pradère (31277)
103. Launac (31281)
104. Launaguet (31282)
105. Lauzerville (31284)
106. Lavalette (31285)
107. Layrac-sur-Tarn (31288)
108. Léguevin (31291)
109. Lespinasse (31293)
110. Lévignac (31297)
111. Loubens-Lauragais (31304)
112. Lux (31310)
113. La Magdelaine-sur-Tarn (31311)
114. Mascarville (31325)
115. Mauremont (31328)
116. Maurens (31329)
117. Maureville (31331)
118. Mauvaisin (31332)
119. Menville (31338)
120. Mérenvielle (31339)
121. Mervilla (31340)
122. Merville (31341)
123. Mirepoix-sur-Tarn (31346)
124. Mondonville (31351)
125. Mondouzil (31352)
126. Monestrol (31354)
127. Mons (31355)
128. Montaigut-sur-Save (31356)
129. Montastruc-la-Conseillère (31358)
130. Montberon (31364)
131. Montbrun-Lauragais (31366)
132. Montclar-Lauragais (31368)
133. Montégut-Lauragais (31371)
134. Montesquieu-Lauragais (31374)
135. Montgaillard-Lauragais (31377)
136. Montgeard (31380)
137. Montgiscard (31381)
138. Montjoire (31383)
139. Montlaur (31384)
140. Montpitol (31388)
141. Montrabé (31389)
142. Mourvilles-Basses (31392)
143. Mourvilles-Hautes (31393)
144. Nailloux (31396)
145. Nogaret (31400)
146. Noueilles (31401)
147. Odars (31402)
148. Ondes (31403)
149. Paulhac (31407)
150. Péchabou (31409)
151. Pechbonnieu (31410)
152. Pechbusque (31411)
153. Pelleport (31413)
154. Pibrac (31417)
155. Pin-Balma (31418)
156. Plaisance-du-Touch (31424)
157. Pompertuzat (31429)
158. Pouze (31437)
159. Préserville (31439)
160. Prunet (31441)
161. Puysségur (31444)
162. Quint-Fonsegrives (31445)
163. Ramonville-Saint-Agne (31446)
164. Rebigue (31448)
165. Renneville (31450)
166. Revel (31451)
167. Rieumajou (31453)
168. Roquesérière (31459)
169. Rouffiac-Tolosan (31462)
170. Roumens (31463)
171. Saint-Alban (31467)
172. Saint-Cézert (31473)
173. Sainte-Foy-d'Aigrefeuille (31480)
174. Sainte-Livrade (31496)
175. Saint-Félix-Lauragais (31478)
176. Saint-Geniès-Bellevue (31484)
177. Saint-Germier (31485)
178. Saint-Jean (31488)
179. Saint-Jean-Lherm (31489)
180. Saint-Jory (31490)
181. Saint-Julia (31491)
182. Saint-Léon (31495)
183. Saint-Loup-Cammas (31497)
184. Saint-Marcel-Paulel (31501)
185. Saint-Orens-de-Gameville (31506)
186. Saint-Paul-sur-Save (31507)
187. Saint-Pierre (31511)
188. Saint-Pierre-de-Lages (31512)
189. Saint-Rome (31514)
190. Saint-Rustice (31515)
191. Saint-Sauveur (31516)
192. Saint-Vincent (31519)
193. La Salvetat-Lauragais (31527)
194. La Salvetat-Saint-Gilles (31526)
195. Saussens (31534)
196. Ségreville (31540)
197. Seilh (31541)
198. Seyre (31546)
199. Tarabel (31551)
200. Thil (31553)
201. Toulouse (31555)
202. Tournefeuille (31557)
203. Toutens (31558)
204. Trébons-sur-la-Grasse (31560)
205. L'Union (31561)
206. Vacquiers (31563)
207. Vallègue (31566)
208. Vallesvilles (31567)
209. Varennes (31568)
210. Vaudreuille (31569)
211. Vaux (31570)
212. Vendine (31571)
213. Verfeil (31573)
214. Vieille-Toulouse (31575)
215. Vieillevigne (31576)
216. Vignaux (31577)
217. Vigoulet-Auzil (31578)
218. Villariès (31579)
219. Villaudric (31581)
220. Villefranche-de-Lauragais (31582)
221. Villematier (31583)
222. Villemur-sur-Tarn (31584)
223. Villeneuve-lès-Bouloc (31587)
224. Villeneuve-Tolosane (31588)
225. Villenouvelle (31589)

== History ==
The arrondissement of Toulouse was created in 1800. In January 2017 it lost the commune Auragne to the arrondissement of Muret, and it gained the commune Aignes from the arrondissement of Muret.

As a result of the reorganisation of the cantons of France which came into effect in 2015, the borders of the cantons are no longer related to the borders of the arrondissements. The cantons of the arrondissement of Toulouse were, as of January 2015:

1. Blagnac
2. Cadours
3. Caraman
4. Castanet-Tolosan
5. Fronton
6. Grenade
7. Lanta
8. Léguevin
9. Montastruc-la-Conseillère
10. Montgiscard
11. Nailloux
12. Revel
13. Toulouse-1
14. Toulouse-2
15. Toulouse-3
16. Toulouse-4
17. Toulouse-5
18. Toulouse-6
19. Toulouse-7
20. Toulouse-8
21. Toulouse-9
22. Toulouse-10
23. Toulouse-11
24. Toulouse-12
25. Toulouse-13
26. Toulouse-14
27. Toulouse-15
28. Tournefeuille
29. Verfeil
30. Villefranche-de-Lauragais
31. Villemur-sur-Tarn
