= Cantons of the Haute-Garonne department =

The following is a list of the 27 cantons of the Haute-Garonne department, in France, following the French canton reorganisation which came into effect in March 2015:

- Auterive
- Bagnères-de-Luchon
- Blagnac
- Castanet-Tolosan
- Castelginest
- Cazères
- Escalquens
- Léguevin
- Muret
- Pechbonnieu
- Plaisance-du-Touch
- Portet-sur-Garonne
- Revel
- Saint-Gaudens
- Toulouse-1
- Toulouse-2
- Toulouse-3
- Toulouse-4
- Toulouse-5
- Toulouse-6
- Toulouse-7
- Toulouse-8
- Toulouse-9
- Toulouse-10
- Toulouse-11
- Tournefeuille
- Villemur-sur-Tarn
