= Albiac, Haute-Garonne =

Albiac
- Commune
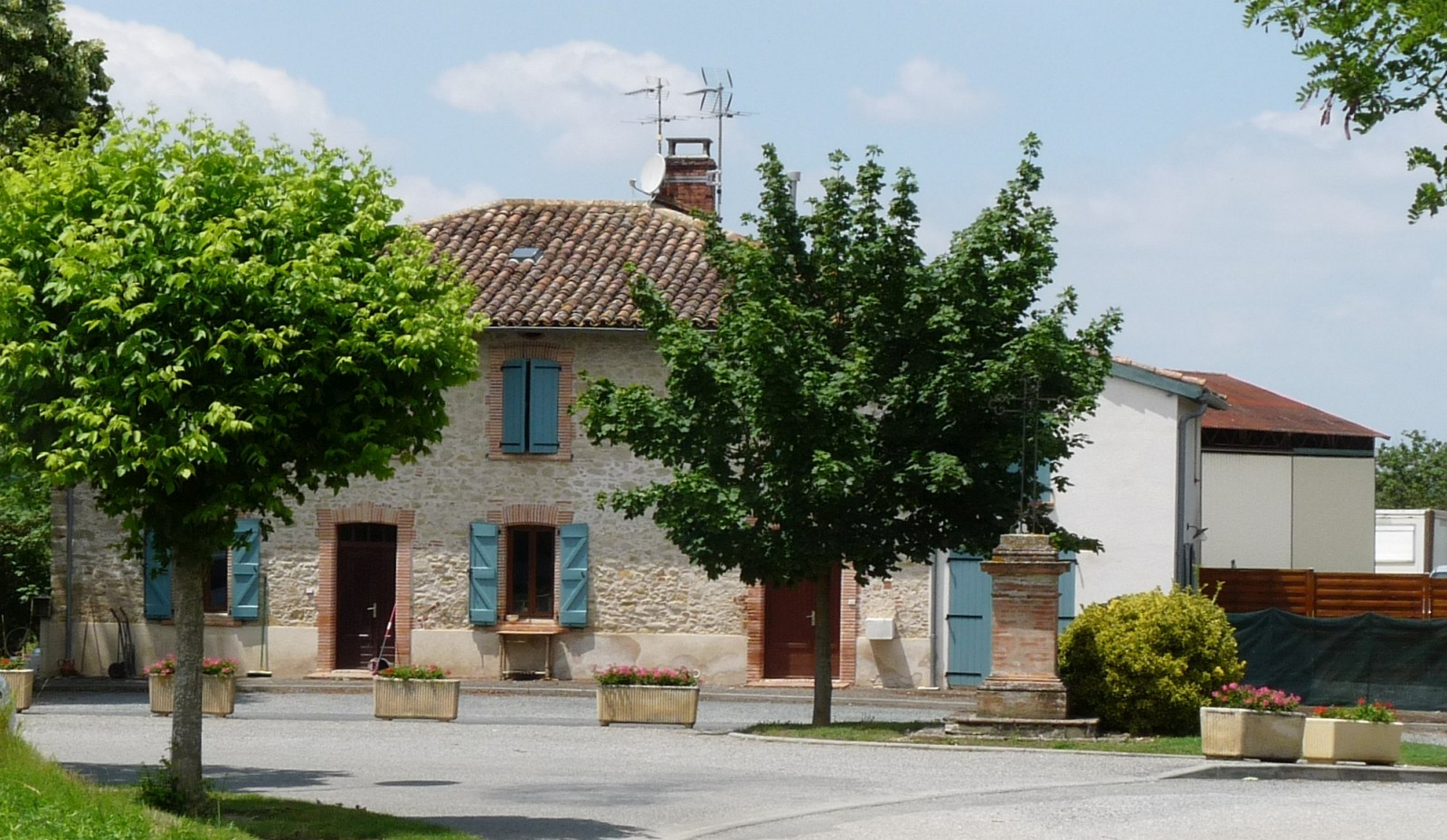
- The central square in Albiac

- Coat of arms
- Location of Albiac
- Location within France Location within Occitanie
- Coordinates: 43°33′11″N 1°46′53″E
- Country: France
- Region: Occitania
- Department: Haute-Garonne
- Arrondissement: Toulouse
- Canton: Revel
- Intercommunality: Terres du Lauragais

Government
  - Mayor (2020–2026): Cédric Rougé
- Area^{1}: 4.71 km^{2} (1.82 sq mi)
- Elevation: 230 m (750 ft)
- Highest elevation: 263 m (863 ft)
- Lowest elevation: 175 m (574 ft)
- Population (2023): 231
  - Density: 49.0/km^{2} (127/sq mi)
- Time zone: UTC+01:00 (CET)
  - Summer (DST): UTC+02:00 (CEST)
- INSEE/Postal code: 31006 /31460
- ^{1} French Land Register data, which excludes lakes, ponds, glaciers > 1 km^{2} (0.386 sq mi or 247 acres) and river estuaries.

Albiac (French pronunciation: [albjak]) is a commune in the Haute-Garonne department in southwestern France.

== Geography ==
The commune is bordered by five other communes: Loubens-Lauragais to the north, Le Faget to the east, La Salvetat-Lauragais to the southeast, Caraman to the south, and finally by Mascarville to the west.

== Population ==
Historical population
Year	Pop.	±% p.a.
1968	116	—
1975	117	+0.12%
1982	120	+0.36%
1990	137	+1.67%
1999	159	+1.67%
2007	191	+2.32%
2012	198	+0.72%
2017	210	+1.18%
2023	231	+1.60%
Source: INSEE

The inhabitants of the commune are known as Albiacois and Albiacoises in French.

== See also ==
- Communes of the Haute-Garonne department
