= Larra =

Larra may refer to:

- Larra (wasp), a genus of parasitoid wasps
- Larra, Haute-Garonne, a commune in France
- Larra (Victoria), a large homestead near the town of Derrinallum, Victoria, Australia
- Mariano José de Larra (1809–1837), Spanish romantic writer and journalist
- Luis Mariano de Larra (1830–1901), Spanish writer, son of Mariano José de Larra
- Gaizka Larrazabal (born 1997), Spanish footballer
