= Bourg-Saint-Bernard =

- Commune
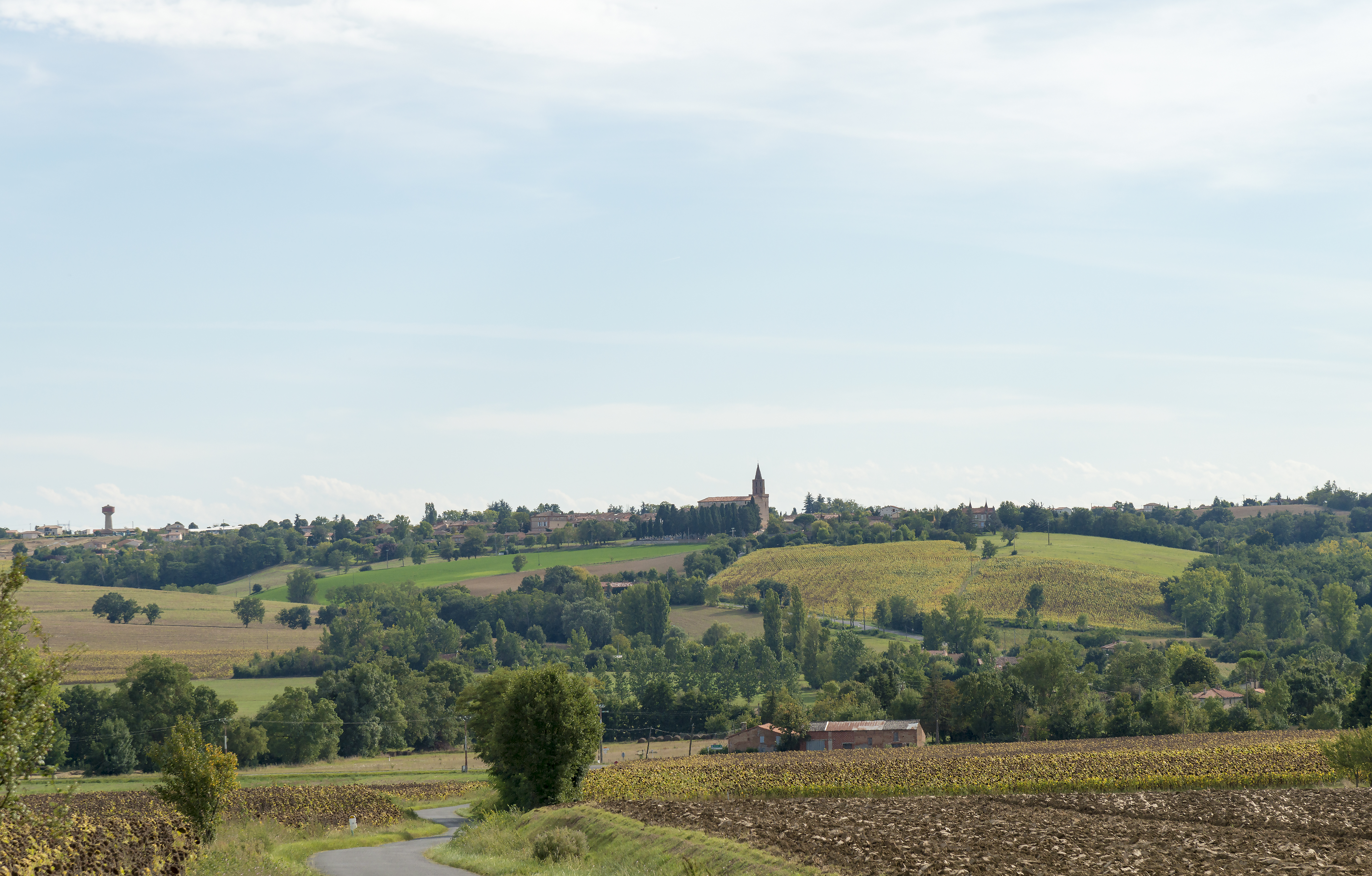
- A general view of Bourg-Saint-Bernard

- Coat of arms
- Location of Bourg-Saint-Bernard
- Location within France Location within Occitanie
- Coordinates: 43°36′11″N 1°42′48″E
- Country: France
- Region: Occitania
- Department: Haute-Garonne
- Arrondissement: Toulouse
- Canton: Revel

Government
  - Mayor (2020–2026): Évelyne Cesses
- Area^{1}: 16.6 km^{2} (6.4 sq mi)
- Elevation: 250 m (820 ft)
- Highest elevation: 253 m (830 ft)
- Lowest elevation: 156 m (512 ft)
- Population (2023): 1,125
  - Density: 67.8/km^{2} (176/sq mi)
- Time zone: UTC+01:00 (CET)
  - Summer (DST): UTC+02:00 (CEST)
- INSEE/Postal code: 31082 /31570
- ^{1} French Land Register data, which excludes lakes, ponds, glaciers > 1 km^{2} (0.386 sq mi or 247 acres) and river estuaries.

Bourg-Saint-Bernard (French pronunciation: [buʁ sɛ̃ bɛʁnaʁ]; Languedocien: Le Borg de Sant Bernat) is a commune of the Haute-Garonne department in southwestern France.

== Population ==
Historical population
Year	Pop.	±% p.a.
1968	605	—
1975	585	−0.48%
1982	584	−0.02%
1990	659	+1.52%
1999	772	+1.77%
2007	821	+0.77%
2012	963	+3.24%
2017	1,038	+1.51%
2023	1,125	+1.35%
Source: INSEE

The inhabitants of the commune are known as Bourguignons in French.

== Monument ==
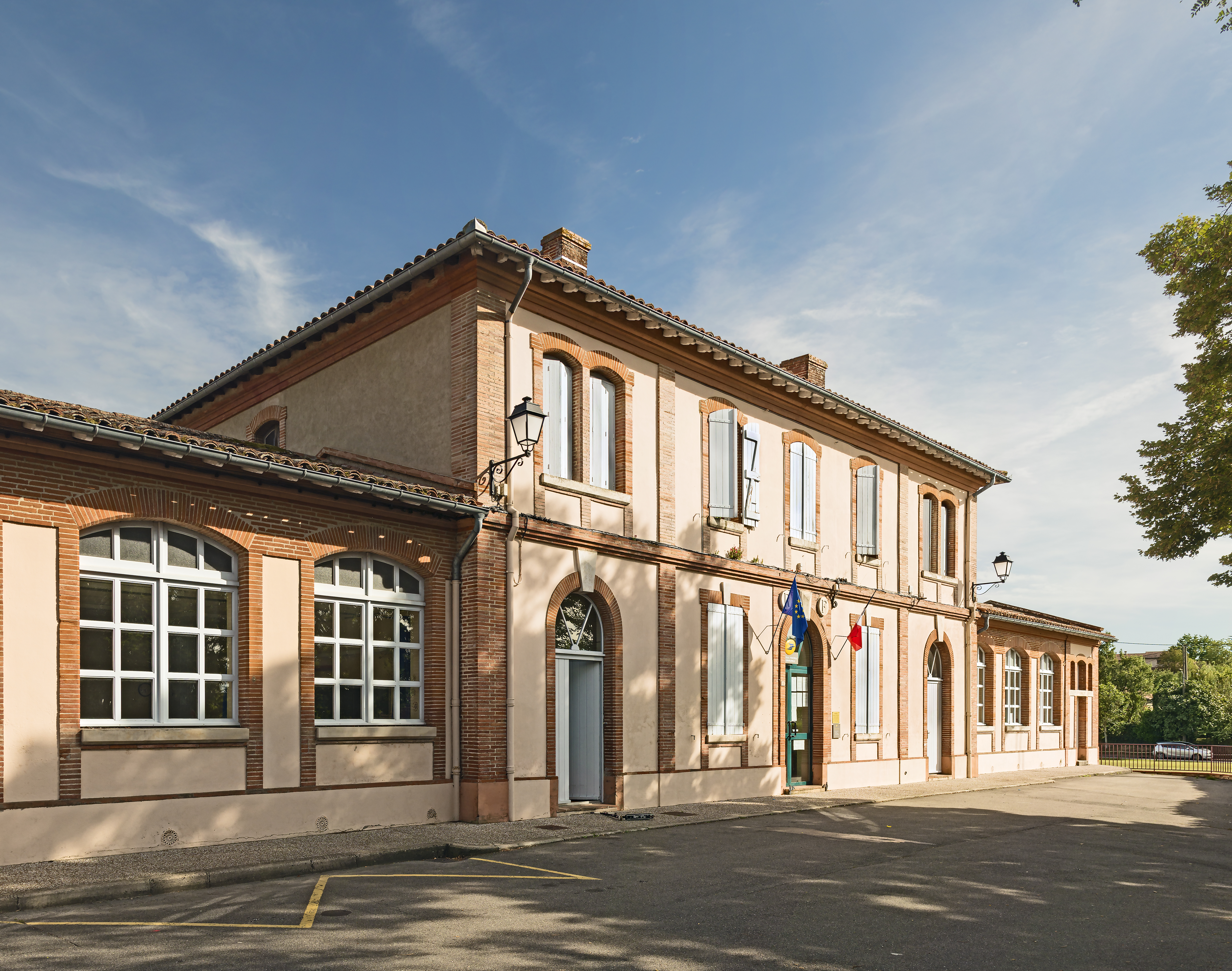
Town hall

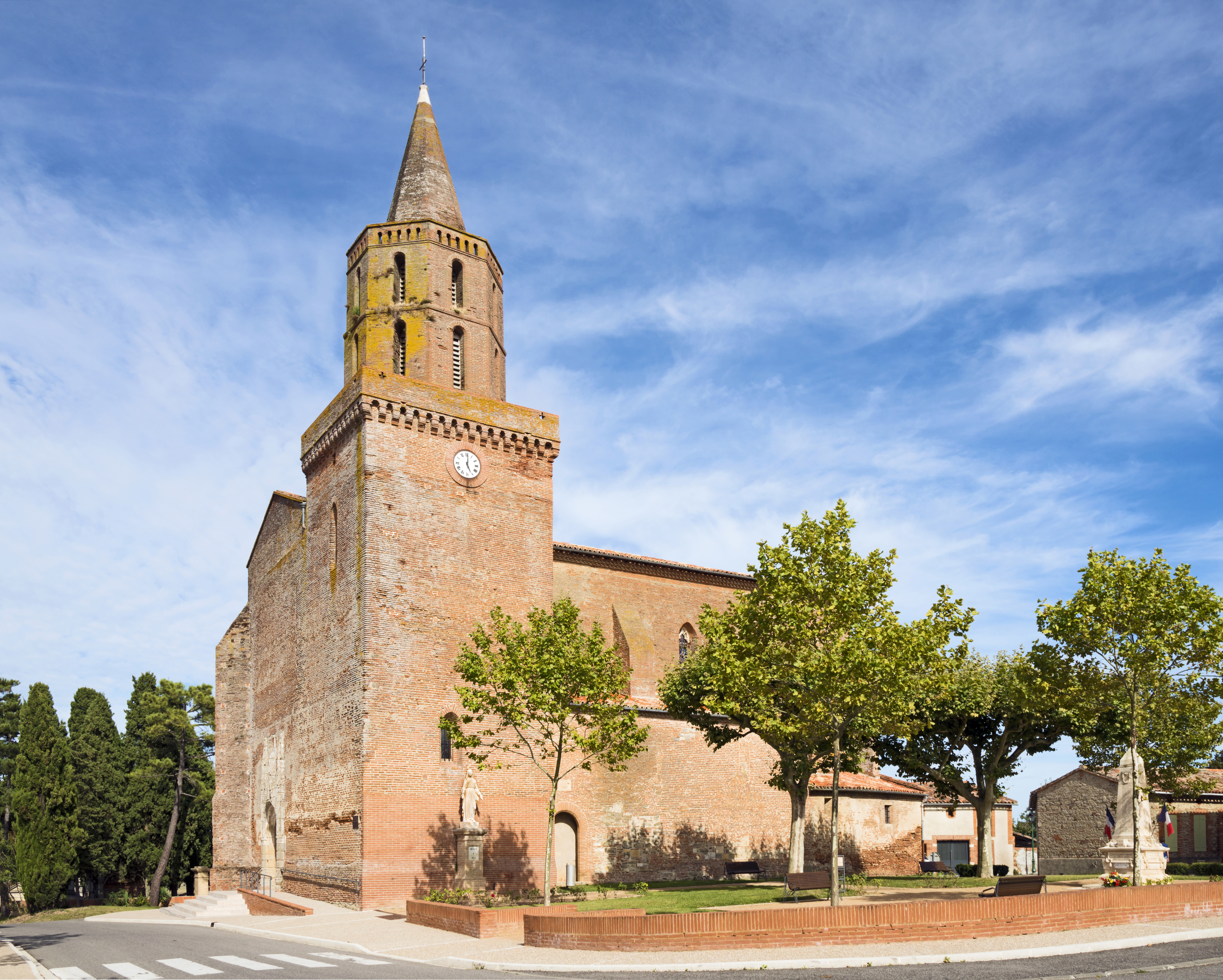
Church "Saint-Bernard"

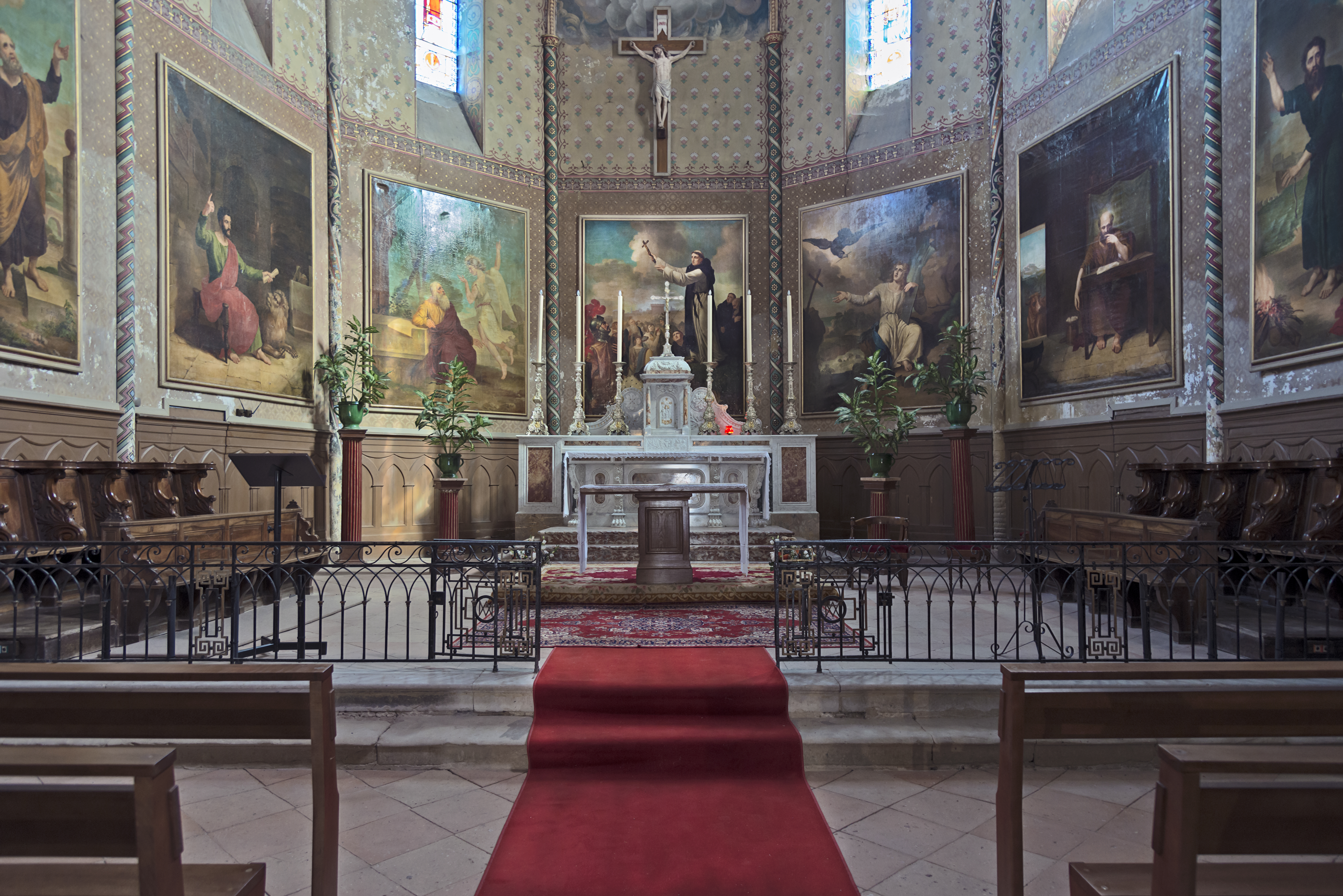
Altar

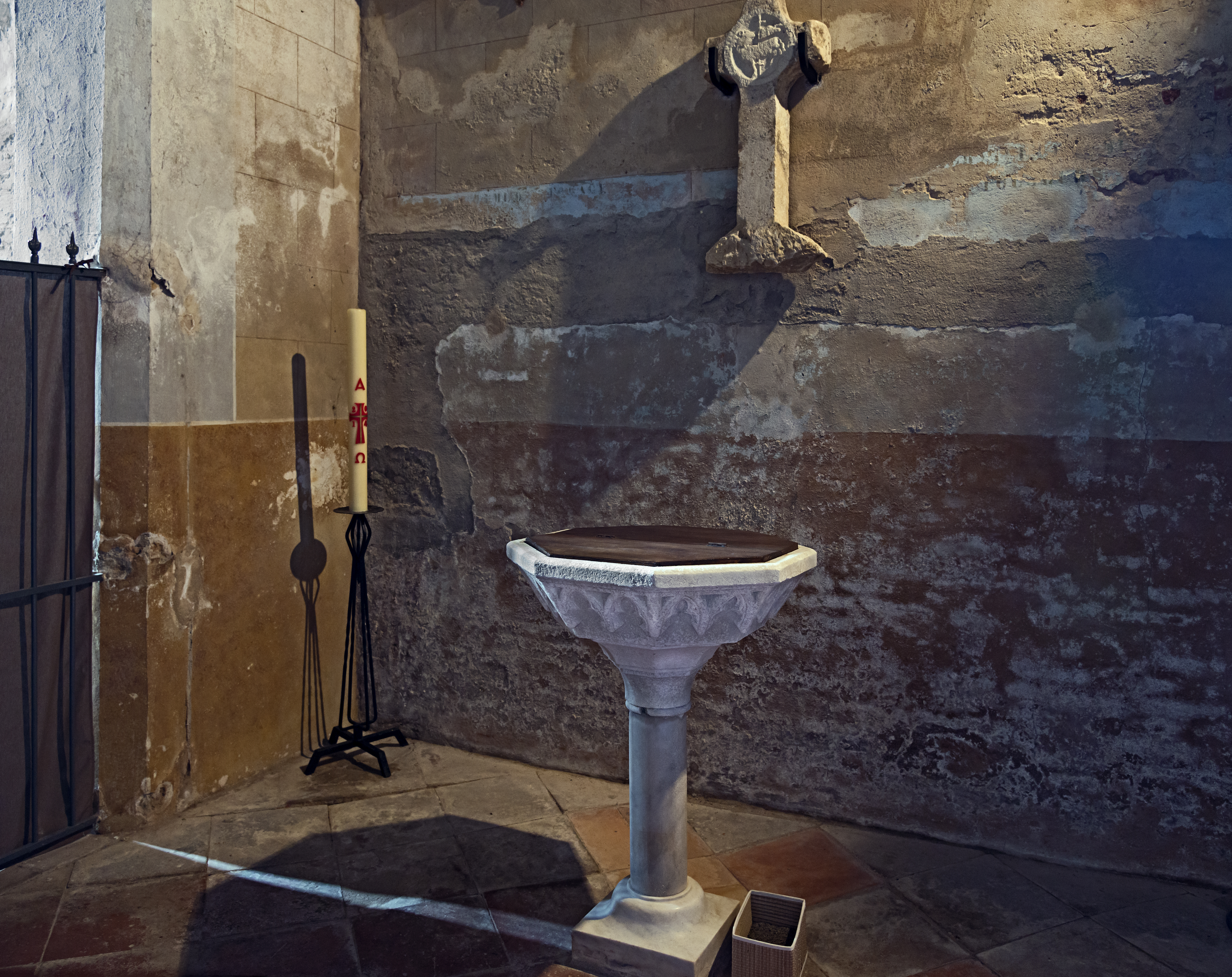
Font

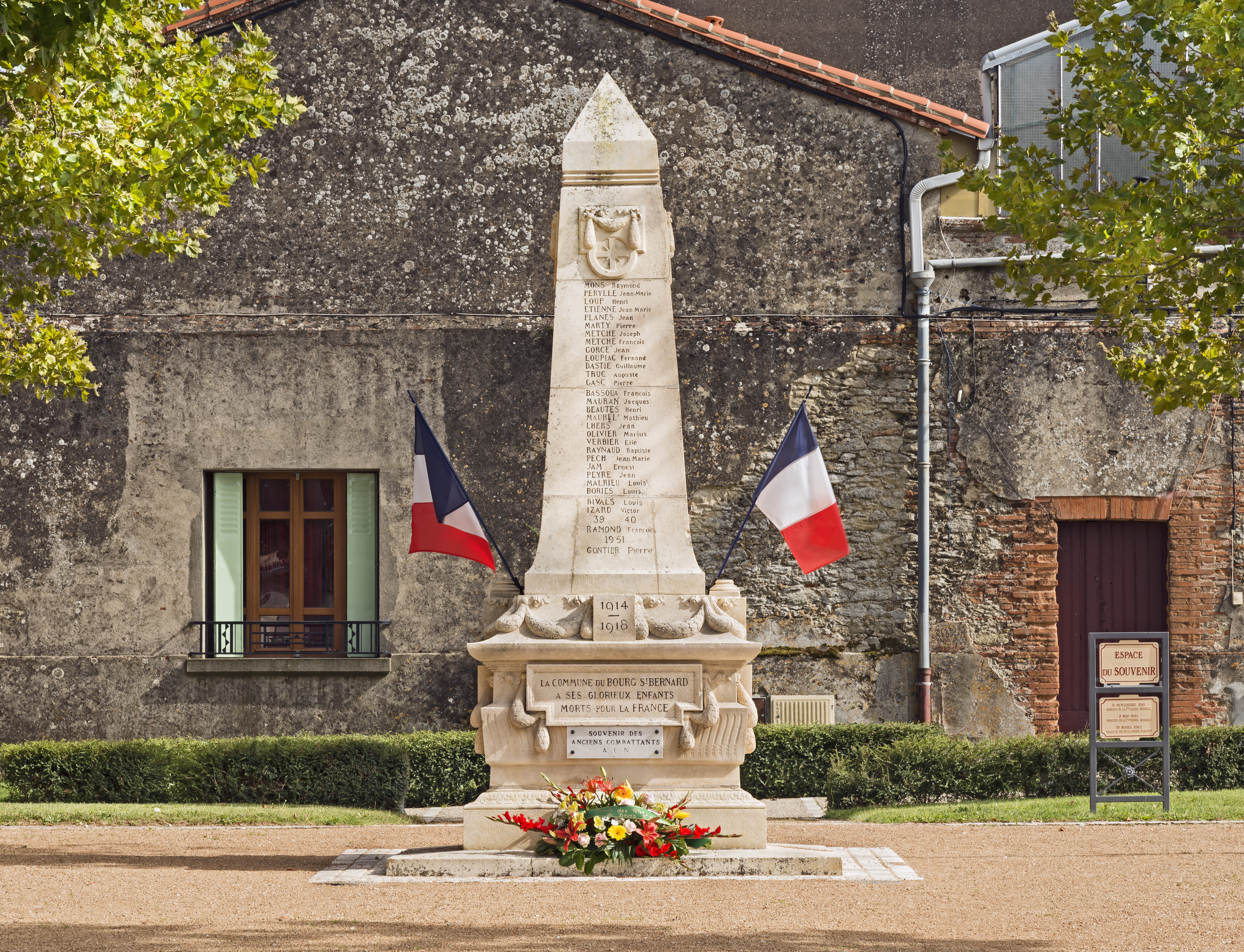
War memorial

== See also ==
- Communes of the Haute-Garonne department
