= Le Cabanial =

- Commune
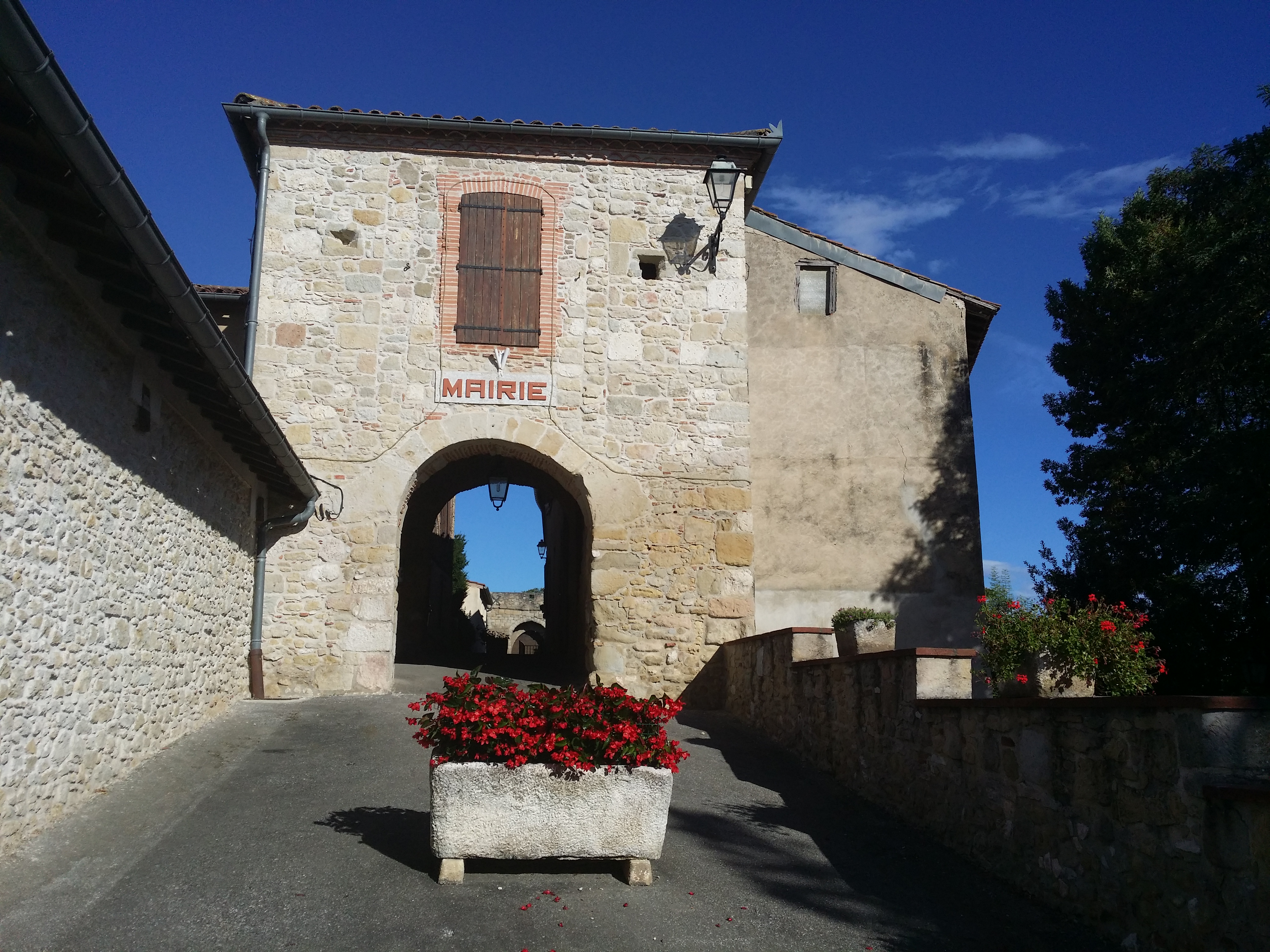
- The town hall in Le Cabanial

- Coat of arms
- Location of Le Cabanial
- Location within France Location within Occitanie
- Coordinates: 43°30′59″N 1°52′32″E
- Country: France
- Region: Occitania
- Department: Haute-Garonne
- Arrondissement: Toulouse
- Canton: Revel

Government
  - Mayor (2020–2026): Thierry Rouvillain
- Area^{1}: 8.47 km^{2} (3.27 sq mi)
- Highest elevation: 280 m (920 ft)
- Lowest elevation: 192 m (630 ft)
- Population (2023): 472
  - Density: 55.7/km^{2} (144/sq mi)
- Time zone: UTC+01:00 (CET)
  - Summer (DST): UTC+02:00 (CEST)
- INSEE/Postal code: 31097 /31460
- ^{1} French Land Register data, which excludes lakes, ponds, glaciers > 1 km^{2} (0.386 sq mi or 247 acres) and river estuaries.

Le Cabanial (French pronunciation: [lə kabanjal]) is a commune of the Haute-Garonne department in southwestern France.

== Population ==
Historical population
Year	Pop.	±% p.a.
1968	199	—
1975	163	−2.81%
1982	170	+0.60%
1990	188	+1.27%
1999	246	+3.03%
2007	333	+3.86%
2012	404	+3.94%
2017	454	+2.36%
2023	472	+0.65%
Source: INSEE

The inhabitants of the commune are known as Cabanialais in French.

== See also ==
- Communes of the Haute-Garonne department
