= Auriac-sur-Vendinelle =

- Commune
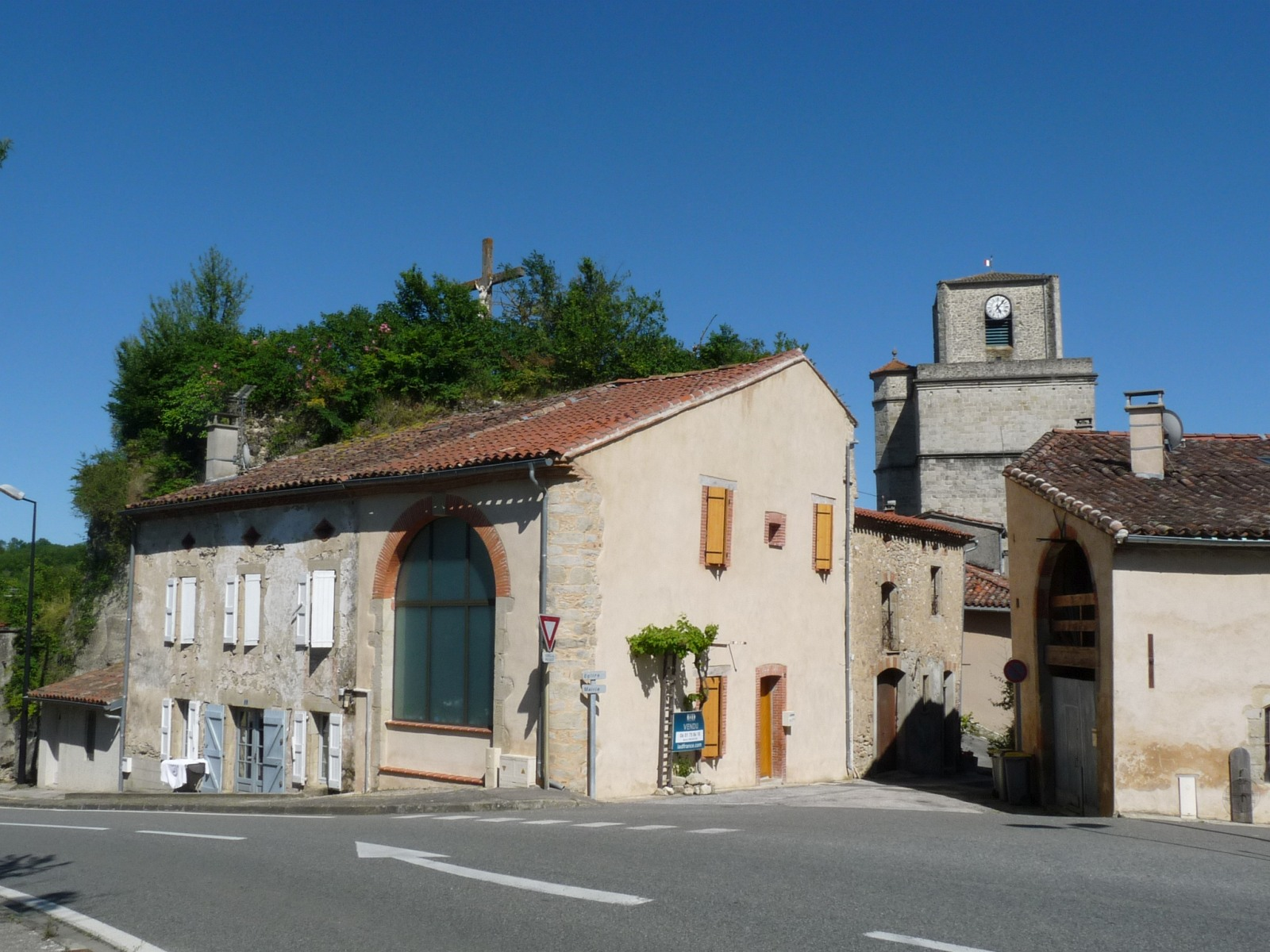
- The church and old chateau in Auriac-sur-Vendinelle

- Coat of arms
- Location of Auriac-sur-Vendinelle
- Location within France Location within Occitanie
- Coordinates: 43°31′30″N 1°49′37″E
- Country: France
- Region: Occitania
- Department: Haute-Garonne
- Arrondissement: Toulouse
- Canton: Revel
- Intercommunality: CC Terres Lauragais

Government
  - Mayor (2020–2026): Roger Pedrero
- Area^{1}: 30.71 km^{2} (11.86 sq mi)
- Elevation: 175 m (574 ft)
- Highest elevation: 270 m (890 ft)
- Lowest elevation: 183 m (600 ft)
- Population (2023): 1,087
  - Density: 35.40/km^{2} (91.67/sq mi)
- Time zone: UTC+01:00 (CET)
  - Summer (DST): UTC+02:00 (CEST)
- INSEE/Postal code: 31026 /31460
- ^{1} French Land Register data, which excludes lakes, ponds, glaciers > 1 km^{2} (0.386 sq mi or 247 acres) and river estuaries.

Auriac-sur-Vendinelle (Occitan: Vendinella) is a commune in the Haute-Garonne department in southwestern France.

== Population ==
Historical population
Year	Pop.	±% p.a.
1968	939	—
1975	849	−1.43%
1982	910	+1.00%
1990	976	+0.88%
1999	958	−0.21%
2007	1,006	+0.61%
2012	972	−0.69%
2017	1,035	+1.26%
2023	1,087	+0.82%
Source: INSEE

== See also ==
- Communes of the Haute-Garonne department
