= Saint-Germier, Haute-Garonne =

Saint-Germier
- Commune
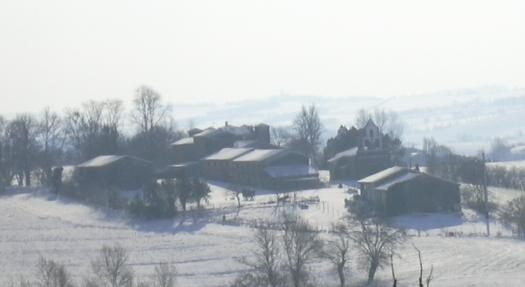
- A general view of Saint-Germier in the snow
- Location of Saint-Germier
- Location within France Location within Occitanie
- Coordinates: 43°28′19″N 1°43′59″E
- Country: France
- Region: Occitania
- Department: Haute-Garonne
- Arrondissement: Toulouse
- Canton: Revel

Government
  - Mayor (2020–2026): Esther Escrich-Fons
- Area^{1}: 3.74 km^{2} (1.44 sq mi)
- Elevation: 261 m (856 ft)
- Highest elevation: 271 m (889 ft)
- Lowest elevation: 188 m (617 ft)
- Population (2023): 133
  - Density: 35.6/km^{2} (92.1/sq mi)
- Time zone: UTC+01:00 (CET)
  - Summer (DST): UTC+02:00 (CEST)
- INSEE/Postal code: 31485 /31290
- ^{1} French Land Register data, which excludes lakes, ponds, glaciers > 1 km^{2} (0.386 sq mi or 247 acres) and river estuaries.

Saint-Germier (French pronunciation: [sɛ̃ ʒɛʁmje]; Languedocien: Sant Germièr or Sent Germièr) is a commune in the Haute-Garonne department in southwestern France.

== Population ==
Historical population
Year	Pop.	±% p.a.
1968	69	—
1975	69	+0.00%
1982	75	+1.20%
1990	72	−0.51%
1999	86	+1.99%
2007	94	+1.12%
2012	102	+1.65%
2017	111	+1.71%
2023	133	+3.06%
Source: INSEE

== See also ==
- Communes of the Haute-Garonne department
