= Gardouch =

- Commune
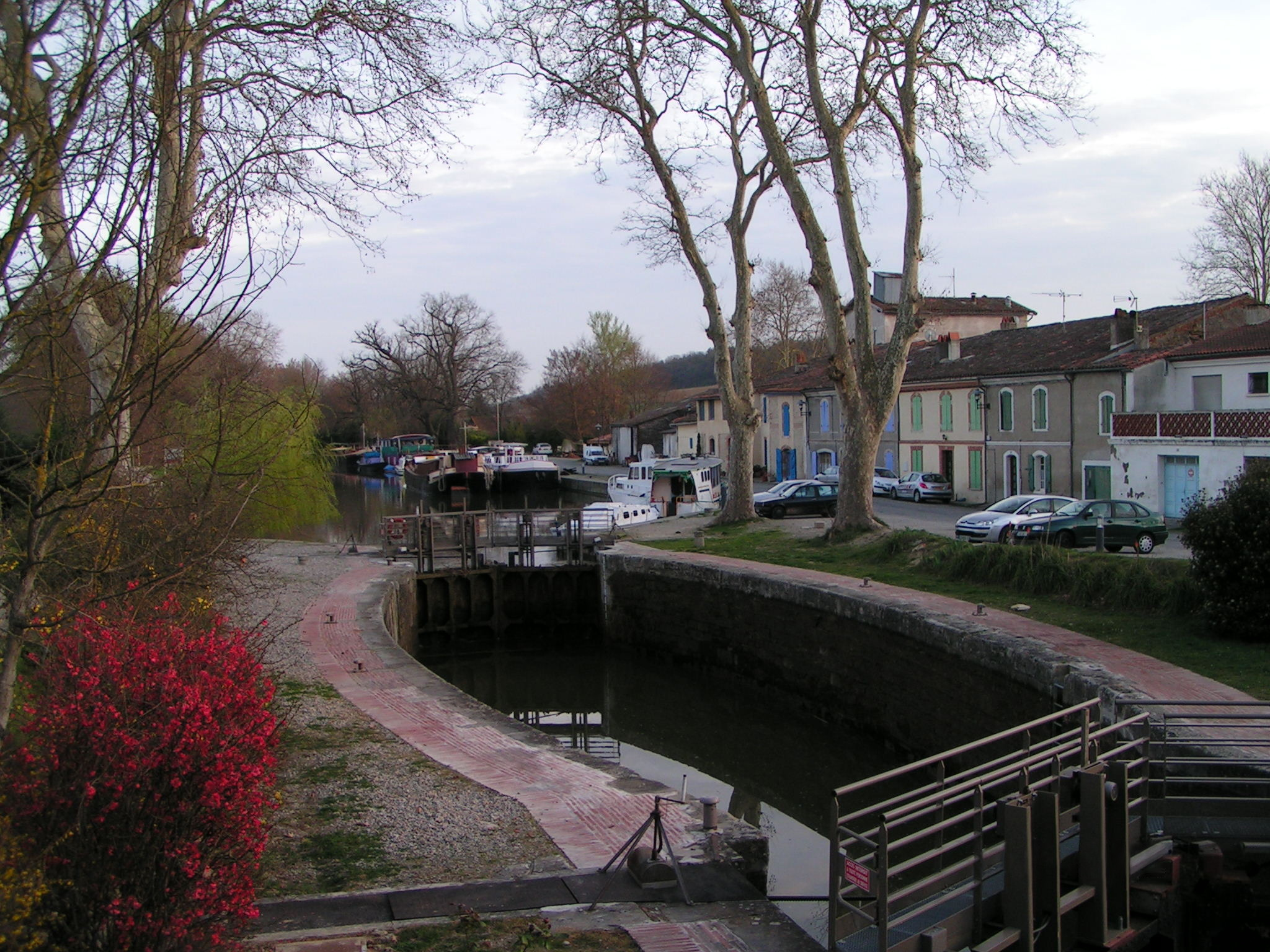
- Gardouch lock on the Canal du Midi

- Coat of arms
- Location of Gardouch
- Location within France Location within Occitanie
- Coordinates: 43°23′31″N 1°41′04″E
- Country: France
- Region: Occitania
- Department: Haute-Garonne
- Arrondissement: Toulouse
- Canton: Revel

Government
  - Mayor (2020–2026): Olivier Guerra
- Area^{1}: 16.31 km^{2} (6.30 sq mi)
- Elevation: 176 m (577 ft)
- Highest elevation: 259 m (850 ft)
- Lowest elevation: 168 m (551 ft)
- Population (2023): 1,370
  - Density: 84.0/km^{2} (218/sq mi)
- Time zone: UTC+01:00 (CET)
  - Summer (DST): UTC+02:00 (CEST)
- INSEE/Postal code: 31210 /31290
- ^{1} French Land Register data, which excludes lakes, ponds, glaciers > 1 km^{2} (0.386 sq mi or 247 acres) and river estuaries.

Gardouch (French pronunciation: [ɡaʁduʃ]; Occitan: Gardog) is a commune in the Haute-Garonne department in southwestern France.

== Population ==
Historical population
Year	Pop.	±% p.a.
1968	711	—
1975	689	−0.45%
1982	727	+0.77%
1990	889	+2.55%
1999	996	+1.27%
2007	1,247	+2.85%
2012	1,290	+0.68%
2017	1,268	−0.34%
2023	1,370	+1.30%
Source: INSEE

== See also ==
- Communes of the Haute-Garonne department
