= Buzet-sur-Tarn =

- Commune
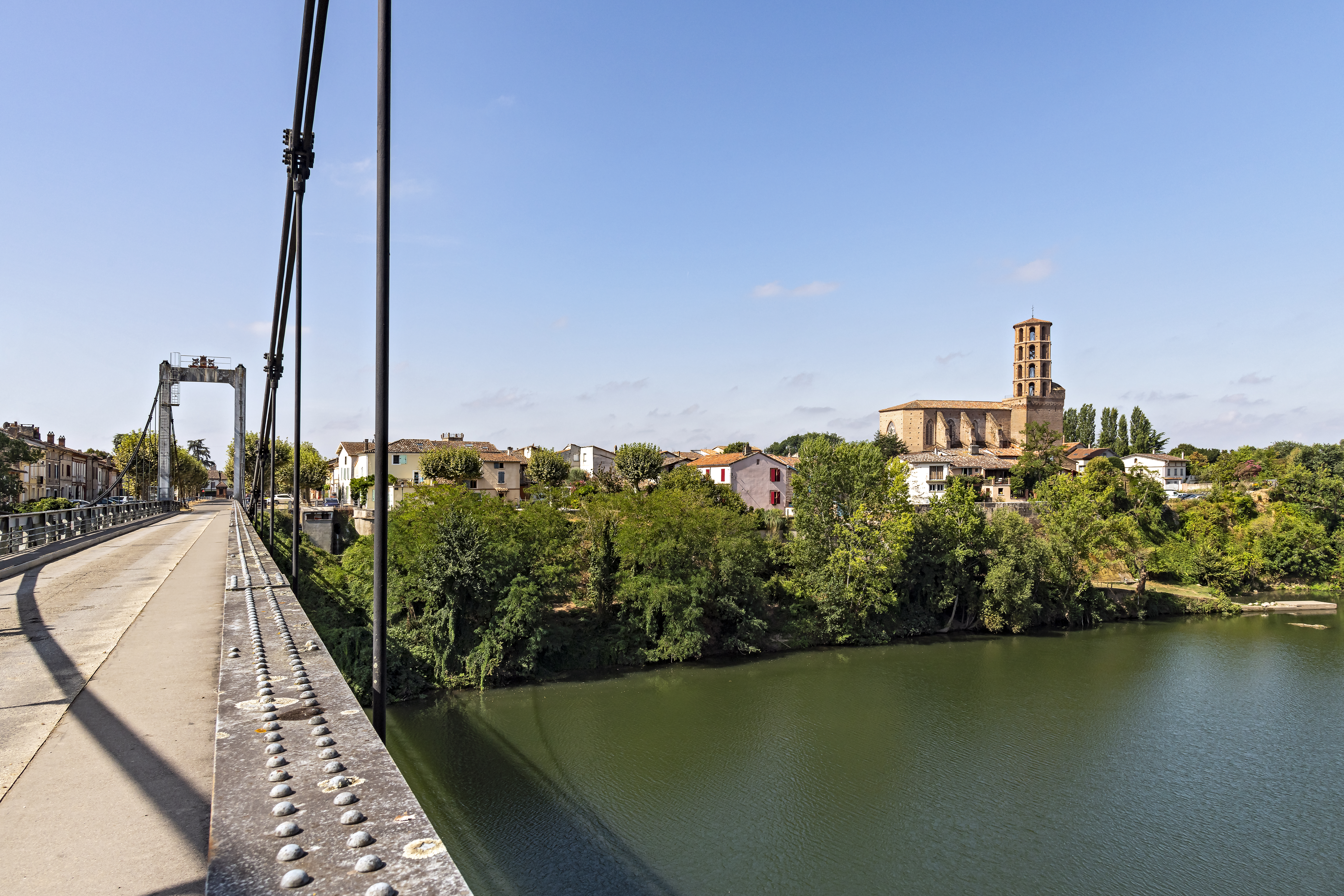
- Buzet-sur-Tarn

- Coat of arms
- Location of Buzet-sur-Tarn
- Location within France Location within Occitanie
- Coordinates: 43°46′47″N 1°38′02″E
- Country: France
- Region: Occitania
- Department: Haute-Garonne
- Arrondissement: Toulouse
- Canton: Villemur-sur-Tarn
- Intercommunality: Val'Aïgo

Government
  - Mayor (2020–2026): Gilles Joviado
- Area^{1}: 30.19 km^{2} (11.66 sq mi)
- Elevation: 110 m (360 ft)
- Highest elevation: 247 m (810 ft)
- Lowest elevation: 95 m (312 ft)
- Population (2023): 2,963
  - Density: 98.15/km^{2} (254.2/sq mi)
- Time zone: UTC+01:00 (CET)
  - Summer (DST): UTC+02:00 (CEST)
- INSEE/Postal code: 31094 /31660
- ^{1} French Land Register data, which excludes lakes, ponds, glaciers > 1 km^{2} (0.386 sq mi or 247 acres) and river estuaries.

Buzet-sur-Tarn (French pronunciation: [byzɛ syʁ taʁn], literally Buzet on Tarn; Occitan: Buset) is a commune in the Haute-Garonne department in southwestern France. Roqueserière-Buzet station has rail connections to Toulouse, Albi and Rodez.

== Population ==
Historical population
Year	Pop.	±% p.a.
1968	945	—
1975	1,060	+1.65%
1982	1,278	+2.71%
1990	1,281	+0.03%
1999	1,410	+1.07%
2007	2,037	+4.71%
2012	2,469	+3.92%
2017	2,767	+2.31%
2023	2,963	+1.15%
Source: INSEE

== See also ==
- Communes of the Haute-Garonne department
