= Toutens =

Toutens Totens (Occitan)
- Commune
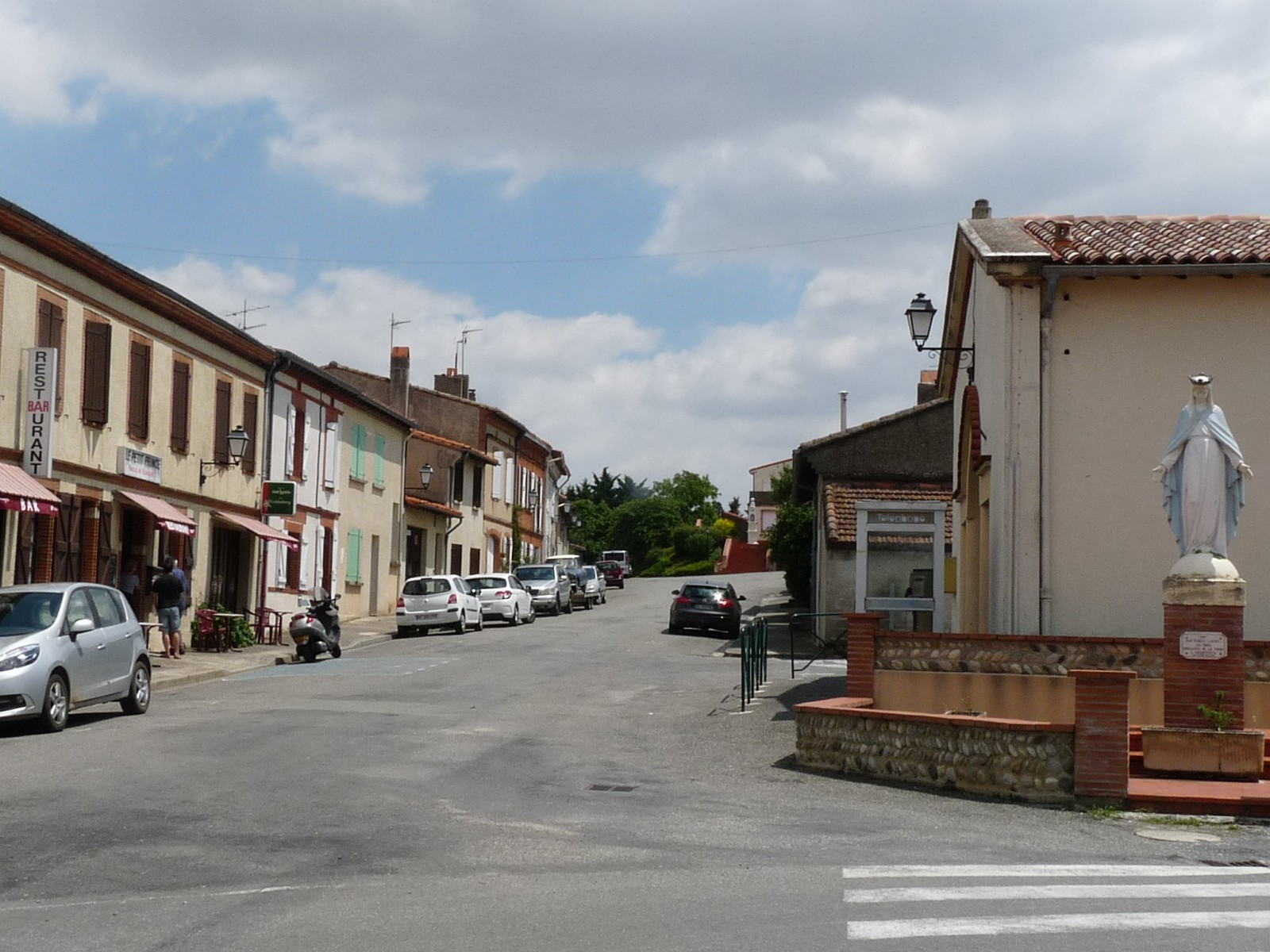
- Toutens

- Coat of arms
- Location of Toutens
- Location within France Location within Occitanie
- Coordinates: 43°28′42″N 1°44′43″E
- Country: France
- Region: Occitania
- Department: Haute-Garonne
- Arrondissement: Toulouse
- Canton: Revel

Government
  - Mayor (2020–2026): Christian Caminade
- Area^{1}: 4.86 km^{2} (1.88 sq mi)
- Elevation: 250 m (820 ft)
- Highest elevation: 283 m (928 ft)
- Lowest elevation: 206 m (676 ft)
- Population (2023): 430
  - Density: 88/km^{2} (230/sq mi)
- Time zone: UTC+01:00 (CET)
  - Summer (DST): UTC+02:00 (CEST)
- INSEE/Postal code: 31558 /31460
- ^{1} French Land Register data, which excludes lakes, ponds, glaciers > 1 km^{2} (0.386 sq mi or 247 acres) and river estuaries.

Toutens (Occitan: Totens) is a commune in the Haute-Garonne department in the Occitanie region in Southwestern France.

== History ==
Toutens was originally a "seigneurie" or Lord of the Manor. In turn this lordship was originally a dependency of the barony of Beauville. It was detached in favour of the De Ver family in 1463 whose descendants by marriage, the De Puybusque, became the Marquises of Toutens. The De Ver family had lived in a château in Toutens since before the mid-16th century, certainly before 1554 and possibly 1503 or even earlier. Then the Marquis de Toutens were more plainly styled the Seigneur de Toutens, feudal lords with considerable rights to collect income and levy justice in their fiefdom.

Then on 28 June 1580, during the French Wars of Religion, the Vicomte de Turenne, a friend and ally of the future King Henry IV of France, led a Protestant (Huguenot) army and attacked several châteaux and forts in the area around Toutens. The château at Toutens was burned and razed.

The present-day château was likely built in the early to mid-18th century by the De Ver family using some of the stone and other material from their feudal château but on another site some 300 metres to the west of the former site.

== Demographics ==
Historical population
Year	Pop.	±% p.a.
1968	129	—
1975	107	−2.64%
1982	149	+4.84%
1990	151	+0.17%
1999	143	−0.60%
2007	172	+2.33%
2012	295	+11.39%
2017	335	+2.58%
2023	430	+4.25%
Source: INSEE

Its inhabitants are called Toutensois (masculine) and Toutensoises (feminine) in French.

== See also ==
- Communes of the Haute-Garonne department
