= Saint-Paul-sur-Save =

- Commune
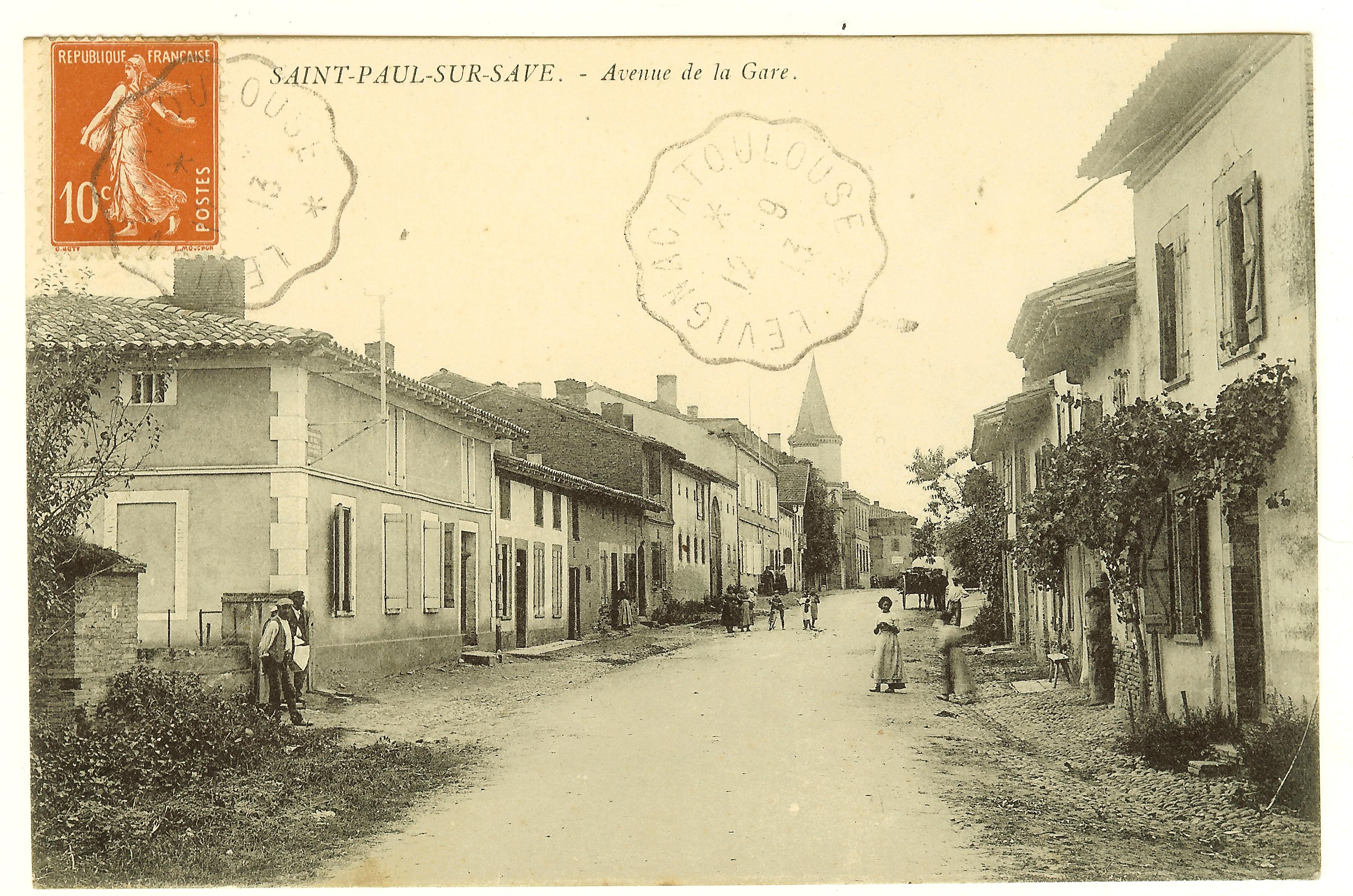
- The Avenue de la Gare around in 1910.

- Coat of arms
- Location of Saint-Paul-sur-Save
- Location within France Location within Occitanie
- Coordinates: 43°41′58″N 1°13′36″E
- Country: France
- Region: Occitania
- Department: Haute-Garonne
- Arrondissement: Toulouse
- Canton: Léguevin

Government
  - Mayor (2020–2026): Jean-Luc Sillien
- Area^{1}: 5.07 km^{2} (1.96 sq mi)
- Elevation: 125 m (410 ft)
- Highest elevation: 173 m (568 ft)
- Lowest elevation: 117 m (384 ft)
- Population (2023): 1,816
  - Density: 358/km^{2} (928/sq mi)
- Time zone: UTC+01:00 (CET)
  - Summer (DST): UTC+02:00 (CEST)
- INSEE/Postal code: 31507 /31530
- ^{1} French Land Register data, which excludes lakes, ponds, glaciers > 1 km^{2} (0.386 sq mi or 247 acres) and river estuaries.

Saint-Paul-sur-Save (French pronunciation: [sɛ̃ pɔl syʁ sav], literally Saint-Paul on Save; Languedocien: Sent Pau de Sava) is a commune in the Haute-Garonne department in southwestern France.

== Population ==
Historical population
Year	Pop.	±% p.a.
1968	260	—
1975	365	+4.97%
1982	569	+6.55%
1990	643	+1.54%
1999	659	+0.27%
2007	959	+4.80%
2012	1,397	+7.81%
2017	1,625	+3.07%
2023	1,816	+1.87%
Source: INSEE

== See also ==
- Communes of the Haute-Garonne department
