= Montclar-Lauragais =

- Commune
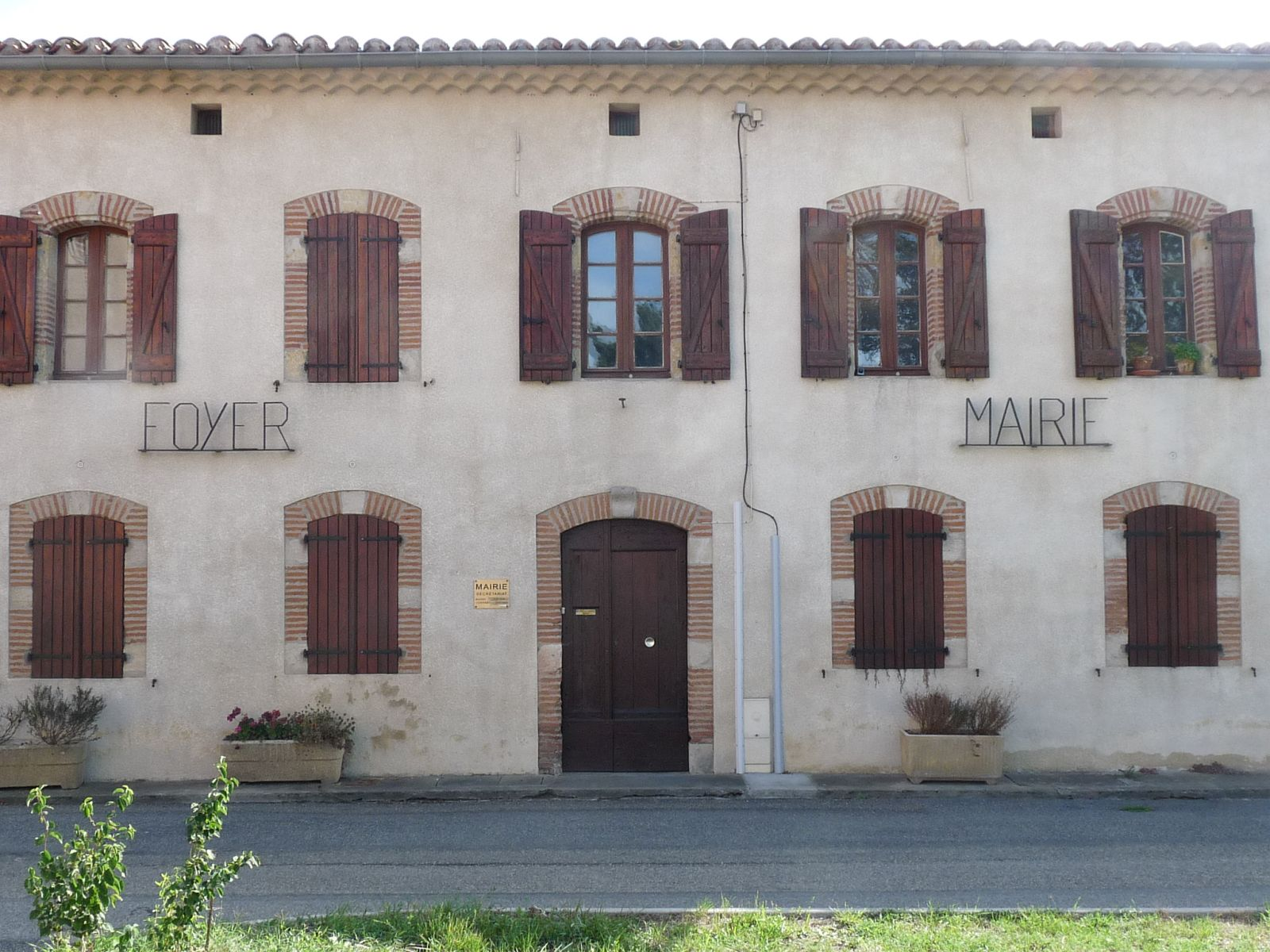
- The town hall in Montclar-Lauragais
- Location of Montclar-Lauragais
- Location within France Location within Occitanie
- Coordinates: 43°21′43″N 1°43′00″E
- Country: France
- Region: Occitania
- Department: Haute-Garonne
- Arrondissement: Toulouse
- Canton: Revel

Government
  - Mayor (2020–2026): David Labatut
- Area^{1}: 3.62 km^{2} (1.40 sq mi)
- Elevation: 190 m (620 ft)
- Highest elevation: 267 m (876 ft)
- Lowest elevation: 177 m (581 ft)
- Population (2023): 253
  - Density: 69.9/km^{2} (181/sq mi)
- Time zone: UTC+01:00 (CET)
  - Summer (DST): UTC+02:00 (CEST)
- INSEE/Postal code: 31368 /31290
- ^{1} French Land Register data, which excludes lakes, ponds, glaciers > 1 km^{2} (0.386 sq mi or 247 acres) and river estuaries.

Montclar-Lauragais (French pronunciation: [mɔ̃klaʁ loʁaɡɛ]; Occitan: Montclar de Lauragués) is a commune in the Haute-Garonne department in southwestern France.

== Population ==
Historical population
Year	Pop.	±% p.a.
1968	75	—
1975	85	+1.80%
1982	92	+1.14%
1990	109	+2.14%
1999	139	+2.74%
2007	208	+5.17%
2012	204	−0.39%
2017	246	+3.82%
2023	253	+0.47%
Source: INSEE

== See also ==
- Communes of the Haute-Garonne department
