= Beauville, Haute-Garonne =

Beauville
- Commune
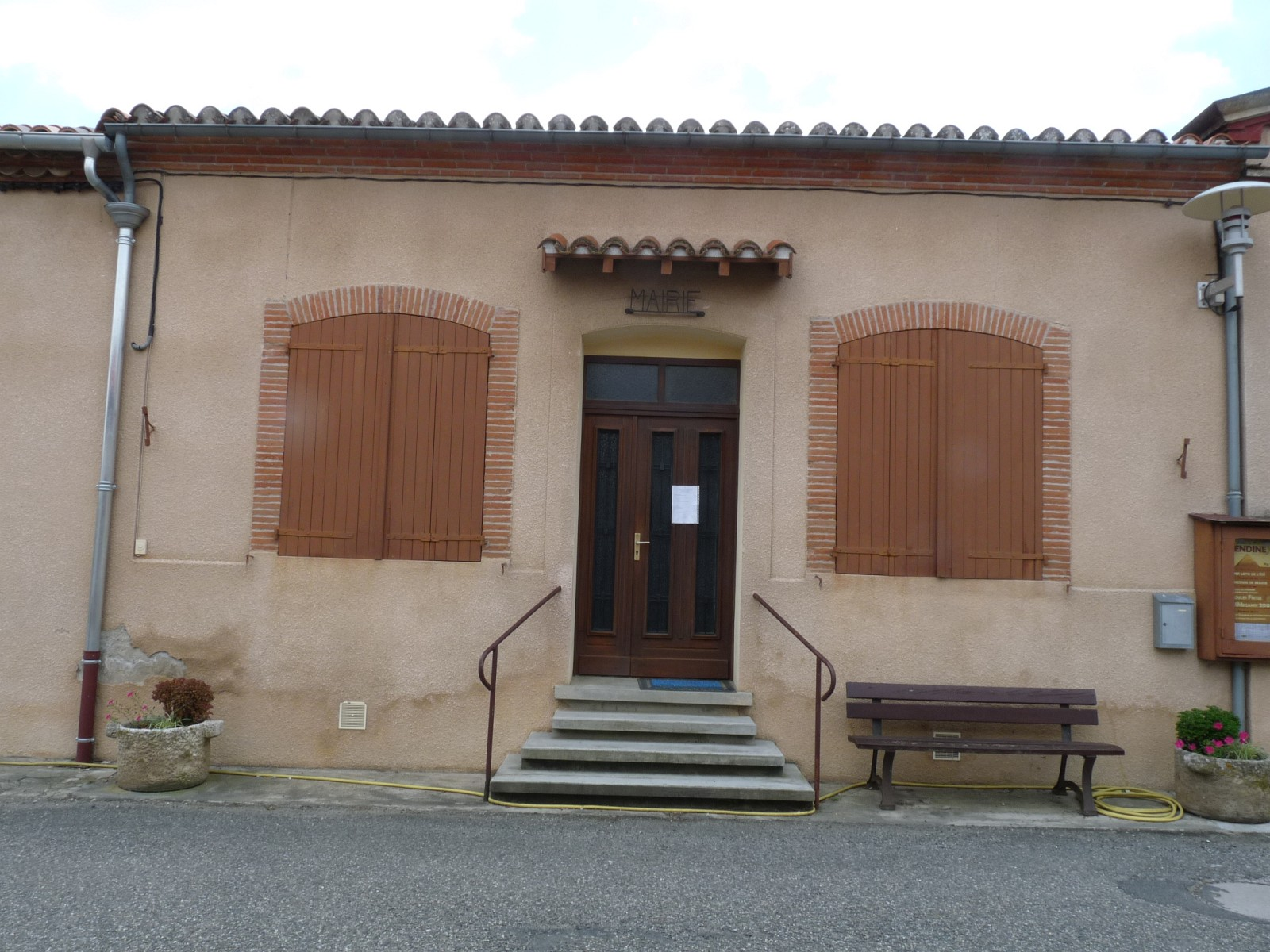
- The town hall in Beauville
- Location of Beauville
- Location within France Location within Occitanie
- Coordinates: 43°28′30″N 1°46′29″E
- Country: France
- Region: Occitania
- Department: Haute-Garonne
- Arrondissement: Toulouse
- Canton: Revel

Government
  - Mayor (2020–2026): Thierry Pous
- Area^{1}: 6.06 km^{2} (2.34 sq mi)
- Elevation: 200 m (660 ft)
- Highest elevation: 291 m (955 ft)
- Lowest elevation: 195 m (640 ft)
- Population (2023): 168
  - Density: 27.7/km^{2} (71.8/sq mi)
- Time zone: UTC+01:00 (CET)
  - Summer (DST): UTC+02:00 (CEST)
- INSEE/Postal code: 31055 /31460
- ^{1} French Land Register data, which excludes lakes, ponds, glaciers > 1 km^{2} (0.386 sq mi or 247 acres) and river estuaries.

Beauville (French pronunciation: [bovil]; Languedocien: Bauvila) is a commune in the Haute-Garonne department in southwestern France.

== Population ==
Historical population
Year	Pop.	±% p.a.
1968	113	—
1975	95	−2.45%
1982	100	+0.74%
1990	82	−2.45%
1999	106	+2.89%
2007	129	+2.49%
2012	147	+2.65%
2017	170	+2.95%
2023	168	−0.20%
Source: INSEE

The inhabitants of the commune are known as Beauvillois.

== See also ==
- Communes of the Haute-Garonne department
