= Renneville, Haute-Garonne =

Renneville
- Commune
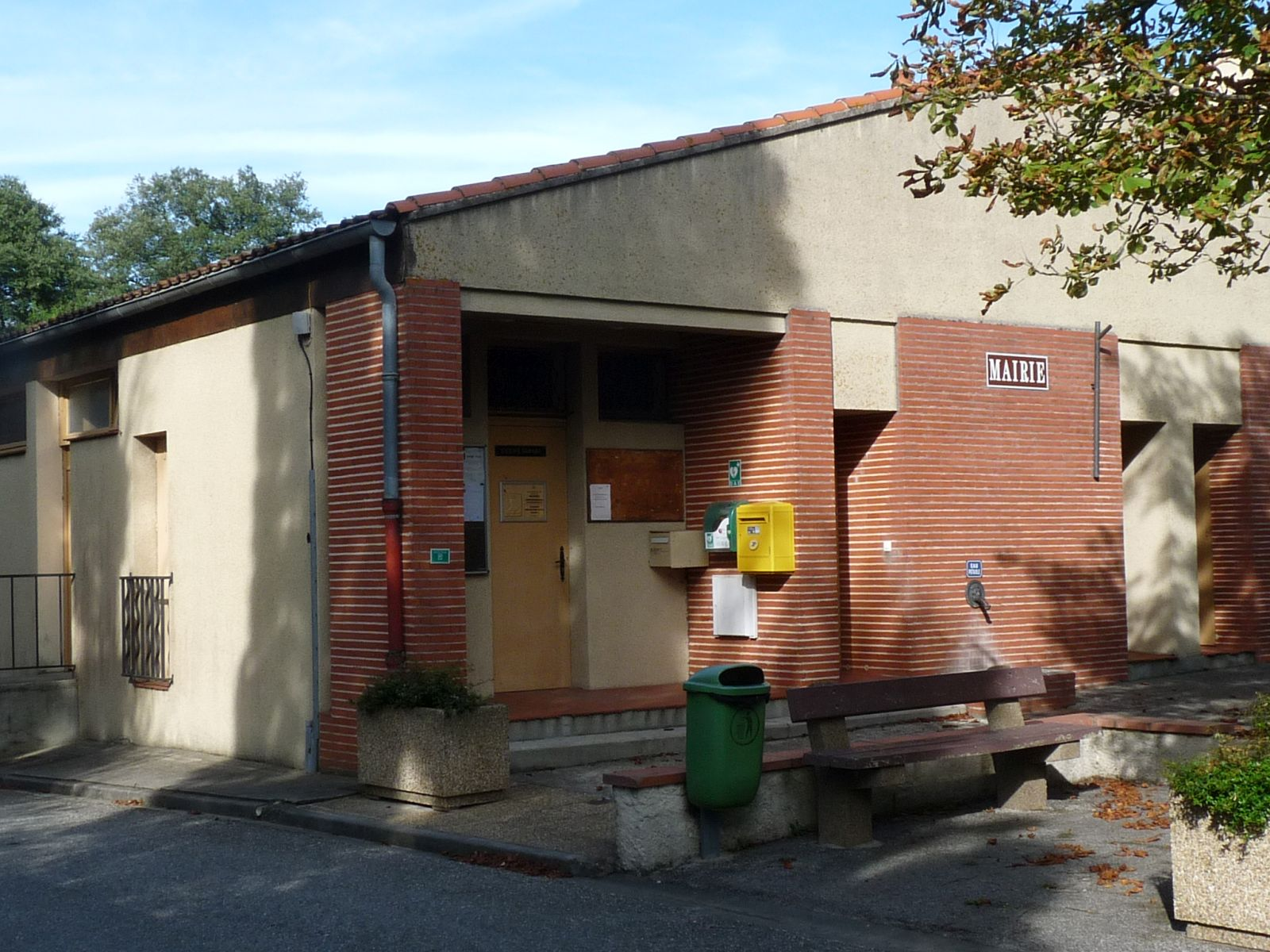
- The town hall in Renneville

- Coat of arms
- Location of Renneville
- Location within France Location within Occitanie
- Coordinates: 43°22′54″N 1°43′28″E
- Country: France
- Region: Occitania
- Department: Haute-Garonne
- Arrondissement: Toulouse
- Canton: Revel

Government
  - Mayor (2020–2026): Francette Ros-Nono
- Area^{1}: 8.42 km^{2} (3.25 sq mi)
- Highest elevation: 273 m (896 ft)
- Lowest elevation: 172 m (564 ft)
- Population (2023): 573
  - Density: 68.1/km^{2} (176/sq mi)
- Time zone: UTC+01:00 (CET)
  - Summer (DST): UTC+02:00 (CEST)
- INSEE/Postal code: 31450 /31290
- ^{1} French Land Register data, which excludes lakes, ponds, glaciers > 1 km^{2} (0.386 sq mi or 247 acres) and river estuaries.

Renneville (French pronunciation: [ʁɛnvil]; Occitan: Renevila) is a commune in the Haute-Garonne department in southwestern France.

== Population ==
Historical population
Year	Pop.	±% p.a.
1968	215	—
1975	222	+0.46%
1982	262	+2.39%
1990	334	+3.08%
1999	334	+0.00%
2007	461	+4.11%
2012	520	+2.44%
2017	550	+1.13%
2023	573	+0.69%
Source: INSEE

== See also ==
- Communes of the Haute-Garonne department
