= Montlaur, Haute-Garonne =

Montlaur
- Commune
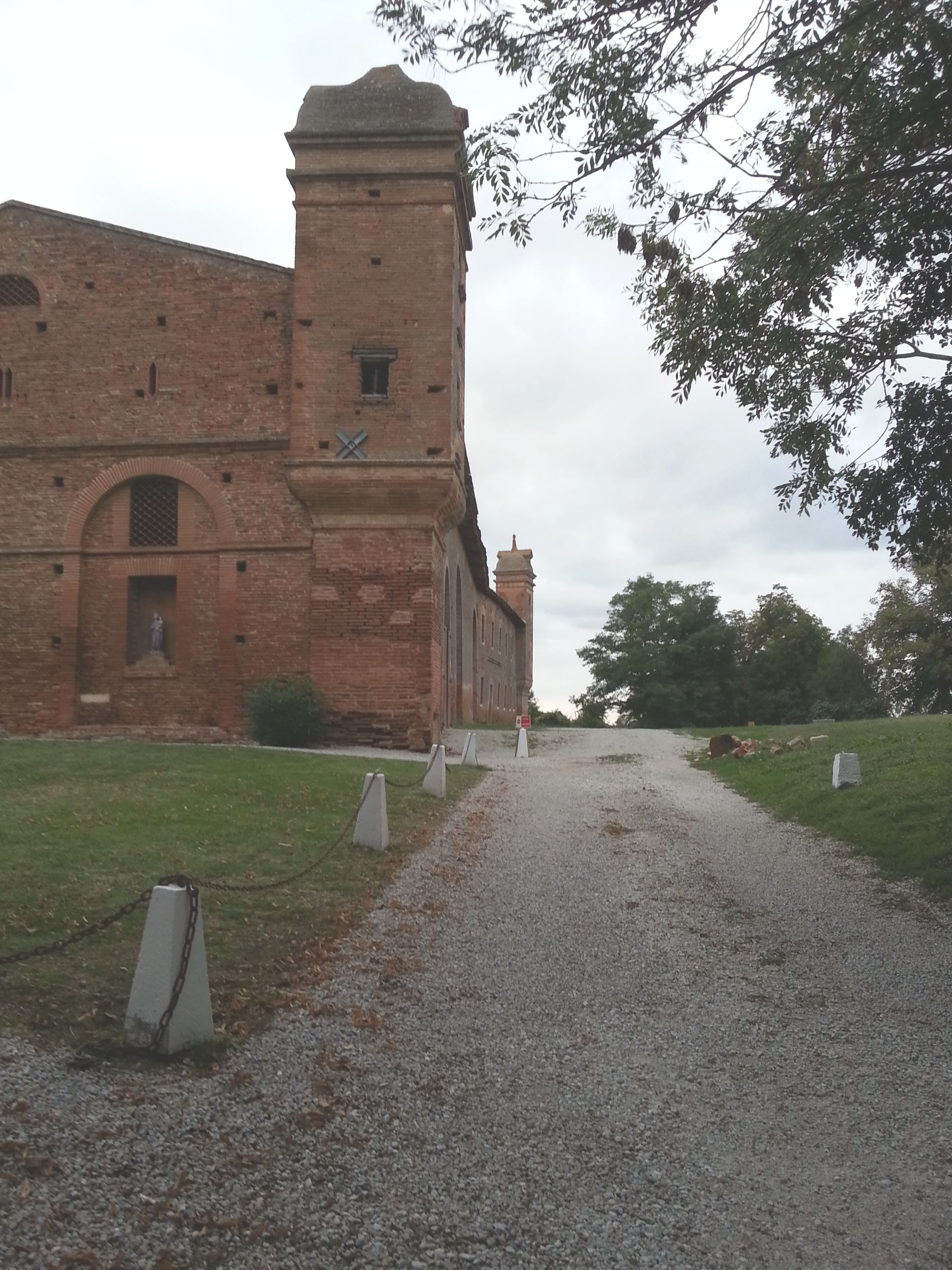
- Chateau

- Coat of arms
- Location of Montlaur
- Location within France Location within Occitanie
- Coordinates: 43°29′21″N 1°34′19″E
- Country: France
- Region: Occitania
- Department: Haute-Garonne
- Arrondissement: Toulouse
- Canton: Escalquens
- Intercommunality: CA Sicoval

Government
  - Mayor (2023–2026): Arnaud Humbert-Droz
- Area^{1}: 9.61 km^{2} (3.71 sq mi)
- Elevation: 158 m (518 ft)
- Highest elevation: 227 m (745 ft)
- Lowest elevation: 149 m (489 ft)
- Population (2023): 1,791
  - Density: 186/km^{2} (483/sq mi)
- Time zone: UTC+01:00 (CET)
  - Summer (DST): UTC+02:00 (CEST)
- INSEE/Postal code: 31384 /31450
- ^{1} French Land Register data, which excludes lakes, ponds, glaciers > 1 km^{2} (0.386 sq mi or 247 acres) and river estuaries.

Montlaur (French pronunciation: [mɔ̃lɔʁ]) is a commune in the Haute-Garonne department of southwestern France. Montlaur station has rail connections to Toulouse, Carcassonne and Narbonne.

== Population ==
Historical population
Year	Pop.	±% p.a.
1968	403	—
1975	527	+3.91%
1982	646	+2.95%
1990	807	+2.82%
1999	889	+1.08%
2007	1,212	+3.95%
2012	1,185	−0.45%
2017	1,576	+5.87%
2023	1,791	+2.15%
Source: INSEE

== See also ==
- Communes of the Haute-Garonne department
