= Montégut-Lauragais =

- Commune
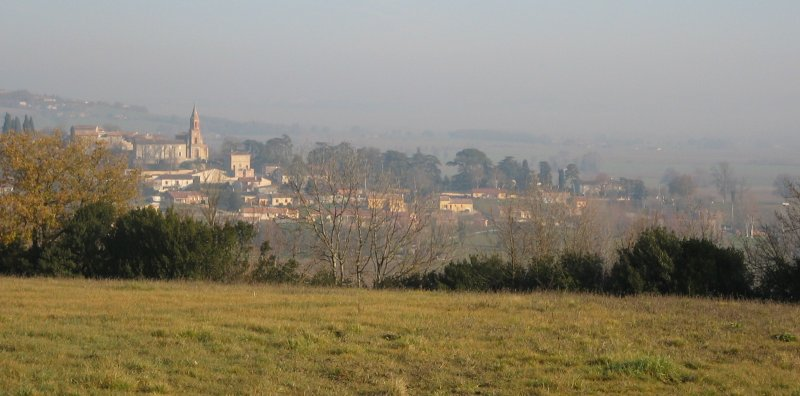
- A general view of Montégut-Lauragais

- Coat of arms
- Location of Montégut-Lauragais
- Location within France Location within Occitanie
- Coordinates: 43°28′47″N 1°55′26″E
- Country: France
- Region: Occitania
- Department: Haute-Garonne
- Arrondissement: Toulouse
- Canton: Revel
- Intercommunality: CC aux sources du Canal du Midi

Government
  - Mayor (2020–2026): Philippe Barbaste
- Area^{1}: 7.72 km^{2} (2.98 sq mi)
- Elevation: 215 m (705 ft)
- Highest elevation: 258 m (846 ft)
- Lowest elevation: 188 m (617 ft)
- Population (2023): 400
  - Density: 52/km^{2} (130/sq mi)
- Time zone: UTC+01:00 (CET)
  - Summer (DST): UTC+02:00 (CEST)
- INSEE/Postal code: 31371 /31540
- ^{1} French Land Register data, which excludes lakes, ponds, glaciers > 1 km^{2} (0.386 sq mi or 247 acres) and river estuaries.

Montégut-Lauragais (French pronunciation: [mɔ̃teɡy loʁaɡɛ]; Occitan: Montagut de Lauragués) is a commune in the Haute-Garonne department in southwestern France.

== Population ==
Historical population
Year	Pop.	±% p.a.
1968	296	—
1975	316	+0.94%
1982	342	+1.14%
1990	342	+0.00%
1999	360	+0.57%
2007	444	+2.66%
2012	473	+1.27%
2017	442	−1.35%
2023	400	−1.65%
Source: INSEE

== Notable people ==
- Pierre Duèze, Lord of Montbrun, (1244-1326)
- Shaul Harel, (1937- ) Neuropediatrician in Tel-Aviv, past-president of the Child Neurology Society. He and his family were hosted by the inhabitants and the local Authority and they lived in the village presbytery during the World-War II exodus (May–October 1940). His name by then was Charlie Hilsberg. As he and his family went back to Brussels thereafter, he survived war with the help of the Comité de Défense des Juifs and notably to Andrée Geulen-Herscovici, an active resistant.

== See also ==
- Communes of the Haute-Garonne department
