= Montaigut-sur-Save =

- Commune
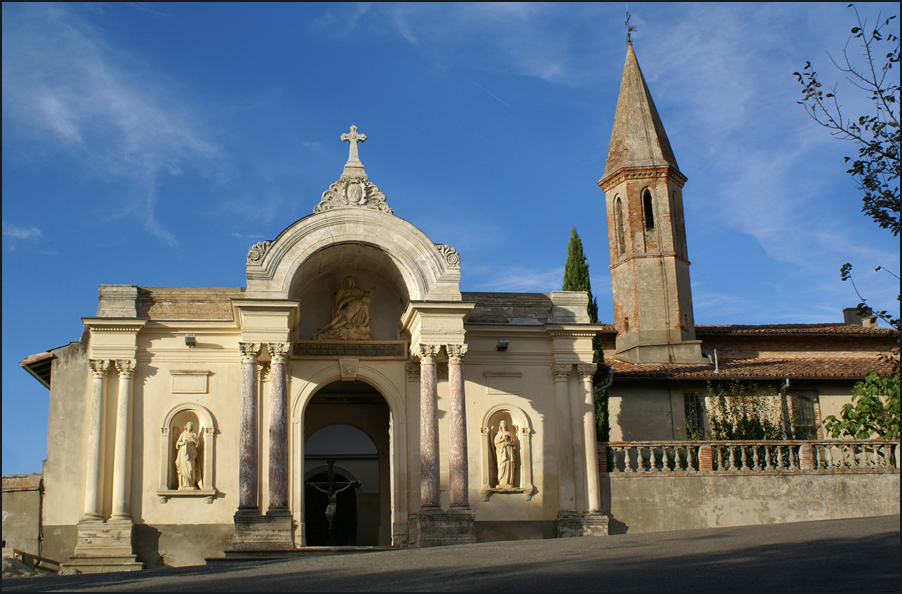
- The chapel in Montaigut-sur-Save

- Coat of arms
- Location of Montaigut-sur-Save
- Location within France Location within Occitanie
- Coordinates: 43°41′32″N 1°13′53″E
- Country: France
- Region: Occitania
- Department: Haute-Garonne
- Arrondissement: Toulouse
- Canton: Léguevin

Government
  - Mayor (2020–2026): François Codine
- Area^{1}: 12.65 km^{2} (4.88 sq mi)
- Elevation: 125 m (410 ft)
- Highest elevation: 194 m (636 ft)
- Lowest elevation: 116 m (381 ft)
- Population (2023): 1,984
  - Density: 156.8/km^{2} (406.2/sq mi)
- Time zone: UTC+01:00 (CET)
  - Summer (DST): UTC+02:00 (CEST)
- INSEE/Postal code: 31356 /31530
- ^{1} French Land Register data, which excludes lakes, ponds, glaciers > 1 km^{2} (0.386 sq mi or 247 acres) and river estuaries.

Montaigut-sur-Save (French pronunciation: [mɔ̃tɛɡy syʁ sav], literally Montaigut on Save; Occitan: Montagut de Sava) is a commune in the Haute-Garonne department in southwestern France.

== Population ==
Historical population
Year	Pop.	±% p.a.
1968	419	—
1975	589	+4.99%
1982	724	+2.99%
1990	972	+3.75%
1999	1,201	+2.38%
2007	1,530	+3.07%
2012	1,581	+0.66%
2017	1,682	+1.25%
2023	1,984	+2.79%
Source: INSEE

== See also ==
- Communes of the Haute-Garonne department
