= Loubens-Lauragais =

Loubens-Lauragais Lobenç (Occitan)
- Commune
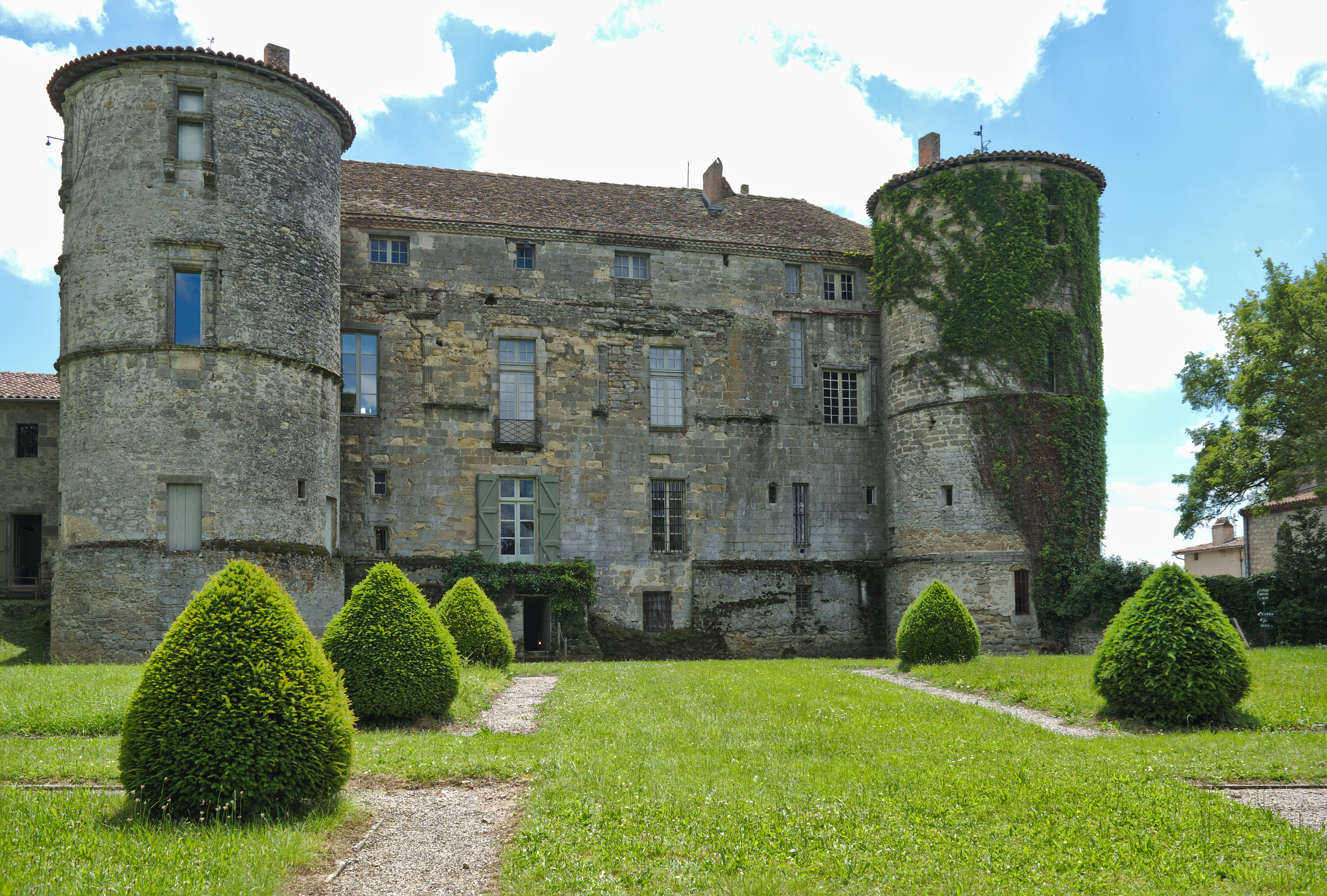
- The Castle of Loubens, in Loubens-Lauragais

- Coat of arms
- Location of Loubens-Lauragais
- Location within France Location within Occitanie
- Coordinates: 43°34′27″N 1°47′10″E
- Country: France
- Region: Occitania
- Department: Haute-Garonne
- Arrondissement: Toulouse
- Canton: Revel

Government
  - Mayor (2020–2026): Laurent Ferlicot
- Area^{1}: 6.47 km^{2} (2.50 sq mi)
- Elevation: 200 m (660 ft)
- Highest elevation: 245 m (804 ft)
- Lowest elevation: 164 m (538 ft)
- Population (2023): 454
  - Density: 70.2/km^{2} (182/sq mi)
- Time zone: UTC+01:00 (CET)
  - Summer (DST): UTC+02:00 (CEST)
- INSEE/Postal code: 31304 /31460
- ^{1} French Land Register data, which excludes lakes, ponds, glaciers > 1 km^{2} (0.386 sq mi or 247 acres) and river estuaries.

Loubens-Lauragais (Occitan: Lobenç) is a commune in the Haute-Garonne department in southwestern France.

== Demography ==
Historical population
Year	Pop.	±% p.a.
1968	185	—
1975	189	+0.31%
1982	233	+3.04%
1990	248	+0.78%
1999	324	+3.01%
2007	390	+2.34%
2012	423	+1.64%
2017	461	+1.74%
2023	454	−0.25%
Source: INSEE

== See also ==
- Communes of the Haute-Garonne department
