= Larra, Haute-Garonne =

Larra
- Commune
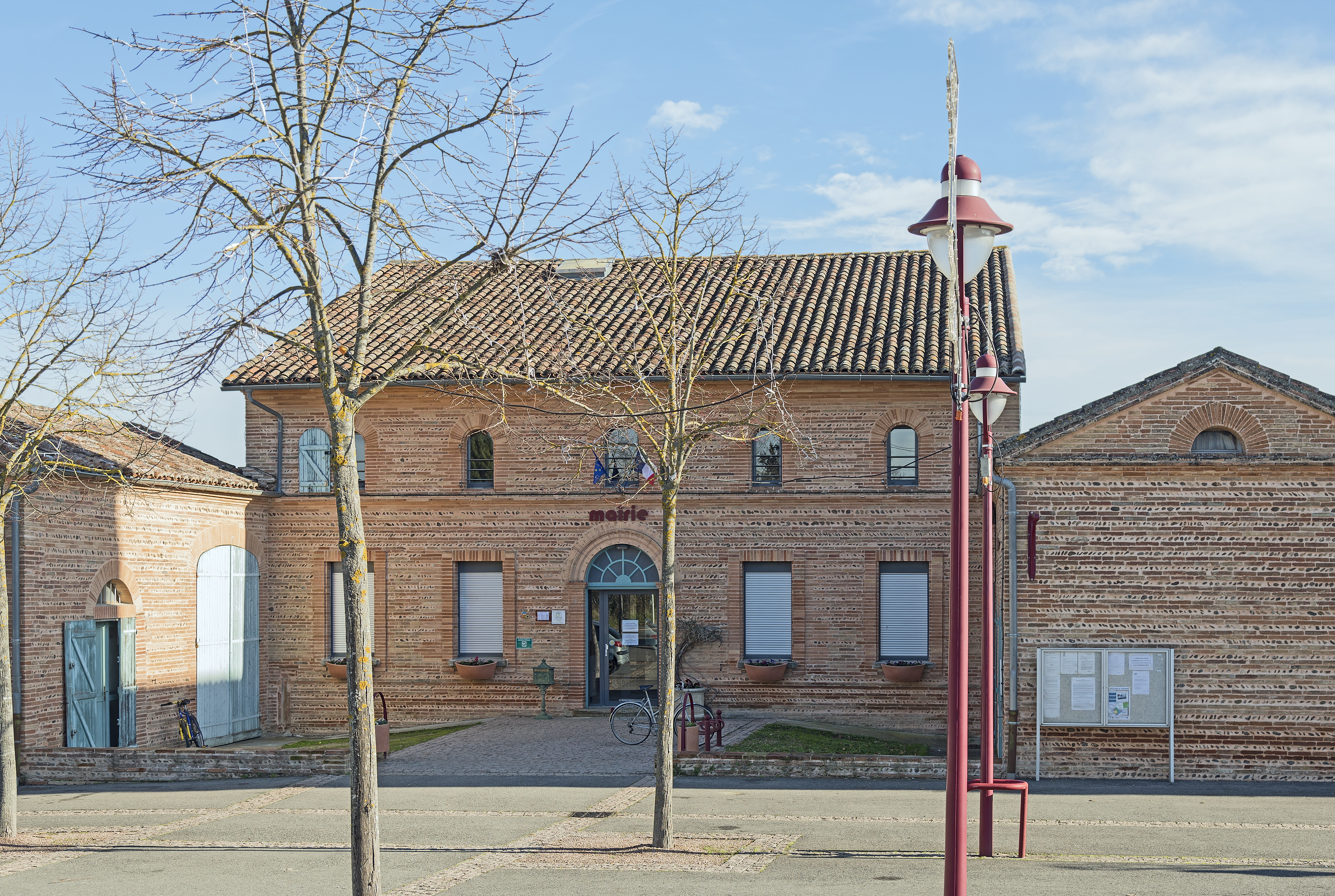
- The town hall in Larra

- Coat of arms
- Location of Larra
- Location within France Location within Occitanie
- Coordinates: 43°44′23″N 1°13′55″E
- Country: France
- Region: Occitania
- Department: Haute-Garonne
- Arrondissement: Toulouse
- Canton: Léguevin

Government
  - Mayor (2020–2026): Jean-Louis Moign
- Area^{1}: 16.36 km^{2} (6.32 sq mi)
- Elevation: 113 m (371 ft)
- Highest elevation: 181 m (594 ft)
- Lowest elevation: 110 m (360 ft)
- Population (2023): 2,273
  - Density: 138.9/km^{2} (359.8/sq mi)
- Time zone: UTC+01:00 (CET)
  - Summer (DST): UTC+02:00 (CEST)
- INSEE/Postal code: 31592 /31330
- ^{1} French Land Register data, which excludes lakes, ponds, glaciers > 1 km^{2} (0.386 sq mi or 247 acres) and river estuaries.

Larra (French pronunciation: [laʁa]; Occitan: Larran) is a commune in the Haute-Garonne department in southwestern France. It was created in 1955 from part of the commune of Grenade.

== Population ==
Historical population
Year	Pop.	±% p.a.
1968	324	—
1975	348	+1.03%
1982	674	+9.90%
1990	955	+4.45%
1999	1,131	+1.90%
2007	1,360	+2.33%
2012	1,519	+2.24%
2017	1,891	+4.48%
2023	2,273	+3.11%
Source: INSEE

== Sights ==
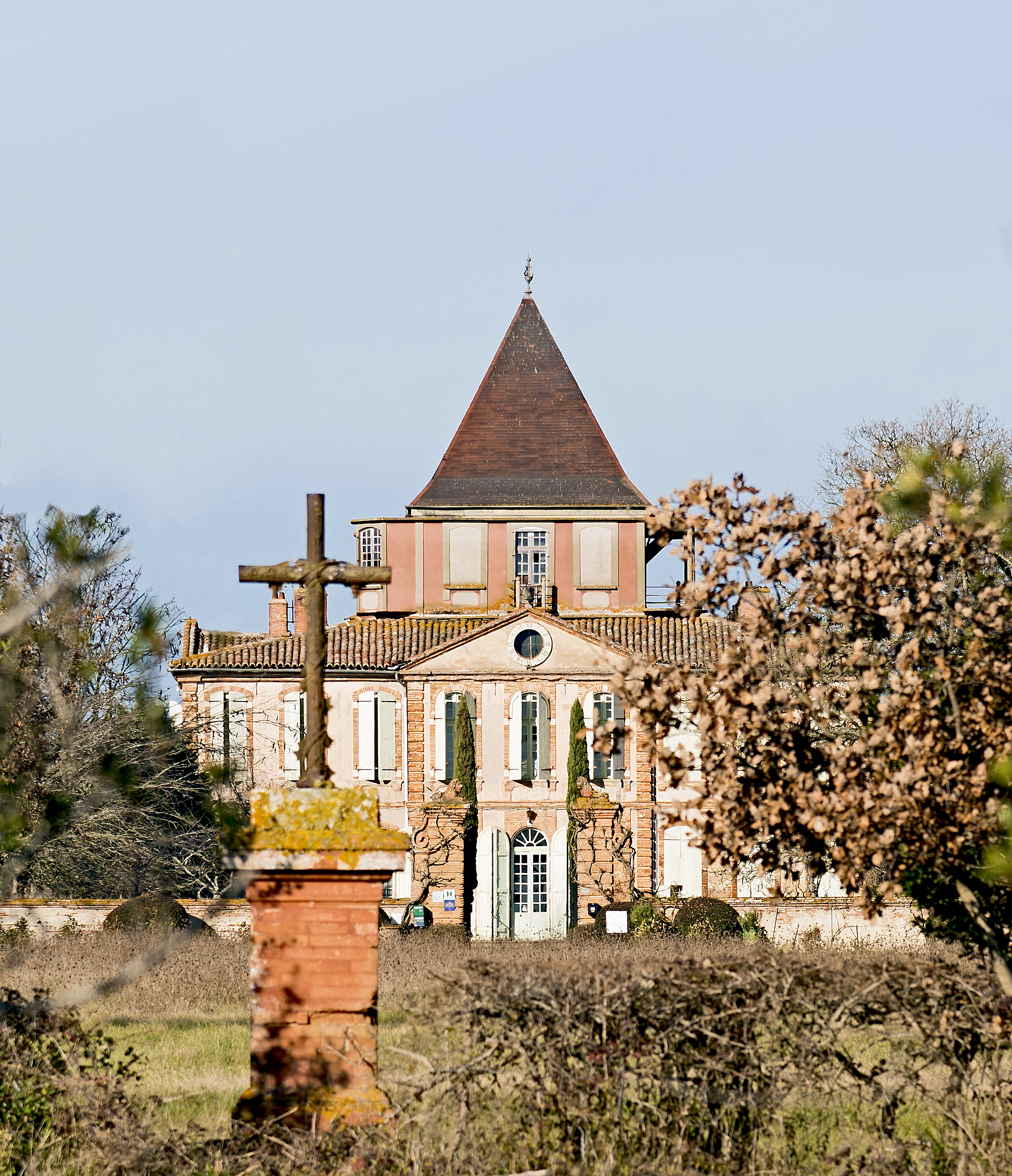
Castle

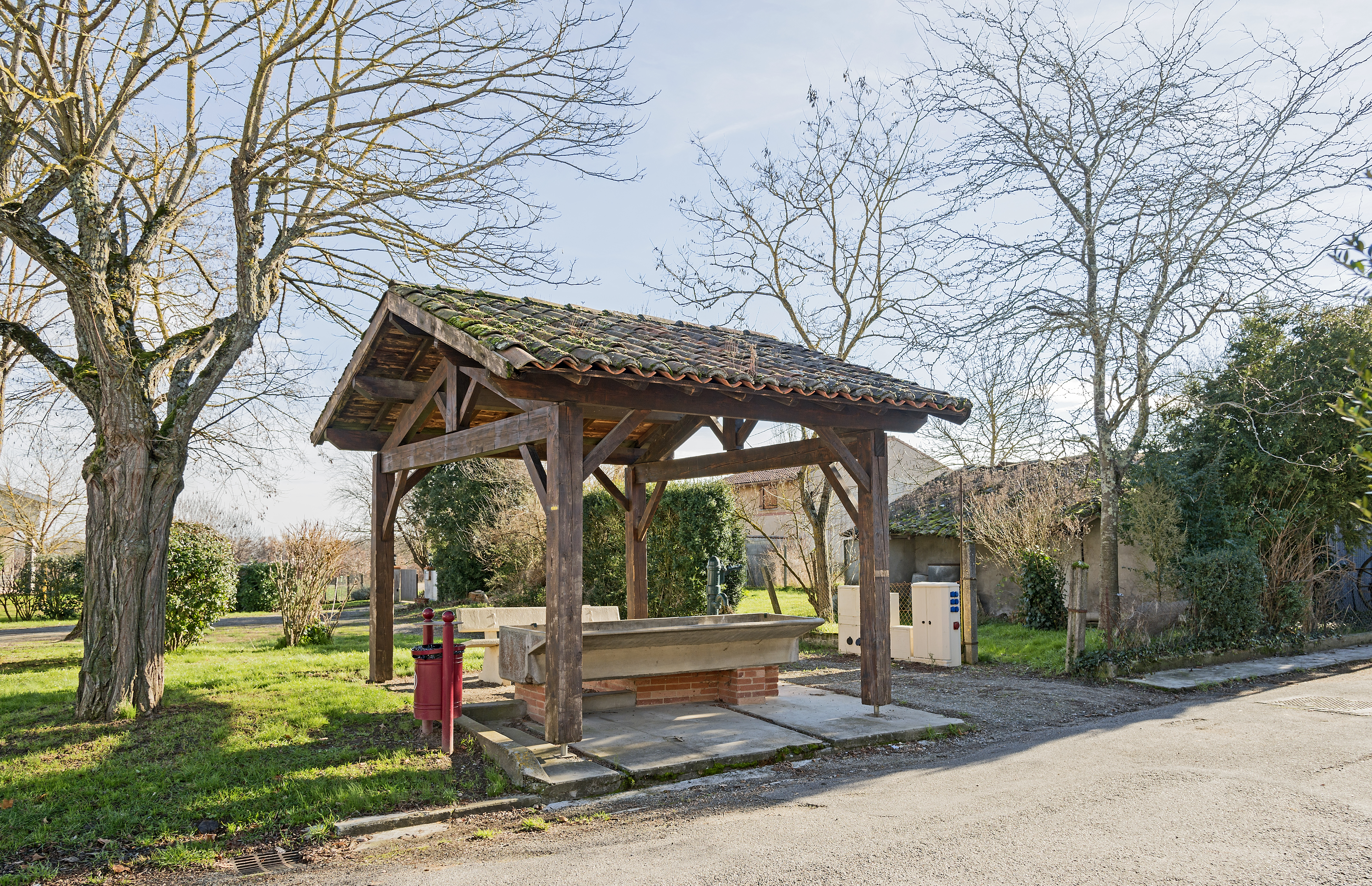
Laundry

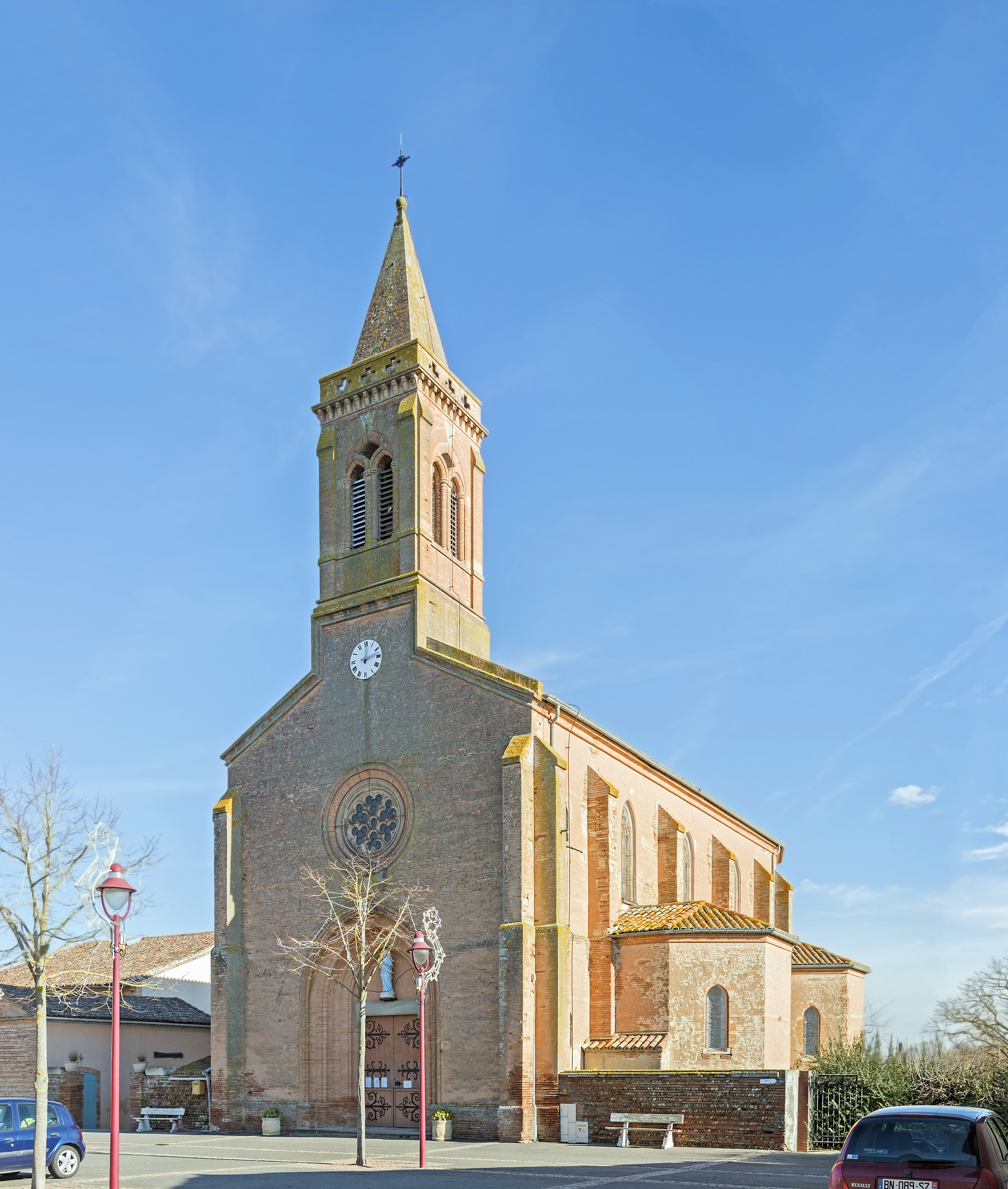
Church

== See also ==
- Communes of the Haute-Garonne department
