= Le Faget =

- Commune
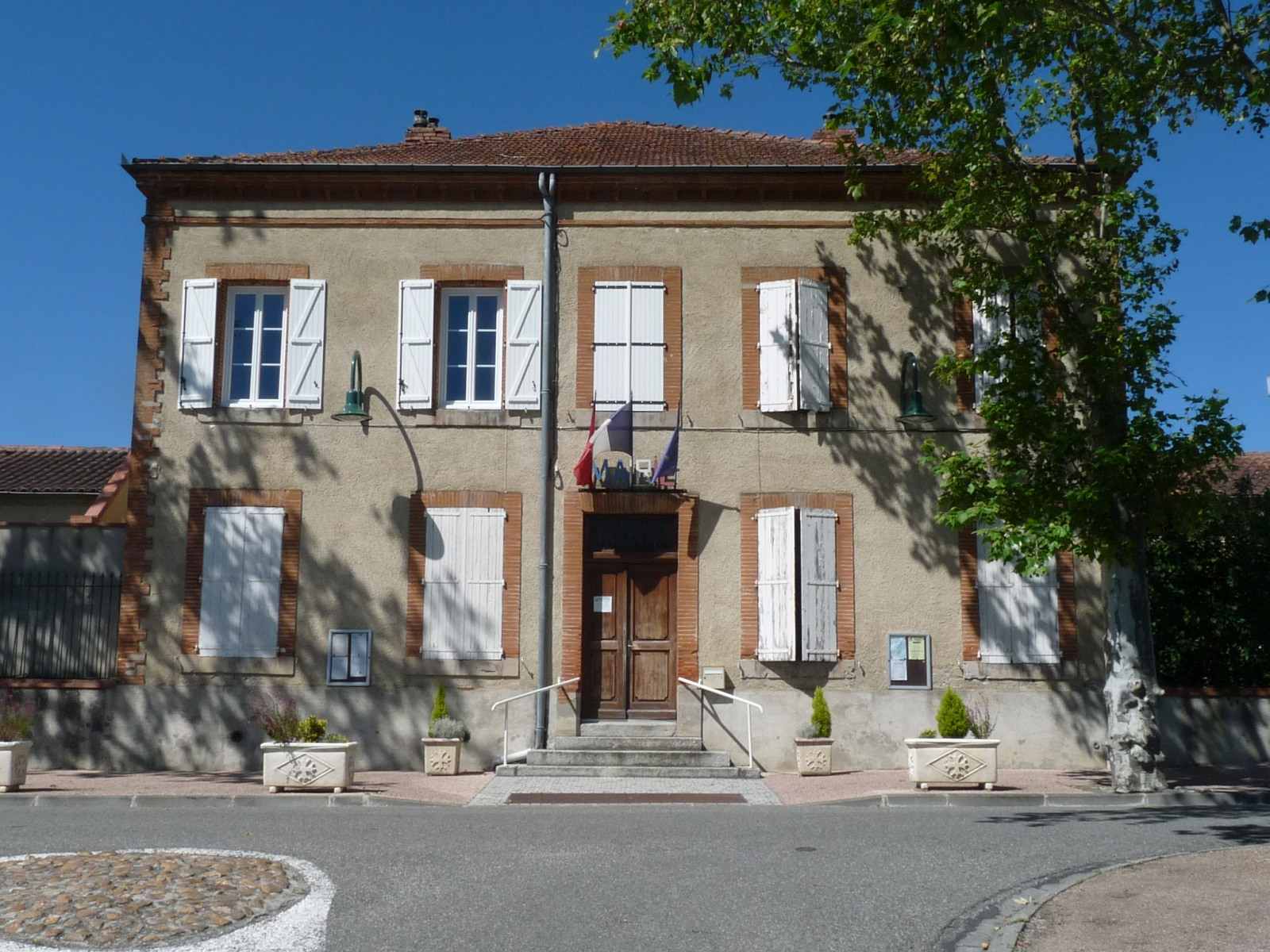
- The town hall in Le Faget

- Coat of arms
- Location of Le Faget
- Location within France Location within Occitanie
- Coordinates: 43°34′07″N 1°49′27″E
- Country: France
- Region: Occitania
- Department: Haute-Garonne
- Arrondissement: Toulouse
- Canton: Revel

Government
  - Mayor (2020–2026): Francis Calmettes
- Area^{1}: 11.31 km^{2} (4.37 sq mi)
- Elevation: 262 m (860 ft)
- Highest elevation: 275 m (902 ft)
- Lowest elevation: 170 m (560 ft)
- Population (2023): 297
  - Density: 26.3/km^{2} (68.0/sq mi)
- Time zone: UTC+01:00 (CET)
  - Summer (DST): UTC+02:00 (CEST)
- INSEE/Postal code: 31179 /31460
- ^{1} French Land Register data, which excludes lakes, ponds, glaciers > 1 km^{2} (0.386 sq mi or 247 acres) and river estuaries.

Le Faget (French pronunciation: [lə faʒɛ]) is a commune in the Haute-Garonne department in southwestern France.

== Population ==
Historical population
Year	Pop.	±% p.a.
1968	270	—
1975	280	+0.52%
1982	329	+2.33%
1990	363	+1.24%
1999	279	−2.88%
2007	342	+2.58%
2012	374	+1.80%
2017	343	−1.72%
2023	297	−2.37%
Source: INSEE

== See also ==
- Communes of the Haute-Garonne department
