= Mascarville =

- Commune
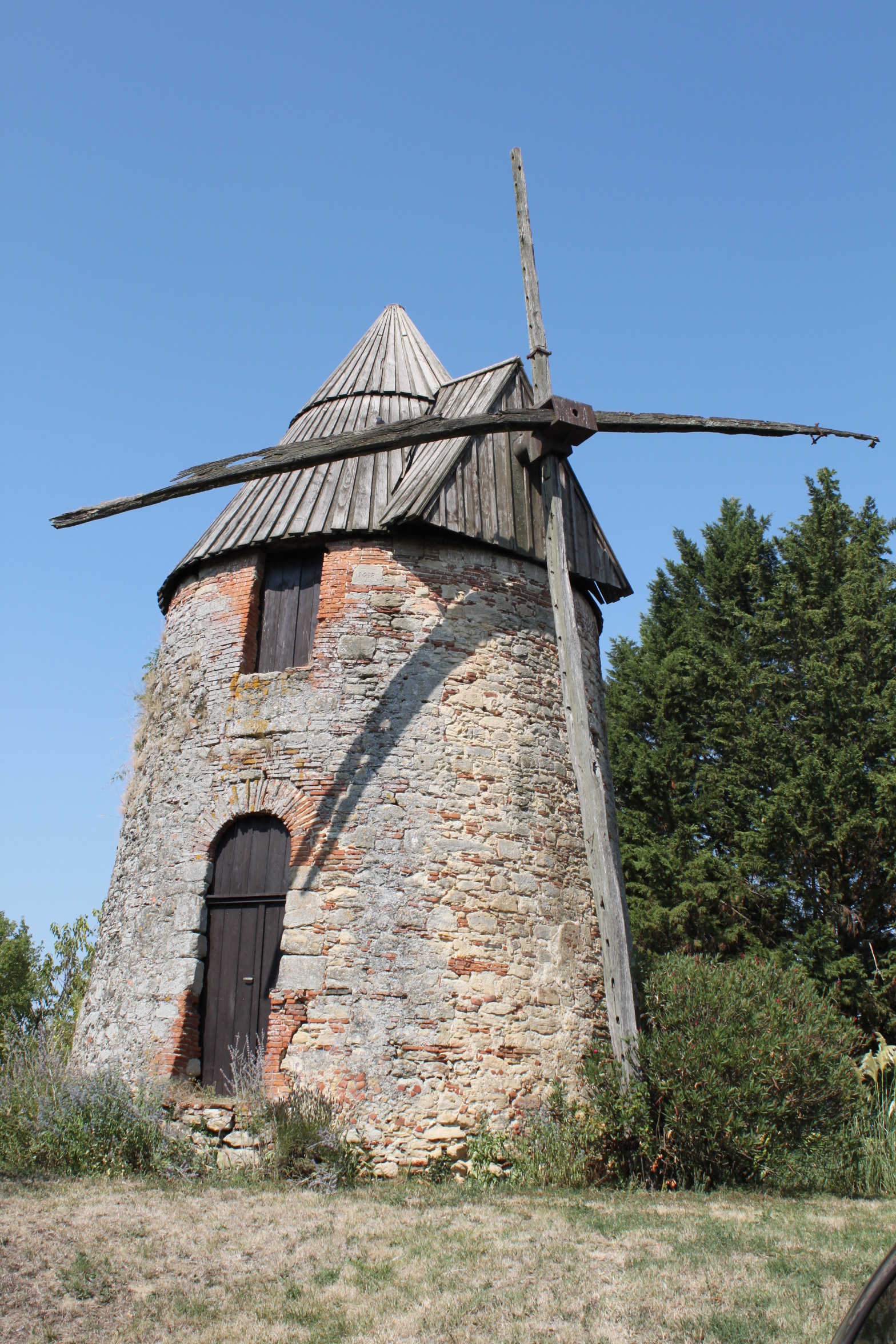
- The windmill in
- Location of Mascarville
- Location within France Location within Occitanie
- Coordinates: 43°33′18″N 1°45′33″E
- Country: France
- Region: Occitania
- Department: Haute-Garonne
- Arrondissement: Toulouse
- Canton: Revel

Government
  - Mayor (2020–2026): Serge Cazeneuve
- Area^{1}: 5.27 km^{2} (2.03 sq mi)
- Elevation: 232 m (761 ft)
- Highest elevation: 281 m (922 ft)
- Lowest elevation: 175 m (574 ft)
- Population (2023): 179
  - Density: 34.0/km^{2} (88.0/sq mi)
- Time zone: UTC+01:00 (CET)
  - Summer (DST): UTC+02:00 (CEST)
- INSEE/Postal code: 31325 /31460
- ^{1} French Land Register data, which excludes lakes, ponds, glaciers > 1 km^{2} (0.386 sq mi or 247 acres) and river estuaries.

Mascarville is a commune in the Haute-Garonne department in southwestern France.

== Population ==
Historical population
Year	Pop.	±% p.a.
1968	117	—
1975	82	−4.95%
1982	74	−1.46%
1990	98	+3.57%
1999	139	+3.96%
2007	198	+4.52%
2012	167	−3.35%
2017	179	+1.40%
2023	179	+0.00%
Source: INSEE

== Monuments ==
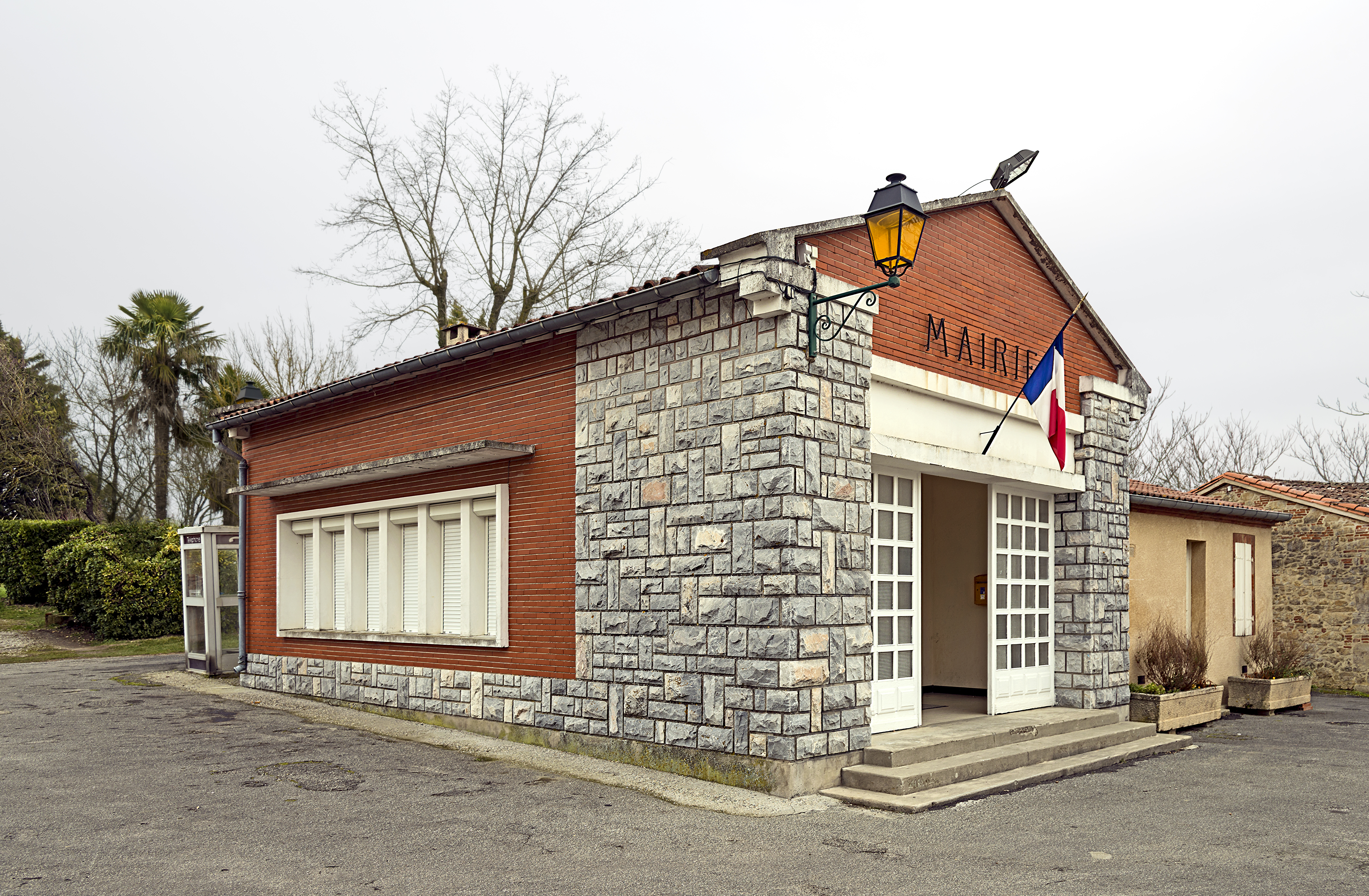
Town hall

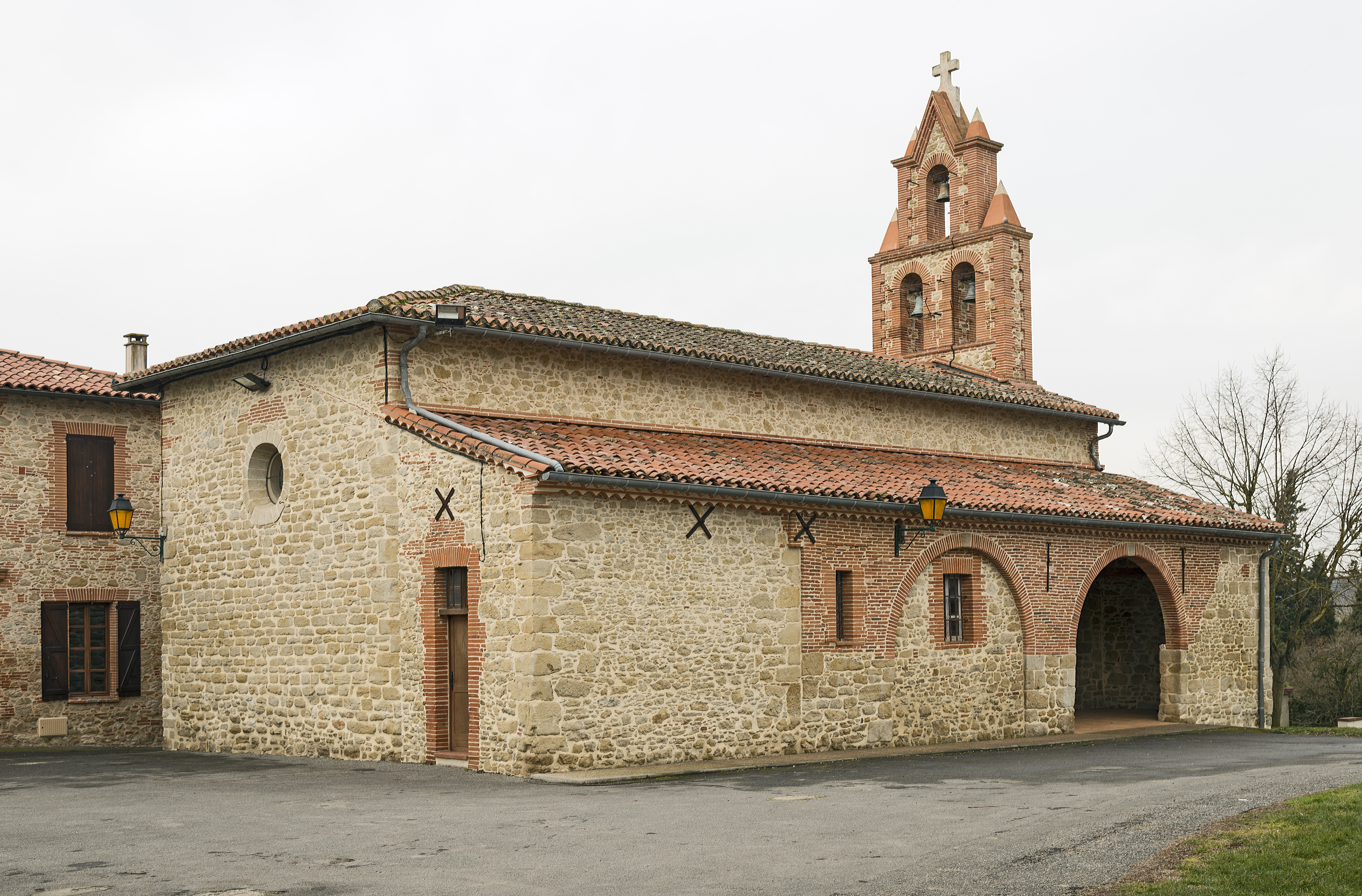
Church Saint-Étienne

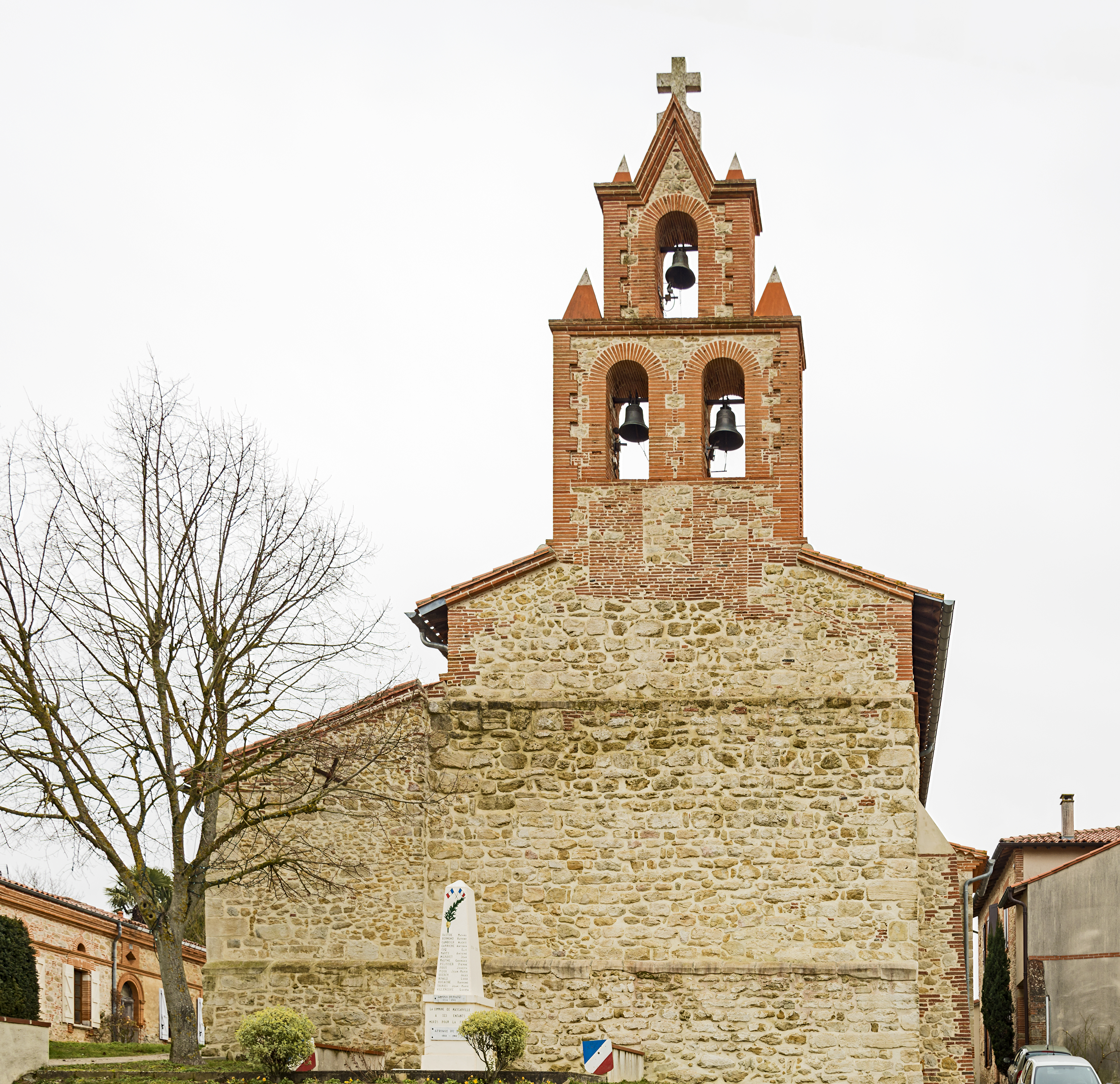
Bell gable

== See also ==
- Communes of the Haute-Garonne department
