= Juzes =

- Commune
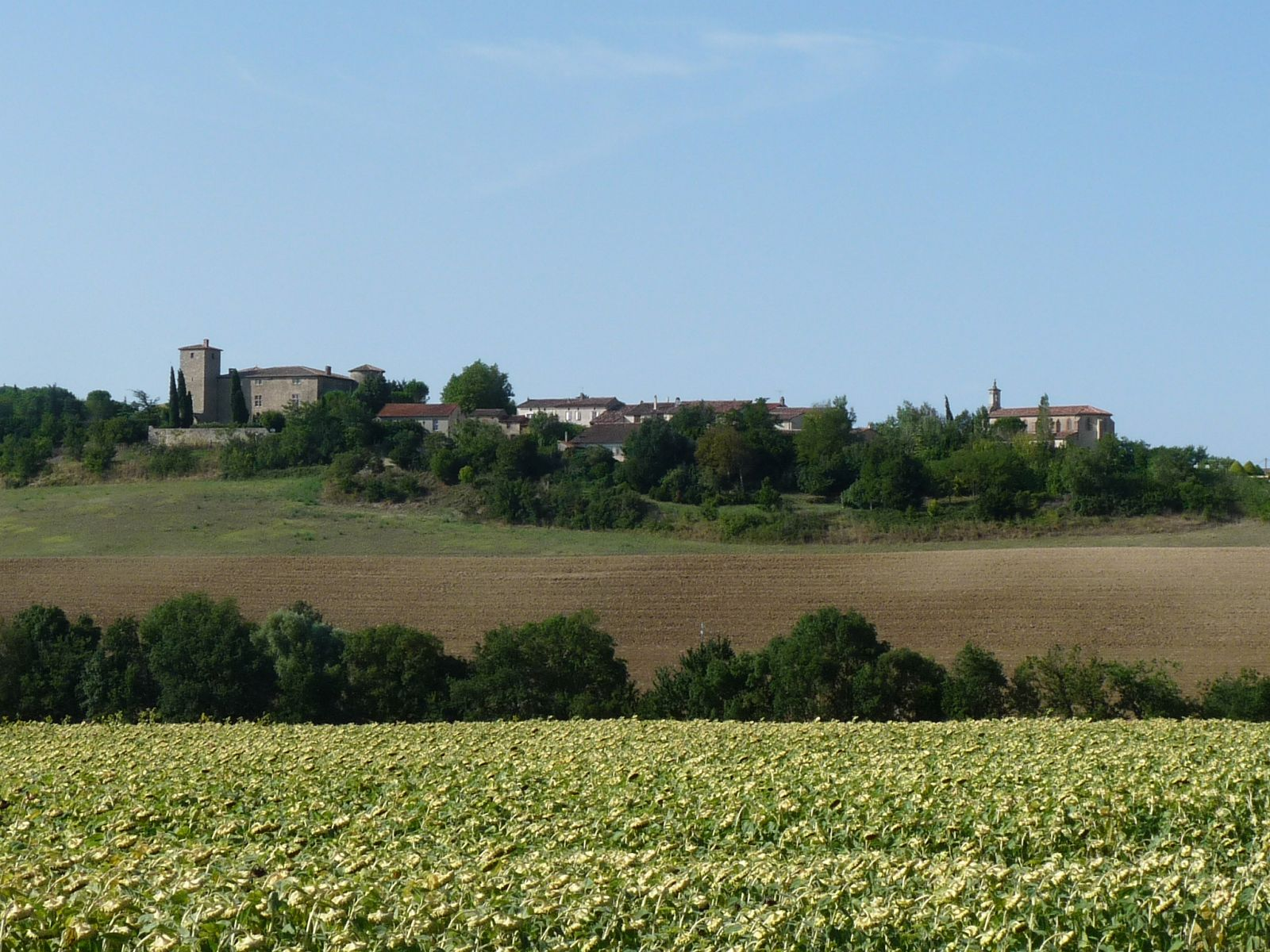
- A general view of Juzes

- Coat of arms
- Location of Juzes
- Location within France Location within Occitanie
- Coordinates: 43°27′01″N 1°47′28″E
- Country: France
- Region: Occitania
- Department: Haute-Garonne
- Arrondissement: Toulouse
- Canton: Revel
- Intercommunality: CC aux sources du Canal du Midi

Government
  - Mayor (2020–2026): Vincent Jonquieres
- Area^{1}: 3.75 km^{2} (1.45 sq mi)
- Elevation: 230 m (750 ft)
- Highest elevation: 251 m (823 ft)
- Lowest elevation: 195 m (640 ft)
- Population (2023): 73
  - Density: 19/km^{2} (50/sq mi)
- Time zone: UTC+01:00 (CET)
  - Summer (DST): UTC+02:00 (CEST)
- INSEE/Postal code: 31243 /31540
- ^{1} French Land Register data, which excludes lakes, ponds, glaciers > 1 km^{2} (0.386 sq mi or 247 acres) and river estuaries.

Juzes (French pronunciation: [ʒyz]; Occitan: Jusas) is a commune in the Haute-Garonne department in southwestern France.

== Population ==
Historical population
Year	Pop.	±% p.a.
1968	97	—
1975	92	−0.75%
1982	91	−0.16%
1990	72	−2.88%
1999	84	+1.73%
2007	93	+1.28%
2012	82	−2.49%
2017	85	+0.72%
2023	73	−2.50%
Source: INSEE

== See also ==
Communes of the Haute-Garonne department
