= Francarville =

- Commune
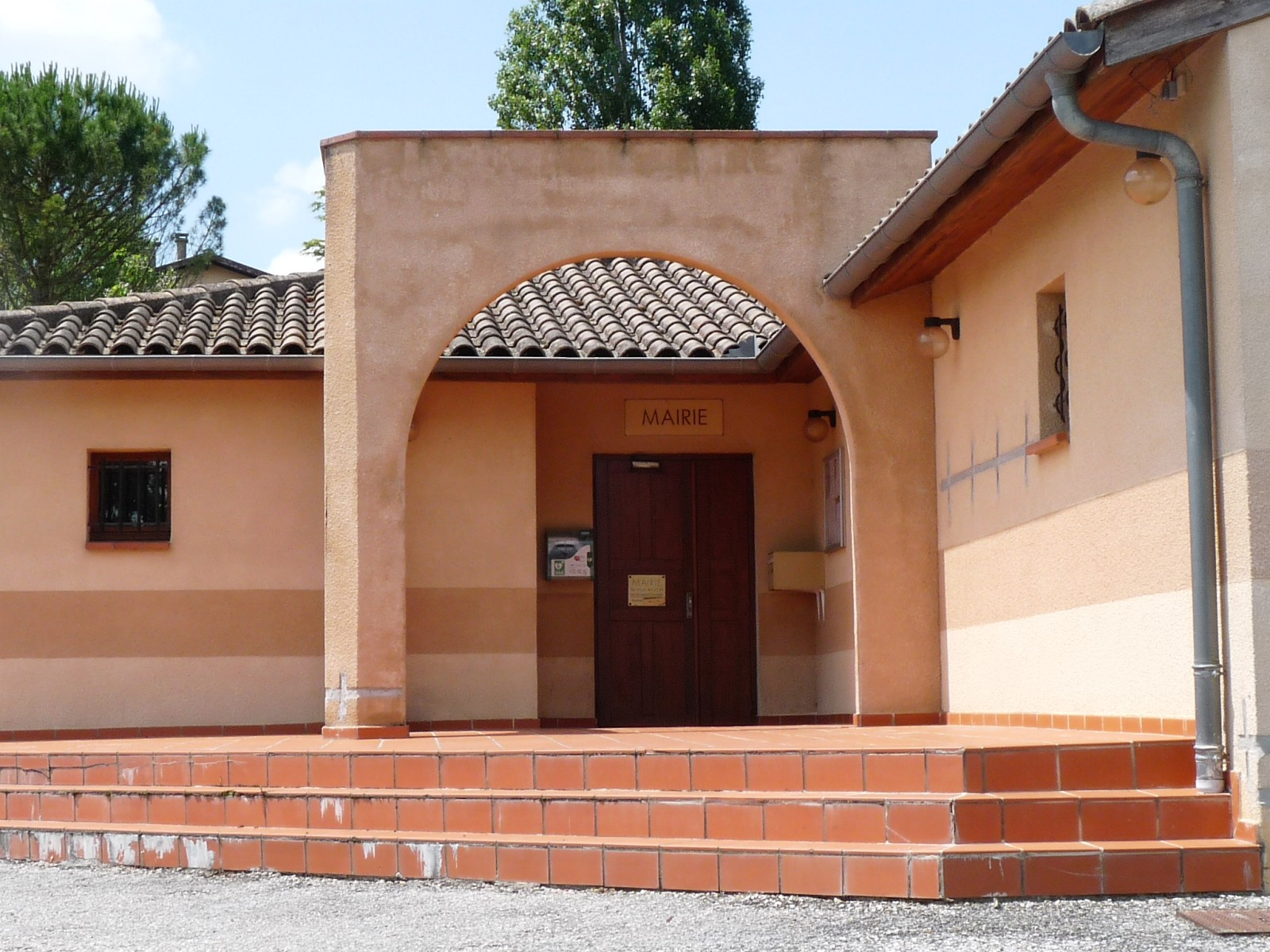
- The town hall in Francarville
- Location of Francarville
- Location within France Location within Occitanie
- Coordinates: 43°35′10″N 1°45′04″E
- Country: France
- Region: Occitania
- Department: Haute-Garonne
- Arrondissement: Toulouse
- Canton: Revel

Government
  - Mayor (2020–2026): Jean-Claude Fignes
- Area^{1}: 7 km^{2} (2.7 sq mi)
- Elevation: 238 m (781 ft)
- Highest elevation: 256 m (840 ft)
- Lowest elevation: 161 m (528 ft)
- Population (2023): 191
  - Density: 27/km^{2} (71/sq mi)
- Time zone: UTC+01:00 (CET)
  - Summer (DST): UTC+02:00 (CEST)
- INSEE/Postal code: 31194 /31460
- ^{1} French Land Register data, which excludes lakes, ponds, glaciers > 1 km^{2} (0.386 sq mi or 247 acres) and river estuaries.

Francarville is a commune in the Haute-Garonne department in southwestern France.

== Population ==
Historical population
Year	Pop.	±% p.a.
1968	100	—
1975	67	−5.56%
1982	103	+6.34%
1990	108	+0.59%
1999	154	+4.02%
2007	171	+1.32%
2012	184	+1.48%
2017	174	−1.11%
2023	191	+1.57%
Source: INSEE

== See also ==
- Communes of the Haute-Garonne department
