= Beauteville =

- Commune
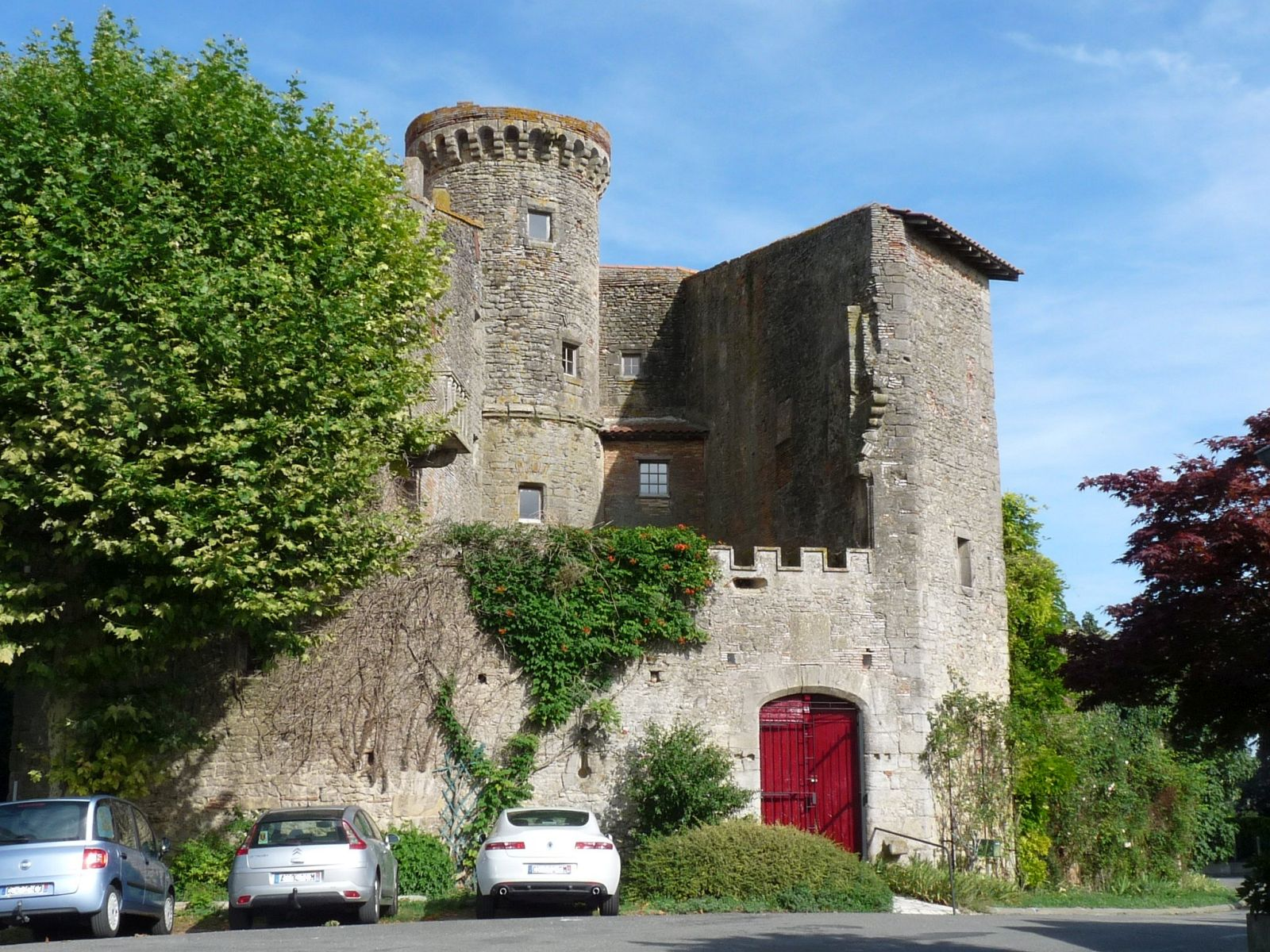
- The chateau in Beauteville

- Coat of arms
- Location of Beauteville
- Location within France Location within Occitanie
- Coordinates: 43°20′54″N 1°44′20″E
- Country: France
- Region: Occitania
- Department: Haute-Garonne
- Arrondissement: Toulouse
- Canton: Revel

Government
  - Mayor (2020–2026): Marius Milhes
- Area^{1}: 4.49 km^{2} (1.73 sq mi)
- Elevation: 250 m (820 ft)
- Highest elevation: 293 m (961 ft)
- Lowest elevation: 181 m (594 ft)
- Population (2023): 193
  - Density: 43.0/km^{2} (111/sq mi)
- Time zone: UTC+01:00 (CET)
  - Summer (DST): UTC+02:00 (CEST)
- INSEE/Postal code: 31054 /31290
- ^{1} French Land Register data, which excludes lakes, ponds, glaciers > 1 km^{2} (0.386 sq mi or 247 acres) and river estuaries.

Beauteville (French pronunciation: [botvil]; Occitan: Bautevila) is a commune in the Haute-Garonne department in southwestern France.

== Population ==
Historical population
Year	Pop.	±% p.a.
1968	121	—
1975	93	−3.69%
1982	81	−1.95%
1990	101	+2.80%
1999	104	+0.33%
2007	151	+4.77%
2012	184	+4.03%
2017	175	−1.00%
2023	193	+1.65%
Source: INSEE

The inhabitants of the commune are known as Beautevillois and Beautevilloises in French.

== See also ==
- Communes of the Haute-Garonne department
