= Aurin, Haute-Garonne =

Aurin
- Commune
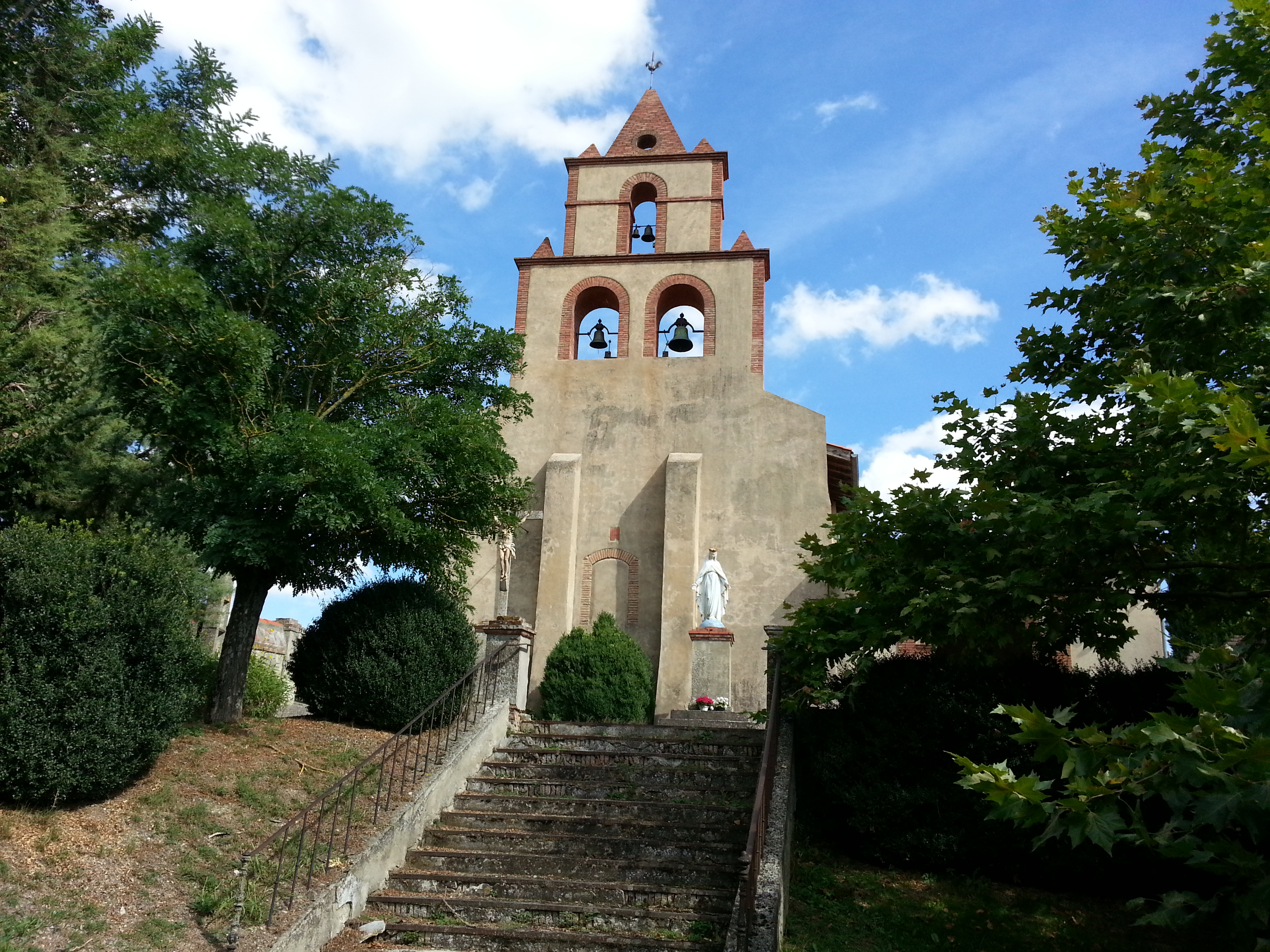
- The church in Aurin
- Location of Aurin
- Location within France Location within Occitanie
- Coordinates: 43°32′15″N 1°41′03″E
- Country: France
- Region: Occitania
- Department: Haute-Garonne
- Arrondissement: Toulouse
- Canton: Revel
- Intercommunality: CC Terres Lauragais

Government
  - Mayor (2020–2026): Sandrine Vercruysse
- Area^{1}: 7.49 km^{2} (2.89 sq mi)
- Elevation: 225 m (738 ft)
- Highest elevation: 265 m (869 ft)
- Lowest elevation: 167 m (548 ft)
- Population (2023): 338
  - Density: 45.1/km^{2} (117/sq mi)
- Time zone: UTC+01:00 (CET)
  - Summer (DST): UTC+02:00 (CEST)
- INSEE/Postal code: 31029 /31570
- ^{1} French Land Register data, which excludes lakes, ponds, glaciers > 1 km^{2} (0.386 sq mi or 247 acres) and river estuaries.

Aurin (French pronunciation: [oʁɛ̃]; Occitan: Aurinh) is a commune in the Haute-Garonne department in southwestern France.

== Population ==
Historical population
Year	Pop.	±% p.a.
1968	168	—
1975	169	+0.08%
1982	177	+0.66%
1990	177	+0.00%
1999	245	+3.68%
2007	265	+0.99%
2012	322	+3.97%
2017	332	+0.61%
2023	338	+0.30%
Source: INSEE

The inhabitants of the commune are known as Aurinois and Aurinoises in French.

== See also ==
- Communes of the Haute-Garonne department
