= Canton of Revel =

Coordinates: 43.46°N 2.00°E

The canton of Revel is an administrative division of the Haute-Garonne department, southern France. Its borders were modified at the French canton reorganisation which came into effect in March 2015. Its seat is in Revel.

It consists of the following communes:

1. Albiac
2. Auriac-sur-Vendinelle
3. Aurin
4. Avignonet-Lauragais
5. Beauteville
6. Beauville
7. Bélesta-en-Lauragais
8. Bourg-Saint-Bernard
9. Le Cabanial
10. Cambiac
11. Caragoudes
12. Caraman
13. Cessales
14. Le Faget
15. Falga
16. Folcarde
17. Francarville
18. Gardouch
19. Juzes
20. Lagarde
21. Lanta
22. Loubens-Lauragais
23. Lux
24. Mascarville
25. Mauremont
26. Maurens
27. Maureville
28. Montclar-Lauragais
29. Montégut-Lauragais
30. Montesquieu-Lauragais
31. Montgaillard-Lauragais
32. Mourvilles-Basses
33. Mourvilles-Hautes
34. Nogaret
35. Prunet
36. Renneville
37. Revel
38. Rieumajou
39. Roumens
40. Saint-Félix-Lauragais
41. Saint-Germier
42. Saint-Julia
43. Saint-Pierre-de-Lages
44. Saint-Rome
45. Saint-Vincent
46. La Salvetat-Lauragais
47. Saussens
48. Ségreville
49. Tarabel
50. Toutens
51. Trébons-sur-la-Grasse
52. Vallègue
53. Vallesvilles
54. Vaudreuille
55. Vaux
56. Vendine
57. Vieillevigne
58. Villefranche-de-Lauragais
59. Villenouvelle
