= Lux, Haute-Garonne =

Lux
- Commune
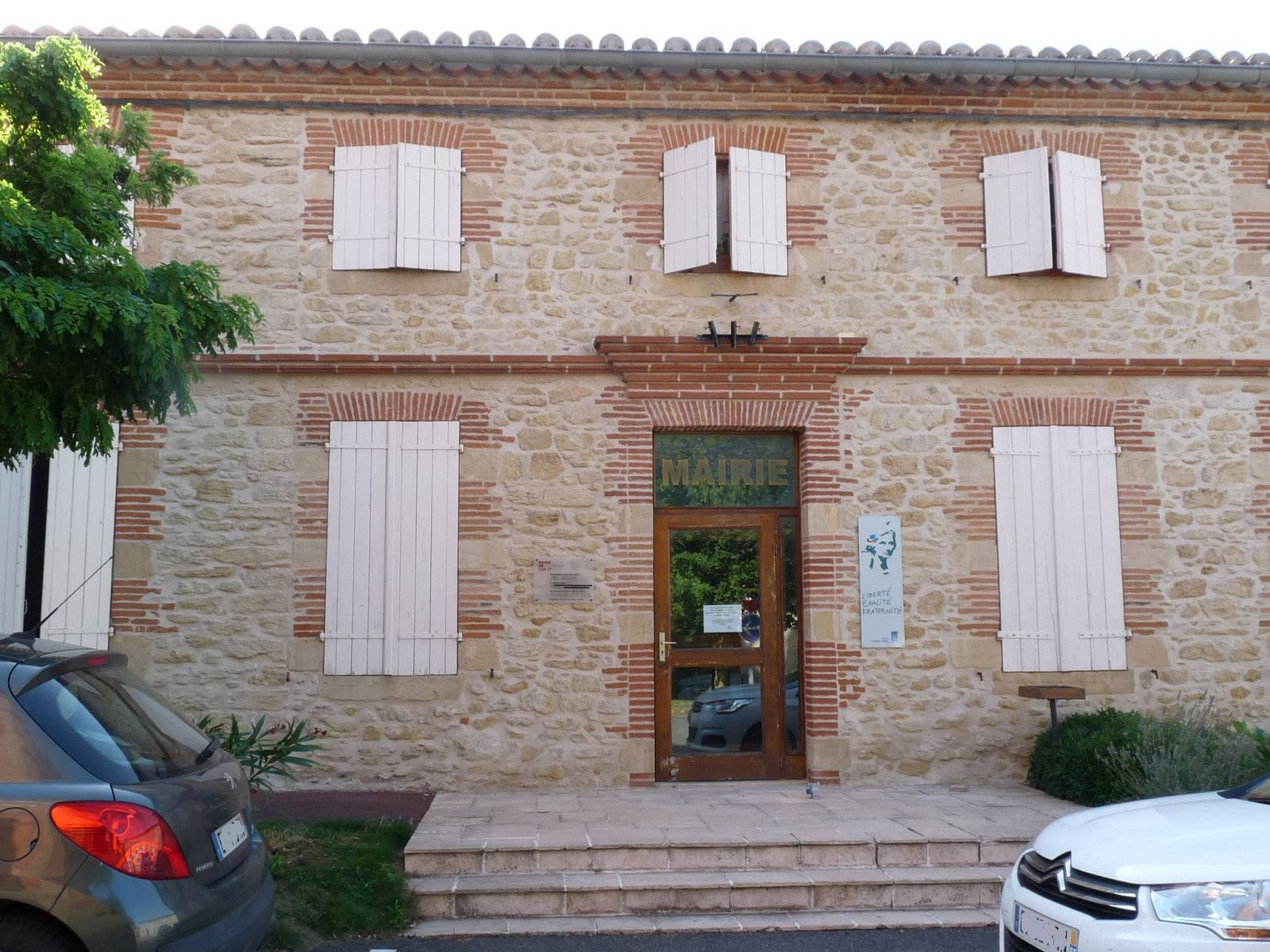
- The town hall in Lux

- Coat of arms
- Location of Lux
- Location within France Location within Occitanie
- Coordinates: 43°26′17″N 1°46′59″E
- Country: France
- Region: Occitania
- Department: Haute-Garonne
- Arrondissement: Toulouse
- Canton: Revel

Government
  - Mayor (2020–2026): Pierre Bressolles
- Area^{1}: 7.59 km^{2} (2.93 sq mi)
- Elevation: 246 m (807 ft)
- Highest elevation: 272 m (892 ft)
- Lowest elevation: 195 m (640 ft)
- Population (2023): 342
  - Density: 45.1/km^{2} (117/sq mi)
- Time zone: UTC+01:00 (CET)
  - Summer (DST): UTC+02:00 (CEST)
- INSEE/Postal code: 31310 /31290
- ^{1} French Land Register data, which excludes lakes, ponds, glaciers > 1 km^{2} (0.386 sq mi or 247 acres) and river estuaries.

Lux is a commune in the Haute-Garonne department in southwestern France.

== Population ==
Historical population
Year	Pop.	±% p.a.
1968	143	—
1975	140	−0.30%
1982	121	−2.06%
1990	134	+1.28%
1999	171	+2.75%
2007	323	+8.27%
2012	355	+1.91%
2017	344	−0.63%
2023	342	−0.10%
Source: INSEE

== See also ==
- Communes of the Haute-Garonne department
