= Saint-Rome =

- Commune
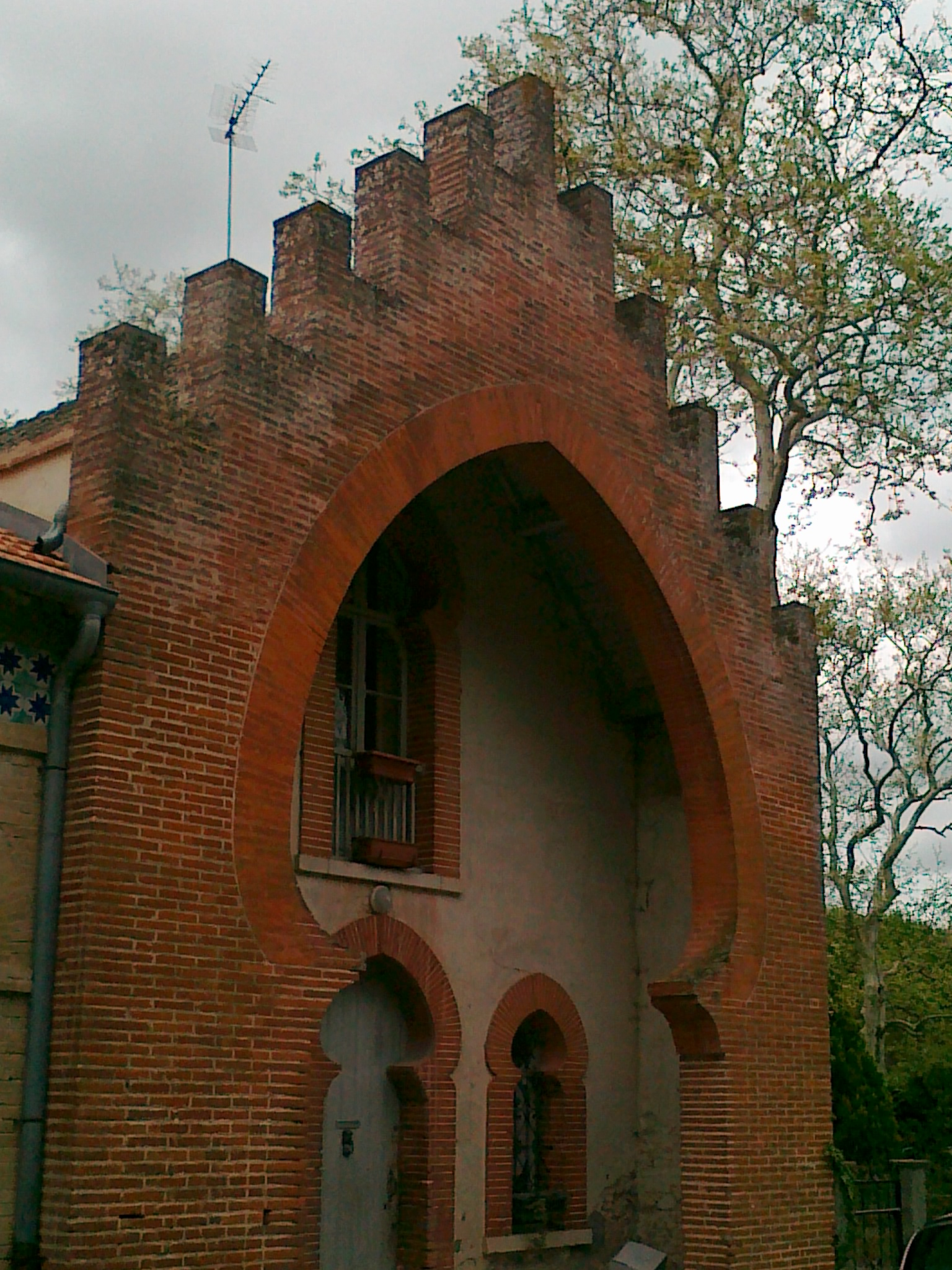
- Typical house
- Location of Saint-Rome
- Location within France Location within Occitanie
- Coordinates: 43°24′56″N 1°40′40″E
- Country: France
- Region: Occitania
- Department: Haute-Garonne
- Arrondissement: Toulouse
- Canton: Revel

Government
  - Mayor (2020–2026): Geoffroy de La Panouse
- Area^{1}: 3.63 km^{2} (1.40 sq mi)
- Elevation: 170 m (560 ft)
- Highest elevation: 174 m (571 ft)
- Lowest elevation: 163 m (535 ft)
- Population (2023): 57
  - Density: 16/km^{2} (41/sq mi)
- Time zone: UTC+01:00 (CET)
  - Summer (DST): UTC+02:00 (CEST)
- INSEE/Postal code: 31514 /31290
- ^{1} French Land Register data, which excludes lakes, ponds, glaciers > 1 km^{2} (0.386 sq mi or 247 acres) and river estuaries.

Saint-Rome (French pronunciation: [sɛ̃ ʁɔm]; Languedocien: Sent Roma) is a commune in the Haute-Garonne department in southwestern France.

== Population ==
Historical population
Year	Pop.	±% p.a.
1968	108	—
1975	81	−4.03%
1982	93	+1.99%
1990	74	−2.82%
1999	68	−0.94%
2007	60	−1.55%
2012	55	−1.73%
2017	51	−1.50%
2023	57	+1.87%
Source: INSEE

== See also ==
- Communes of the Haute-Garonne department
