= Vendine =

- Commune
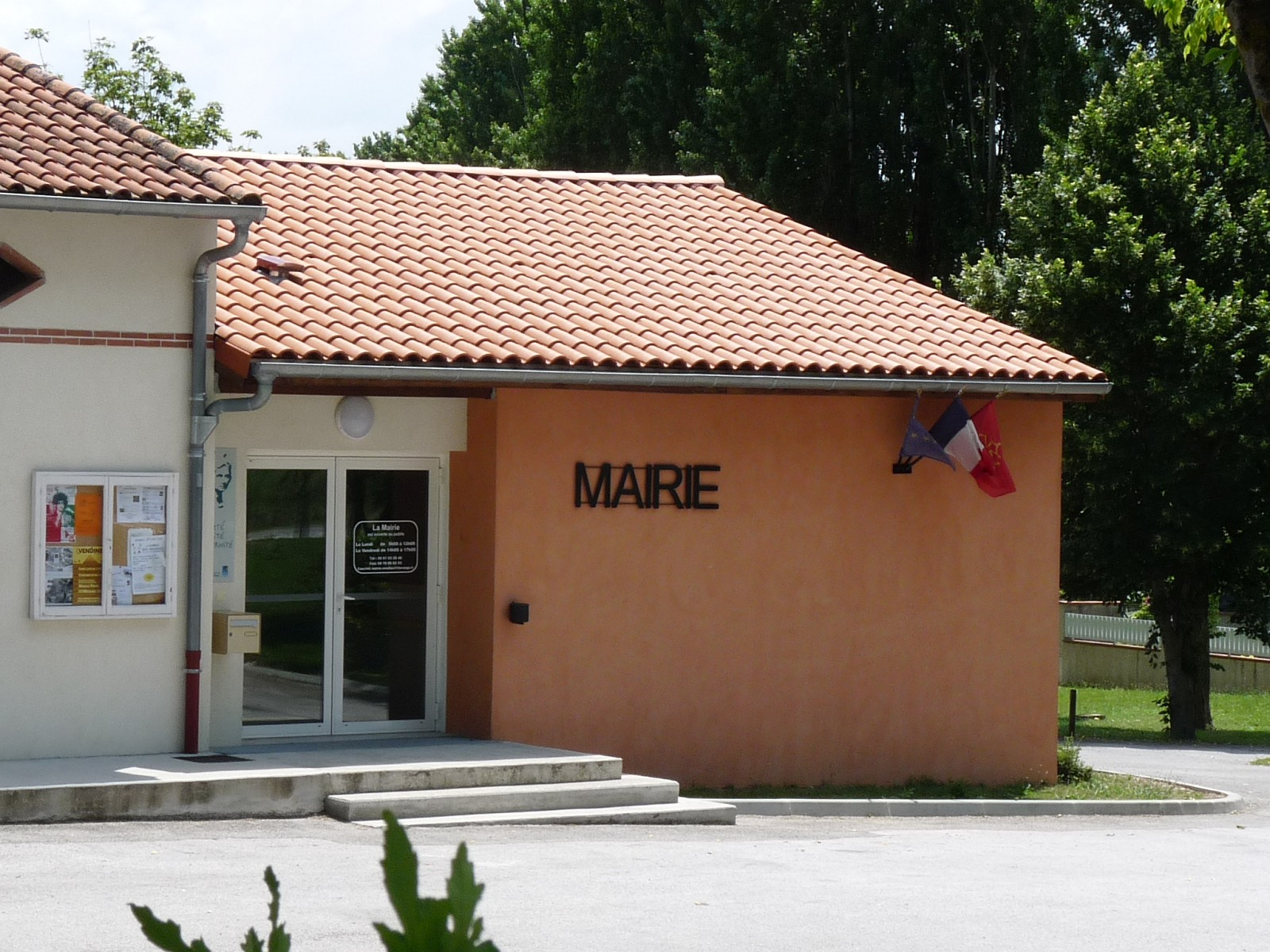
- The town hall in Vendine
- Location of Vendine
- Location within France Location within Occitanie
- Coordinates: 43°35′26″N 1°46′05″E
- Country: France
- Region: Occitania
- Department: Haute-Garonne
- Arrondissement: Toulouse
- Canton: Revel

Government
  - Mayor (2022–2026): Benoît Serre
- Area^{1}: 2.87 km^{2} (1.11 sq mi)
- Elevation: 178 m (584 ft)
- Highest elevation: 194 m (636 ft)
- Lowest elevation: 161 m (528 ft)
- Population (2023): 269
  - Density: 93.7/km^{2} (243/sq mi)
- Time zone: UTC+01:00 (CET)
  - Summer (DST): UTC+02:00 (CEST)
- INSEE/Postal code: 31571 /31460
- ^{1} French Land Register data, which excludes lakes, ponds, glaciers > 1 km^{2} (0.386 sq mi or 247 acres) and river estuaries.

Vendine (Occitan: Vendina) is a commune in the Haute-Garonne department in southwestern France.

== Population ==
Historical population
| Year | Pop. | ±% p.a. |
|---|---|---|
| 1968 | 110 | — |
| 1975 | 111 | +0.13% |
| 1982 | 135 | +2.84% |
| 1990 | 142 | +0.63% |
| 1999 | 169 | +1.95% |
| 2007 | 233 | +4.10% |
| 2012 | 263 | +2.45% |
| 2017 | 284 | +1.55% |
| 2023 | 269 | −0.90% |
Source: INSEE

== See also ==
- Communes of the Haute-Garonne department
