= Mauremont =

- Commune
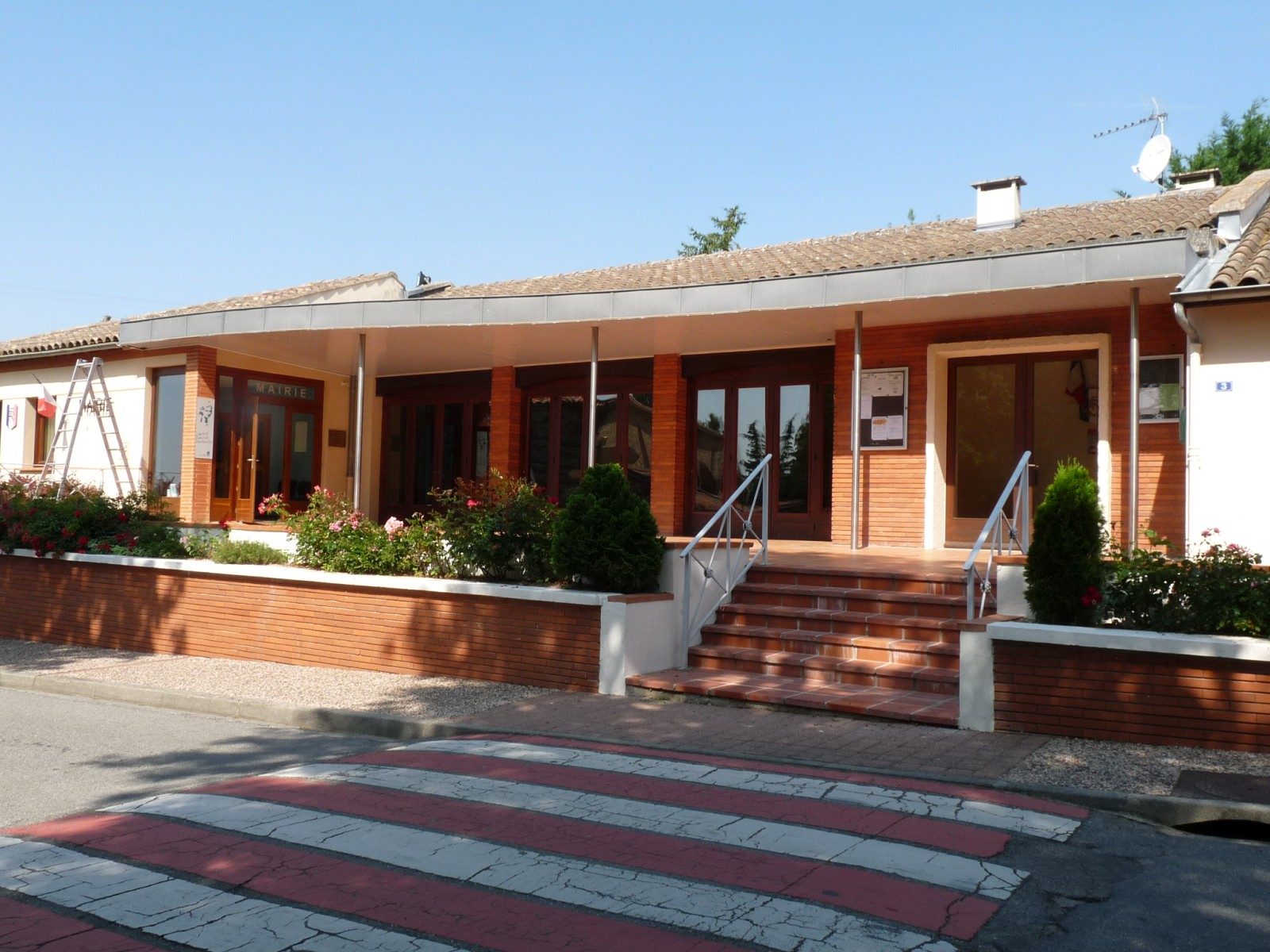
- The town hall in Mauremont

- Coat of arms
- Location of Mauremont
- Location within France Location within Occitanie
- Coordinates: 43°27′30″N 1°40′48″E
- Country: France
- Region: Occitania
- Department: Haute-Garonne
- Arrondissement: Toulouse
- Canton: Revel

Government
  - Mayor (2020–2026): Catherine Latche
- Area^{1}: 5.63 km^{2} (2.17 sq mi)
- Elevation: 220 m (720 ft)
- Highest elevation: 269 m (883 ft)
- Lowest elevation: 184 m (604 ft)
- Population (2023): 349
  - Density: 62.0/km^{2} (161/sq mi)
- Time zone: UTC+01:00 (CET)
  - Summer (DST): UTC+02:00 (CEST)
- INSEE/Postal code: 31328 /31290
- ^{1} French Land Register data, which excludes lakes, ponds, glaciers > 1 km^{2} (0.386 sq mi or 247 acres) and river estuaries.

Mauremont (French pronunciation: [moʁmɔ̃]; Occitan: Mauremont) is a commune in the Haute-Garonne department in southwestern France.

== Population ==
Historical population
Year	Pop.	±% p.a.
1968	135	—
1975	134	−0.11%
1982	151	+1.72%
1990	178	+2.08%
1999	223	+2.54%
2007	299	+3.73%
2012	323	+1.56%
2017	323	+0.00%
2023	349	+1.30%
Source: INSEE

== See also ==
- Communes of the Haute-Garonne department
