= Tarabel =

- Commune
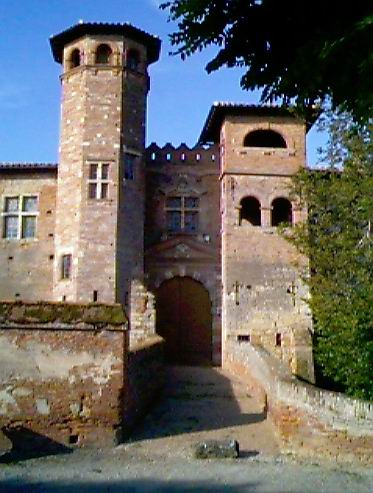
- Chateau

- Coat of arms
- Location of Tarabel
- Location within France Location within Occitanie
- Coordinates: 43°30′45″N 1°40′39″E
- Country: France
- Region: Occitania
- Department: Haute-Garonne
- Arrondissement: Toulouse
- Canton: Revel

Government
  - Mayor (2020–2026): Sylvie Vivies
- Area^{1}: 7.42 km^{2} (2.86 sq mi)
- Elevation: 238 m (781 ft)
- Highest elevation: 252 m (827 ft)
- Lowest elevation: 168 m (551 ft)
- Population (2023): 601
  - Density: 81.0/km^{2} (210/sq mi)
- Time zone: UTC+01:00 (CET)
  - Summer (DST): UTC+02:00 (CEST)
- INSEE/Postal code: 31551 /31570
- ^{1} French Land Register data, which excludes lakes, ponds, glaciers > 1 km^{2} (0.386 sq mi or 247 acres) and river estuaries.

Tarabel (French pronunciation: [taʁabɛl]; Occitan: Tarabèl) is a commune in the Haute-Garonne department in southwestern France. It has a primary school and its iconic brick castle situated near the church. The town's wealth a prestige reached its apogee in the early 16th century. It also played a minor role in the Albigensian Crusades.

== Population ==
Historical population
Year	Pop.	±% p.a.
1968	218	—
1975	193	−1.73%
1982	193	+0.00%
1990	266	+4.09%
1999	373	+3.83%
2007	334	−1.37%
2012	363	+1.68%
2017	460	+4.85%
2023	601	+4.56%
Source: INSEE

== See also ==
- Communes of the Haute-Garonne department
