= Saussens =

- Commune
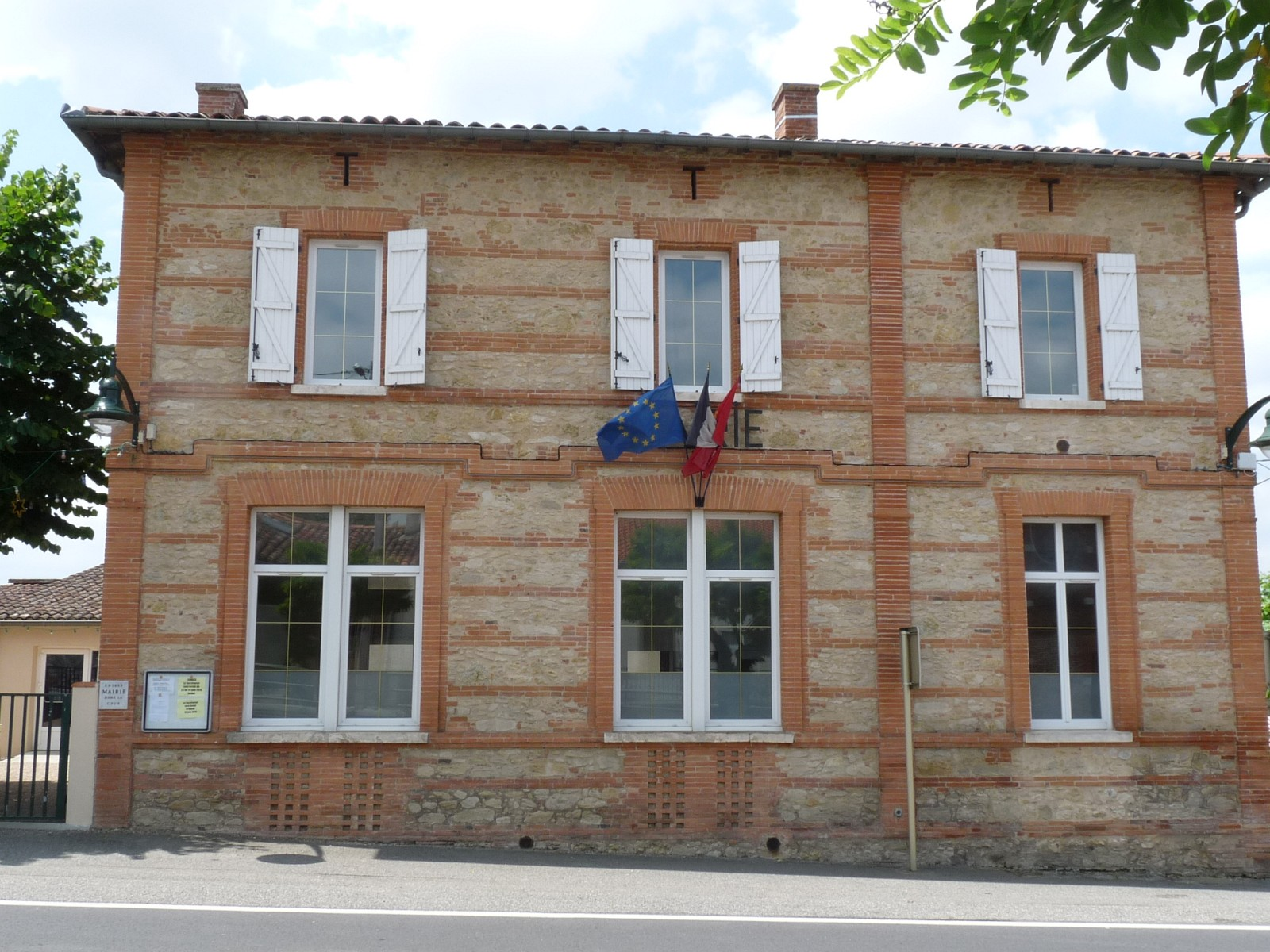
- The town hall in Saussens
- Location of Saussens
- Location within France Location within Occitanie
- Coordinates: 43°35′19″N 1°43′22″E
- Country: France
- Region: Occitania
- Department: Haute-Garonne
- Arrondissement: Toulouse
- Canton: Revel

Government
  - Mayor (2020–2026): Maryse Mouysset
- Area^{1}: 3.02 km^{2} (1.17 sq mi)
- Elevation: 226 m (741 ft)
- Highest elevation: 254 m (833 ft)
- Lowest elevation: 160 m (520 ft)
- Population (2023): 217
  - Density: 71.9/km^{2} (186/sq mi)
- Time zone: UTC+01:00 (CET)
  - Summer (DST): UTC+02:00 (CEST)
- INSEE/Postal code: 31534 /31460
- ^{1} French Land Register data, which excludes lakes, ponds, glaciers > 1 km^{2} (0.386 sq mi or 247 acres) and river estuaries.

Saussens is a commune in the Haute-Garonne department in southwestern France.

== Population ==
Historical population
Year	Pop.	±% p.a.
1968	111	—
1975	121	+1.24%
1982	138	+1.90%
1990	141	+0.27%
1999	144	+0.23%
2007	256	+7.46%
2012	192	−5.59%
2017	209	+1.71%
2023	217	+0.63%
Source: INSEE

== See also ==
- Communes of the Haute-Garonne department
