= Montesquieu-Lauragais =

- Commune
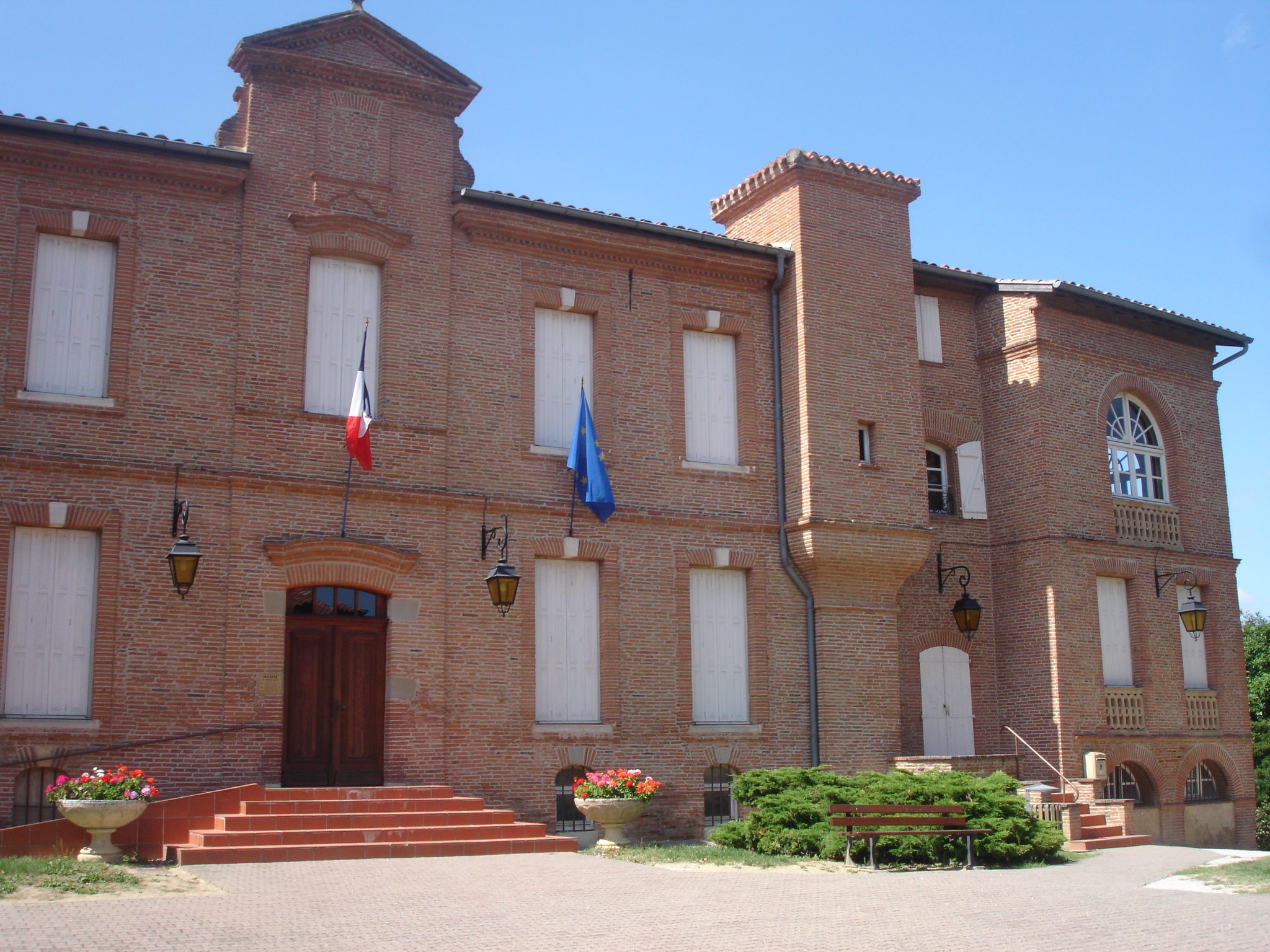
- Town hall

- Coat of arms
- Location of Montesquieu-Lauragais
- Location within France Location within Occitanie
- Coordinates: 43°25′02″N 1°37′46″E
- Country: France
- Region: Occitania
- Department: Haute-Garonne
- Arrondissement: Toulouse
- Canton: Revel

Government
  - Mayor (2021–2026): Abdelrani Mahcer
- Area^{1}: 24.75 km^{2} (9.56 sq mi)
- Highest elevation: 274 m (899 ft)
- Lowest elevation: 158 m (518 ft)
- Population (2023): 1,032
  - Density: 41.70/km^{2} (108.0/sq mi)
- Time zone: UTC+01:00 (CET)
  - Summer (DST): UTC+02:00 (CEST)
- INSEE/Postal code: 31374 /31450
- ^{1} French Land Register data, which excludes lakes, ponds, glaciers > 1 km^{2} (0.386 sq mi or 247 acres) and river estuaries.

Montesquieu-Lauragais (French pronunciation: [mɔ̃tɛskjø loʁaɡɛ]; Occitan: Montesquiu de Lauragués) is a commune in the Haute-Garonne department in southwestern France.

== Population ==
Historical population
Year	Pop.	±% p.a.
1968	646	—
1975	564	−1.92%
1982	654	+2.14%
1990	742	+1.59%
1999	846	+1.47%
2007	898	+0.75%
2012	922	+0.53%
2017	977	+1.17%
2023	1,032	+0.92%
Source: INSEE

== See also ==
- Communes of the Haute-Garonne department
