= Rieumajou =

- Commune
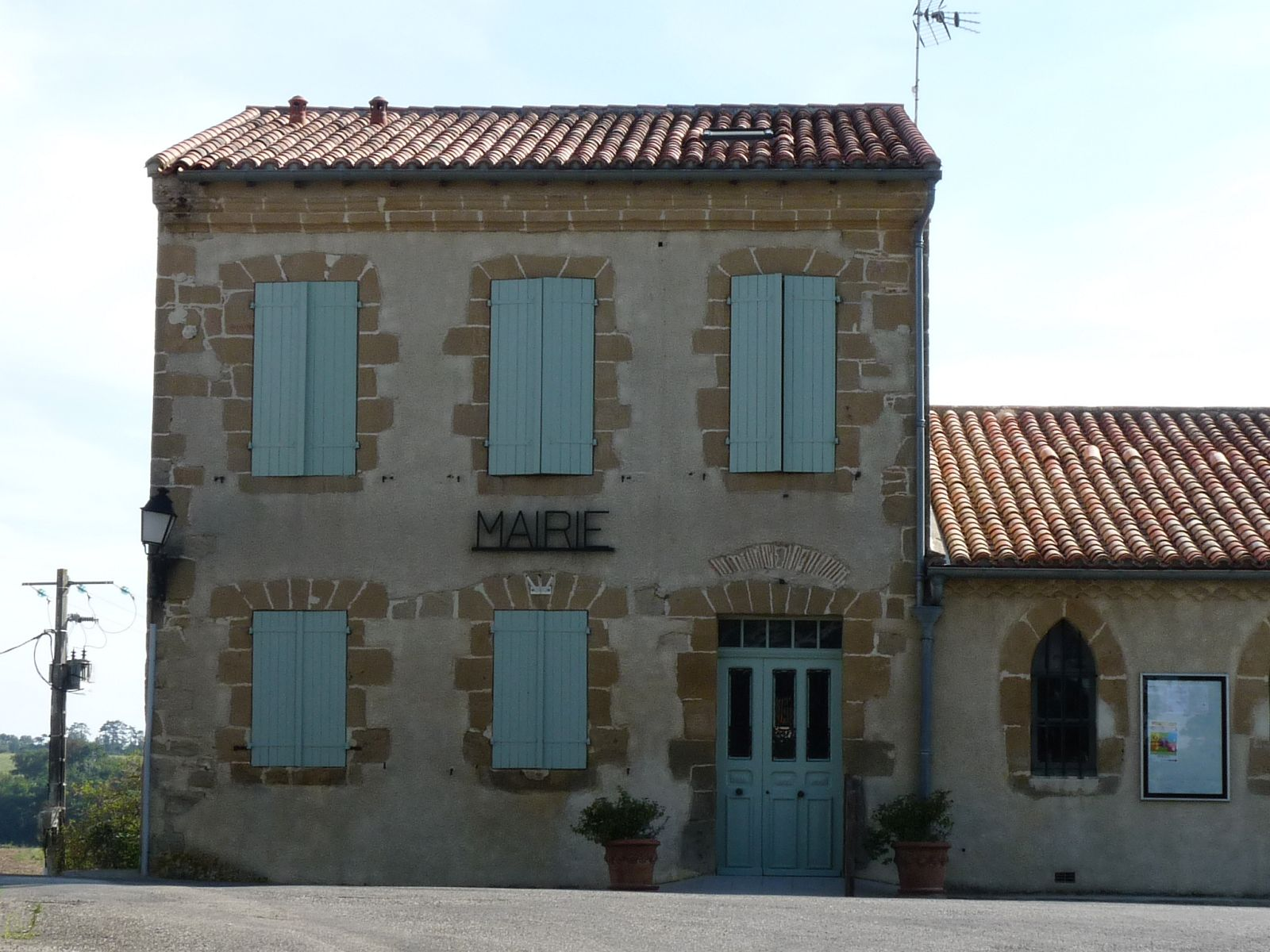
- The town hall in Rieumajou

- Coat of arms
- Location of Rieumajou
- Location within France Location within Occitanie
- Coordinates: 43°24′58″N 1°47′28″E
- Country: France
- Region: Occitania
- Department: Haute-Garonne
- Arrondissement: Toulouse
- Canton: Revel

Government
  - Mayor (2022–2026): Valéry Barrau
- Area^{1}: 3.77 km^{2} (1.46 sq mi)
- Elevation: 245 m (804 ft)
- Highest elevation: 282 m (925 ft)
- Lowest elevation: 205 m (673 ft)
- Population (2023): 134
  - Density: 35.5/km^{2} (92.1/sq mi)
- Time zone: UTC+01:00 (CET)
  - Summer (DST): UTC+02:00 (CEST)
- INSEE/Postal code: 31453 /31290
- ^{1} French Land Register data, which excludes lakes, ponds, glaciers > 1 km^{2} (0.386 sq mi or 247 acres) and river estuaries.

Rieumajou (French pronunciation: [ʁjømaʒu]; Occitan: Riumajor) is a commune in the Haute-Garonne department in southwestern France.

== Population ==
Historical population
Year	Pop.	±% p.a.
1968	67	—
1975	63	−0.88%
1982	54	−2.18%
1990	79	+4.87%
1999	87	+1.08%
2007	123	+4.42%
2012	141	+2.77%
2017	136	−0.72%
2023	134	−0.25%
Source: INSEE

== See also ==
- Communes of the Haute-Garonne department
