= Vallesvilles =

- Commune
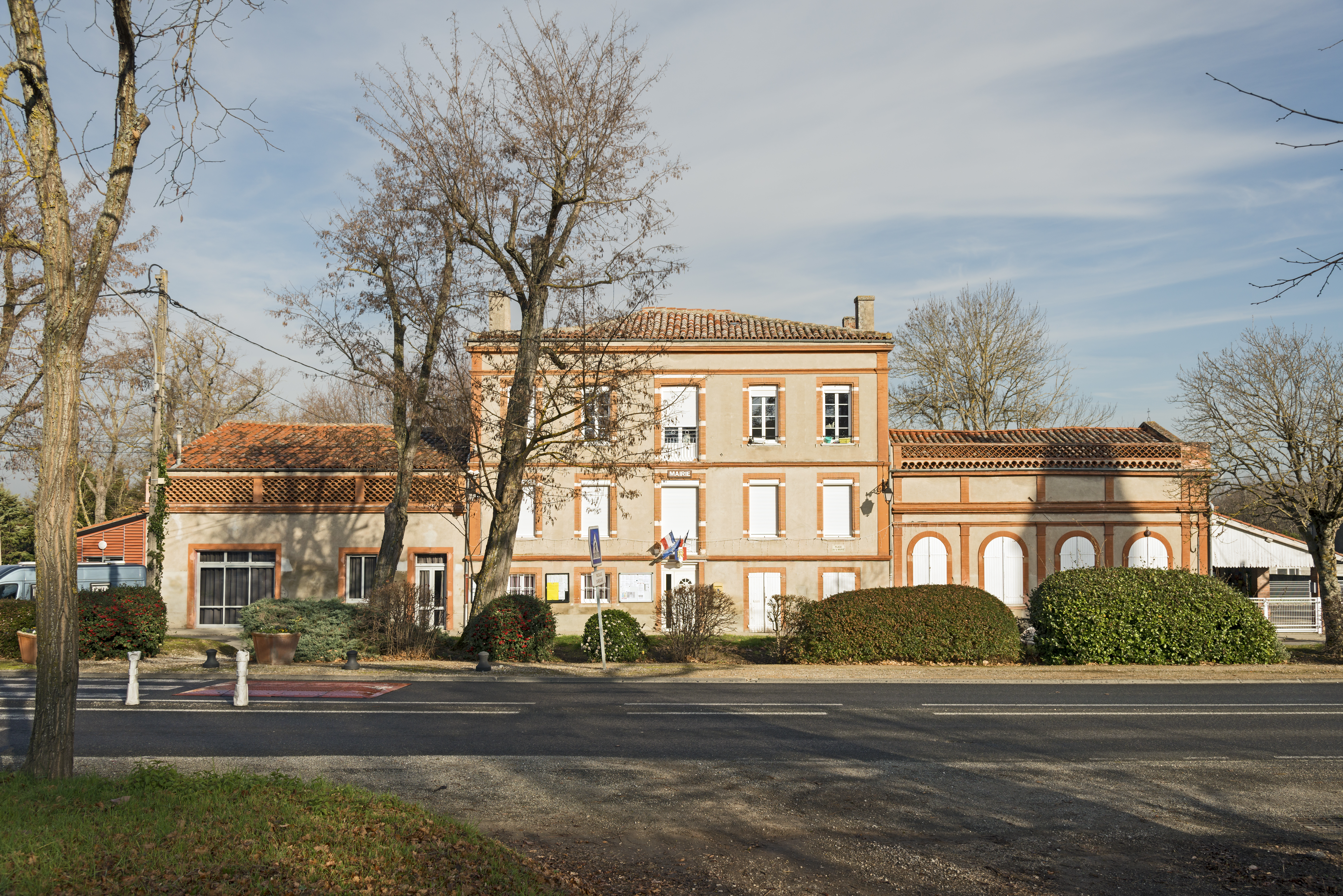
- The town hall in Vallesvilles

- Coat of arms
- Location of Vallesvilles
- Location within France Location within Occitanie
- Coordinates: 43°35′33″N 1°38′49″E
- Country: France
- Region: Occitania
- Department: Haute-Garonne
- Arrondissement: Toulouse
- Canton: Revel

Government
  - Mayor (2020–2026): Christian Izard
- Area^{1}: 8.16 km^{2} (3.15 sq mi)
- Elevation: 245 m (804 ft)
- Highest elevation: 254 m (833 ft)
- Lowest elevation: 174 m (571 ft)
- Population (2023): 462
  - Density: 56.6/km^{2} (147/sq mi)
- Time zone: UTC+01:00 (CET)
  - Summer (DST): UTC+02:00 (CEST)
- INSEE/Postal code: 31567 /31570
- ^{1} French Land Register data, which excludes lakes, ponds, glaciers > 1 km^{2} (0.386 sq mi or 247 acres) and river estuaries.

Vallesvilles is a commune in the Haute-Garonne department in southwestern France.

== Population ==
Historical population
| Year | Pop. | ±% p.a. |
|---|---|---|
| 1968 | 194 | — |
| 1975 | 205 | +0.79% |
| 1982 | 215 | +0.68% |
| 1990 | 332 | +5.58% |
| 1999 | 291 | −1.45% |
| 2007 | 342 | +2.04% |
| 2012 | 377 | +1.97% |
| 2017 | 418 | +2.09% |
| 2023 | 462 | +1.68% |
Source: INSEE

== Monuments ==
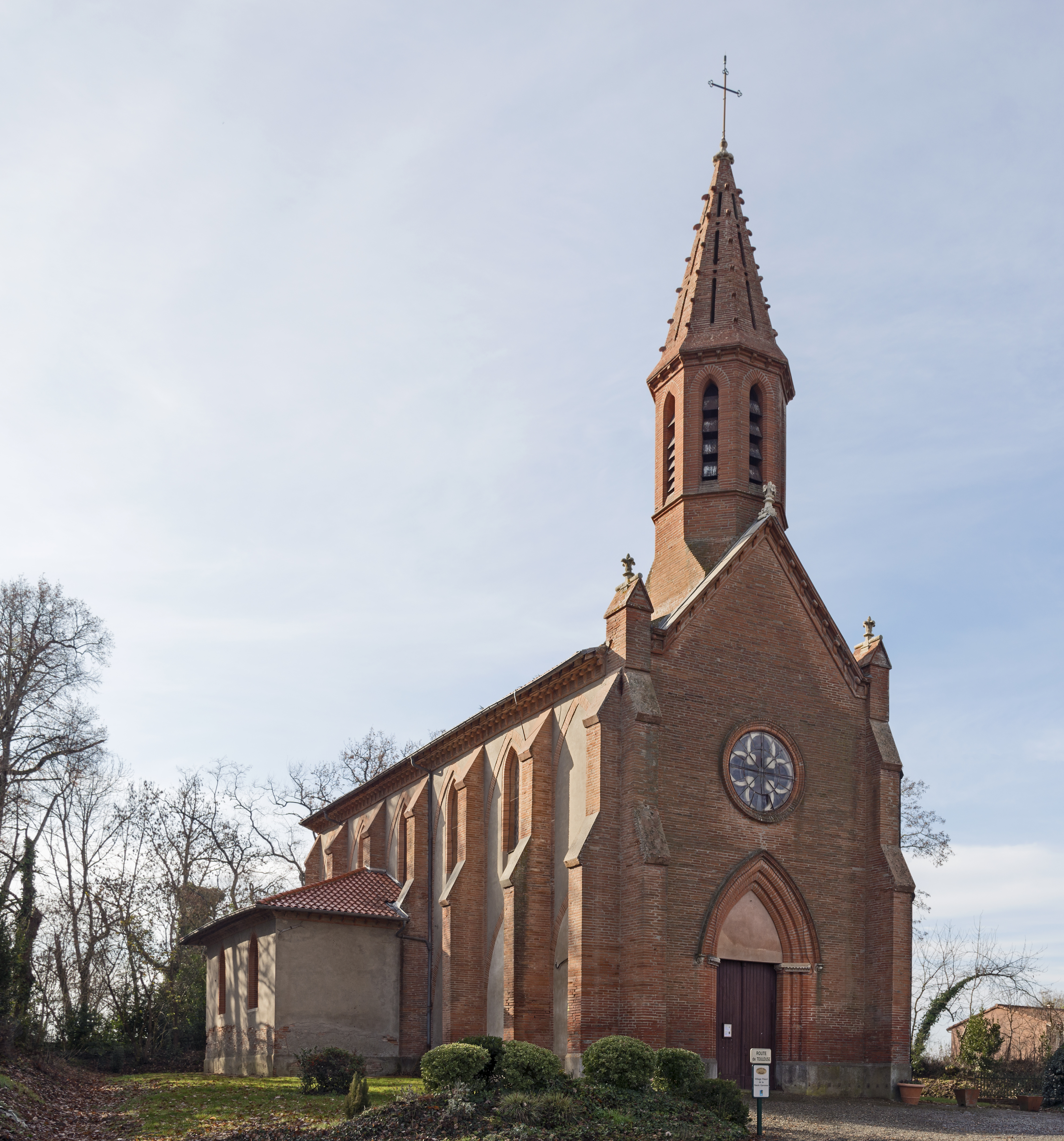
St. Martin Church

== See also ==
- Communes of the Haute-Garonne department
