= Ségreville =

- Commune
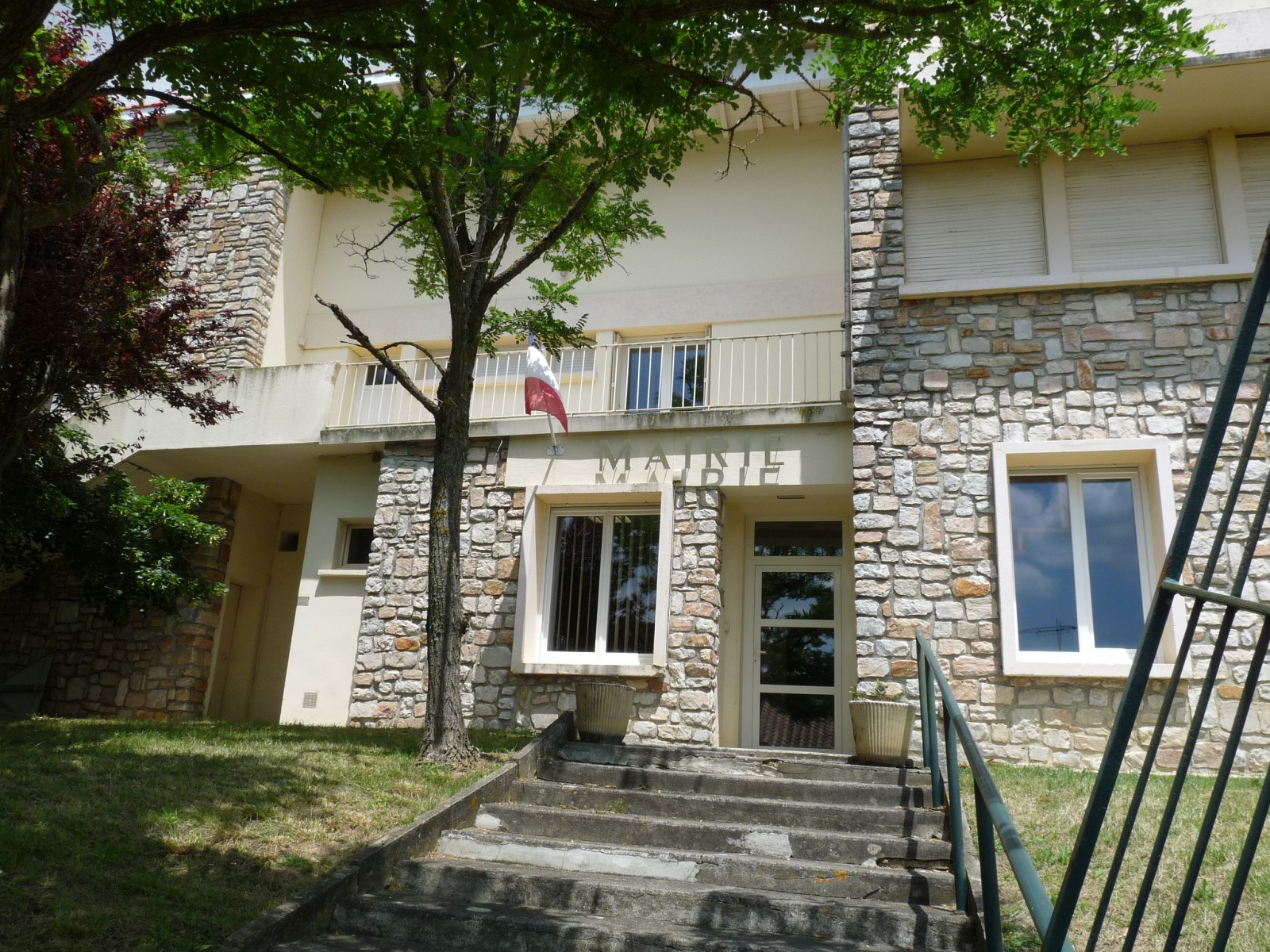
- The town hall
- Location of Ségreville
- Location within France Location within Occitanie
- Coordinates: 43°29′27″N 1°44′36″E
- Country: France
- Region: Occitania
- Department: Haute-Garonne
- Arrondissement: Toulouse
- Canton: Revel

Government
  - Mayor (2020–2026): Didier Castagné
- Area^{1}: 4.98 km^{2} (1.92 sq mi)
- Elevation: 214 m (702 ft)
- Highest elevation: 272 m (892 ft)
- Lowest elevation: 180 m (590 ft)
- Population (2023): 329
  - Density: 66.1/km^{2} (171/sq mi)
- Time zone: UTC+01:00 (CET)
  - Summer (DST): UTC+02:00 (CEST)
- INSEE/Postal code: 31540 /31460
- ^{1} French Land Register data, which excludes lakes, ponds, glaciers > 1 km^{2} (0.386 sq mi or 247 acres) and river estuaries.

Ségreville (French pronunciation: [seɡʁəvil]; Occitan: Segrevila) is a commune in the Haute-Garonne department in southwestern France.

== Geography ==
=== Climate ===
Ségreville has an oceanic climate (Köppen climate classification Cfb) closely bordering on a humid subtropical climate (Cfa). The average annual temperature in Ségreville is 13.4 °C (56.1 °F). The average annual rainfall is 747.6 mm (29.43 in) with May as the wettest month. The temperatures are highest on average in August, at around 21.9 °C (71.4 °F), and lowest in January, at around 5.6 °C (42.1 °F). The highest temperature ever recorded in Ségreville was 41.8 °C (107.2 °F) on 12 August 2003; the coldest temperature ever recorded was −20.2 °C (−4.4 °F) on 16 January 1985.

Climate data for Ségreville (1991−2020 normals, extremes 1961−present)
Month	Jan	Feb	Mar	Apr	May	Jun	Jul	Aug	Sep	Oct	Nov	Dec	Year
Record high °C (°F)	19.0 (66.2)	24.2 (75.6)	26.2 (79.2)	28.8 (83.8)	33.0 (91.4)	39.5 (103.1)	39.2 (102.6)	41.8 (107.2)	35.0 (95.0)	30.8 (87.4)	35.6 (96.1)	19.6 (67.3)	41.8 (107.2)
Mean daily maximum °C (°F)	9.4 (48.9)	11.2 (52.2)	15.0 (59.0)	17.7 (63.9)	21.5 (70.7)	25.5 (77.9)	28.2 (82.8)	28.6 (83.5)	24.6 (76.3)	19.6 (67.3)	13.3 (55.9)	10.2 (50.4)	18.7 (65.7)
Daily mean °C (°F)	5.6 (42.1)	6.5 (43.7)	9.6 (49.3)	12.0 (53.6)	15.7 (60.3)	19.4 (66.9)	21.6 (70.9)	21.9 (71.4)	18.4 (65.1)	14.6 (58.3)	9.3 (48.7)	6.4 (43.5)	13.4 (56.1)
Mean daily minimum °C (°F)	1.8 (35.2)	1.9 (35.4)	4.2 (39.6)	6.3 (43.3)	9.9 (49.8)	13.3 (55.9)	15.1 (59.2)	15.2 (59.4)	12.2 (54.0)	9.6 (49.3)	5.2 (41.4)	2.7 (36.9)	8.1 (46.6)
Record low °C (°F)	−20.2 (−4.4)	−15.0 (5.0)	−10.0 (14.0)	−3.0 (26.6)	0.2 (32.4)	3.6 (38.5)	7.2 (45.0)	6.0 (42.8)	1.4 (34.5)	−3.4 (25.9)	−8.6 (16.5)	−13.3 (8.1)	−20.2 (−4.4)
Average precipitation mm (inches)	68.5 (2.70)	48.1 (1.89)	57.1 (2.25)	75.7 (2.98)	81.8 (3.22)	67.0 (2.64)	46.6 (1.83)	48.0 (1.89)	59.0 (2.32)	61.3 (2.41)	72.4 (2.85)	62.1 (2.44)	747.6 (29.43)
Average precipitation days (≥ 1.0 mm)	10.6	9.0	9.1	10.3	10.0	7.7	6.3	6.2	7.3	8.5	10.8	10.2	105.9
Source: Météo-France

== Population ==
Historical population
Year	Pop.	±% p.a.
1968	96	—
1975	89	−1.08%
1982	87	−0.32%
1990	101	+1.88%
1999	143	+3.94%
2007	183	+3.13%
2012	230	+4.68%
2017	297	+5.25%
2023	329	+1.72%
Source: INSEE

== See also ==
- Communes of the Haute-Garonne department
