= Mourvilles-Basses =

- Commune
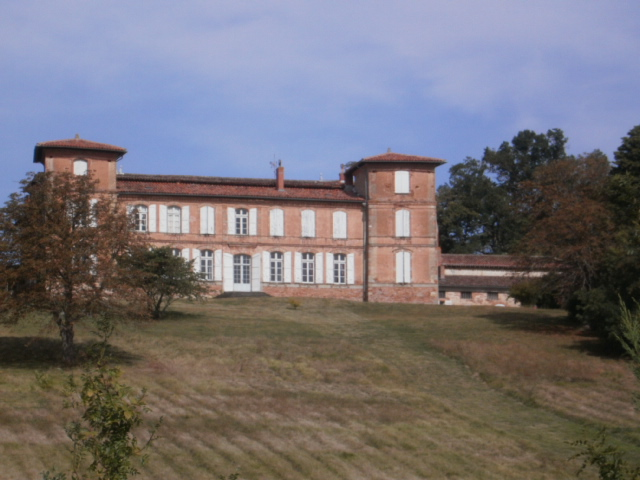
- The chateau in Mourvilles-Basses

- Coat of arms
- Location of Mourvilles-Basses
- Location within France Location within Occitanie
- Coordinates: 43°29′11″N 1°42′14″E
- Country: France
- Region: Occitania
- Department: Haute-Garonne
- Arrondissement: Toulouse
- Canton: Revel

Government
  - Mayor (2020–2026): Axel de Laplagnolle
- Area^{1}: 4.58 km^{2} (1.77 sq mi)
- Elevation: 220 m (720 ft)
- Highest elevation: 273 m (896 ft)
- Lowest elevation: 187 m (614 ft)
- Population (2023): 79
  - Density: 17/km^{2} (45/sq mi)
- Time zone: UTC+01:00 (CET)
  - Summer (DST): UTC+02:00 (CEST)
- INSEE/Postal code: 31392 /31460
- ^{1} French Land Register data, which excludes lakes, ponds, glaciers > 1 km^{2} (0.386 sq mi or 247 acres) and river estuaries.

Mourvilles-Basses (French pronunciation: [muʁvil bas]; Occitan: Morvilas Bassas) is a commune in the Haute-Garonne department of southwestern France.

== Population ==
Historical population
Year	Pop.	±% p.a.
1968	80	—
1975	50	−6.49%
1982	58	+2.14%
1990	57	−0.22%
1999	60	+0.57%
2007	56	−0.86%
2012	74	+5.73%
2017	75	+0.27%
2023	79	+0.87%
Source: INSEE

== See also ==
- Communes of the Haute-Garonne department
