= Vaux, Haute-Garonne =

Vaux
- Commune
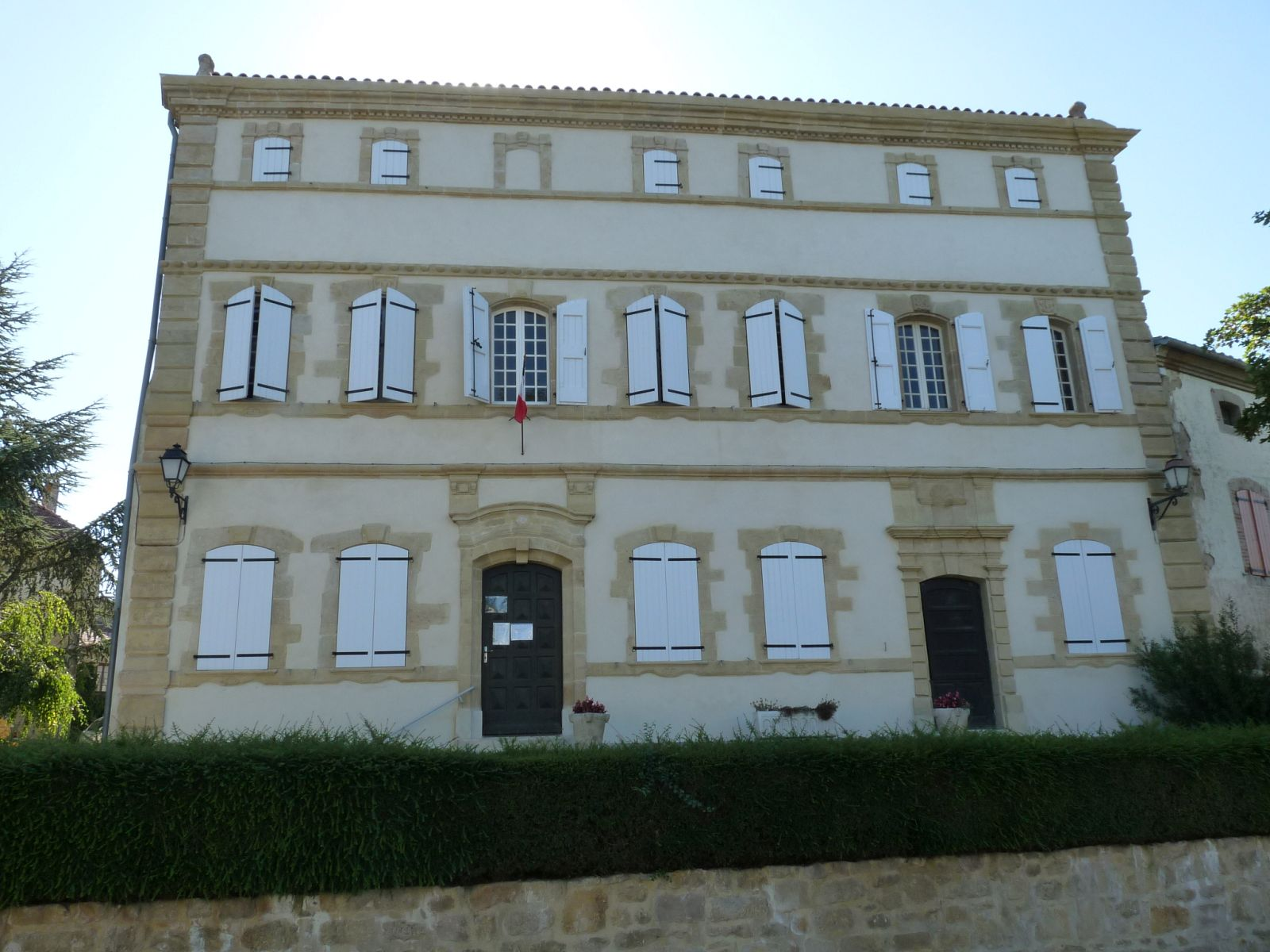
- The town hall in Vaux

- Coat of arms
- Location of Vaux
- Location within France Location within Occitanie
- Coordinates: 43°27′23″N 1°50′16″E
- Country: France
- Region: Occitania
- Department: Haute-Garonne
- Arrondissement: Toulouse
- Canton: Revel
- Intercommunality: CC aux sources du Canal du Midi

Government
  - Mayor (2020–2026): Claude Morin
- Area^{1}: 10.41 km^{2} (4.02 sq mi)
- Elevation: 292 m (958 ft)
- Highest elevation: 291 m (955 ft)
- Lowest elevation: 209 m (686 ft)
- Population (2023): 310
  - Density: 30/km^{2} (77/sq mi)
- Time zone: UTC+01:00 (CET)
  - Summer (DST): UTC+02:00 (CEST)
- INSEE/Postal code: 31570 /31540
- ^{1} French Land Register data, which excludes lakes, ponds, glaciers > 1 km^{2} (0.386 sq mi or 247 acres) and river estuaries.

Vaux (French pronunciation: [vo]; Occitan: Le Bauç) is a commune in the Haute-Garonne department in southwestern France.

== Population ==
Historical population
Year	Pop.	±% p.a.
1968	208	—
1975	209	+0.07%
1982	210	+0.07%
1990	185	−1.57%
1999	223	+2.10%
2007	257	+1.79%
2012	271	+1.07%
2017	295	+1.71%
2023	310	+0.83%
Source: INSEE

== See also ==
- Communes of the Haute-Garonne department
