= Mourvilles-Hautes =

- Commune
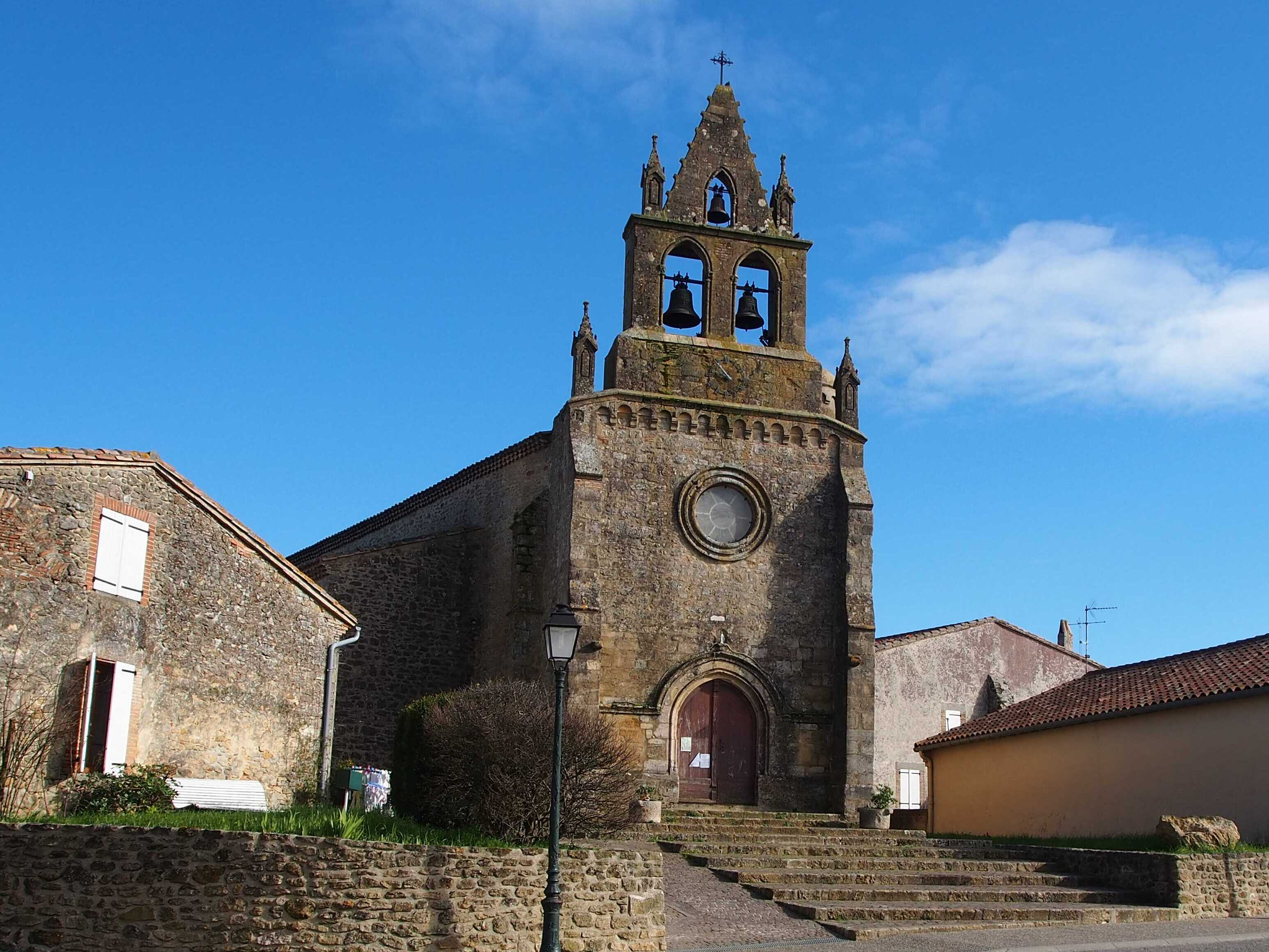
- The church in Mourvilles-Hautes

- Coat of arms
- Location of Mourvilles-Hautes
- Location within France Location within Occitanie
- Coordinates: 43°25′38″N 1°49′03″E
- Country: France
- Region: Occitania
- Department: Haute-Garonne
- Arrondissement: Toulouse
- Canton: Revel
- Intercommunality: CC aux sources du Canal du Midi

Government
  - Mayor (2020–2026): Alain Itier
- Area^{1}: 6.59 km^{2} (2.54 sq mi)
- Elevation: 250 m (820 ft)
- Highest elevation: 311 m (1,020 ft)
- Lowest elevation: 223 m (732 ft)
- Population (2023): 172
  - Density: 26.1/km^{2} (67.6/sq mi)
- Time zone: UTC+01:00 (CET)
  - Summer (DST): UTC+02:00 (CEST)
- INSEE/Postal code: 31393 /31540
- ^{1} French Land Register data, which excludes lakes, ponds, glaciers > 1 km^{2} (0.386 sq mi or 247 acres) and river estuaries.

Mourvilles-Hautes (French pronunciation: [muʁvil ot]; Occitan: Morvilas Nautas) is a commune in the Haute-Garonne department of southwestern France.

== Population ==
Historical population
Year	Pop.	±% p.a.
1968	119	—
1975	120	+0.12%
1982	122	+0.24%
1990	134	+1.18%
1999	167	+2.48%
2007	153	−1.09%
2012	166	+1.64%
2017	169	+0.36%
2023	172	+0.29%
Source: INSEE

== See also ==
- Communes of the Haute-Garonne department
