= Vaudreuille =

- Commune
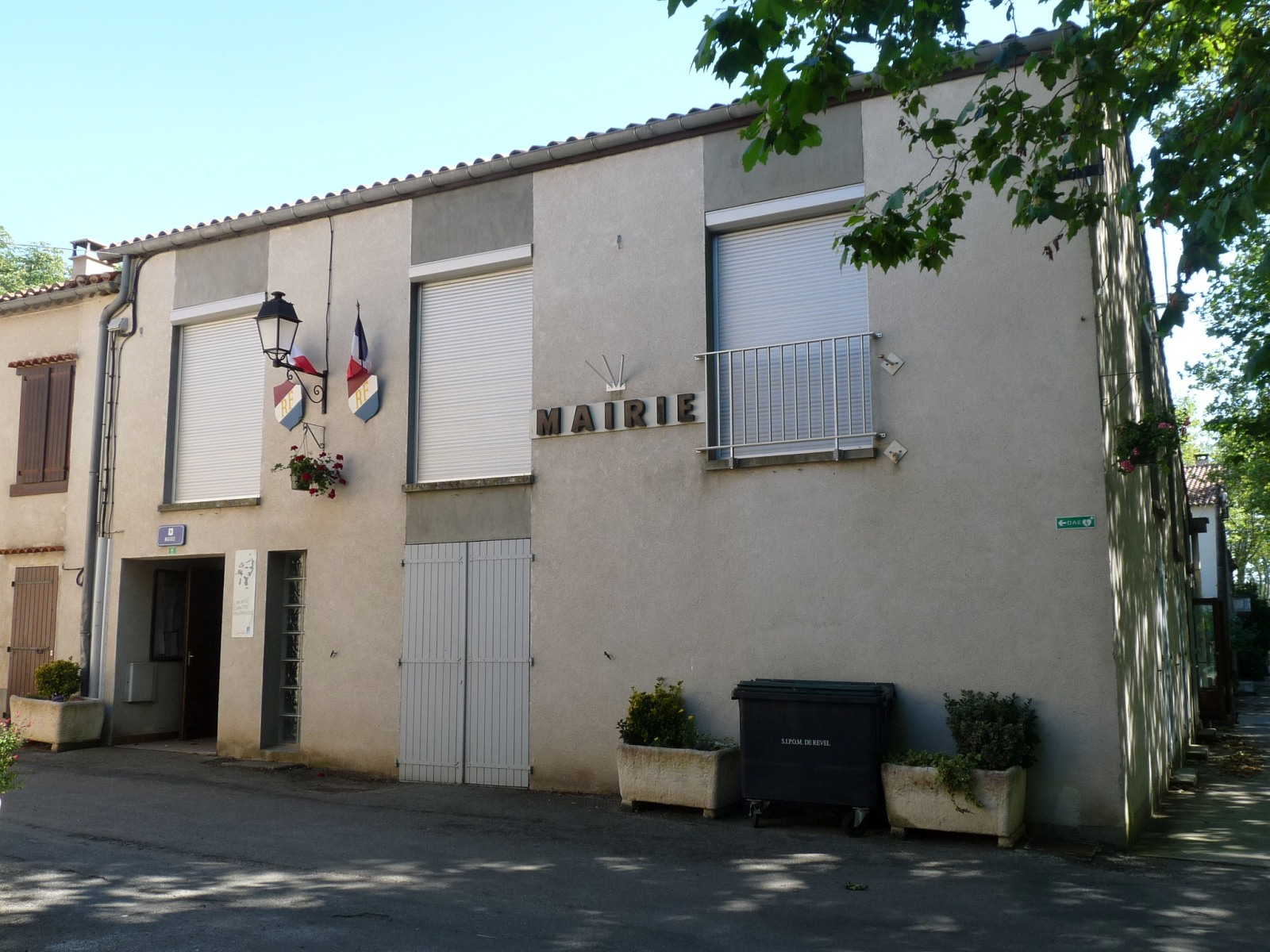
- The town hall in Vaudreuille

- Coat of arms
- Location of Vaudreuille
- Location within France Location within Occitanie
- Coordinates: 43°25′37″N 1°58′57″E
- Country: France
- Region: Occitania
- Department: Haute-Garonne
- Arrondissement: Toulouse
- Canton: Revel
- Intercommunality: CC aux sources du Canal du Midi

Government
  - Mayor (2020–2026): Jean Lagoutte
- Area^{1}: 11.3 km^{2} (4.4 sq mi)
- Elevation: 270 m (890 ft)
- Highest elevation: 575 m (1,886 ft)
- Lowest elevation: 223 m (732 ft)
- Population (2023): 392
  - Density: 34.7/km^{2} (89.8/sq mi)
- Time zone: UTC+01:00 (CET)
  - Summer (DST): UTC+02:00 (CEST)
- INSEE/Postal code: 31569 /31250
- ^{1} French Land Register data, which excludes lakes, ponds, glaciers > 1 km^{2} (0.386 sq mi or 247 acres) and river estuaries.

Vaudreuille is a commune in the Haute-Garonne department in southwestern France.

== Population ==
Historical population
Year	Pop.	±% p.a.
1968	139	—
1975	118	−2.31%
1982	170	+5.35%
1990	246	+4.73%
1999	261	+0.66%
2007	337	+3.25%
2012	357	+1.16%
2017	379	+1.20%
2023	392	+0.56%
Source: INSEE

== See also ==
- Communes of the Haute-Garonne department
