= Roumens =

- Commune
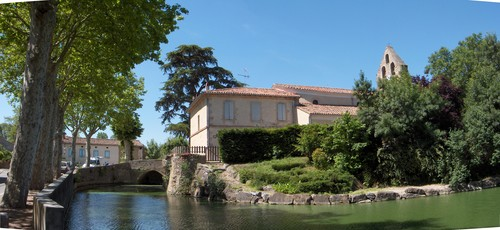
- A view within Roumens
- Location of Roumens
- Location within France Location within Occitanie
- Coordinates: 43°27′53″N 1°55′45″E
- Country: France
- Region: Occitania
- Department: Haute-Garonne
- Arrondissement: Toulouse
- Canton: Revel
- Intercommunality: CC aux sources du Canal du Midi

Government
  - Mayor (2020–2026): Philippe Lasman
- Area^{1}: 3.57 km^{2} (1.38 sq mi)
- Elevation: 200 m (660 ft)
- Highest elevation: 273 m (896 ft)
- Lowest elevation: 193 m (633 ft)
- Population (2023): 250
  - Density: 70/km^{2} (180/sq mi)
- Time zone: UTC+01:00 (CET)
  - Summer (DST): UTC+02:00 (CEST)
- INSEE/Postal code: 31463 /31540
- ^{1} French Land Register data, which excludes lakes, ponds, glaciers > 1 km^{2} (0.386 sq mi or 247 acres) and river estuaries.

Roumens is a commune in the Haute-Garonne department in southwestern France.

== Population ==
Historical population
Year	Pop.	±% p.a.
1968	149	—
1975	141	−0.79%
1982	144	+0.30%
1990	168	+1.95%
1999	202	+2.07%
2007	223	+1.24%
2012	260	+3.12%
2017	242	−1.42%
2023	250	+0.54%
Source: INSEE

== See also ==
- Communes of the Haute-Garonne department
