= Saint-Pierre-de-Lages =

Saint-Pierre de Lages
- Commune
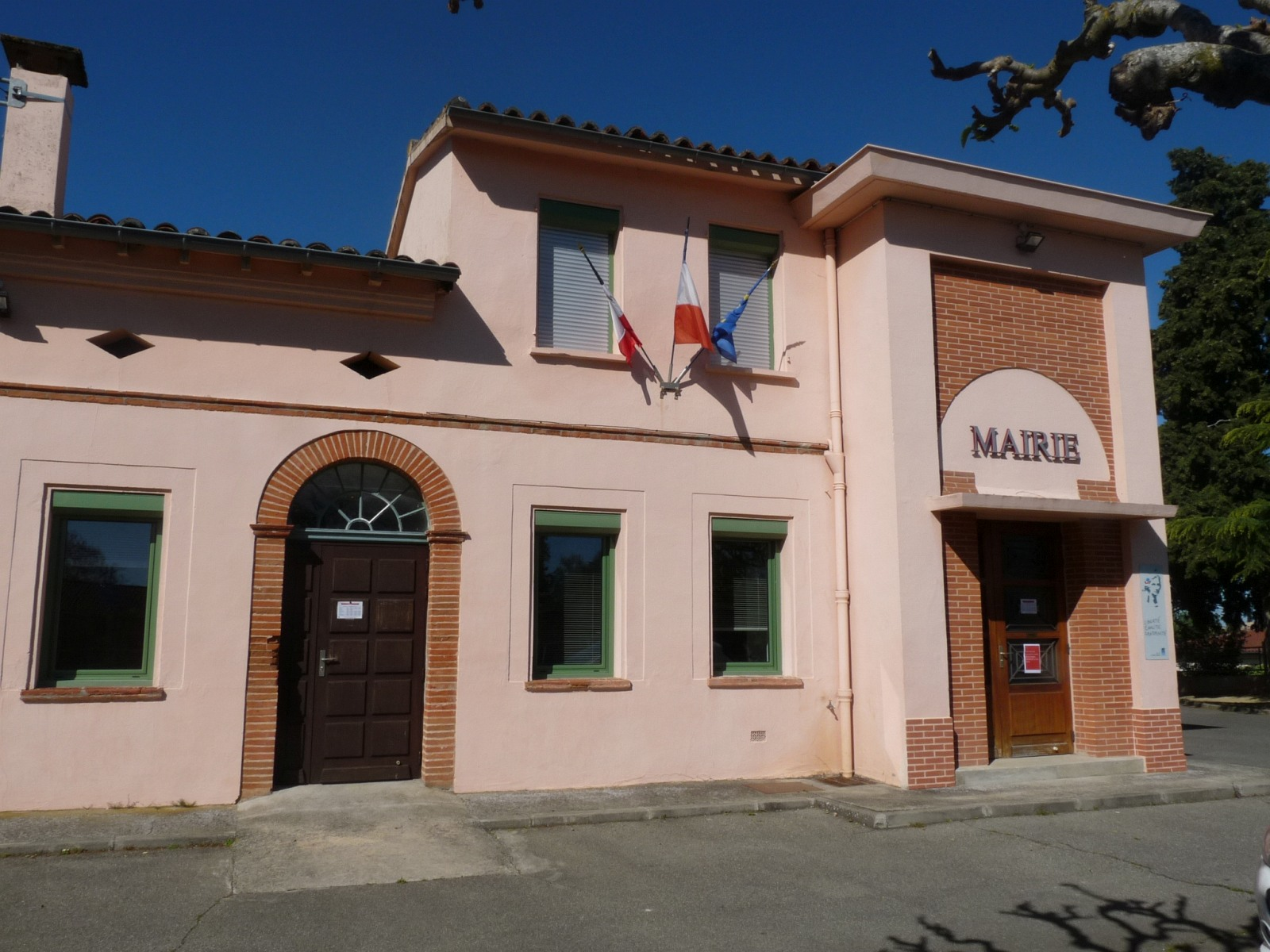
- The town hall in Saint-Pierre-de-Lages

- Coat of arms
- Location of Saint-Pierre de Lages
- Location within France Location within Occitanie
- Coordinates: 43°34′15″N 1°37′32″E
- Country: France
- Region: Occitania
- Department: Haute-Garonne
- Arrondissement: Toulouse
- Canton: Revel

Government
  - Mayor (2020–2026): Fabrice Crepy
- Area^{1}: 7.2 km^{2} (2.8 sq mi)
- Elevation: 250 m (820 ft)
- Highest elevation: 251 m (823 ft)
- Lowest elevation: 165 m (541 ft)
- Population (2023): 886
  - Density: 120/km^{2} (320/sq mi)
- Time zone: UTC+01:00 (CET)
  - Summer (DST): UTC+02:00 (CEST)
- INSEE/Postal code: 31512 /31570
- ^{1} French Land Register data, which excludes lakes, ponds, glaciers > 1 km^{2} (0.386 sq mi or 247 acres) and river estuaries.

Saint-Pierre-de-Lages (French pronunciation: [sɛ̃ pjɛʁ də laʒ]; Occitan: Sant Pèire de Latge) is a commune in the Haute-Garonne department in southwestern France.

== Population ==
Historical population
Year	Pop.	±% p.a.
1968	210	—
1975	257	+2.93%
1982	272	+0.81%
1990	333	+2.56%
1999	377	+1.39%
2007	742	+8.83%
2012	778	+0.95%
2017	886	+2.63%
2023	886	+0.00%
Source: INSEE

== See also ==
- Communes of the Haute-Garonne department
