= Folcarde =

- Commune
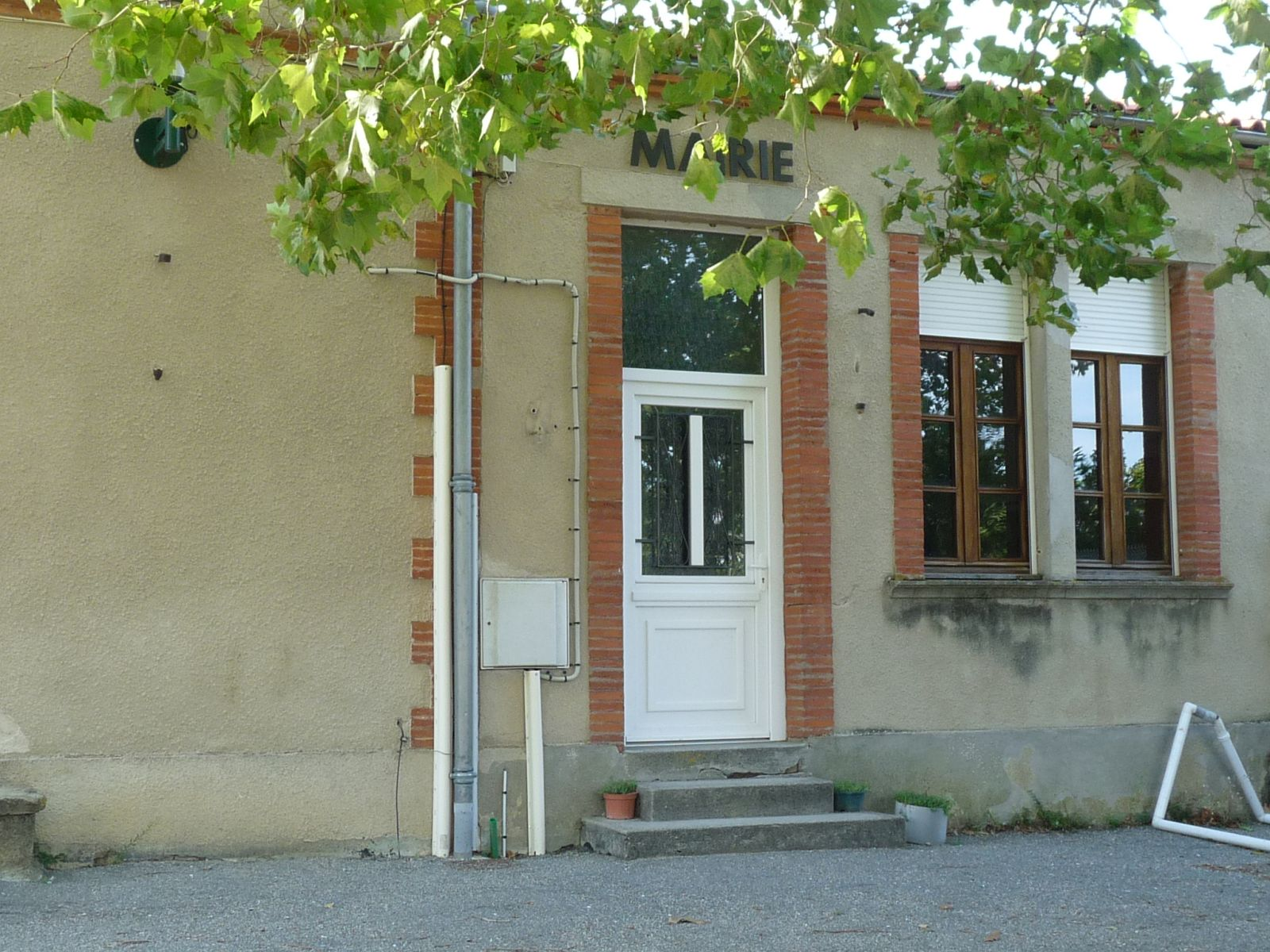
- The town hall in Folcarde

- Coat of arms
- Location of Folcarde
- Location within France Location within Occitanie
- Coordinates: 43°24′17″N 1°47′42″E
- Country: France
- Region: Occitania
- Department: Haute-Garonne
- Arrondissement: Toulouse
- Canton: Revel

Government
  - Mayor (2023–2026): Antoine Guagno
- Area^{1}: 2.33 km^{2} (0.90 sq mi)
- Elevation: 230 m (750 ft)
- Highest elevation: 271 m (889 ft)
- Lowest elevation: 205 m (673 ft)
- Population (2023): 118
  - Density: 50.6/km^{2} (131/sq mi)
- Time zone: UTC+01:00 (CET)
  - Summer (DST): UTC+02:00 (CEST)
- INSEE/Postal code: 31185 /31290
- ^{1} French Land Register data, which excludes lakes, ponds, glaciers > 1 km^{2} (0.386 sq mi or 247 acres) and river estuaries.

Folcarde is a commune in the Haute-Garonne department in southwestern France.

== Population ==
Historical population
Year	Pop.	±% p.a.
1968	76	—
1975	93	+2.93%
1982	88	−0.79%
1990	94	+0.83%
1999	86	−0.98%
2007	121	+4.36%
2012	129	+1.29%
2017	118	−1.77%
2023	118	+0.00%
Source: INSEE

== See also ==
- Communes of the Haute-Garonne department
