= Maureville =

- Commune
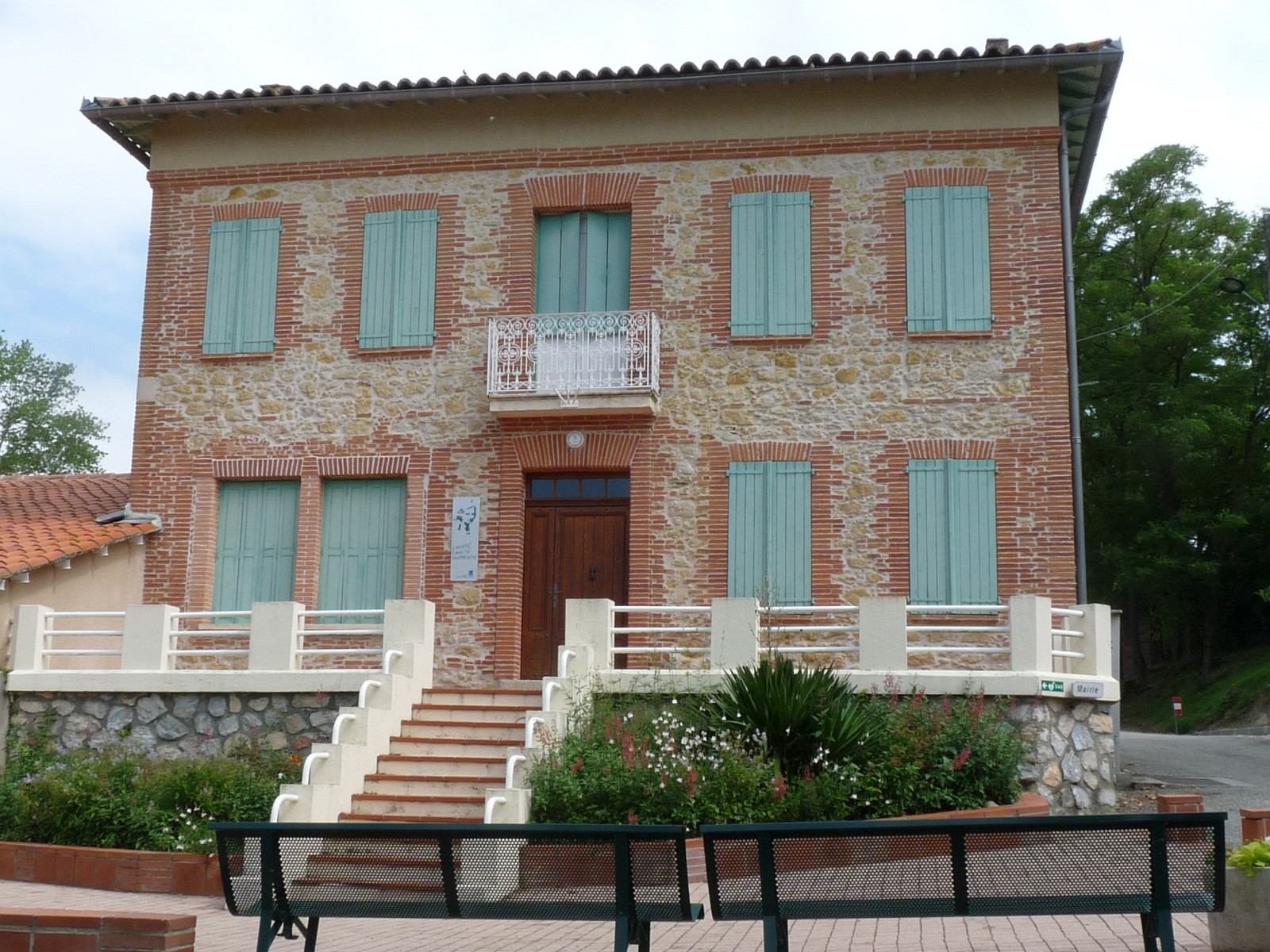
- The town hall in Maureville
- Location of Maureville
- Location within France Location within Occitanie
- Coordinates: 43°31′29″N 1°42′08″E
- Country: France
- Region: Occitania
- Department: Haute-Garonne
- Arrondissement: Toulouse
- Canton: Revel

Government
  - Mayor (2020–2026): Christian Croux
- Area^{1}: 9.9 km^{2} (3.8 sq mi)
- Elevation: 232 m (761 ft)
- Highest elevation: 276 m (906 ft)
- Lowest elevation: 175 m (574 ft)
- Population (2023): 296
  - Density: 30/km^{2} (77/sq mi)
- Time zone: UTC+01:00 (CET)
  - Summer (DST): UTC+02:00 (CEST)
- INSEE/Postal code: 31331 /31460
- ^{1} French Land Register data, which excludes lakes, ponds, glaciers > 1 km^{2} (0.386 sq mi or 247 acres) and river estuaries.

Maureville (French pronunciation: [moʁvil]; Occitan: Maurevila) is a commune in the Haute-Garonne department, in the Occitanie region of southwestern France. In 2022, the population was 295.

The rural commune belonged to the historic region of Lauragais, from which it derives its history and culture. It is primarily an agricultural commune, with a large share of the population commuting to work in nearby Toulouse. Partly due to the proximity of Toulouse, the population decreased throughout the industrial era, before returning to a modest growth in the early 21st century.

The bus line 356 of the Arc-en-Ciel network links the commune to Toulouse bus station and Revel.

== Population ==
Historical population
Year	Pop.	±% p.a.
1968	185	—
1975	180	−0.39%
1982	218	+2.77%
1990	208	−0.59%
1999	266	+2.77%
2007	286	+0.91%
2012	304	+1.23%
2017	304	+0.00%
2023	296	−0.44%
Source: INSEE

== See also ==
- Communes of the Haute-Garonne department
