= La Salvetat-Lauragais =

- Commune
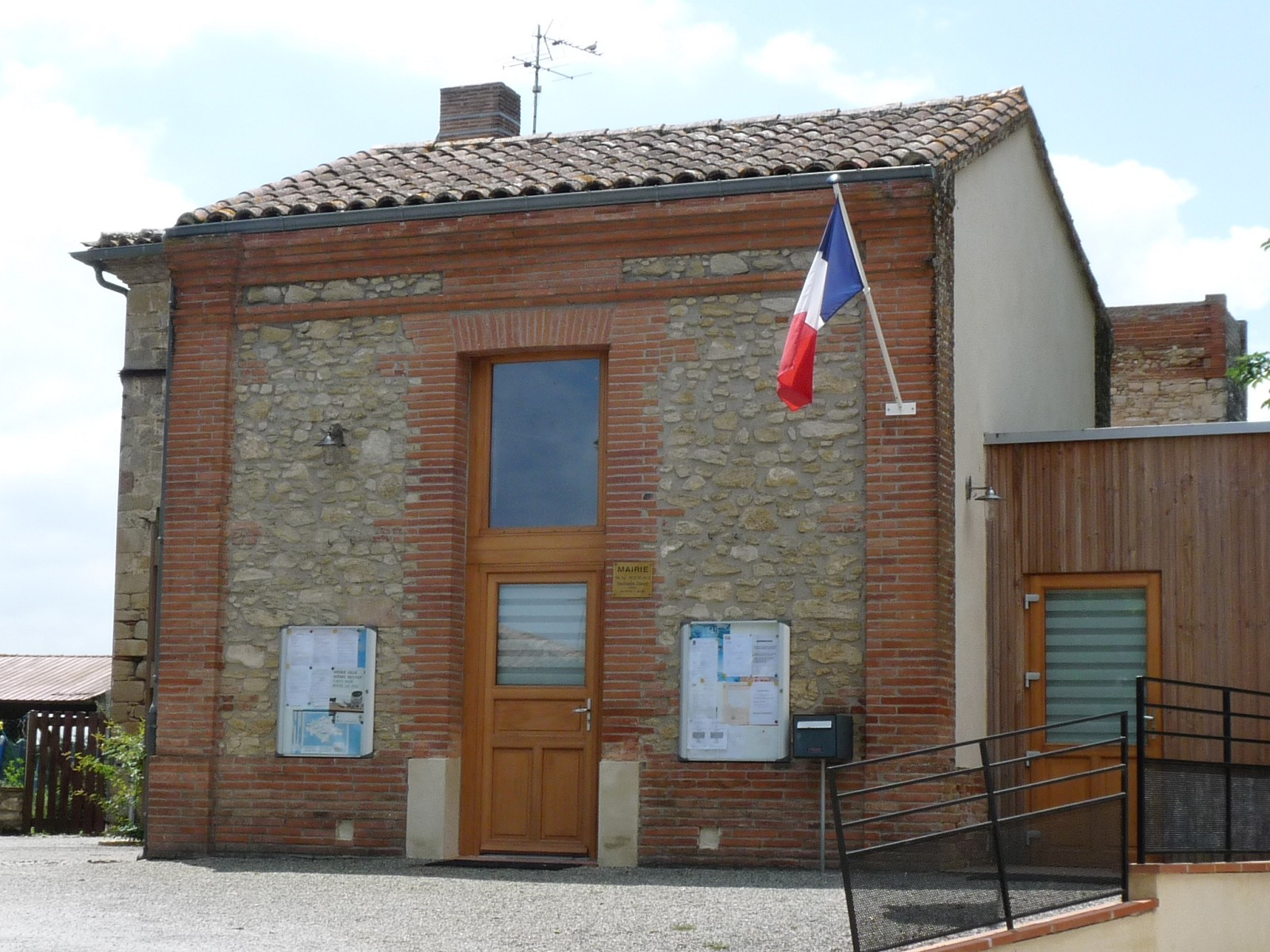
- The town hall in La Salvetat-Lauragais
- Location of La Salvetat-Lauragais
- Location within France Location within Occitanie
- Coordinates: 43°32′35″N 1°47′46″E
- Country: France
- Region: Occitania
- Department: Haute-Garonne
- Arrondissement: Toulouse
- Canton: Revel

Government
  - Mayor (2020–2026): Jean-Pierre Cazelles
- Area^{1}: 3.66 km^{2} (1.41 sq mi)
- Elevation: 230 m (750 ft)
- Highest elevation: 255 m (837 ft)
- Lowest elevation: 177 m (581 ft)
- Population (2023): 151
  - Density: 41.3/km^{2} (107/sq mi)
- Time zone: UTC+01:00 (CET)
  - Summer (DST): UTC+02:00 (CEST)
- INSEE/Postal code: 31527 /31460
- ^{1} French Land Register data, which excludes lakes, ponds, glaciers > 1 km^{2} (0.386 sq mi or 247 acres) and river estuaries.

La Salvetat-Lauragais (French pronunciation: [la salvəta loʁaɡɛ]; Occitan: La Salvetat de Lauragués) is a commune in the Haute-Garonne department in southwestern France.

== Population ==
Historical population
Year	Pop.	±% p.a.
1968	103	—
1975	68	−5.76%
1982	65	−0.64%
1990	70	+0.93%
1999	97	+3.69%
2007	137	+4.41%
2012	135	−0.29%
2017	143	+1.16%
2023	151	+0.91%
Source: INSEE

== See also ==
- Communes of the Haute-Garonne department
