= Saint-Julia =

- Commune
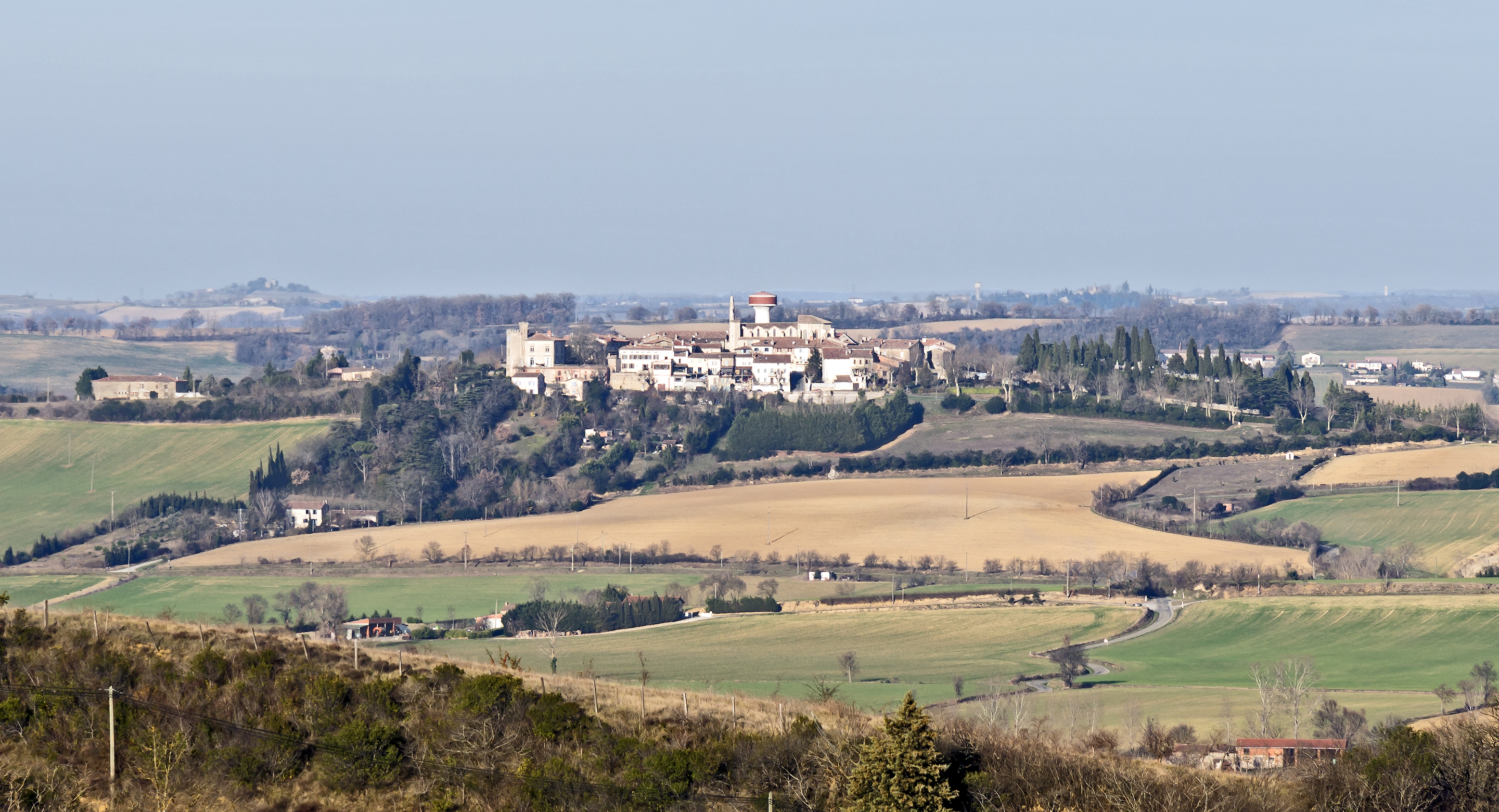
- A general view of Saint-Julia

- Coat of arms
- Location of Saint-Julia
- Location within France Location within Occitanie
- Coordinates: 43°29′28″N 1°53′54″E
- Country: France
- Region: Occitania
- Department: Haute-Garonne
- Arrondissement: Toulouse
- Canton: Revel
- Intercommunality: CC aux sources du Canal du Midi

Government
  - Mayor (2020–2026): Christian Lagente
- Area^{1}: 11.46 km^{2} (4.42 sq mi)
- Elevation: 293 m (961 ft)
- Highest elevation: 301 m (988 ft)
- Lowest elevation: 200 m (660 ft)
- Population (2023): 418
  - Density: 36.5/km^{2} (94.5/sq mi)
- Time zone: UTC+01:00 (CET)
  - Summer (DST): UTC+02:00 (CEST)
- INSEE/Postal code: 31491 /31540
- ^{1} French Land Register data, which excludes lakes, ponds, glaciers > 1 km^{2} (0.386 sq mi or 247 acres) and river estuaries.

Saint-Julia (French pronunciation: [sɛ̃ ʒylja]; Occitan: Sent Julian) is a commune in the Haute-Garonne department in southwestern France.

== Population ==
Historical population
Year	Pop.	±% p.a.
1968	382	—
1975	370	−0.45%
1982	314	−2.32%
1990	305	−0.36%
1999	333	+0.98%
2007	381	+1.70%
2012	365	−0.85%
2017	412	+2.45%
2023	418	+0.24%
Source: INSEE

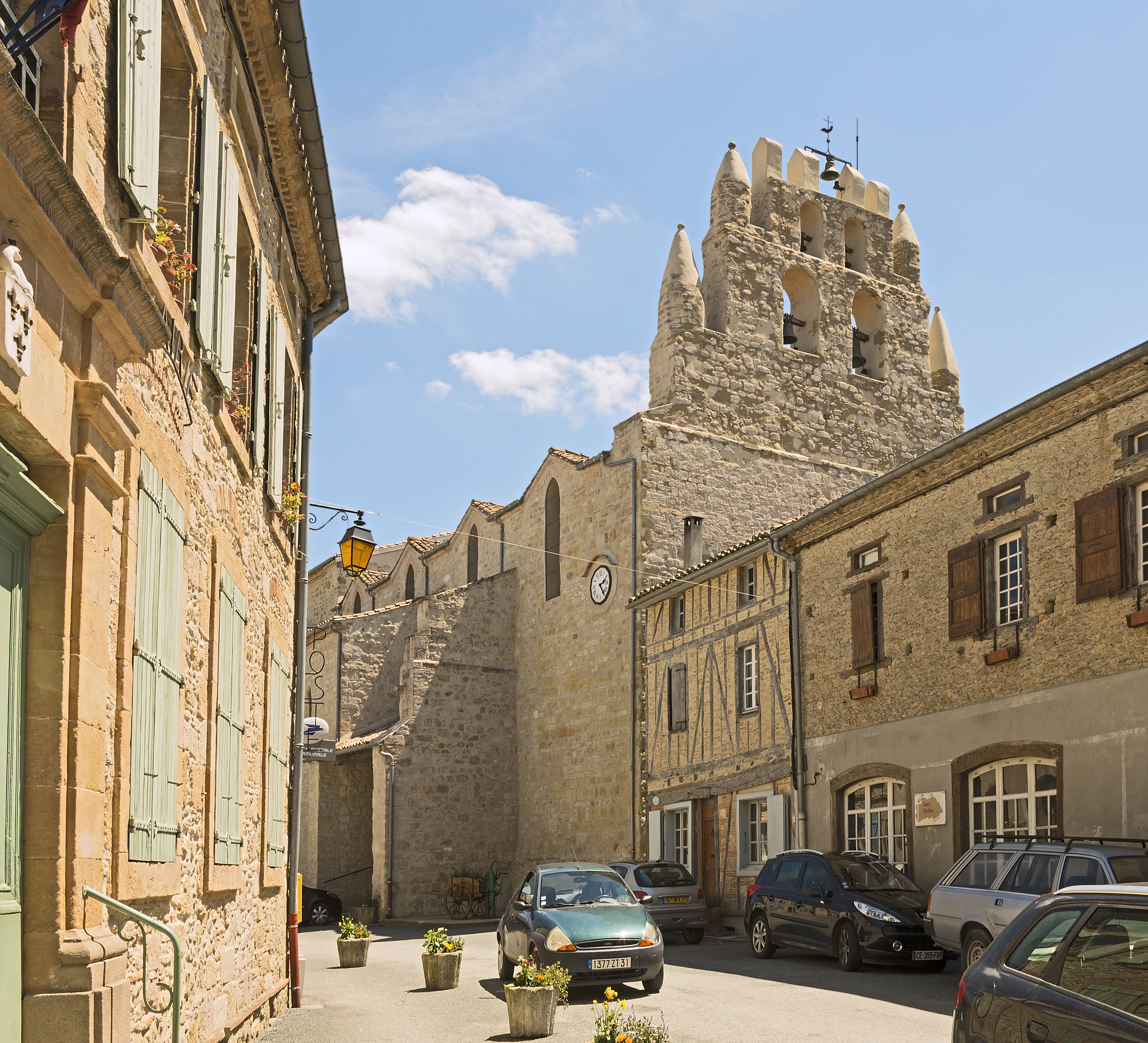
Church and Town hall

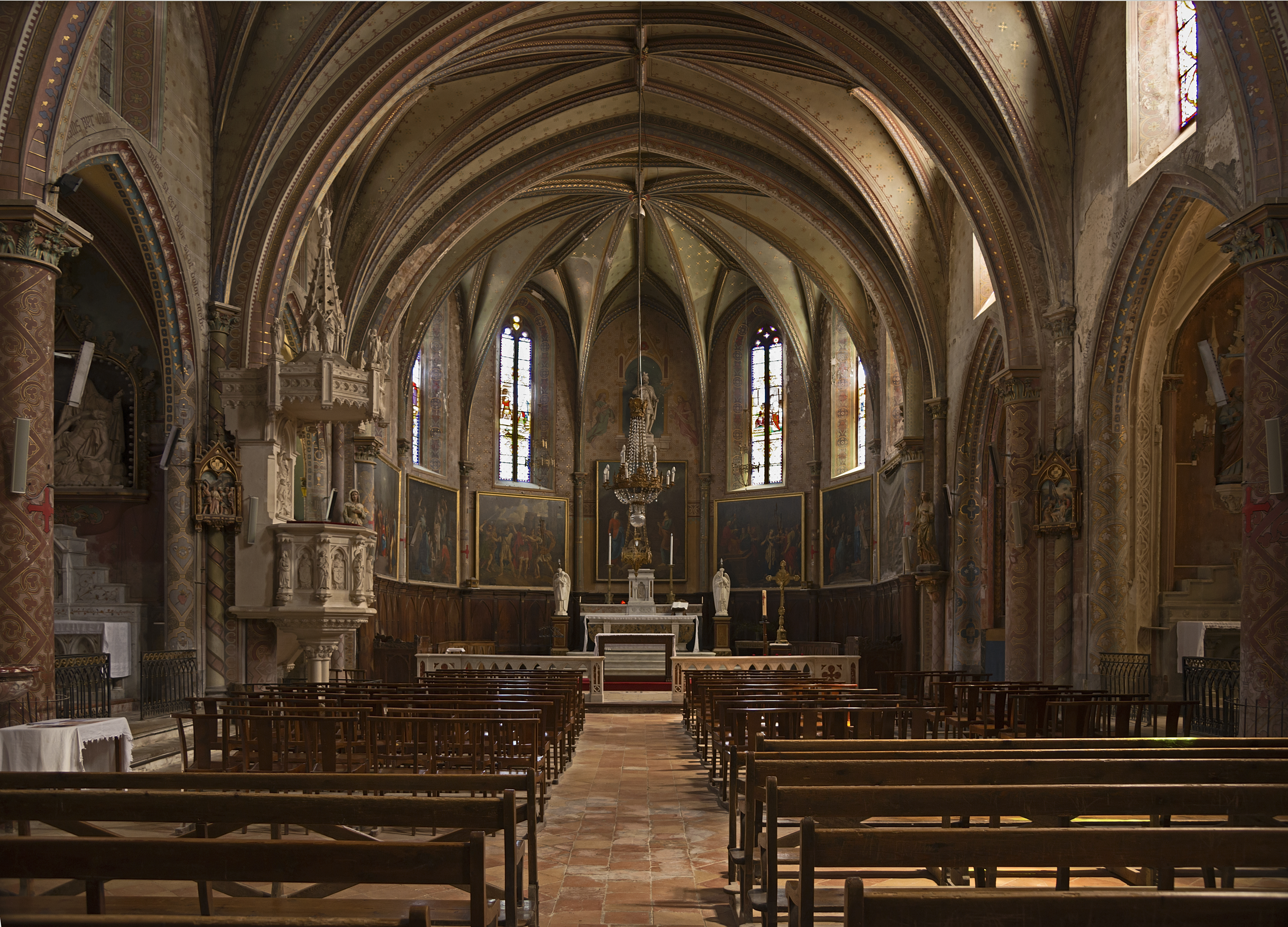
Interior of church

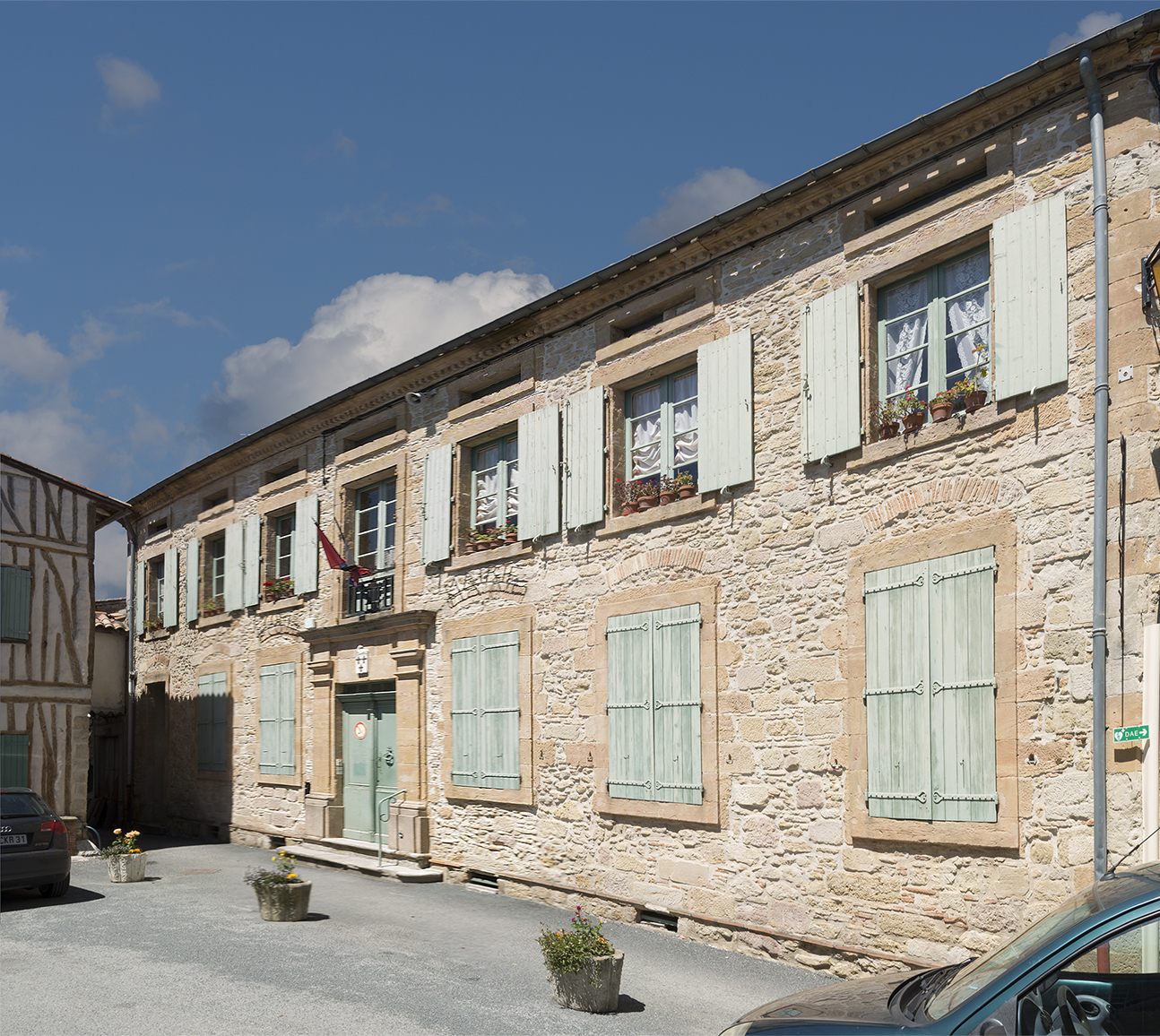
Town hall

== See also ==
- Communes of the Haute-Garonne department
