= Maurens, Haute-Garonne =

Maurens
- Commune
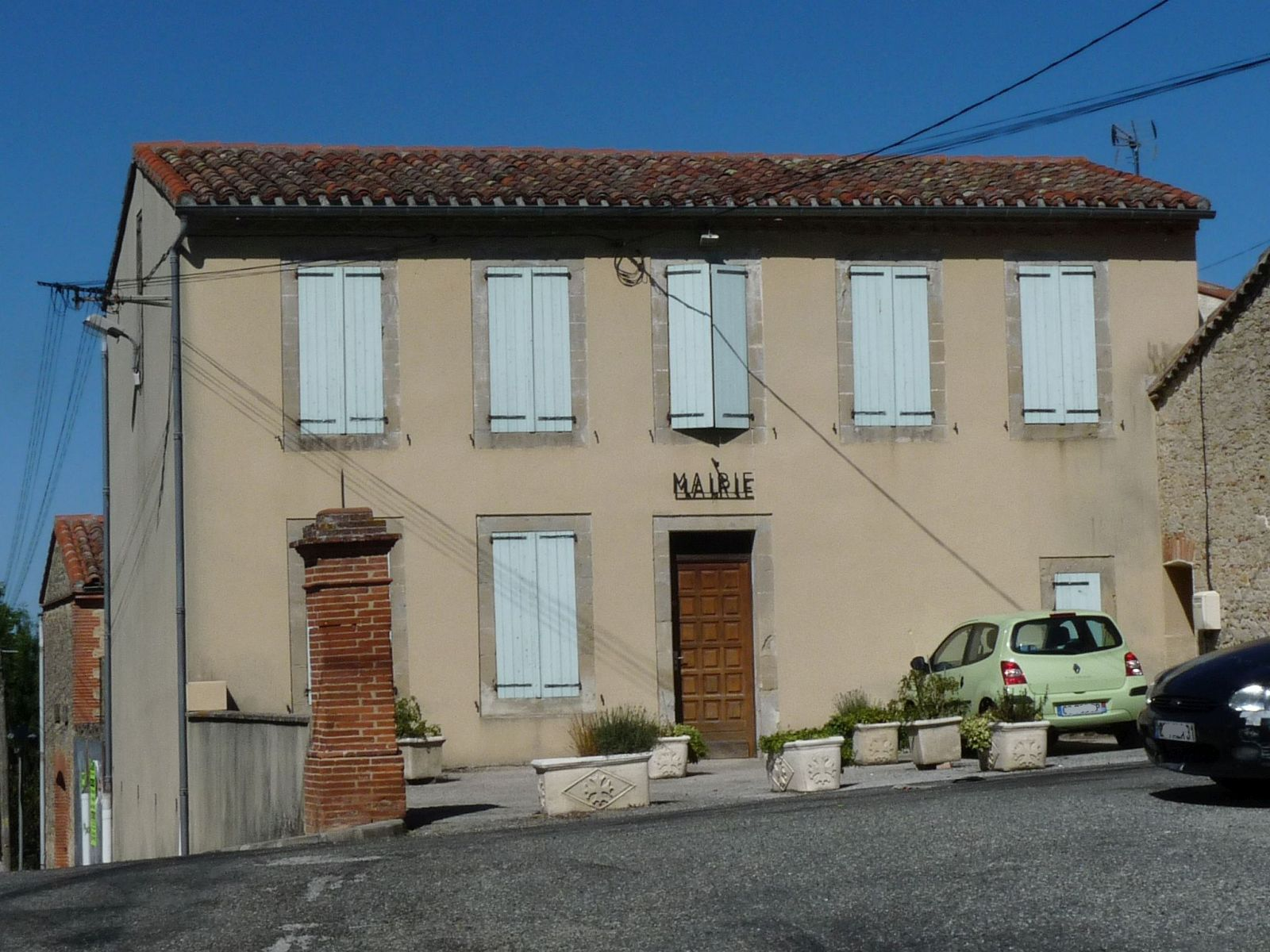
- The town hall in Maurens

- Coat of arms
- Location of Maurens
- Location within France Location within Occitanie
- Coordinates: 43°27′59″N 1°47′45″E
- Country: France
- Region: Occitania
- Department: Haute-Garonne
- Arrondissement: Toulouse
- Canton: Revel
- Intercommunality: CC aux sources du Canal du Midi

Government
  - Mayor (2020–2026): Christiane Palosse
- Area^{1}: 6.6 km^{2} (2.5 sq mi)
- Elevation: 270 m (890 ft)
- Highest elevation: 271 m (889 ft)
- Lowest elevation: 209 m (686 ft)
- Population (2023): 207
  - Density: 31/km^{2} (81/sq mi)
- Time zone: UTC+01:00 (CET)
  - Summer (DST): UTC+02:00 (CEST)
- INSEE/Postal code: 31329 /31540
- ^{1} French Land Register data, which excludes lakes, ponds, glaciers > 1 km^{2} (0.386 sq mi or 247 acres) and river estuaries.

Maurens is a commune in the Haute-Garonne department in southwestern France.

== Population ==
Historical population
Year	Pop.	±% p.a.
1968	139	—
1975	122	−1.85%
1982	118	−0.48%
1990	143	+2.43%
1999	169	+1.87%
2007	201	+2.19%
2012	198	−0.30%
2017	206	+0.80%
2023	207	+0.08%
Source: INSEE

== See also ==
- Communes of the Haute-Garonne department
