= Saint-Vincent, Haute-Garonne =

Saint-Vincent
- Commune
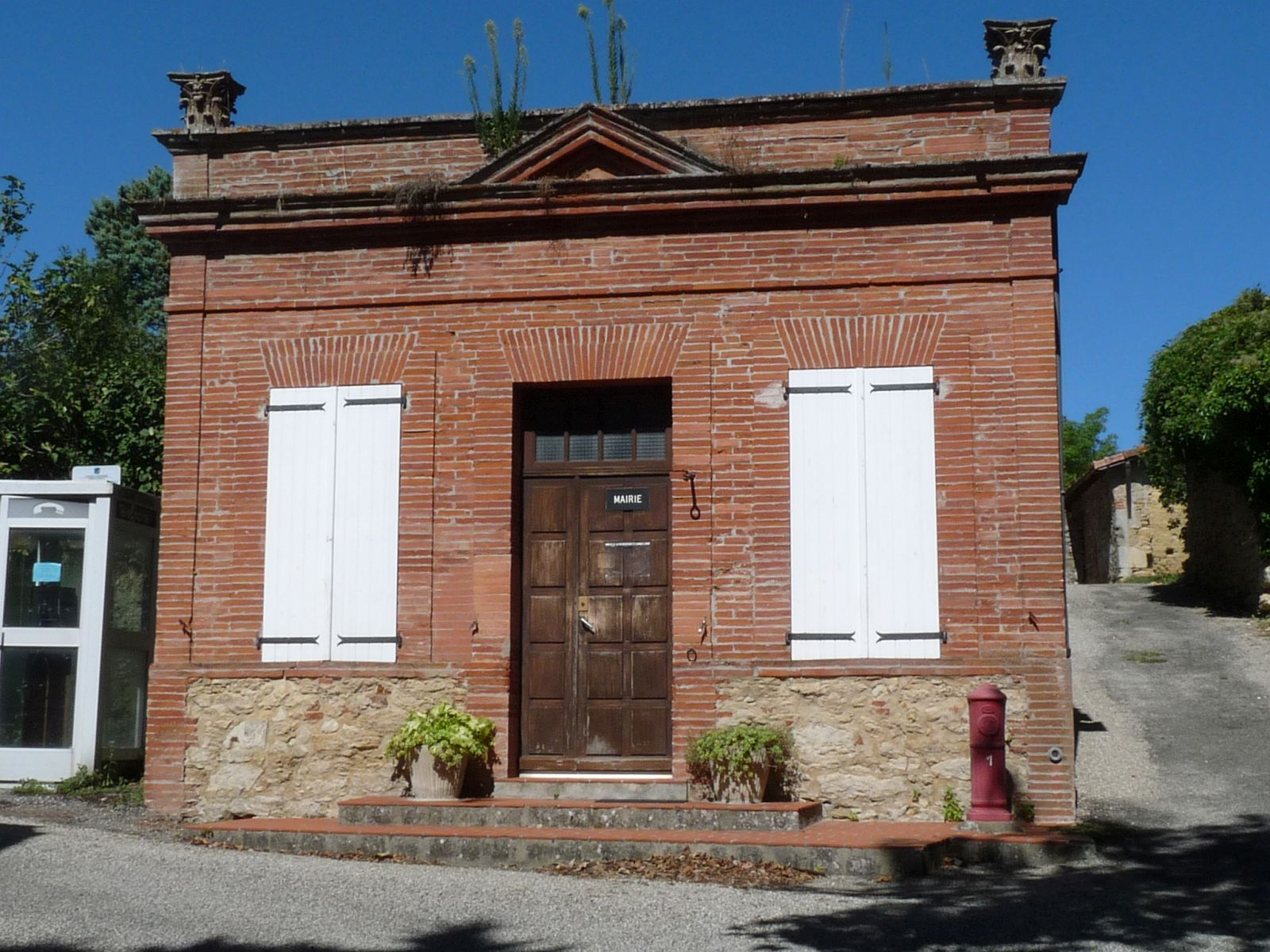
- The town hall in Saint-Vincent

- Coat of arms
- Location of Saint-Vincent
- Location within France Location within Occitanie
- Coordinates: 43°26′27″N 1°45′32″E
- Country: France
- Region: Occitania
- Department: Haute-Garonne
- Arrondissement: Toulouse
- Canton: Revel

Government
  - Mayor (2020–2026): Alain Rouquayrol
- Area^{1}: 3.07 km^{2} (1.19 sq mi)
- Elevation: 250 m (820 ft)
- Highest elevation: 243 m (797 ft)
- Lowest elevation: 193 m (633 ft)
- Population (2023): 215
  - Density: 70.0/km^{2} (181/sq mi)
- Time zone: UTC+01:00 (CET)
  - Summer (DST): UTC+02:00 (CEST)
- INSEE/Postal code: 31519 /31290
- ^{1} French Land Register data, which excludes lakes, ponds, glaciers > 1 km^{2} (0.386 sq mi or 247 acres) and river estuaries.

Saint-Vincent (French pronunciation: [sɛ̃ vɛ̃sɑ̃]; Languedocien: Sent Vincenç) is a commune in the Haute-Garonne department in southwestern France.

== Population ==
Historical population
Year	Pop.	±% p.a.
1968	47	—
1975	34	−4.52%
1982	47	+4.73%
1990	60	+3.10%
1999	99	+5.72%
2007	151	+5.42%
2012	182	+3.81%
2017	192	+1.08%
2023	215	+1.90%
Source: INSEE

== See also ==
- Communes of the Haute-Garonne department
