= Caragoudes =

- Commune
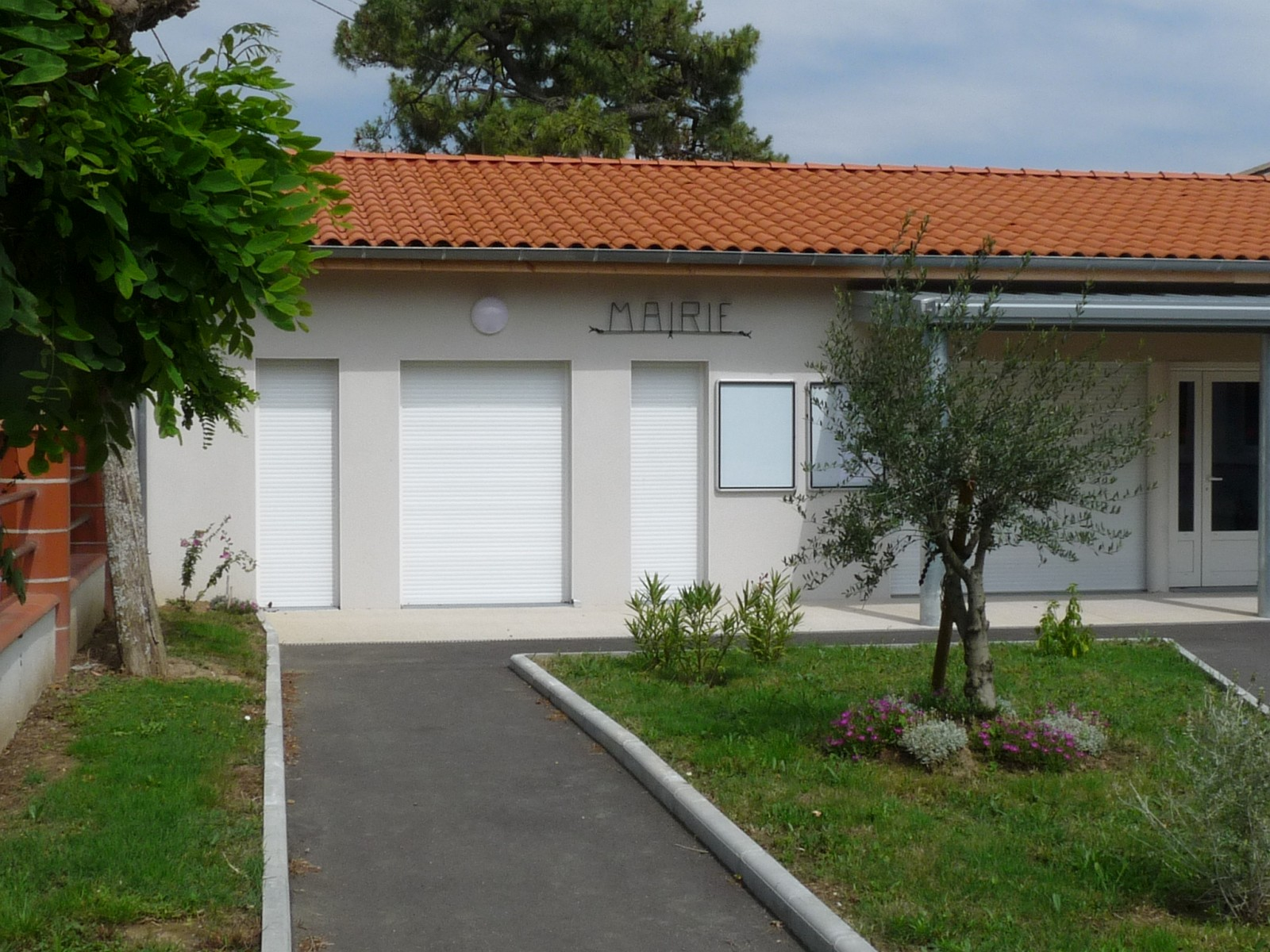
- Town hall

- Coat of arms
- Location of Caragoudes
- Location within France Location within Occitanie
- Coordinates: 43°30′01″N 1°42′07″E
- Country: France
- Region: Occitania
- Department: Haute-Garonne
- Arrondissement: Toulouse
- Canton: Revel

Government
  - Mayor (2020–2026): Jean-Jacques Claret
- Area^{1}: 8.31 km^{2} (3.21 sq mi)
- Elevation: 215 m (705 ft)
- Highest elevation: 263 m (863 ft)
- Lowest elevation: 175 m (574 ft)
- Population (2023): 239
  - Density: 28.8/km^{2} (74.5/sq mi)
- Time zone: UTC+01:00 (CET)
  - Summer (DST): UTC+02:00 (CEST)
- INSEE/Postal code: 31105 /31460
- ^{1} French Land Register data, which excludes lakes, ponds, glaciers > 1 km^{2} (0.386 sq mi or 247 acres) and river estuaries.

Caragoudes (French pronunciation: [kaʁaɡud]; Occitan: Caragodas) is a commune in the Haute-Garonne department in southwestern France.

== Population ==
Historical population
Year	Pop.	±% p.a.
1968	159	—
1975	138	−2.00%
1982	152	+1.39%
1990	166	+1.11%
1999	213	+2.81%
2007	240	+1.50%
2012	230	−0.85%
2017	223	−0.62%
2023	239	+1.16%
Source: INSEE

== See also ==
- Communes of the Haute-Garonne department
