= Seilh =

- Commune
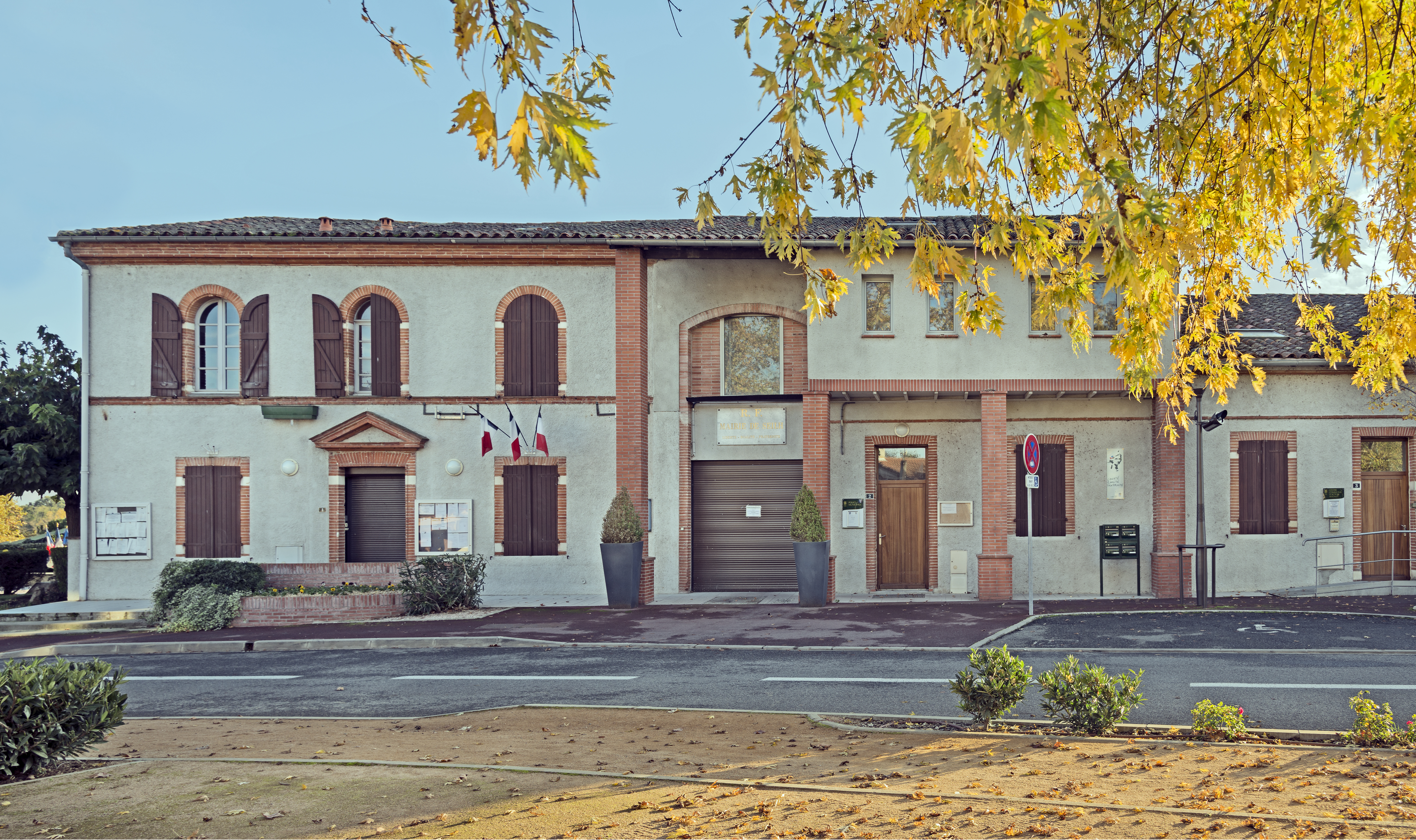
- The town hall in Seilh

- Coat of arms
- Location of Seilh
- Location within France Location within Occitanie
- Coordinates: 43°41′44″N 1°21′15″E
- Country: France
- Region: Occitania
- Department: Haute-Garonne
- Arrondissement: Toulouse
- Canton: Blagnac
- Intercommunality: Toulouse Métropole

Government
  - Mayor (2020–2026): Didier Castéra
- Area^{1}: 6.16 km^{2} (2.38 sq mi)
- Elevation: 120 m (390 ft)
- Highest elevation: 145 m (476 ft)
- Lowest elevation: 112 m (367 ft)
- Population (2023): 3,356
  - Density: 545/km^{2} (1,410/sq mi)
- Time zone: UTC+01:00 (CET)
  - Summer (DST): UTC+02:00 (CEST)
- INSEE/Postal code: 31541 /31840
- ^{1} French Land Register data, which excludes lakes, ponds, glaciers > 1 km^{2} (0.386 sq mi or 247 acres) and river estuaries.

Seilh (French pronunciation: [sɛj]; Occitan: Selh) is a commune in the Haute-Garonne department in southwestern France.

== Population ==
Historical population
Year	Pop.	±% p.a.
1968	449	—
1975	492	+1.32%
1982	621	+3.38%
1990	816	+3.47%
1999	2,086	+10.99%
2007	2,916	+4.28%
2012	3,018	+0.69%
2017	3,268	+1.60%
2023	3,356	+0.44%
Source: INSEE

== Monument ==
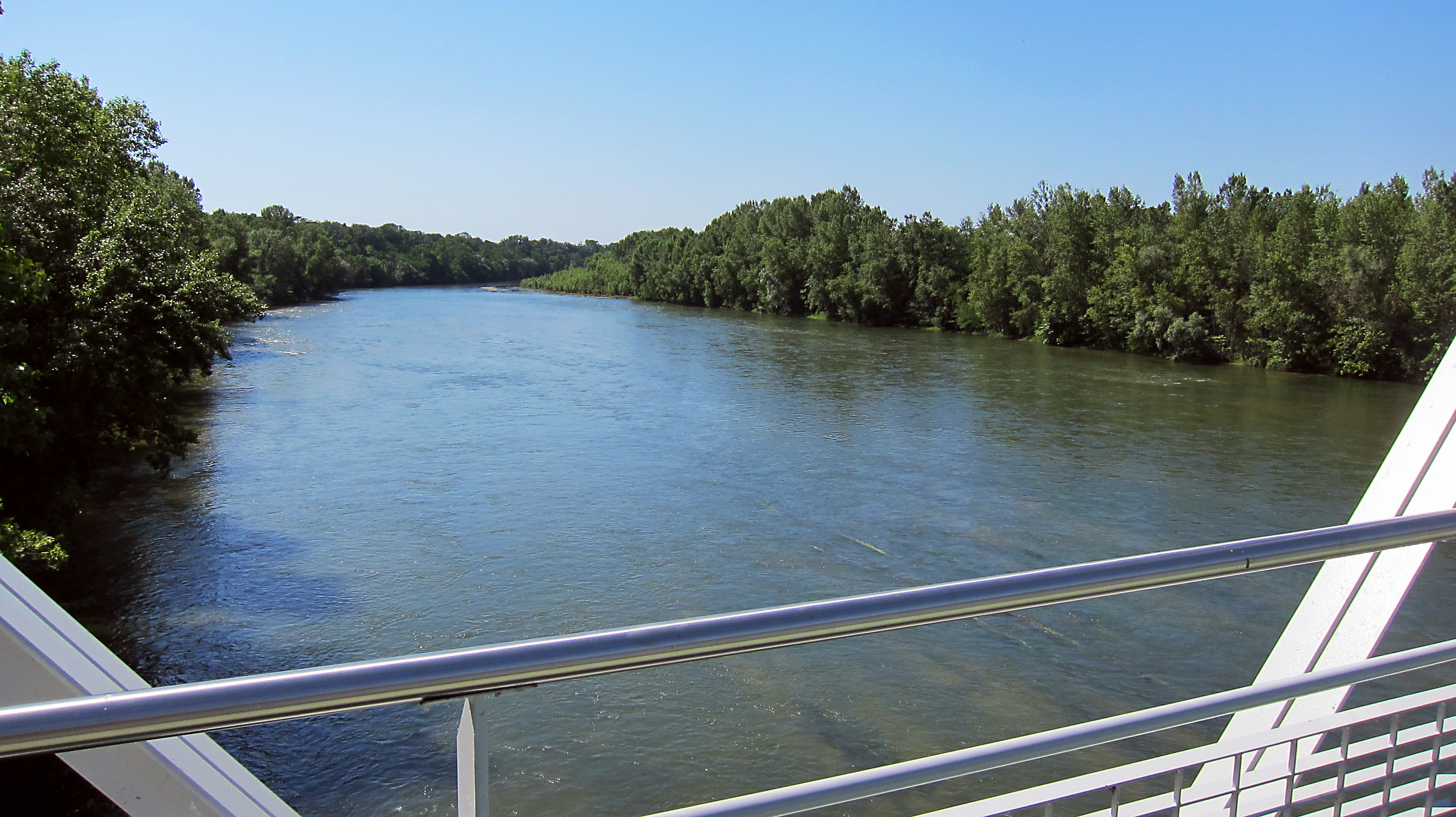
The Garonne

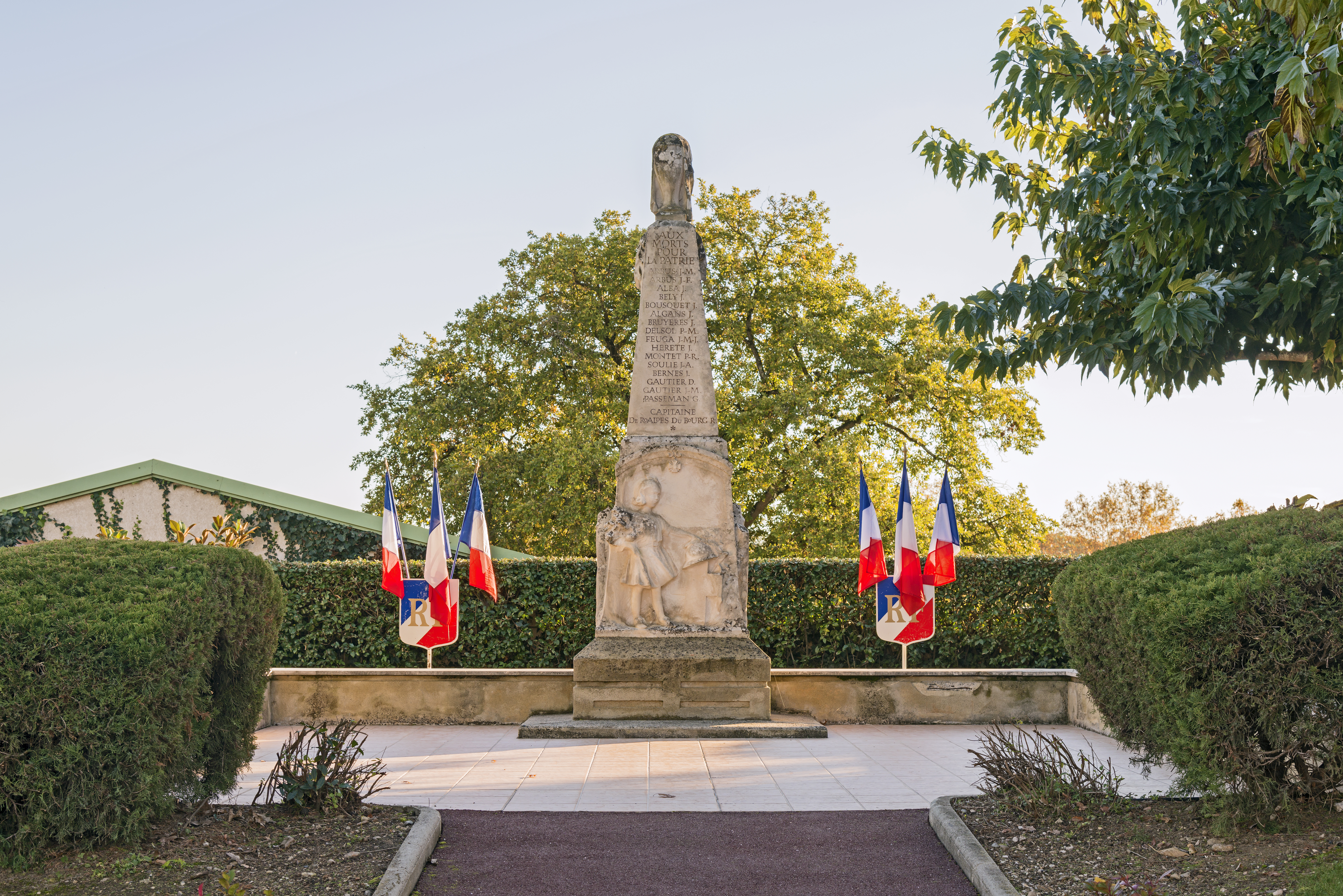
War memorial

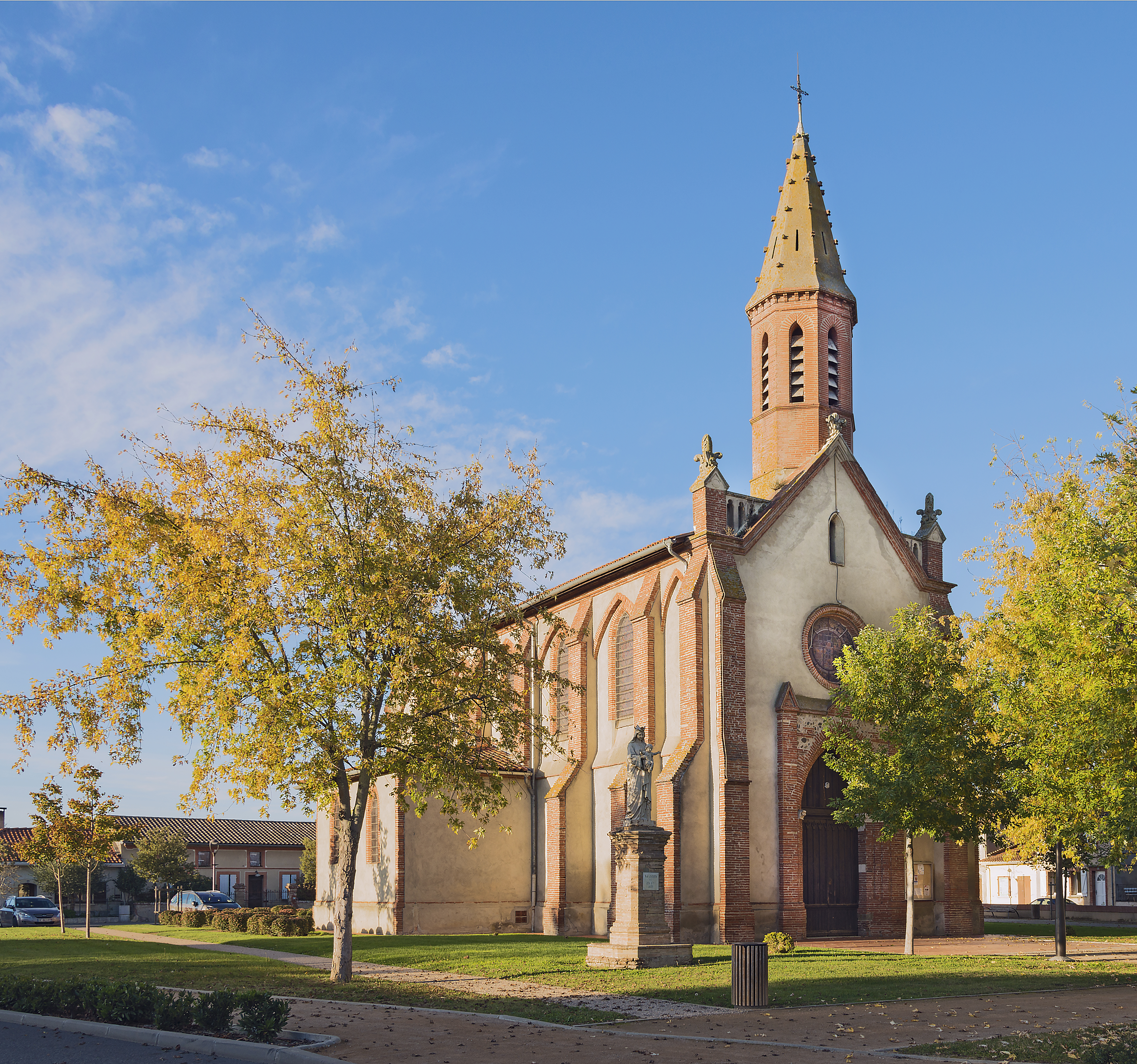
Church

== See also ==
- Communes of the Haute-Garonne department
