= Canton of Blagnac =

Coordinates: 43.63°N 1.39°E

The canton of Blagnac is an administrative division of the Haute-Garonne department, southern France. Its borders were modified at the French canton reorganisation which came into effect in March 2015. Its seat is in Blagnac.

It consists of the following communes:

1. Aussonne
2. Beauzelle
3. Blagnac
4. Cornebarrieu
5. Mondonville
6. Seilh
