= Cornebarrieu =

- Commune
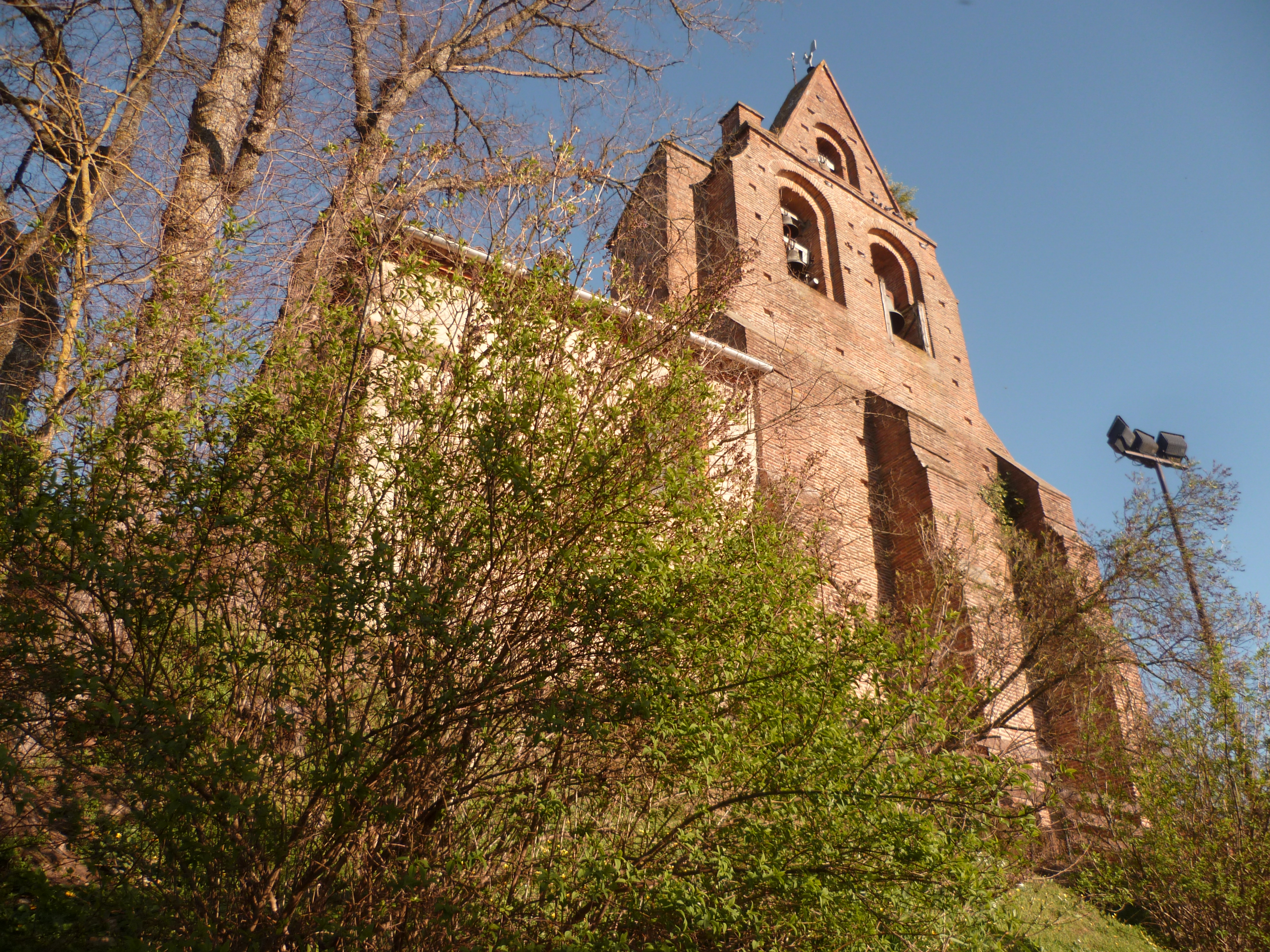
- The church in Cornebarrieu

- Coat of arms
- Location of Cornebarrieu
- Location within France Location within Occitanie
- Coordinates: 43°39′00″N 1°19′38″E
- Country: France
- Region: Occitania
- Department: Haute-Garonne
- Arrondissement: Toulouse
- Canton: Blagnac
- Intercommunality: Toulouse Métropole

Government
  - Mayor (2020–2026): Alain Toppan
- Area^{1}: 18.7 km^{2} (7.2 sq mi)
- Elevation: 180 m (590 ft)
- Highest elevation: 188 m (617 ft)
- Lowest elevation: 130 m (430 ft)
- Population (2023): 8,978
  - Density: 480/km^{2} (1,240/sq mi)
- Time zone: UTC+01:00 (CET)
  - Summer (DST): UTC+02:00 (CEST)
- INSEE/Postal code: 31150 /31700
- ^{1} French Land Register data, which excludes lakes, ponds, glaciers > 1 km^{2} (0.386 sq mi or 247 acres) and river estuaries.

Cornebarrieu (French pronunciation: [kɔʁnəbaʁjø]; Occitan: Còrnabarriu) is a commune in the Haute-Garonne department in southwestern France.

== Population ==
Historical population

Year	Pop.	±% p.a.
1936	777	—
1954	1,034	+1.60%
1962	1,217	+2.06%
1968	1,844	+7.17%
1975	2,524	+4.59%
1982	2,803	+1.51%

Year	Pop.	±% p.a.
1990	3,794	+3.86%
1999	4,694	+2.39%
2007	5,556	+2.13%
2012	5,798	+0.86%
2017	6,592	+2.60%
2023	8,978	+5.28%

Source: EHESS and INSEE (1968-2023)

== See also ==
- Communes of the Haute-Garonne department
