= Aussonne =

- Commune
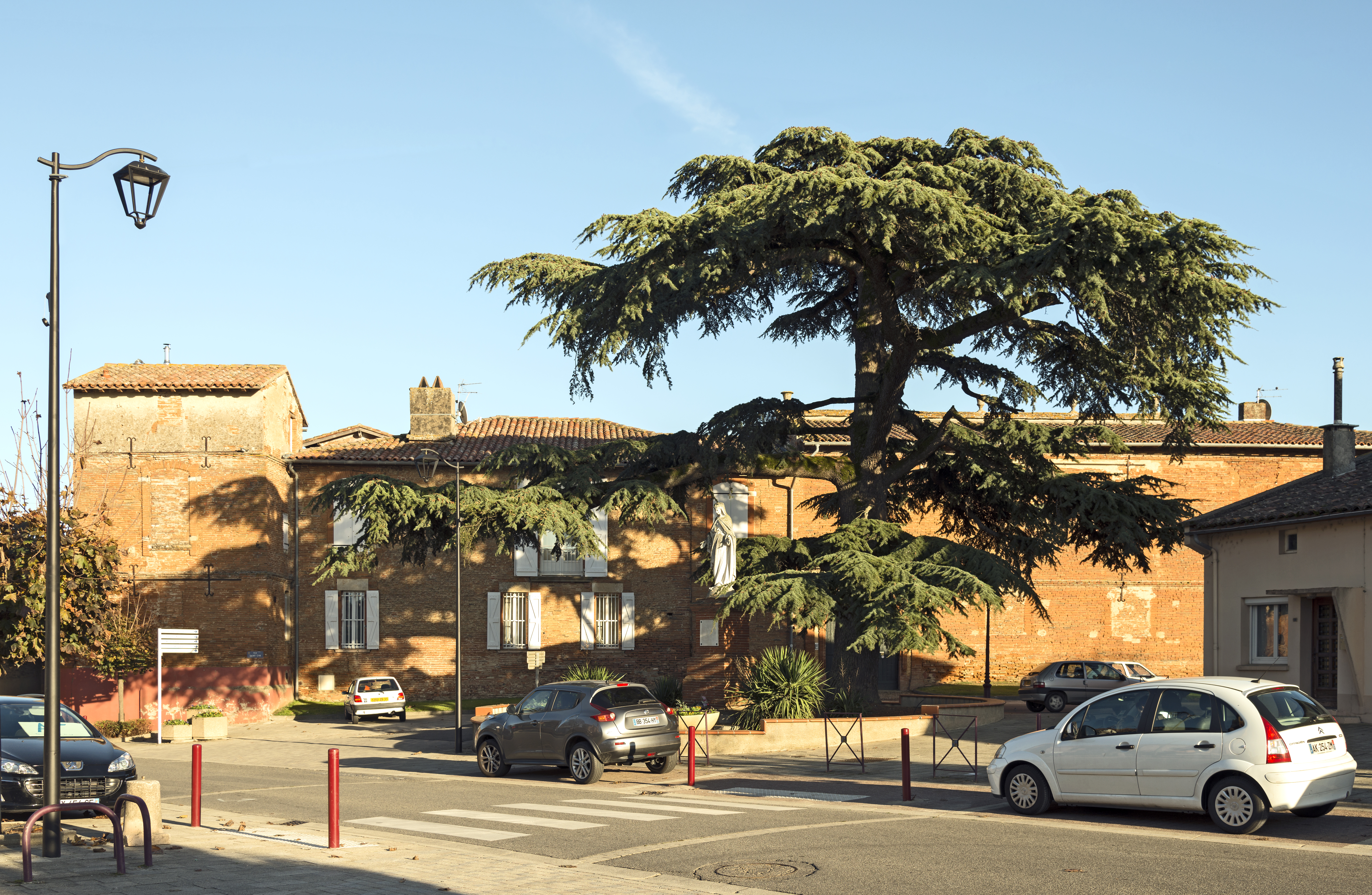
- The chateau in Aussonne

- Coat of arms
- Location of Aussonne
- Location within France Location within Occitanie
- Coordinates: 43°41′05″N 1°19′14″E
- Country: France
- Region: Occitania
- Department: Haute-Garonne
- Arrondissement: Toulouse
- Canton: Blagnac
- Intercommunality: Toulouse Métropole

Government
  - Mayor (2020–2026): Michel Beuillé
- Area^{1}: 13.76 km^{2} (5.31 sq mi)
- Elevation: 145 m (476 ft)
- Highest elevation: 171 m (561 ft)
- Lowest elevation: 119 m (390 ft)
- Population (2023): 7,997
  - Density: 581.2/km^{2} (1,505/sq mi)
- Time zone: UTC+01:00 (CET)
  - Summer (DST): UTC+02:00 (CEST)
- INSEE/Postal code: 31032 /31840
- ^{1} French Land Register data, which excludes lakes, ponds, glaciers > 1 km^{2} (0.386 sq mi or 247 acres) and river estuaries.

Aussonne (French pronunciation: [osɔn]; Occitan: Aussona) is a commune in the Haute-Garonne department in southwestern France.

== Population ==
Historical population
Year	Pop.	±% p.a.
1968	873	—
1975	1,952	+12.18%
1982	3,636	+9.29%
1990	4,000	+1.20%
1999	4,220	+0.60%
2007	5,556	+3.50%
2012	6,739	+3.94%
2017	6,984	+0.72%
2023	7,997	+2.28%
Source: INSEE

== Monument ==
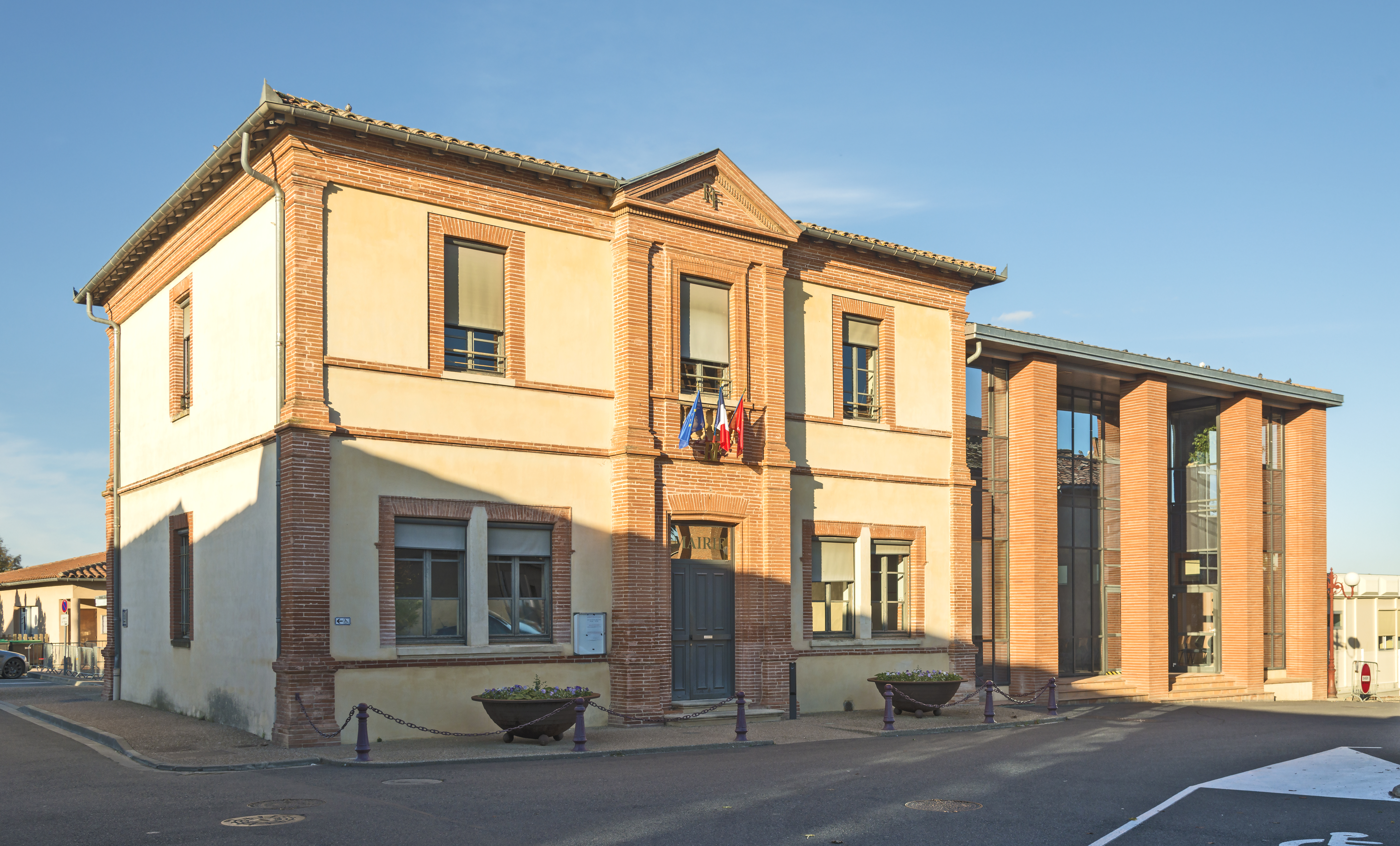
Town hall

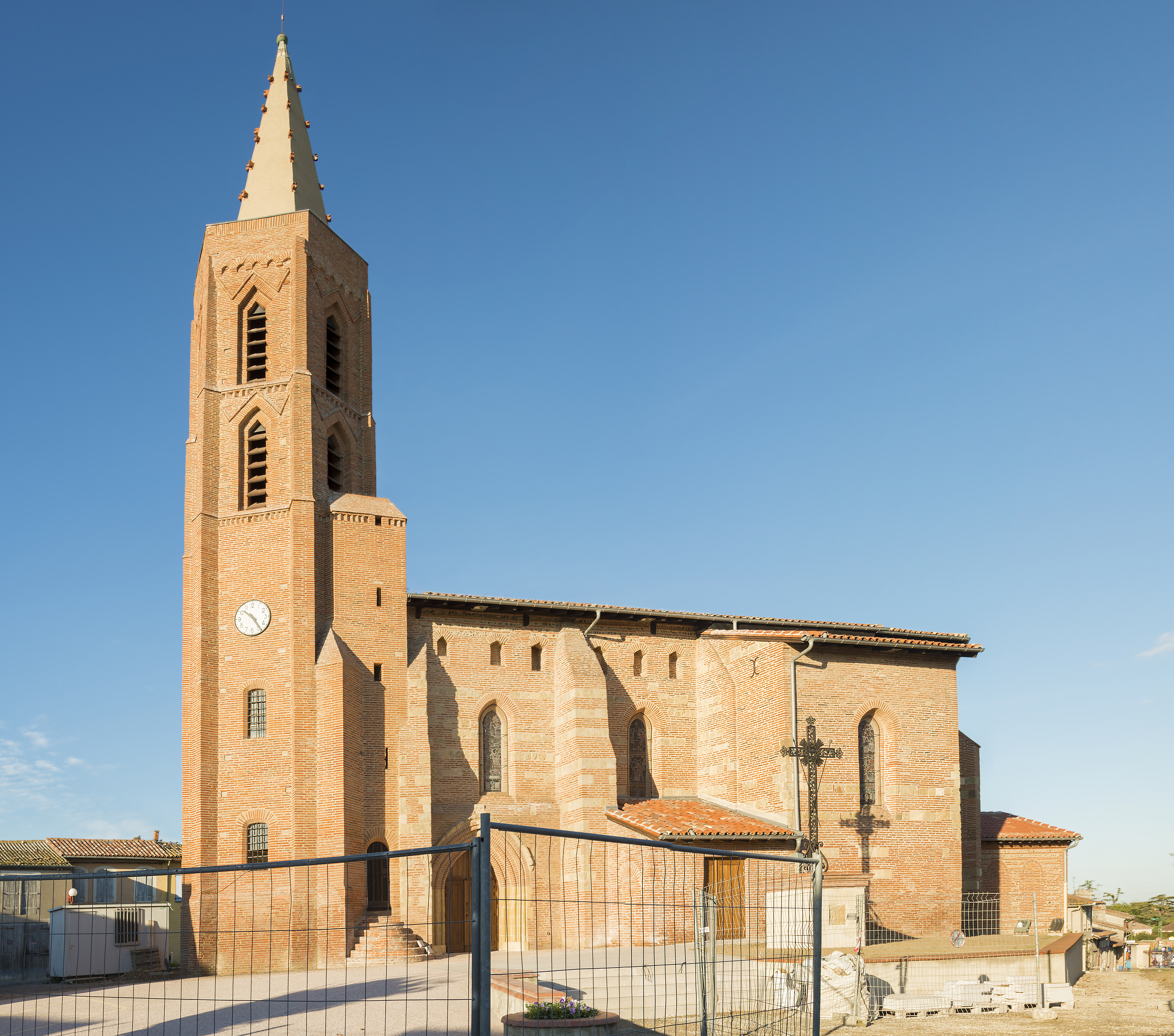
Church

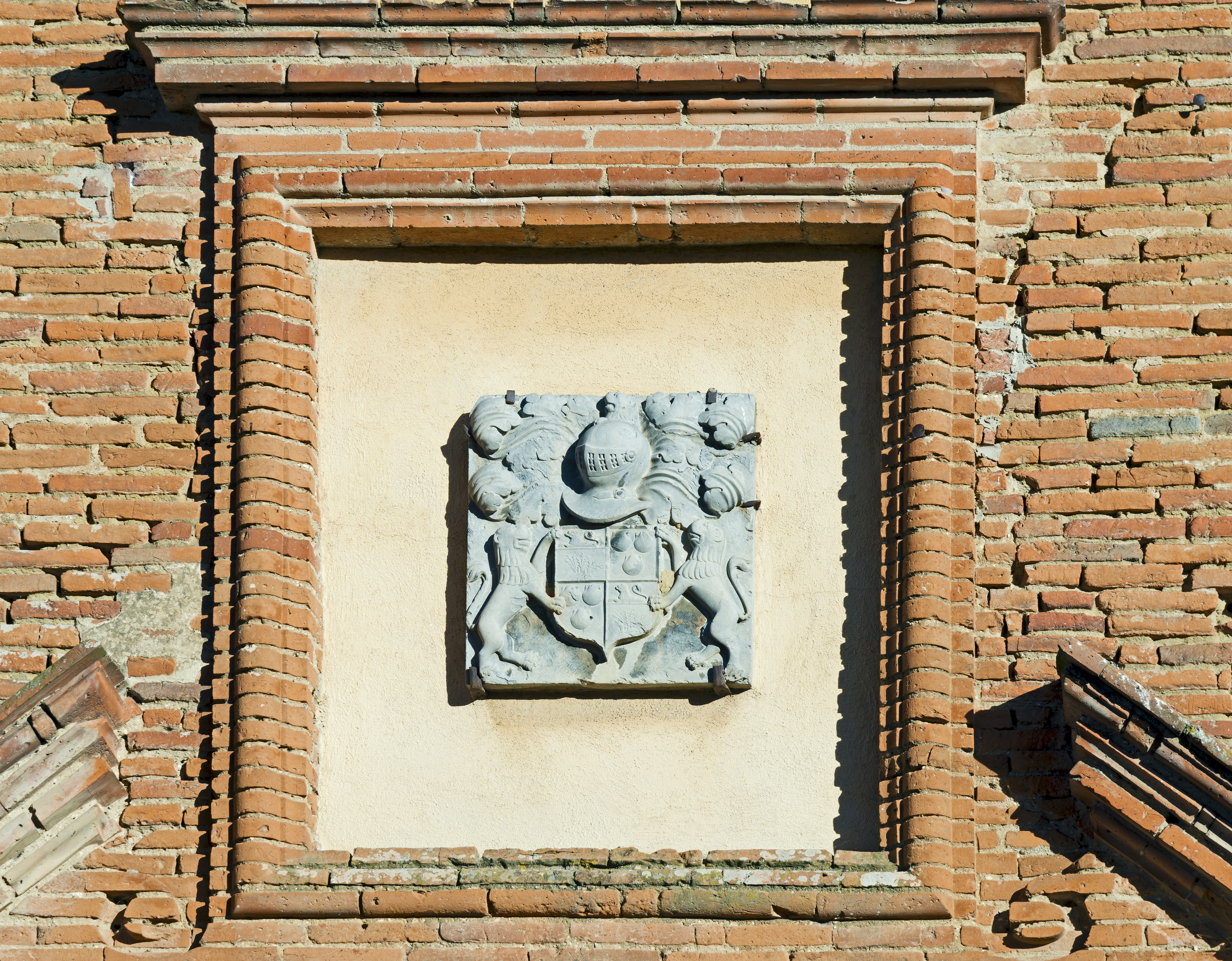
Arms in facade of castle

== See also ==
- Communes of the Haute-Garonne department
