= Mondonville, Haute-Garonne =

Mondonville
- Commune
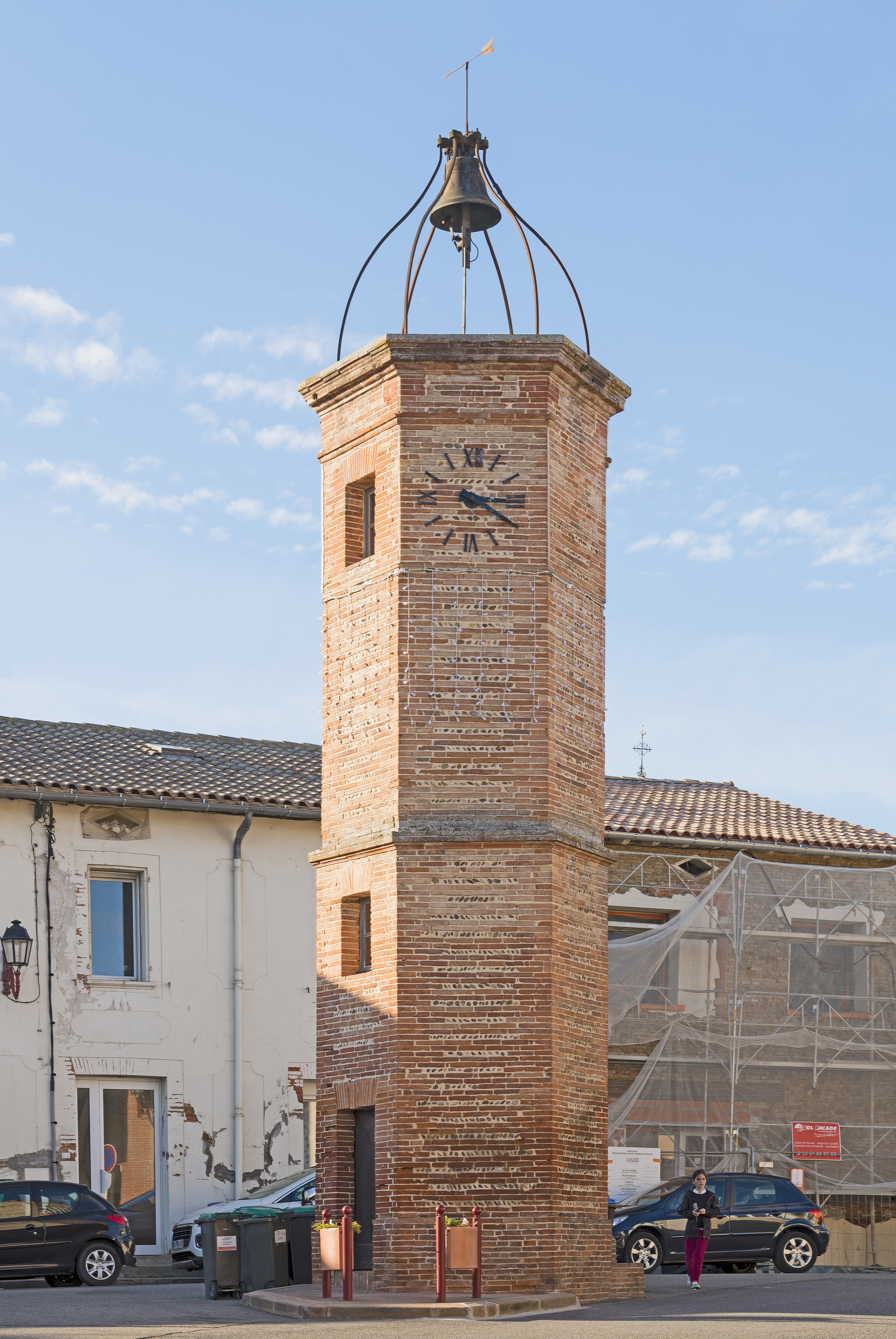
- The clock tower in Mondonville

- Coat of arms
- Location of Mondonville
- Location within France Location within Occitanie
- Coordinates: 43°40′19″N 1°17′18″E
- Country: France
- Region: Occitania
- Department: Haute-Garonne
- Arrondissement: Toulouse
- Canton: Blagnac
- Intercommunality: Toulouse Métropole

Government
  - Mayor (2020–2026): Véronique Barraqué Onno
- Area^{1}: 11.89 km^{2} (4.59 sq mi)
- Elevation: 150 m (490 ft)
- Highest elevation: 193 m (633 ft)
- Lowest elevation: 145 m (476 ft)
- Population (2023): 6,060
  - Density: 510/km^{2} (1,320/sq mi)
- Time zone: UTC+01:00 (CET)
  - Summer (DST): UTC+02:00 (CEST)
- INSEE/Postal code: 31351 /31700
- ^{1} French Land Register data, which excludes lakes, ponds, glaciers > 1 km^{2} (0.386 sq mi or 247 acres) and river estuaries.

Mondonville (French pronunciation: [mɔ̃dɔ̃vil]; Occitan: Mondonvila) is a commune in the French department of Haute-Garonne, Occitania, southwestern France.

== Population ==
Historical population
| Year | Pop. | ±% p.a. |
|---|---|---|
| 1968 | 643 | — |
| 1975 | 1,029 | +6.95% |
| 1982 | 1,245 | +2.76% |
| 1990 | 1,366 | +1.17% |
| 1999 | 1,900 | +3.73% |
| 2007 | 3,036 | +6.03% |
| 2012 | 4,601 | +8.67% |
| 2017 | 4,546 | −0.24% |
| 2023 | 6,060 | +4.91% |
Source: INSEE

== Monuments ==
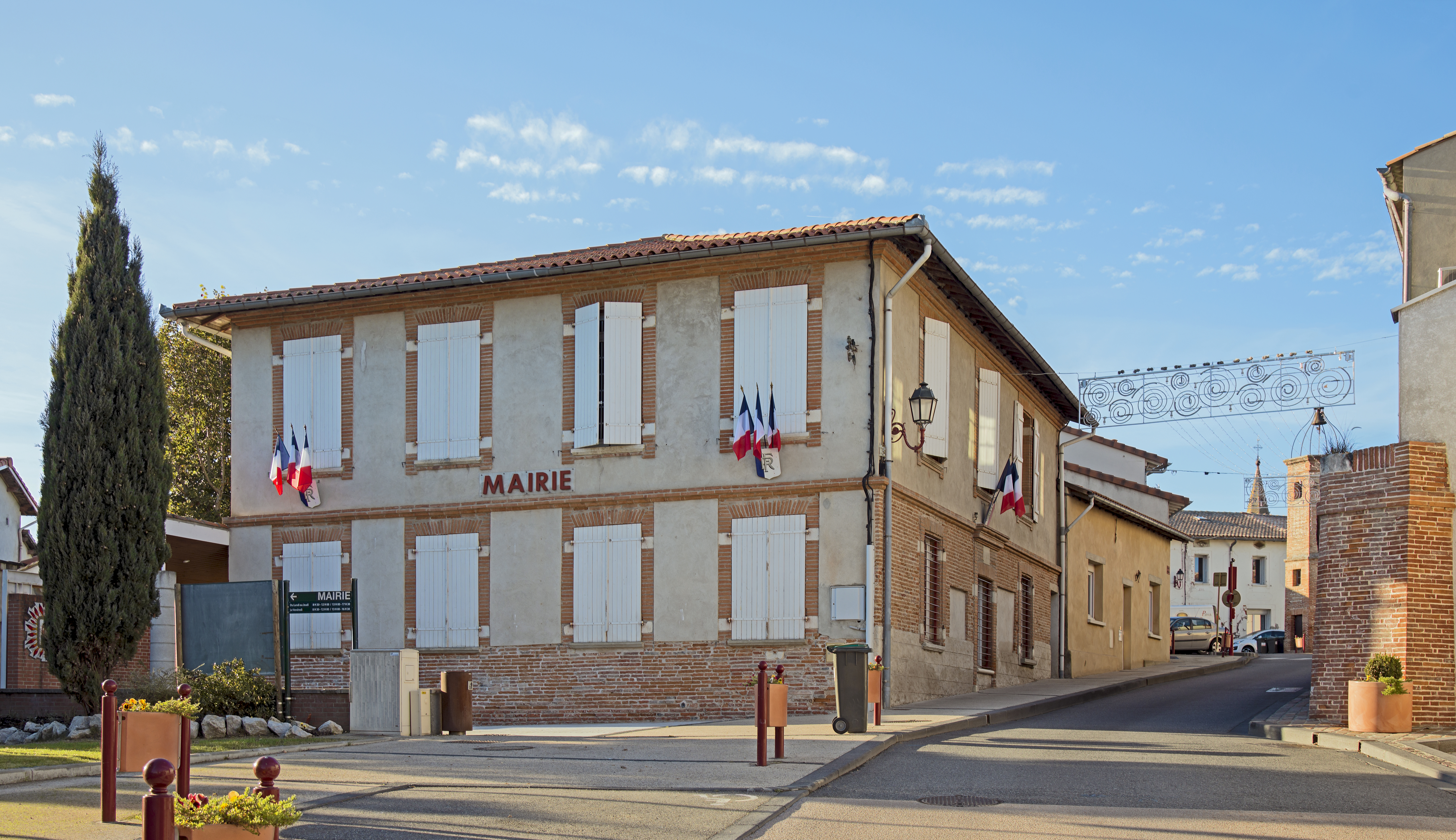
Town hall

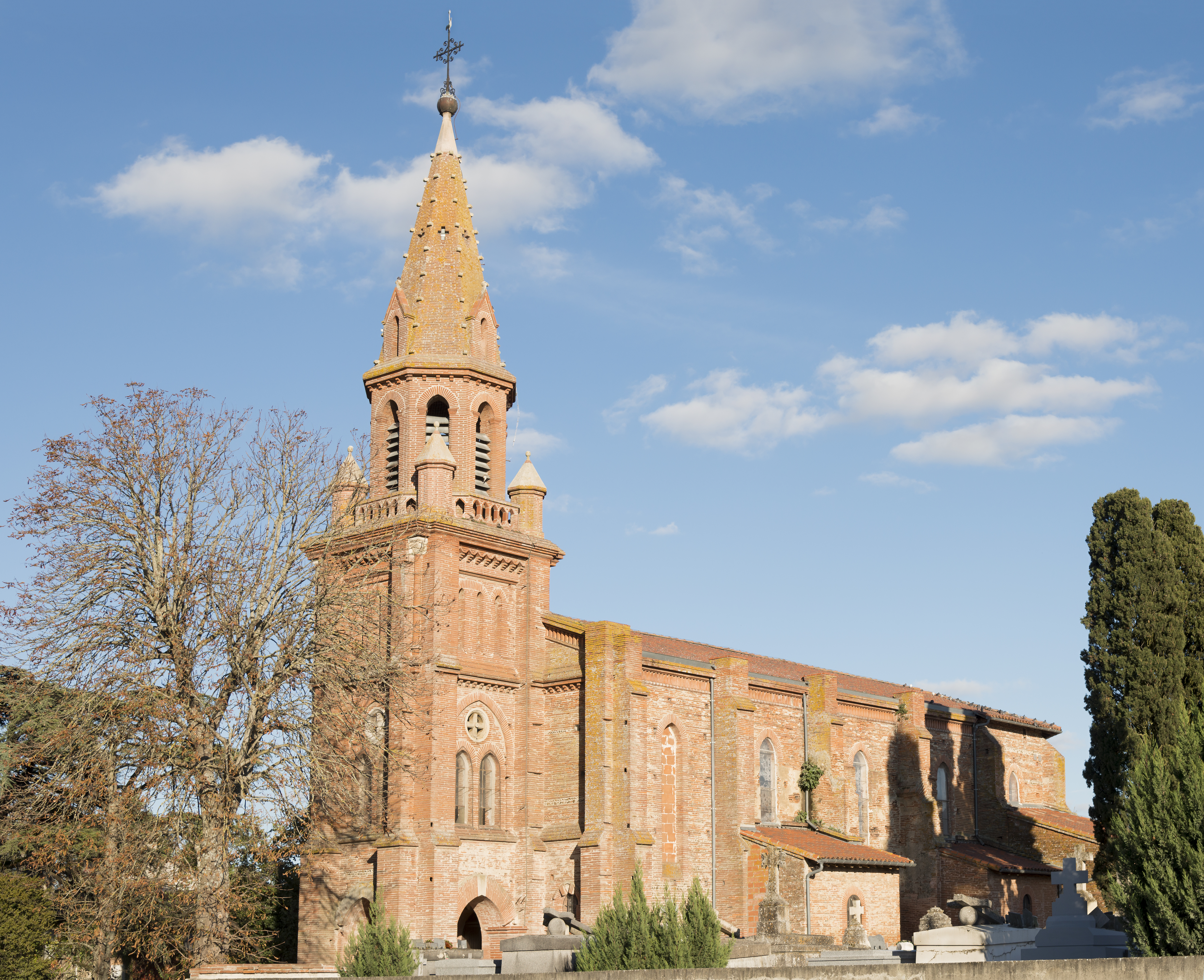
Church Saint-Pierre-ès-Lien

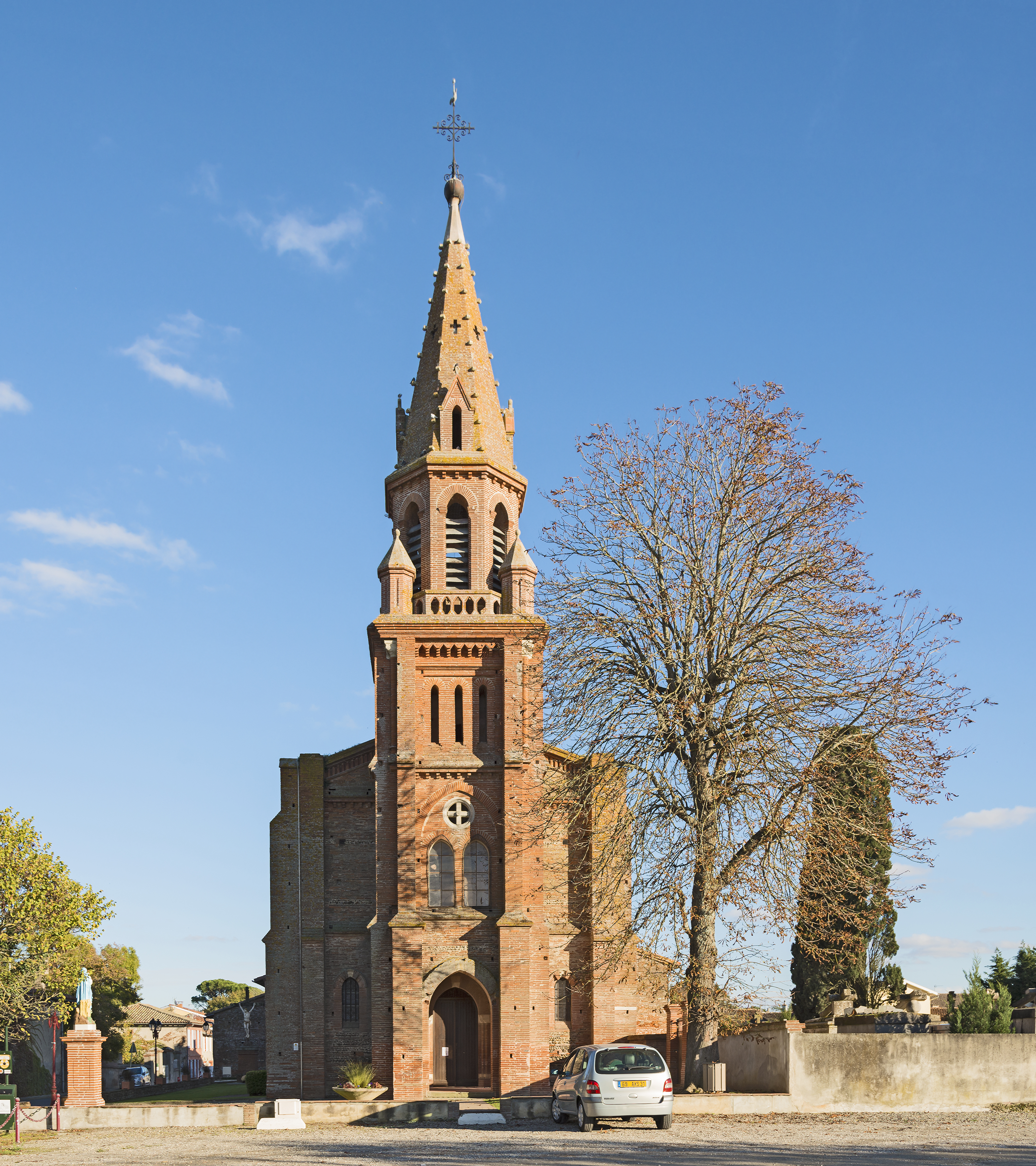
Facade

== See also ==
- Communes of the Haute-Garonne department
