= Château de Launac =

15th-century castle in Haute-Garonne, France

Coordinates: 43°44′37″N 1°10′49″E

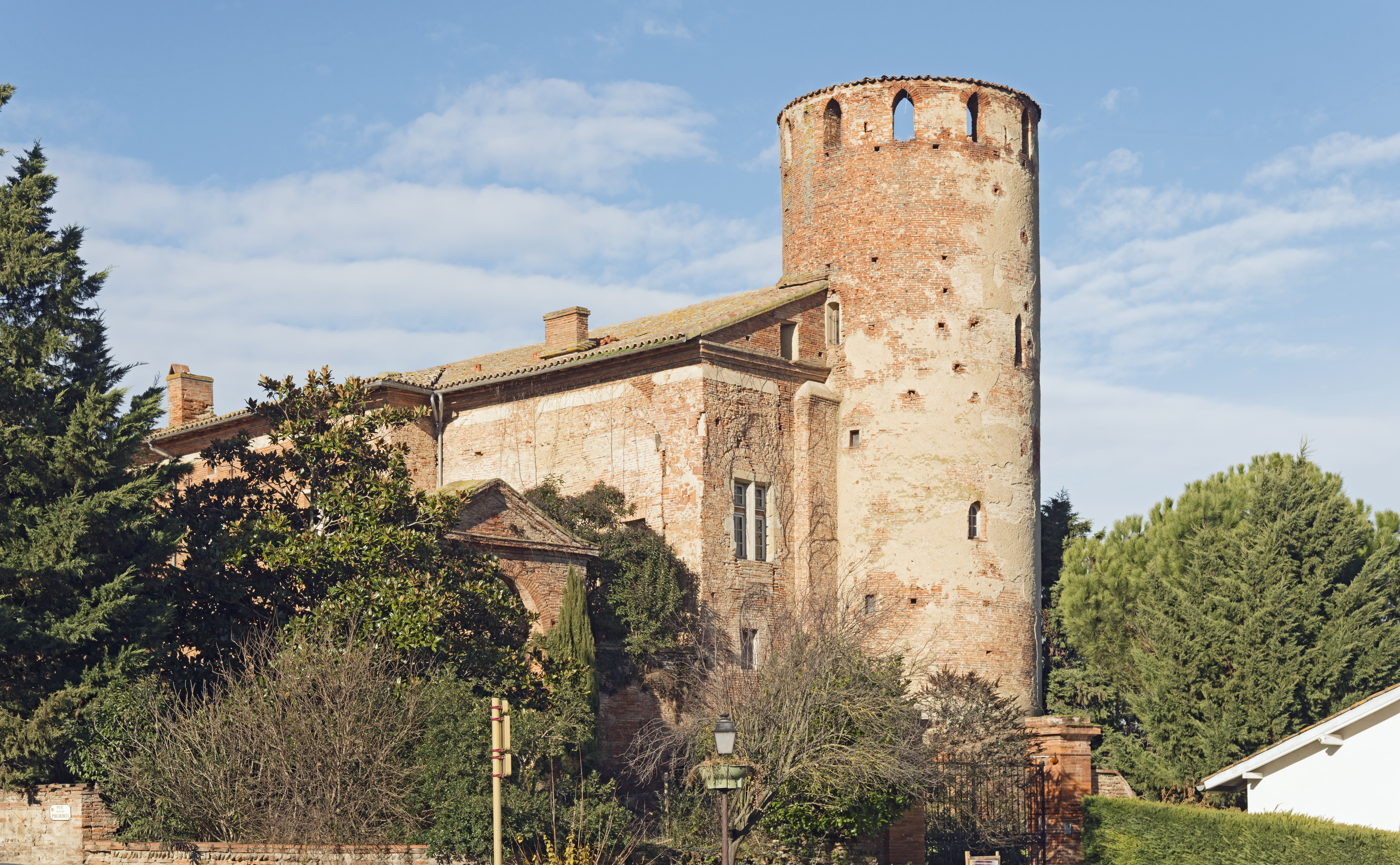
Château de Launac

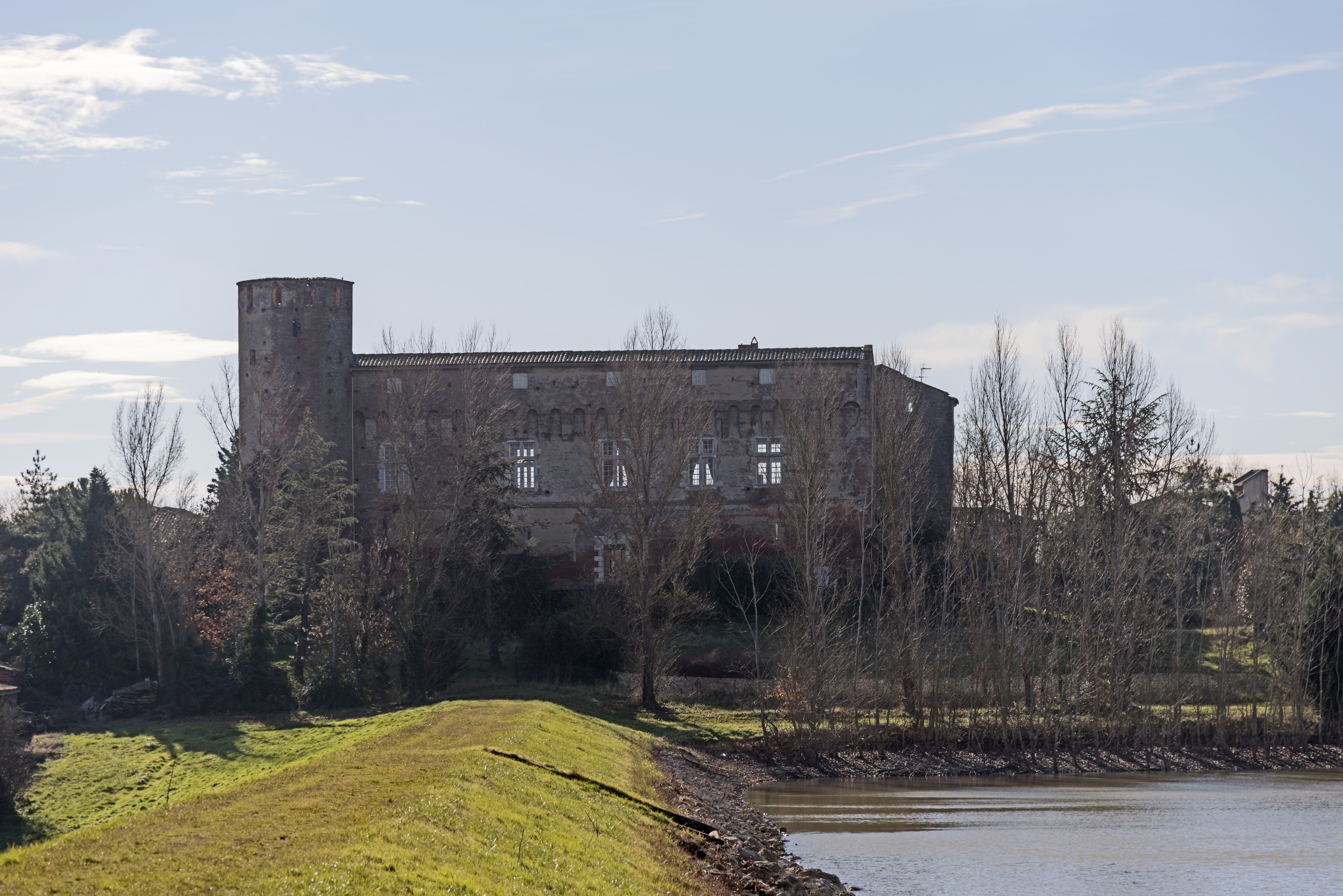
North exposure

The Château de Launac is a 15th-century castle in the commune of Launac in the Haute-Garonne département of France. Major additions and alterations were made in the 16th and 17th centuries. Privately owned, the upper floor and the corner tower have been listed since 1927 as a monument historique by the French Ministry of Culture. The rest of the castle was listed in 1991.

== See also ==
- List of castles in France
