= Launac =

- Commune
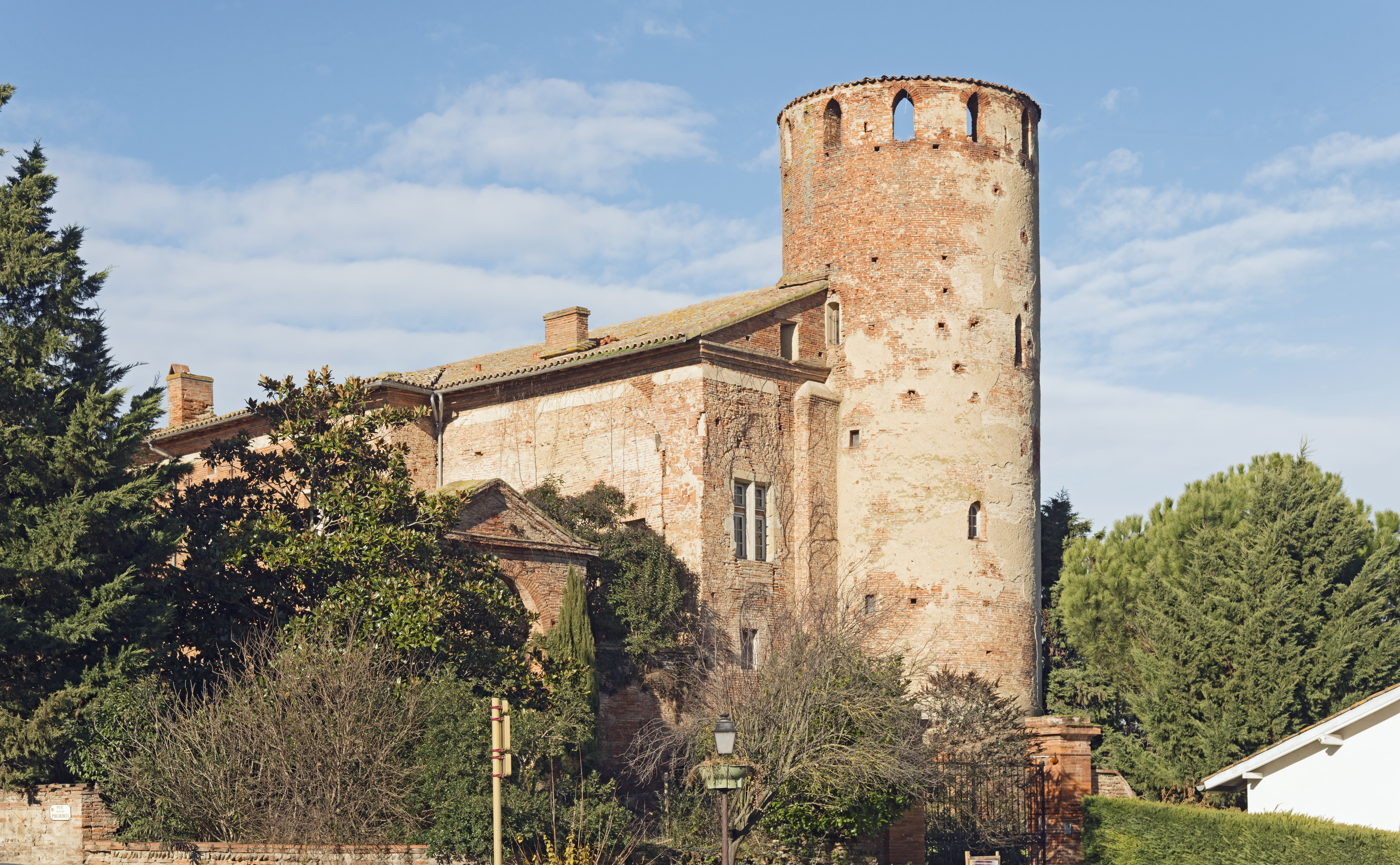
- The chateau in Launac
- Location of Launac
- Location within France Location within Occitanie
- Coordinates: 43°44′38″N 1°10′53″E
- Country: France
- Region: Occitania
- Department: Haute-Garonne
- Arrondissement: Toulouse
- Canton: Léguevin

Government
  - Mayor (2020–2026): Nicolas Alarcon
- Area^{1}: 22.32 km^{2} (8.62 sq mi)
- Elevation: 135 m (443 ft)
- Highest elevation: 253 m (830 ft)
- Lowest elevation: 139 m (456 ft)
- Population (2023): 1,335
  - Density: 59.81/km^{2} (154.9/sq mi)
- Time zone: UTC+01:00 (CET)
  - Summer (DST): UTC+02:00 (CEST)
- INSEE/Postal code: 31281 /31330
- ^{1} French Land Register data, which excludes lakes, ponds, glaciers > 1 km^{2} (0.386 sq mi or 247 acres) and river estuaries.

Launac (French pronunciation: [lonak]) is a commune in the Haute-Garonne department in southwestern France.

== Population ==
Historical population
Year	Pop.	±% p.a.
1968	516	—
1975	516	+0.00%
1982	626	+2.80%
1990	740	+2.11%
1999	963	+2.97%
2007	1,173	+2.50%
2012	1,313	+2.28%
2017	1,382	+1.03%
2023	1,335	−0.58%
Source: INSEE

== Sights ==
The Château de Launac is a 15th-century castle with additions and alterations from the 16th and 17th centuries. Privately owned, it is listed as a historic site by the French Ministry of Culture.

== Sights ==
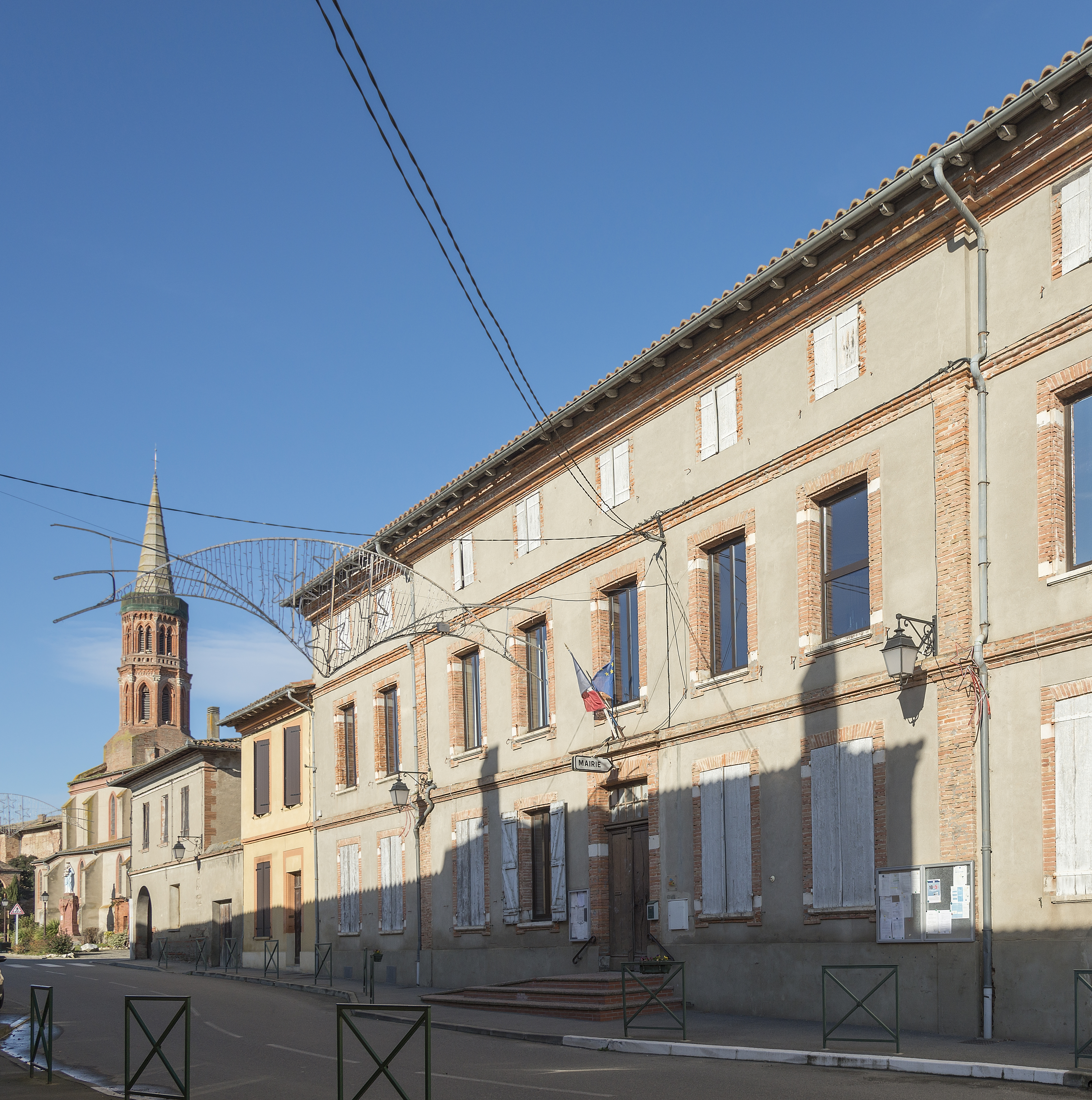
Town hall.

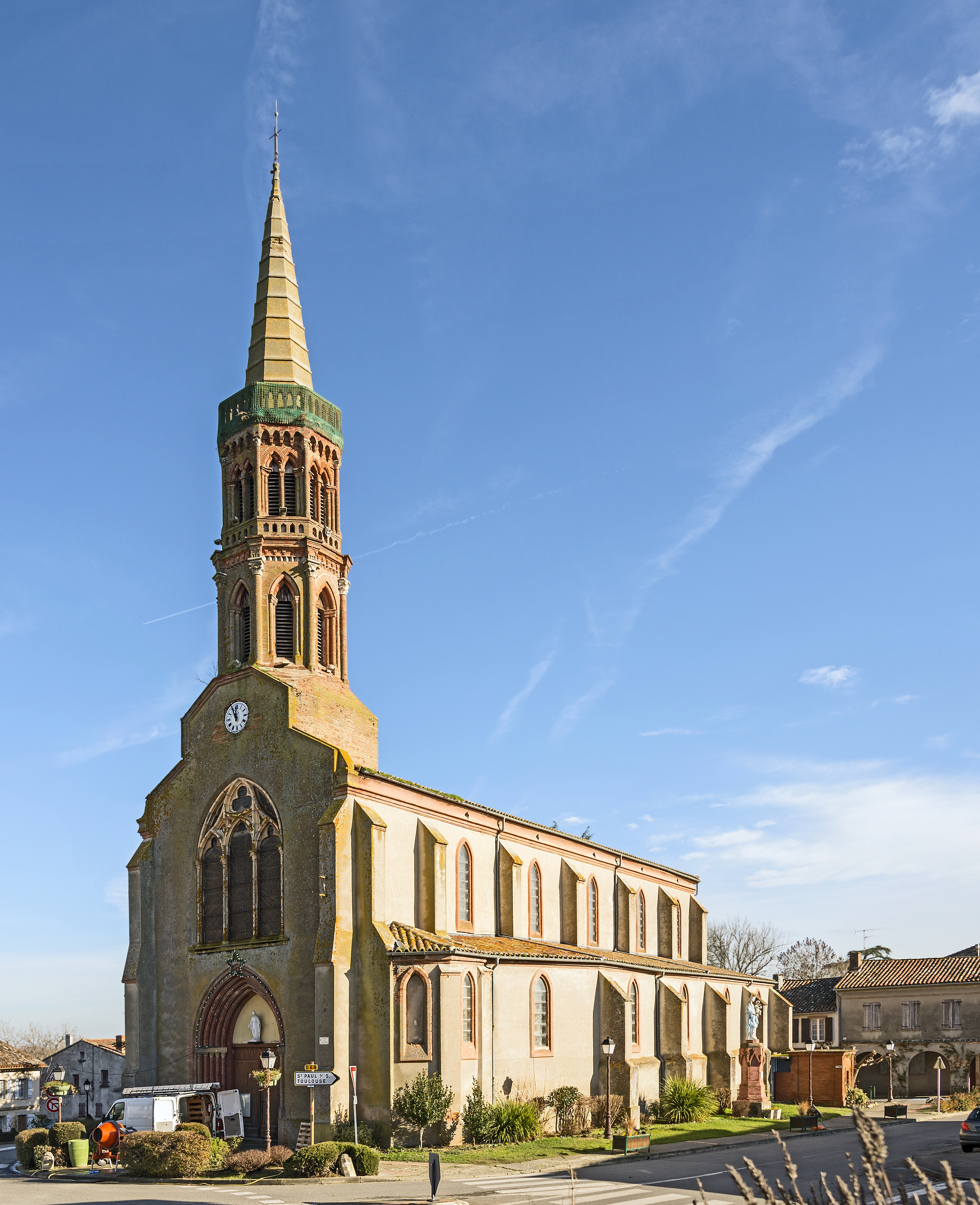
Church

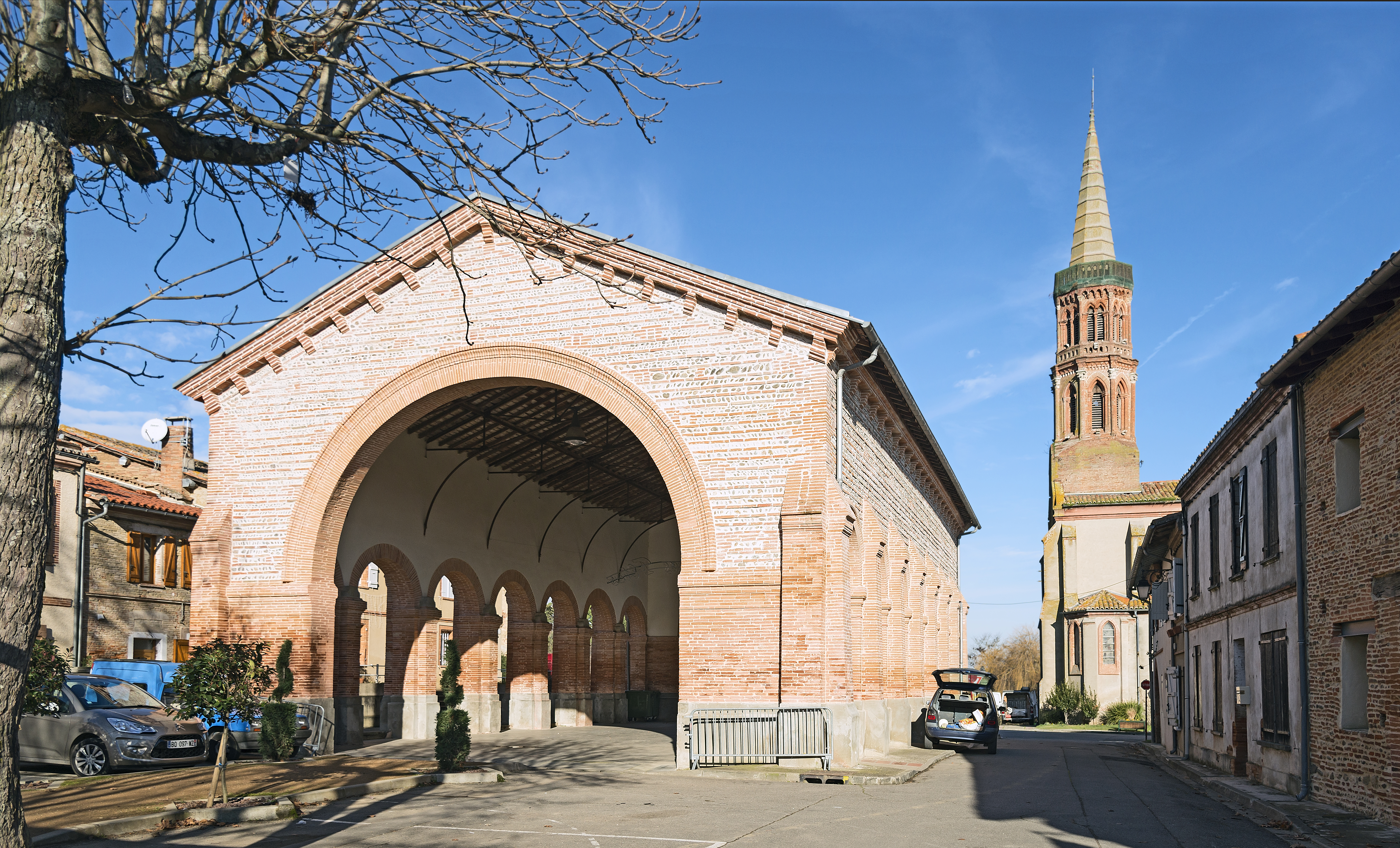
Covered market

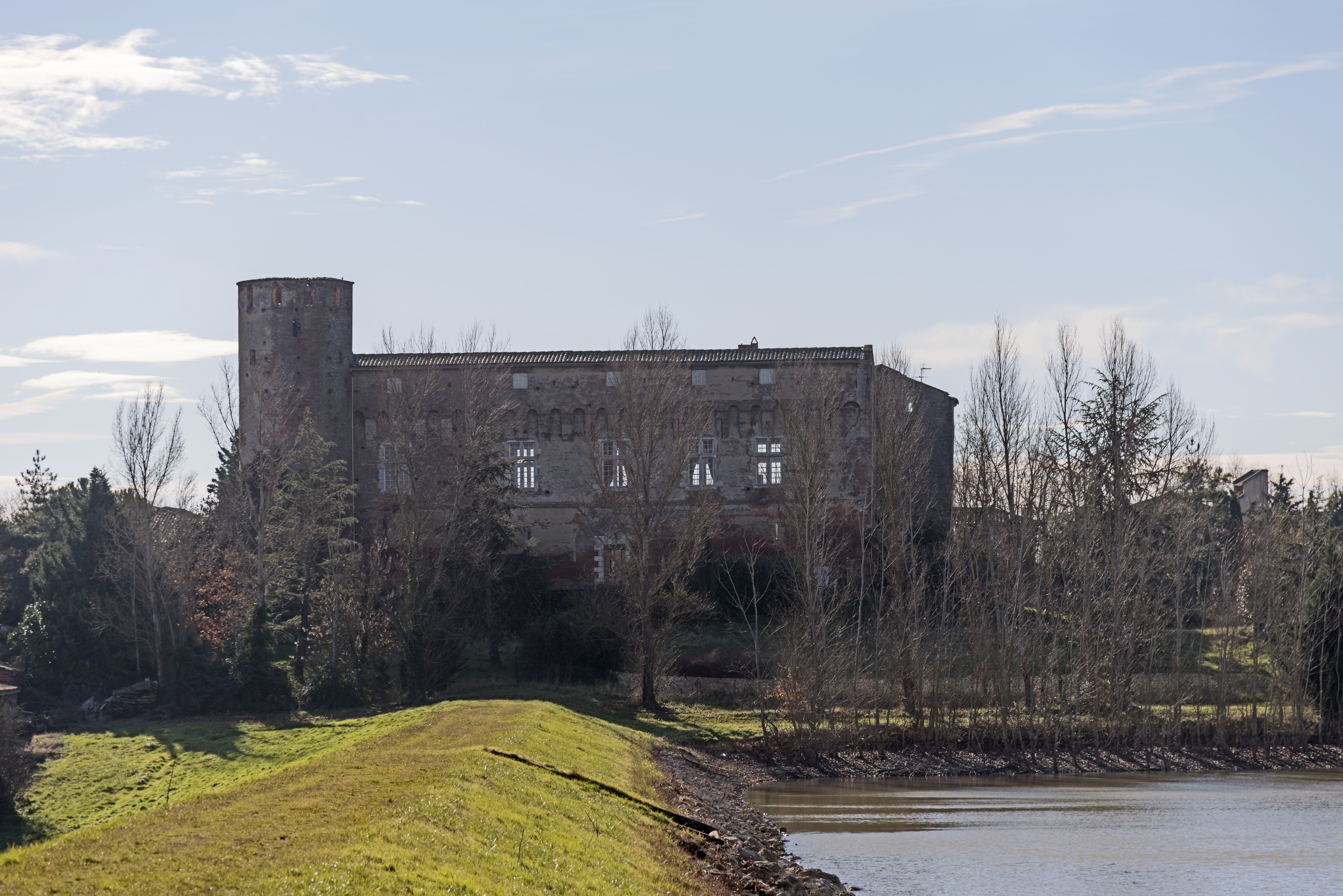
Castle

== See also ==
- Communes of the Haute-Garonne department
