= Château de Cambiac =

15th-century castle in Occitania, France

Coordinates: 43°29′22″N 1°47′27″E

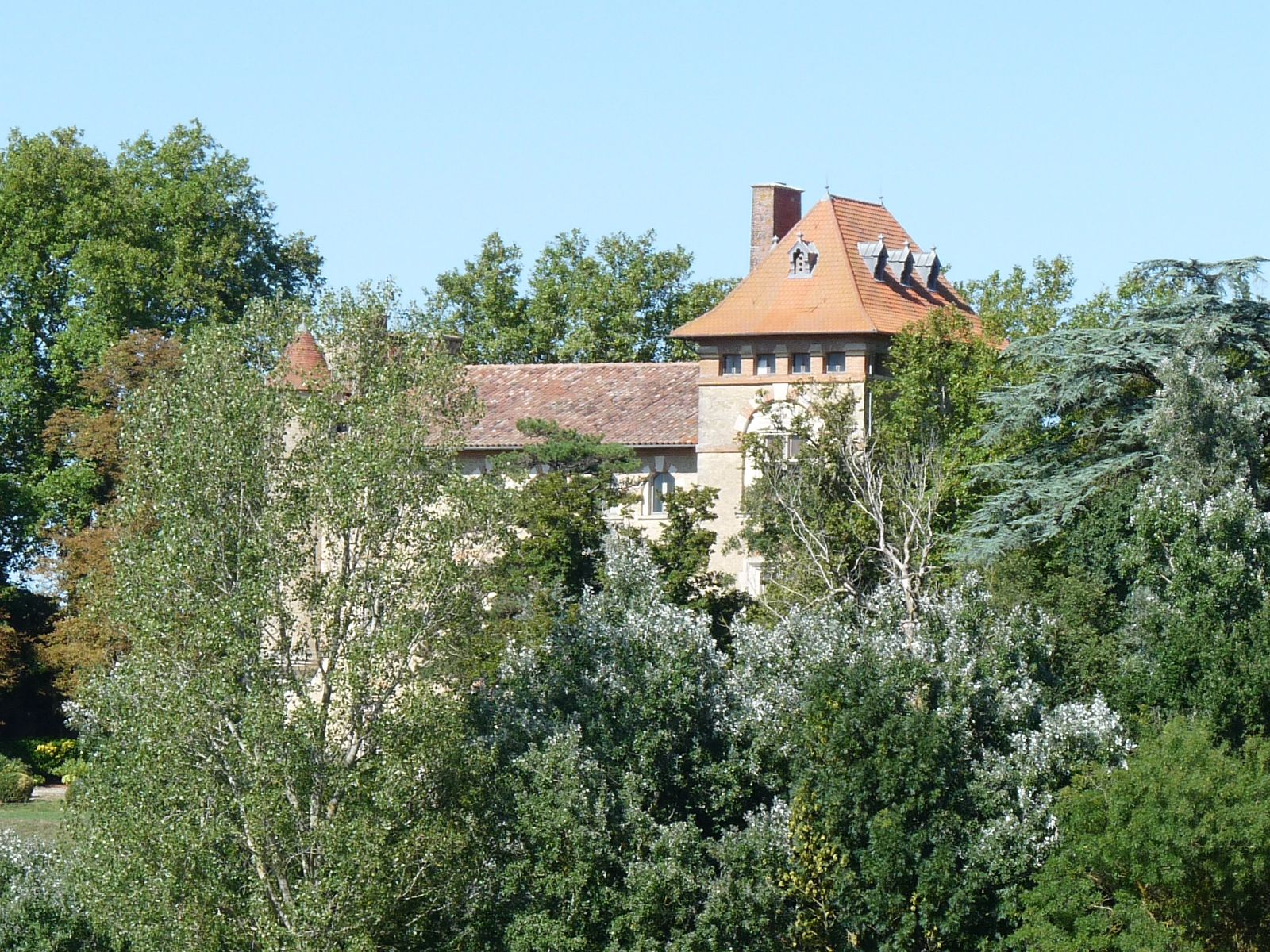
Cambiac castle, Haute-Garonne, France

The Château de Cambiac is a 15th-century castle in the commune of Cambiac in the Haute-Garonne département of France.

Originally a vast 15th century residence, it was probably constructed on the foundations of an earlier structure. It was given to the sieur Milhau, constable of Montauban, by Marguerite de Navarre.

At the end of the 19th century, massive restoration works gave the castle an extra floor and a pavilion. A Louis XII style was incorporated both inside and out.

Privately owned, it has been listed since 2001 as a monument historique by the French Ministry of Culture.

== See also ==
- List of castles in France
