= Cambiac =

- Commune
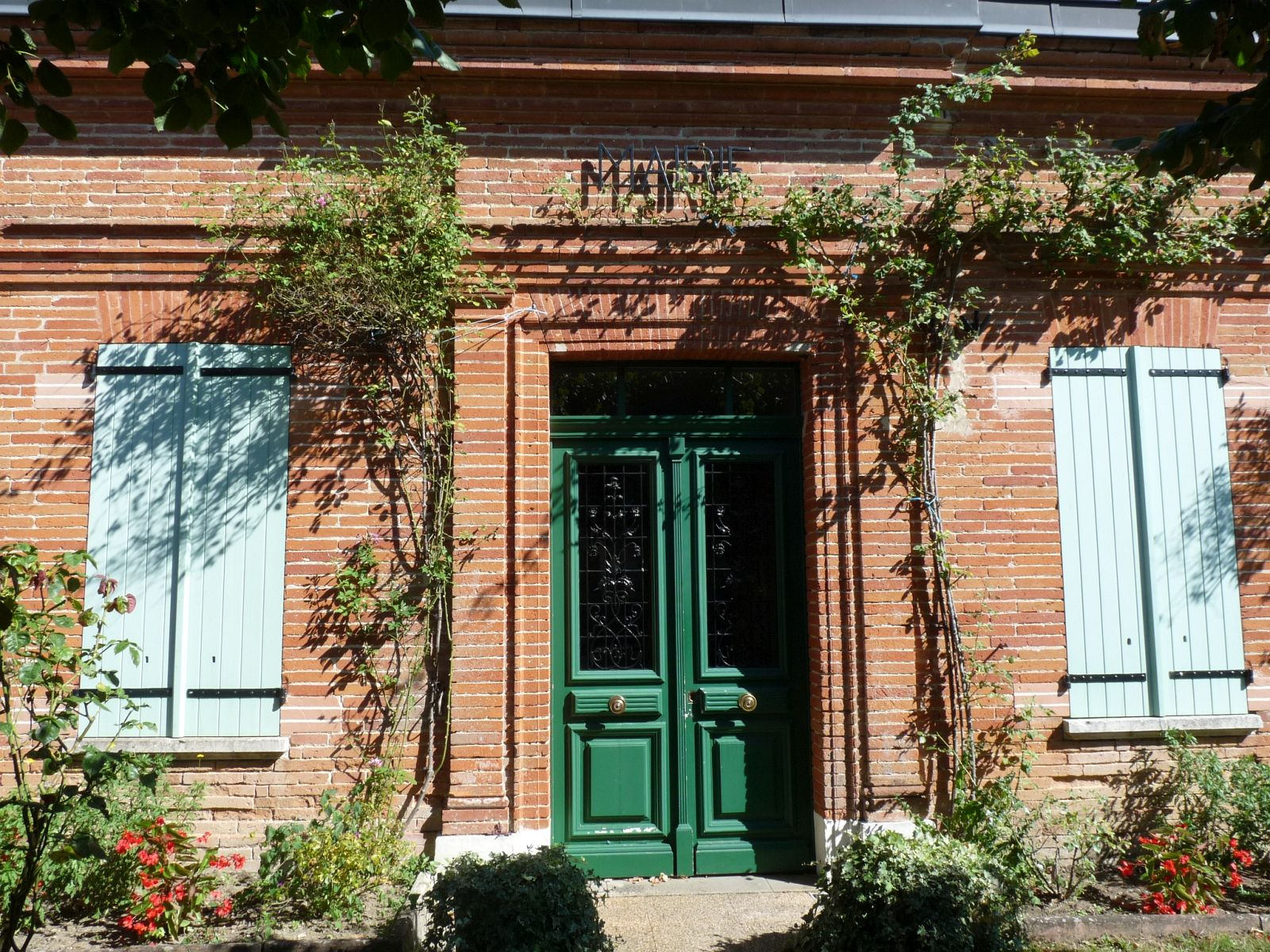
- The town hall in Cambiac
- Location of Cambiac
- Location within France Location within Occitanie
- Coordinates: 43°29′23″N 1°47′35″E
- Country: France
- Region: Occitania
- Department: Haute-Garonne
- Arrondissement: Toulouse
- Canton: Revel

Government
  - Mayor (2021–2026): Sophie Adroit
- Area^{1}: 7.74 km^{2} (2.99 sq mi)
- Elevation: 249 m (817 ft)
- Highest elevation: 261 m (856 ft)
- Lowest elevation: 195 m (640 ft)
- Population (2023): 236
  - Density: 30.5/km^{2} (79.0/sq mi)
- Time zone: UTC+01:00 (CET)
  - Summer (DST): UTC+02:00 (CEST)
- INSEE/Postal code: 31102 /31460
- ^{1} French Land Register data, which excludes lakes, ponds, glaciers > 1 km^{2} (0.386 sq mi or 247 acres) and river estuaries.

Cambiac (French pronunciation: [kɑ̃bjak]) is a village and commune in the Haute-Garonne department in southwestern France. It is best known for the castle which dominates the village.

== Geography ==
The commune is bordered by four other communes: Caraman to the northwest, Auriac-sur-Vendinelle to the northeast, Maurens to the southeast, and finally by Beauville to the southwest.

== Population ==
Historical population
Year	Pop.	±% p.a.
1968	139	—
1975	115	−2.67%
1982	149	+3.77%
1990	188	+2.95%
1999	170	−1.11%
2007	187	+1.20%
2012	226	+3.86%
2017	215	−0.99%
2023	236	+1.57%
Source: INSEE

== Sights ==
Originally a 15th-century castle, the privately owned castle Château de Cambiac has been much altered and is listed as a historic site by the French Ministry of Culture in 2001.

== See also ==
- Communes of the Haute-Garonne department
