= Vallègue =

- Commune
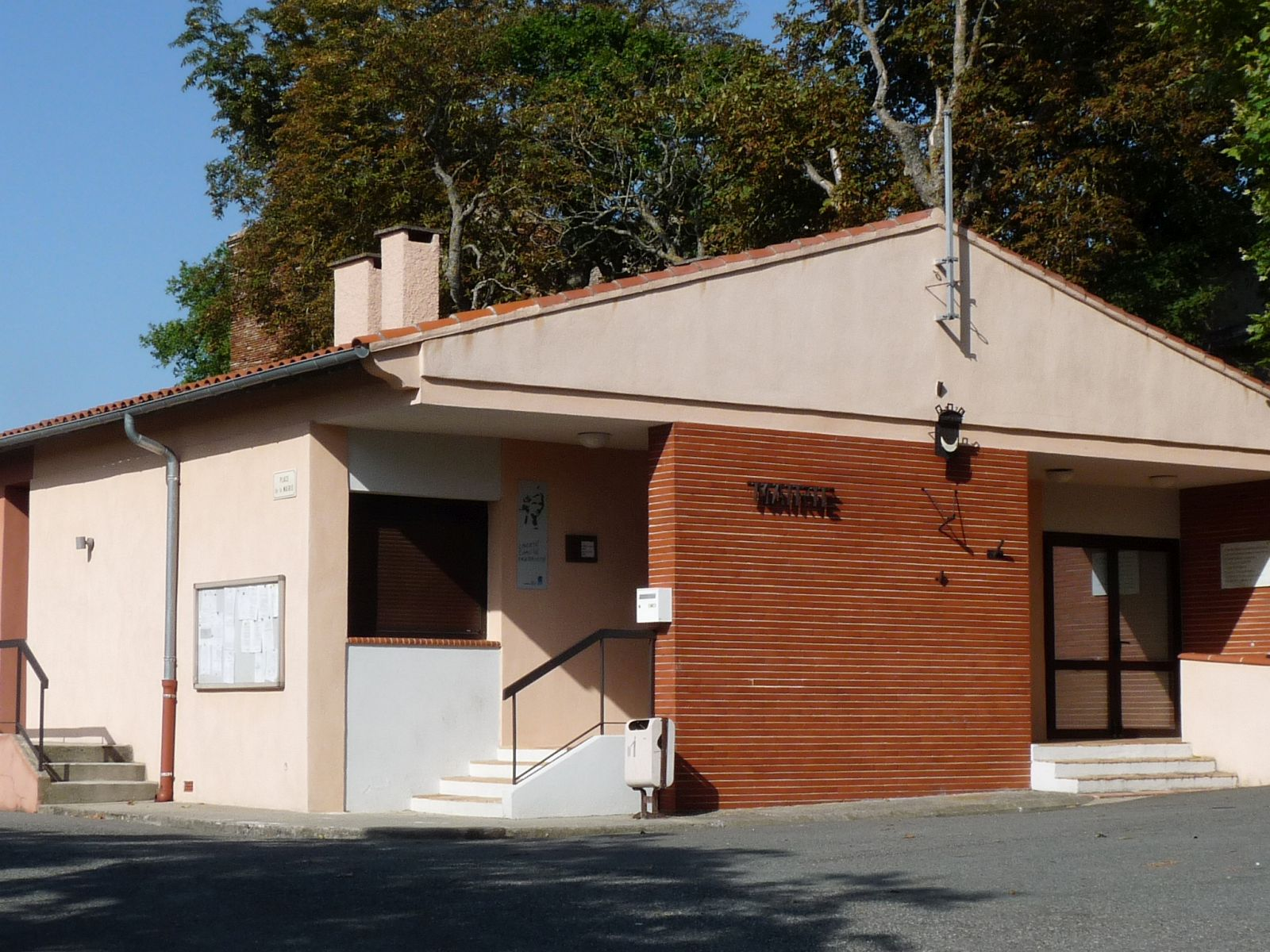
- The town hall in Vallègue

- Coat of arms
- Location of Vallègue
- Location within France Location within Occitanie
- Coordinates: 43°25′31″N 1°45′18″E
- Country: France
- Region: Occitania
- Department: Haute-Garonne
- Arrondissement: Toulouse
- Canton: Revel

Government
  - Mayor (2020–2026): Rémy Zanatta
- Area^{1}: 4.18 km^{2} (1.61 sq mi)
- Elevation: 243 m (797 ft)
- Highest elevation: 261 m (856 ft)
- Lowest elevation: 197 m (646 ft)
- Population (2023): 509
  - Density: 122/km^{2} (315/sq mi)
- Time zone: UTC+01:00 (CET)
  - Summer (DST): UTC+02:00 (CEST)
- INSEE/Postal code: 31566 /31290
- ^{1} French Land Register data, which excludes lakes, ponds, glaciers > 1 km^{2} (0.386 sq mi or 247 acres) and river estuaries.

Vallègue (French pronunciation: [valɛɡ]; Occitan: Valèga) is a commune in the Haute-Garonne department in southwestern France.

== Population ==
Historical population
Year	Pop.	±% p.a.
1968	164	—
1975	192	+2.28%
1982	244	+3.48%
1990	267	+1.13%
1999	383	+4.09%
2007	456	+2.20%
2012	529	+3.01%
2017	524	−0.19%
2023	509	−0.48%
Source: INSEE

== Sights ==
The Château de Vallègue is a mediaeval castle which is listed as a historic site by the French Ministry of Culture.

== See also ==
- Communes of the Haute-Garonne department
