= Château de Vallègue =

Castle in Haute-Garonne, Occitania, France

Coordinates: 43°25′28″N 1°45′16″E

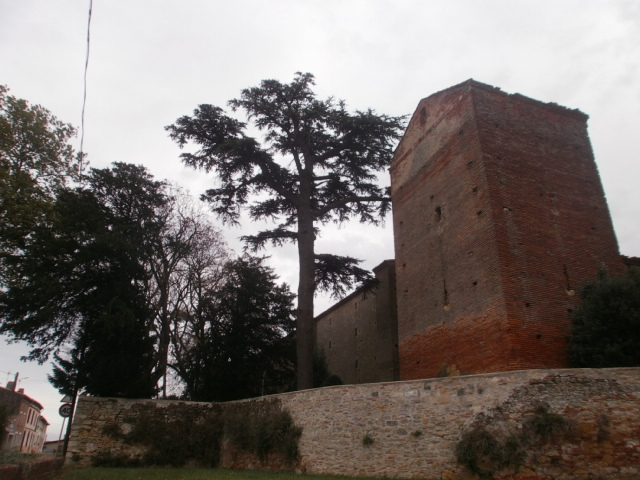
Château de Vallègue

The Château de Vallègue is a mediaeval castle in the commune of Vallègue in the Haute-Garonne département of France. The castle is the best preserved part of the ancient fortified village, mentioned since 1273 as a royal possession. It was sold several times during the 19th century. Containing disparate elements from different epochs, it owes its unity to the long north façade. The protected parts of the building are the walls (both outside and in), the roofs, the mediaeval vaulted cellar and grain stores. Privately owned, it has been listed since 2003 as a monument historique by the French Ministry of Culture.

== See also ==
- List of castles in France
