= Prunet, Haute-Garonne =

Prunet
- Commune
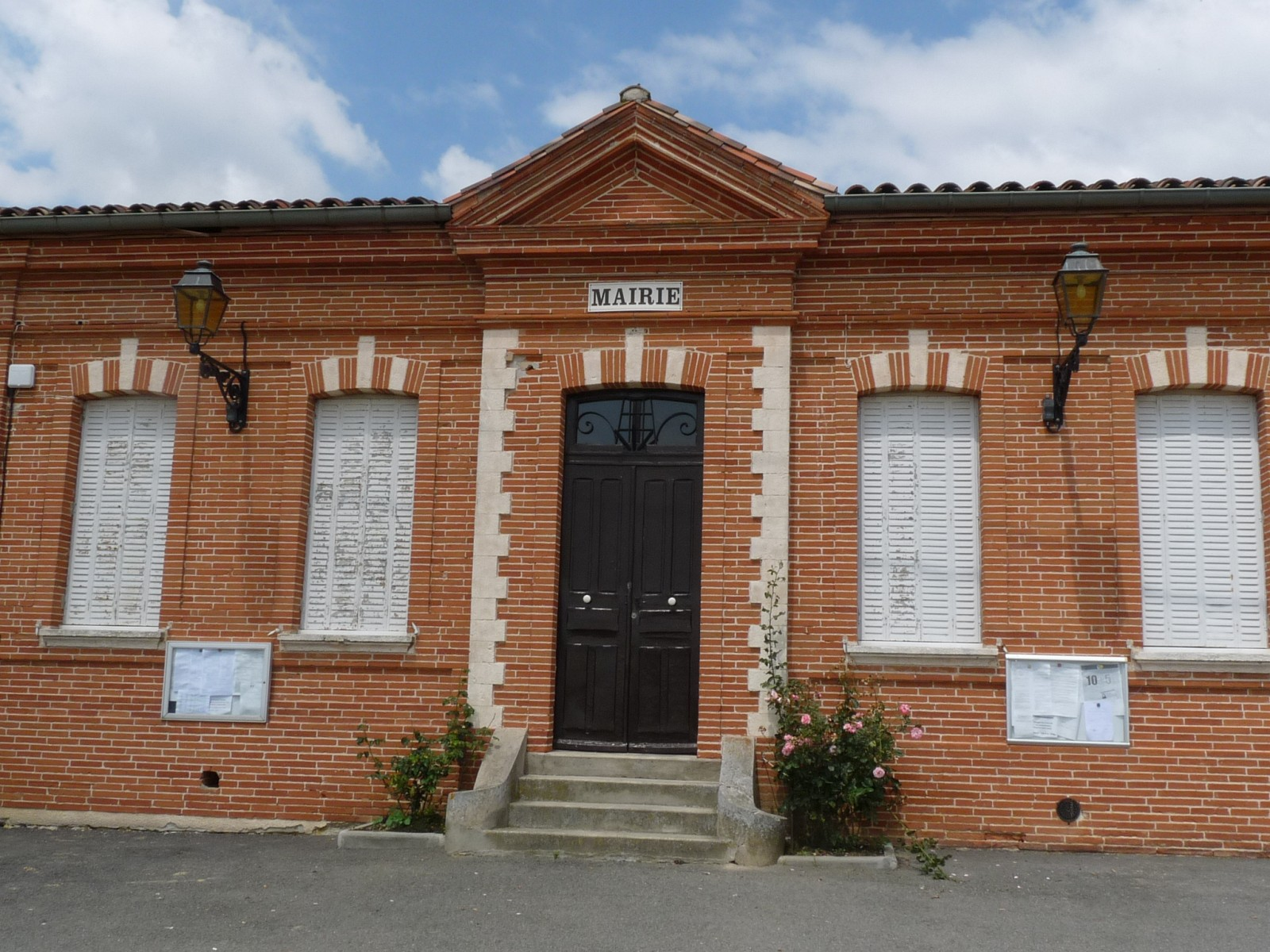
- The town hall in Prunet
- Location of Prunet
- Location within France Location within Occitanie
- Coordinates: 43°34′09″N 1°43′53″E
- Country: France
- Region: Occitania
- Department: Haute-Garonne
- Arrondissement: Toulouse
- Canton: Revel

Government
  - Mayor (2020–2026): Roger Bourgarel
- Area^{1}: 4.66 km^{2} (1.80 sq mi)
- Elevation: 263 m (863 ft)
- Highest elevation: 275 m (902 ft)
- Lowest elevation: 190 m (620 ft)
- Population (2023): 153
  - Density: 32.8/km^{2} (85.0/sq mi)
- Time zone: UTC+01:00 (CET)
  - Summer (DST): UTC+02:00 (CEST)
- INSEE/Postal code: 31441 /31460
- ^{1} French Land Register data, which excludes lakes, ponds, glaciers > 1 km^{2} (0.386 sq mi or 247 acres) and river estuaries.

Prunet (French pronunciation: [pʁynɛ]) is a commune in the Haute-Garonne department in southwestern France.

== Population ==
Historical population
Year	Pop.	±% p.a.
1968	87	—
1975	83	−0.67%
1982	80	−0.52%
1990	111	+4.18%
1999	134	+2.11%
2007	145	+0.99%
2012	142	−0.42%
2017	150	+1.10%
2023	153	+0.33%
Source: INSEE

== See also ==
- Communes of the Haute-Garonne department
