= Toulouse =

Prefecture and commune in France

Toulouse Tolosa (Occitan)
- Prefecture and commune
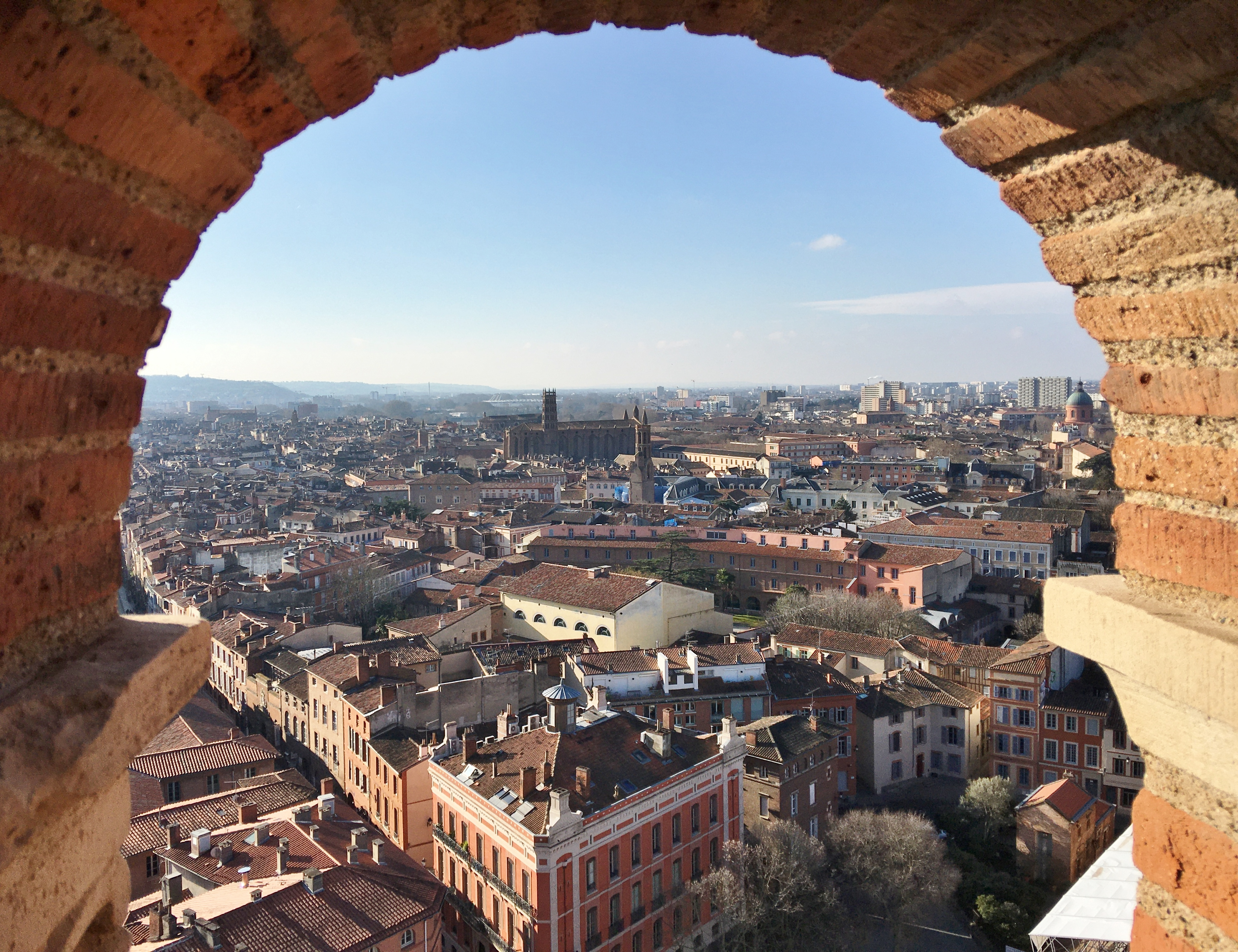
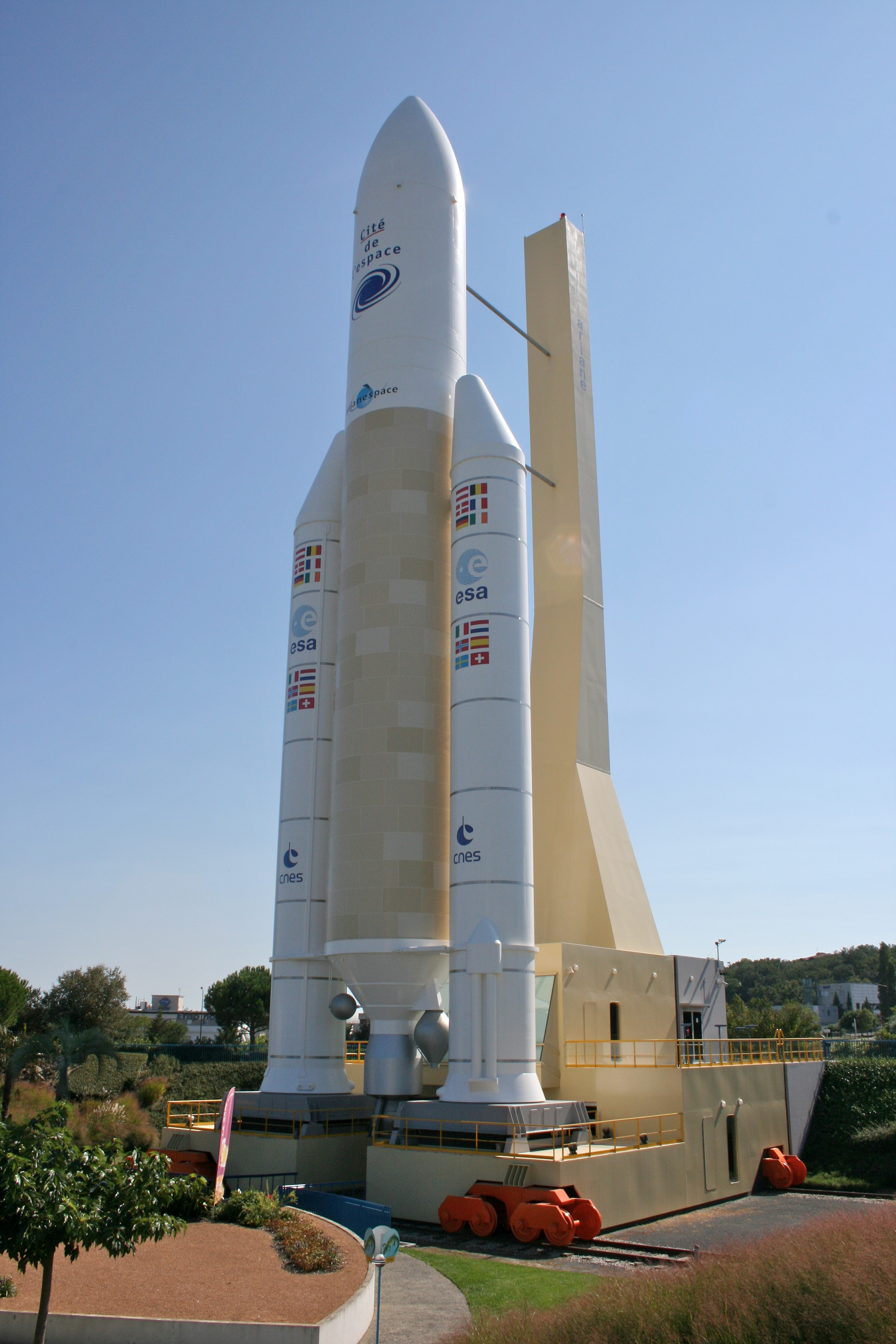
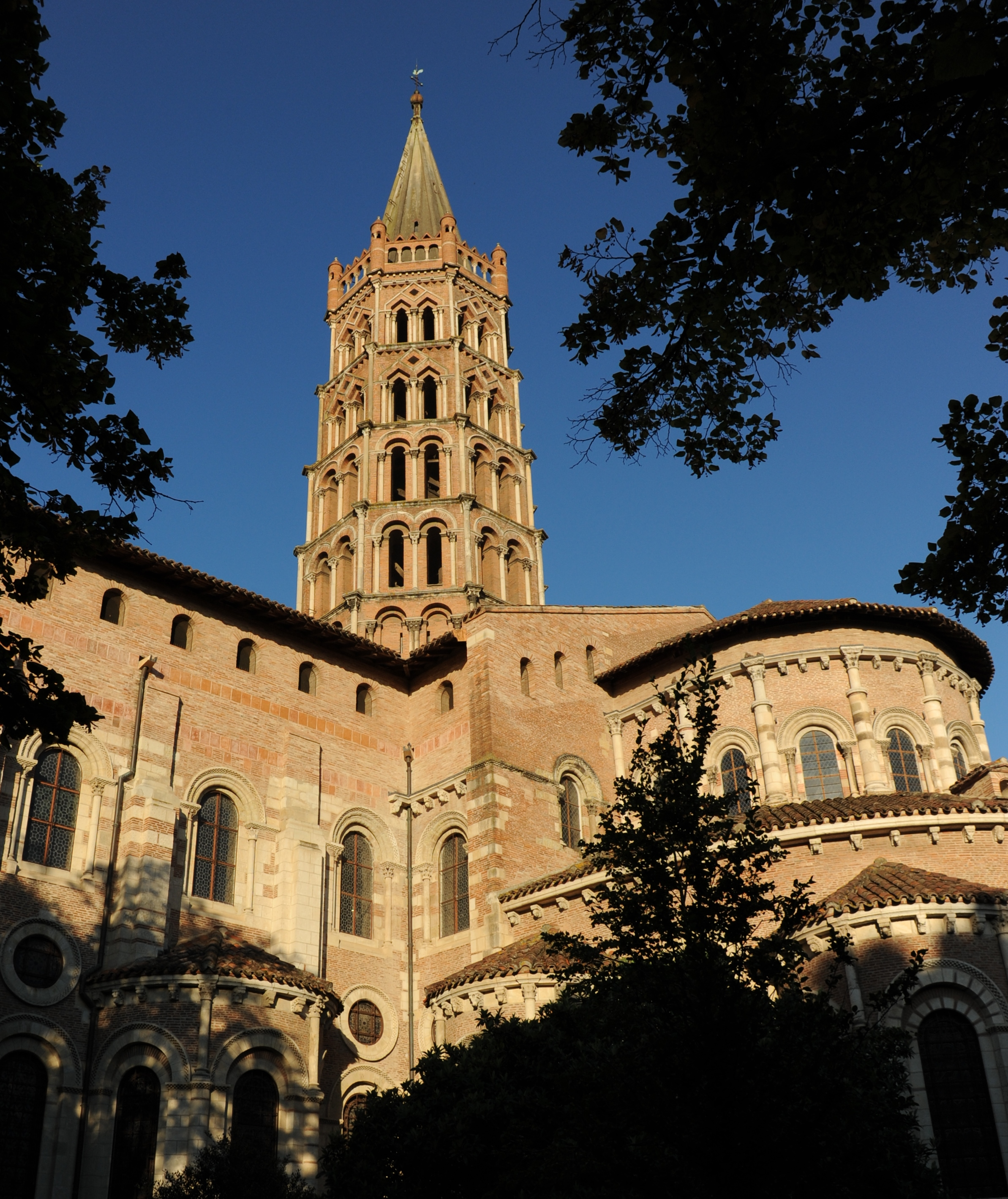
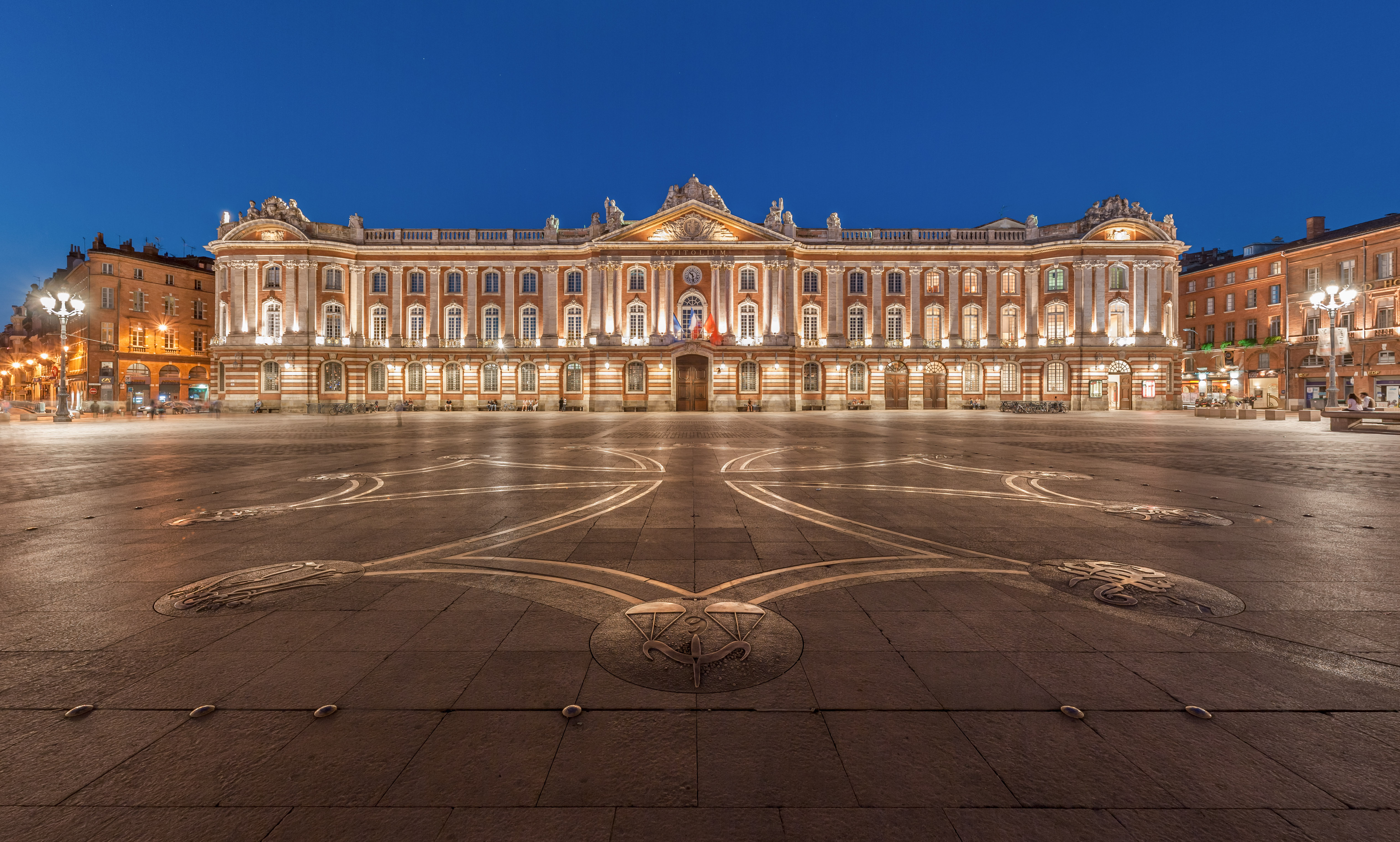
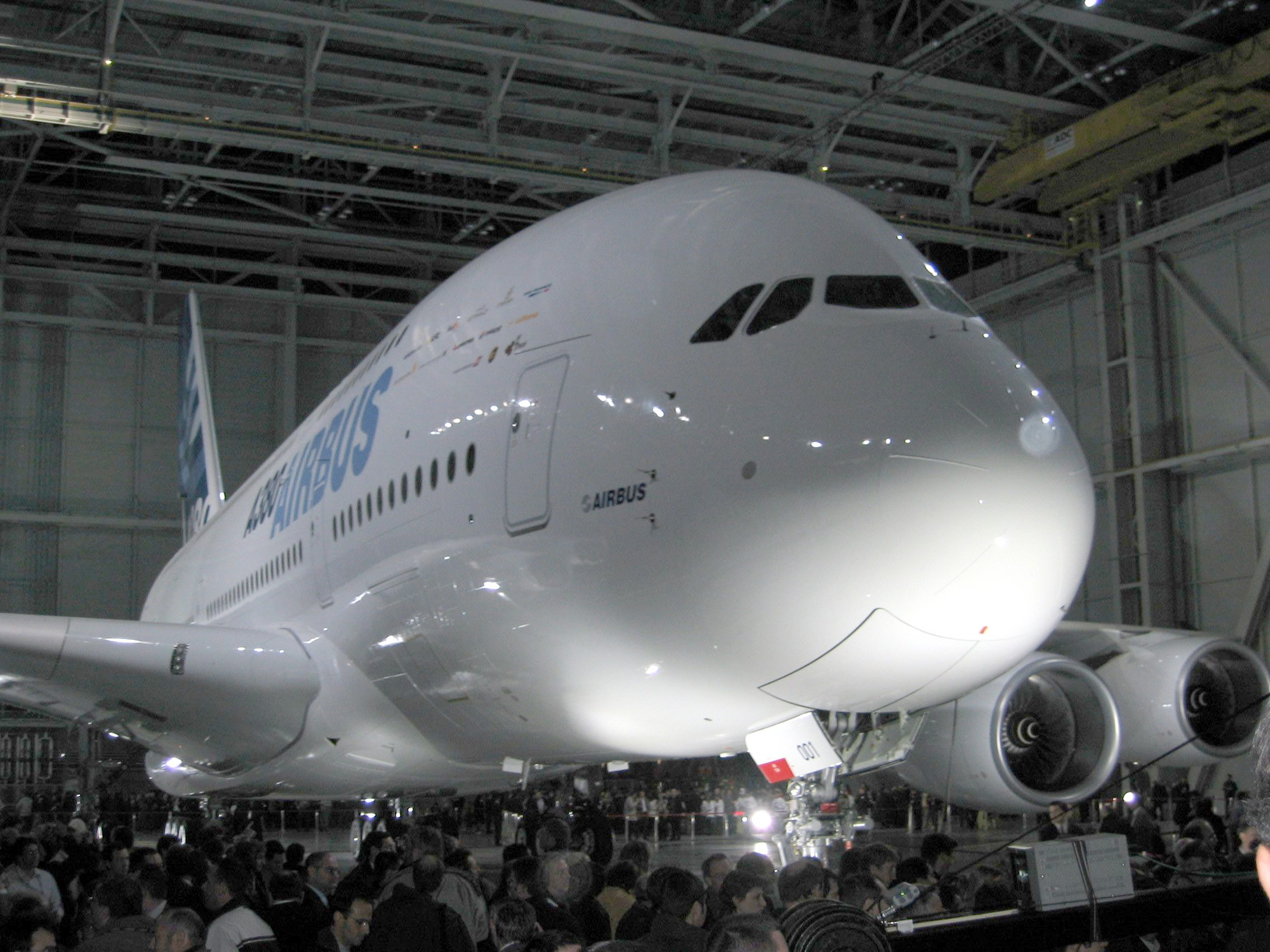
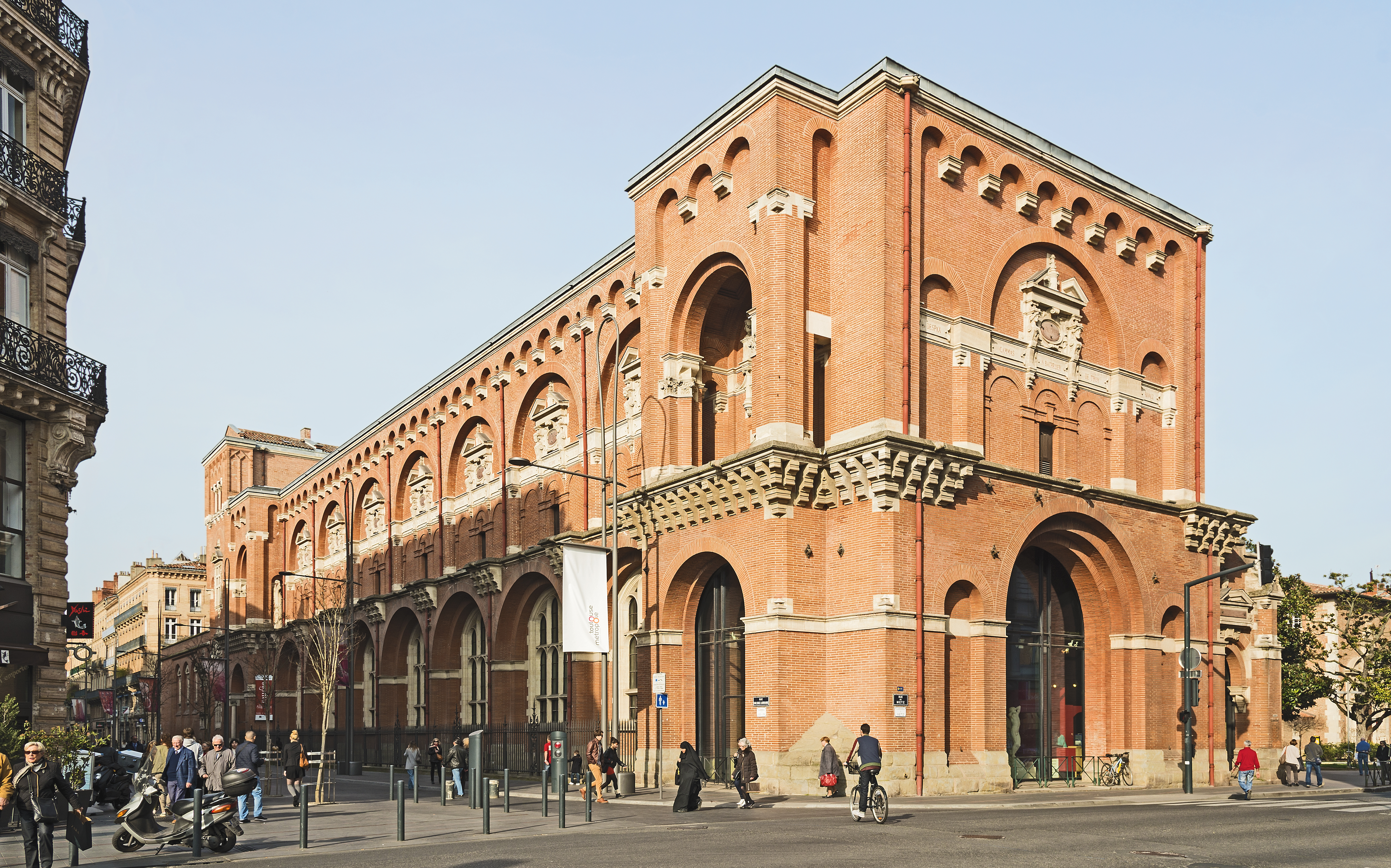
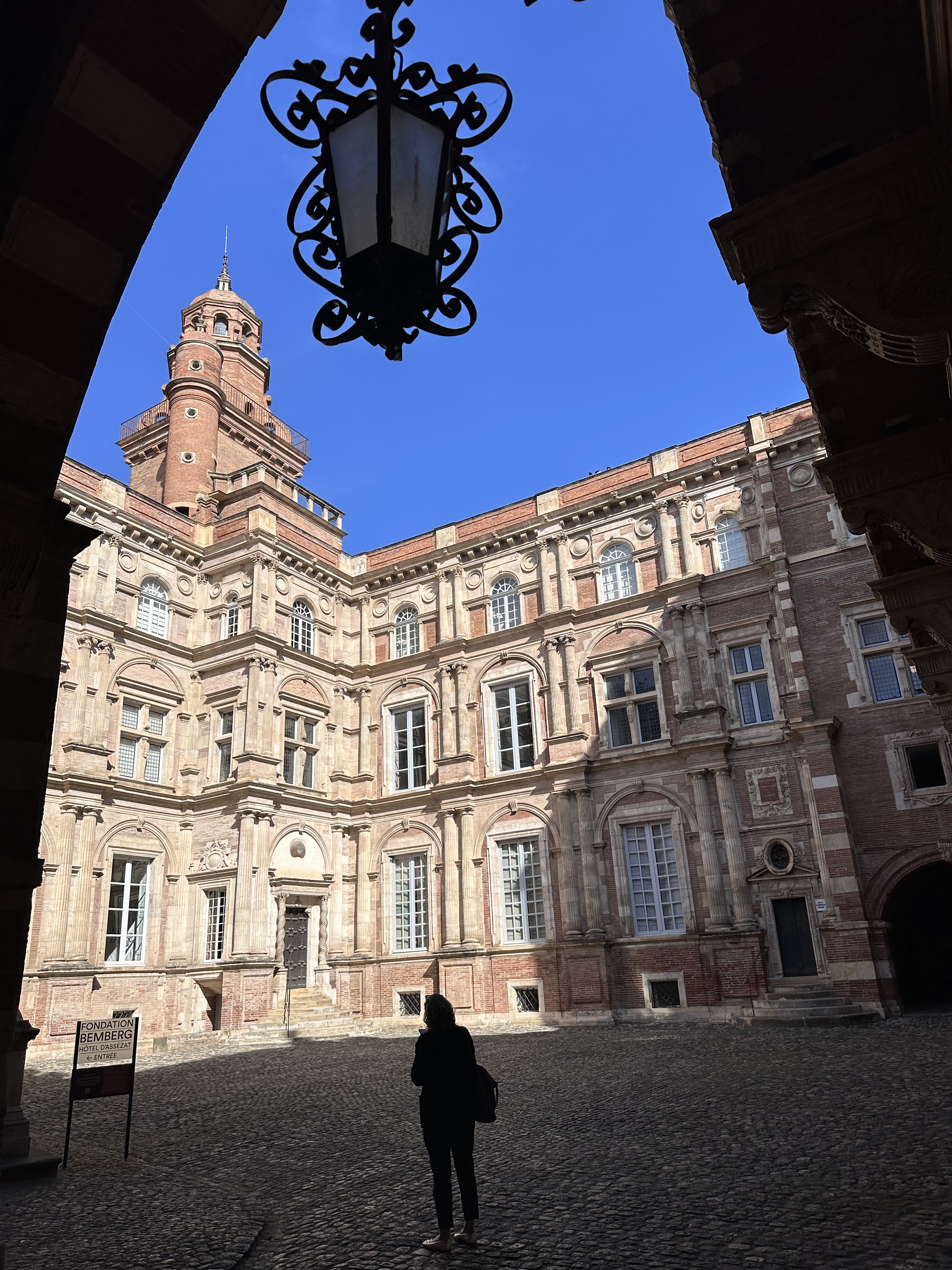
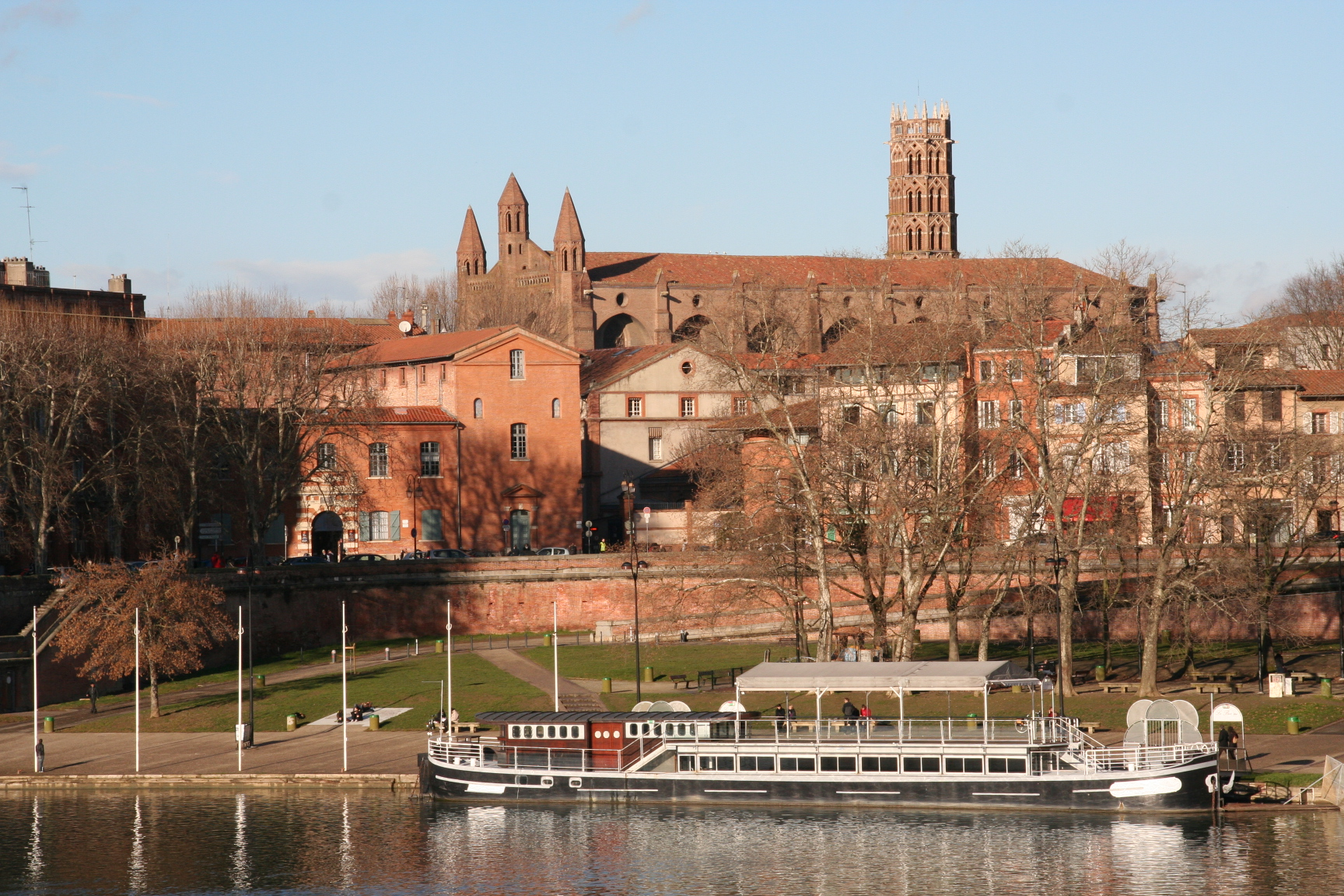
- View of Old Toulouse Ariane 5 (Cité de l'espace) Basilica of Saint-Sernin Place du Capitole The first Airbus A380 Musée des Augustins Hôtel d'Assézat Church of the Jacobins

- Flag Coat of arms
- Motto(s): Per Tolosa totjorn mai (Occitan for 'For Toulouse, always more')
- Location of Toulouse
- Location within France Location within Occitanie
- Coordinates: 43°36′16″N 1°26′38″E
- Country: France
- Region: Occitania
- Department: Haute-Garonne
- Arrondissement: Toulouse
- Canton: (11 cantons) Toulouse-1, 2, 3, 4, 5, 6, 7, 8, 9, 10 and 11
- Intercommunality: Toulouse Métropole

Government
  - Mayor (2026–32): Jean-Luc Moudenc (LR)
- Area^{1}: 118.3 km^{2} (45.7 sq mi)
  - Urban (2025): 957.5 km^{2} (369.7 sq mi)
  - Metro (2025): 6,520.2 km^{2} (2,517.5 sq mi)
- Population (2023): 514,819
  - Rank: 4th in France
  - Density: 4,352/km^{2} (11,270/sq mi)
  - Urban (2023): 1,093,783
  - Urban density: 1,142/km^{2} (2,959/sq mi)
  - Metro (2023): 1,529,112
  - Metro density: 234.52/km^{2} (607.40/sq mi)
- Demonym(s): English: Toulousian; French: Toulousain(e); Occitan: tolosenc(a)
- Time zone: UTC+01:00 (CET)
  - Summer (DST): UTC+02:00 (CEST)
- INSEE/Postal code: 31555 /
- Website: metropole.toulouse.fr
- ^{1} French Land Register data, which excludes lakes, ponds, glaciers > 1 km^{2} (0.386 sq mi or 247 acres) and river estuaries.

Toulouse (/tuːˈluːz/ too-LOOZ, French: [tuluz]; Occitan: Tolosa [tuˈluzɔ]) is a city in Southern France, the prefecture of the Haute-Garonne department and of the Occitania region. The city is on the banks of the River Garonne, 150 kilometres (93 miles) from the Mediterranean Sea, 230 km (143 mi) from the Atlantic Ocean and 680 km (420 mi) from Paris. It is the fourth-largest city in France after Paris, Marseille, and Lyon, with 514,819 inhabitants within its municipal boundaries (2023); its metropolitan area has a population of 1,529,112 inhabitants (2023). Toulouse is the central city of one of the 22 metropolitan councils of France. Between the 2014 and 2020 censuses, its metropolitan area was the third fastest growing among metropolitan areas larger than 500,000 inhabitants in France.

Toulouse is the centre of the European aerospace industry, with the headquarters of Airbus, the SPOT satellite system, ATR and the Aerospace Valley. It hosts the CNES's Toulouse Space Centre (CST) which is the largest national space centre in Europe, but also, on the military side, the newly created NATO space centre of excellence and the French Space Command and Space Academy. Safran, Thales Alenia Space, Airbus Defence and Space, Collins Aerospace and Liebherr-Aerospace also have a significant presence in Toulouse.

The air route between Toulouse–Blagnac and the Parisian airports is the busiest in France, transporting 3.2 million passengers in 2019. According to the rankings of L'Express and Challenges, Toulouse is the most dynamic French city.

Founded by the Romans, the city was the capital of the Visigothic Kingdom in the 5th century and the capital of the province of Languedoc in the Late Middle Ages and early modern period (provinces were abolished during the French Revolution), making it the unofficial capital of the cultural region of Occitania (Southern France). It is now the capital of the administrative region of Occitania, the second largest region in Metropolitan France.

The University of Toulouse is one of the oldest in Europe (founded in 1229). Toulouse is also the home of prestigious higher education schools, notably in the field of aerospace engineering. Together with the university, they have turned Toulouse into the fourth-largest student city in France, with a university population of nearly 140,000 students.

Toulouse has three UNESCO World Heritage Sites: the Canal du Midi was designated in 1996 and shared with other cities. The Basilica of St. Sernin, the largest remaining Romanesque building in Europe, was designated in 1998 along with the former hospital Hôtel-Dieu Saint-Jacques because of their significance to the Santiago de Compostela pilgrimage route. The city's unique architecture, made of pinkish terracotta bricks, has earned Toulouse the nickname La Ville rose ("The Pink city"). In 2023, Toulouse was named a UNESCO City of Music, joining UNESCO's Creative Cities Network.

== Geography ==
Toulouse is in the south of France, north of the department of Haute-Garonne, on the axis of communication between the Mediterranean Sea and the Atlantic Ocean. The city, which is about 80 km/50 mi from the Pyrenees, borders with Andorra and Spain.

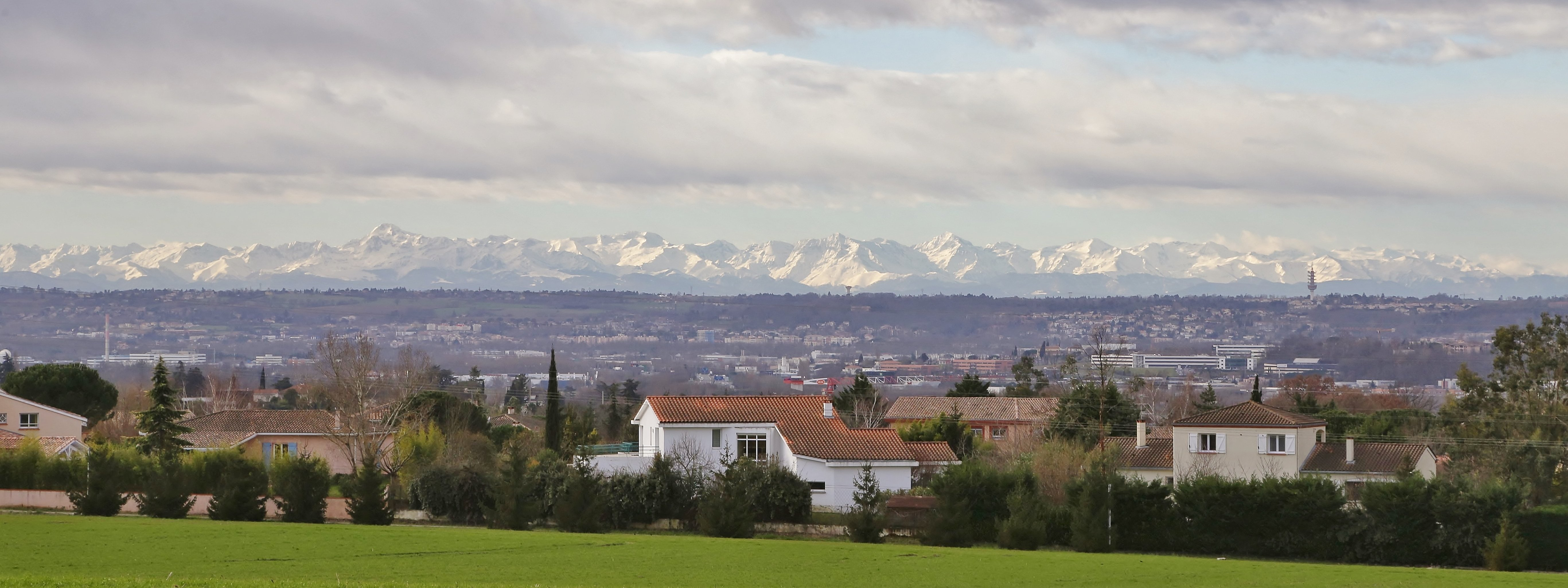
View of the Pyrenees from Toulouse (at a distance of around 80 kilometers, the mountains are visible in clear weather)

=== Hydrography ===
The city is traversed by the Canal de Brienne, the Canal du Midi, the Canal de Garonne and the rivers Garonne, Touch and Hers-Mort.

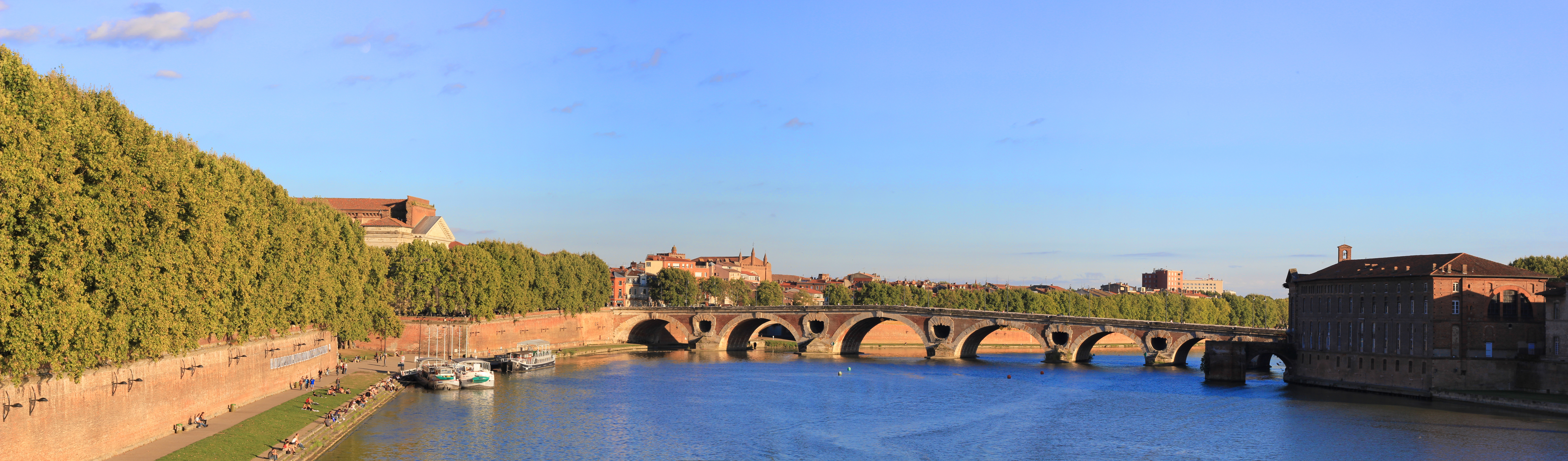
View of the Garonne in Toulouse

=== Climate ===
Toulouse has a four-season humid subtropical climate (Cfa in the Köppen climate classification). Too much precipitation during the summer months prevents the city from being classified in the Mediterranean climate zone.

Climate data for Toulouse (TLS), elevation: 151 m (495 ft), 1991–2020 normals, extremes 1947–present
Month	Jan	Feb	Mar	Apr	May	Jun	Jul	Aug	Sep	Oct	Nov	Dec	Year
Record high °C (°F)	21.2 (70.2)	24.1 (75.4)	27.1 (80.8)	30.0 (86.0)	34.5 (94.1)	40.2 (104.4)	40.2 (104.4)	42.4 (108.3)	37.9 (100.2)	33.0 (91.4)	24.3 (75.7)	21.1 (70.0)	42.4 (108.3)
Mean daily maximum °C (°F)	9.7 (49.5)	11.2 (52.2)	15.0 (59.0)	17.6 (63.7)	21.4 (70.5)	25.7 (78.3)	28.2 (82.8)	28.5 (83.3)	24.8 (76.6)	19.7 (67.5)	13.5 (56.3)	10.4 (50.7)	18.8 (65.8)
Daily mean °C (°F)	6.3 (43.3)	7.1 (44.8)	10.3 (50.5)	12.7 (54.9)	16.4 (61.5)	20.3 (68.5)	22.6 (72.7)	22.8 (73.0)	19.3 (66.7)	15.3 (59.5)	9.9 (49.8)	7.0 (44.6)	14.2 (57.6)
Mean daily minimum °C (°F)	2.9 (37.2)	3.1 (37.6)	5.5 (41.9)	7.9 (46.2)	11.4 (52.5)	15.0 (59.0)	17.0 (62.6)	17.1 (62.8)	13.9 (57.0)	10.9 (51.6)	6.3 (43.3)	3.6 (38.5)	9.6 (49.3)
Record low °C (°F)	−18.6 (−1.5)	−19.2 (−2.6)	−8.4 (16.9)	−3.0 (26.6)	−0.8 (30.6)	4.0 (39.2)	7.6 (45.7)	5.5 (41.9)	1.9 (35.4)	−3.0 (26.6)	−7.5 (18.5)	−12.0 (10.4)	−19.2 (−2.6)
Average precipitation mm (inches)	52.5 (2.07)	37.2 (1.46)	45.3 (1.78)	65.2 (2.57)	73.6 (2.90)	64.2 (2.53)	40.1 (1.58)	44.6 (1.76)	45.7 (1.80)	54.3 (2.14)	55.0 (2.17)	49.3 (1.94)	627.0 (24.69)
Average precipitation days (≥ 1.0 mm)	9.2	7.8	8.2	9.3	9.9	7.1	5.7	5.9	6.6	7.5	10.0	8.7	95.8
Average snowy days	1.8	2.0	0.5	0.3	0.0	0.0	0.0	0.0	0.0	0.0	0.5	1.2	6.1
Average relative humidity (%)	87	82	77	76	76	72	68	71	74	81	85	88	78
Mean monthly sunshine hours	89.1	118.2	175.3	188.5	212.3	231.8	258.6	246.4	210.1	155.2	99.9	89.7	2,075.1
Source 1: Meteo France
Source 2: Infoclimat.fr (relative humidity 1961–1990)

Climate data for Toulouse–Francazal, elevation: 164 m (538 ft), 1991–2020 normals, extremes 1922–present
Month	Jan	Feb	Mar	Apr	May	Jun	Jul	Aug	Sep	Oct	Nov	Dec	Year
Record high °C (°F)	23.3 (73.9)	24.8 (76.6)	28.3 (82.9)	29.9 (85.8)	34.7 (94.5)	39.6 (103.3)	40.2 (104.4)	44.0 (111.2)	38.5 (101.3)	35.4 (95.7)	27.0 (80.6)	26.9 (80.4)	44.0 (111.2)
Mean daily maximum °C (°F)	9.9 (49.8)	11.3 (52.3)	15.0 (59.0)	17.6 (63.7)	21.3 (70.3)	25.5 (77.9)	28.1 (82.6)	28.6 (83.5)	24.8 (76.6)	19.8 (67.6)	13.7 (56.7)	10.7 (51.3)	18.9 (66.0)
Daily mean °C (°F)	6.5 (43.7)	7.3 (45.1)	10.3 (50.5)	12.8 (55.0)	16.5 (61.7)	20.3 (68.5)	22.6 (72.7)	22.8 (73.0)	19.4 (66.9)	15.4 (59.7)	10.0 (50.0)	7.2 (45.0)	14.3 (57.7)
Mean daily minimum °C (°F)	3.1 (37.6)	3.2 (37.8)	5.7 (42.3)	8.0 (46.4)	11.6 (52.9)	15.1 (59.2)	17.0 (62.6)	17.1 (62.8)	13.9 (57.0)	11.0 (51.8)	6.4 (43.5)	3.8 (38.8)	9.7 (49.5)
Record low °C (°F)	−19.0 (−2.2)	−16.7 (1.9)	−7.4 (18.7)	−4.1 (24.6)	0.1 (32.2)	4.5 (40.1)	7.0 (44.6)	7.3 (45.1)	0.0 (32.0)	−2.6 (27.3)	−8.5 (16.7)	−13.4 (7.9)	−19.0 (−2.2)
Average precipitation mm (inches)	56.4 (2.22)	38.8 (1.53)	43.7 (1.72)	65.2 (2.57)	74.7 (2.94)	59.2 (2.33)	42.5 (1.67)	42.6 (1.68)	50.5 (1.99)	52.4 (2.06)	58.2 (2.29)	51.5 (2.03)	635.7 (25.03)
Average precipitation days (≥ 1.0 mm)	8.8	7.6	8.1	9.5	9.5	7.1	5.6	6.0	6.4	7.7	9.6	9.0	94.8
Mean monthly sunshine hours	93.1	116.6	173.6	186.7	207.5	224.8	246.8	234.9	202.5	147.9	94.9	85.4	2,014.5
Source: Meteo France (sun 1991–2010)

== History ==
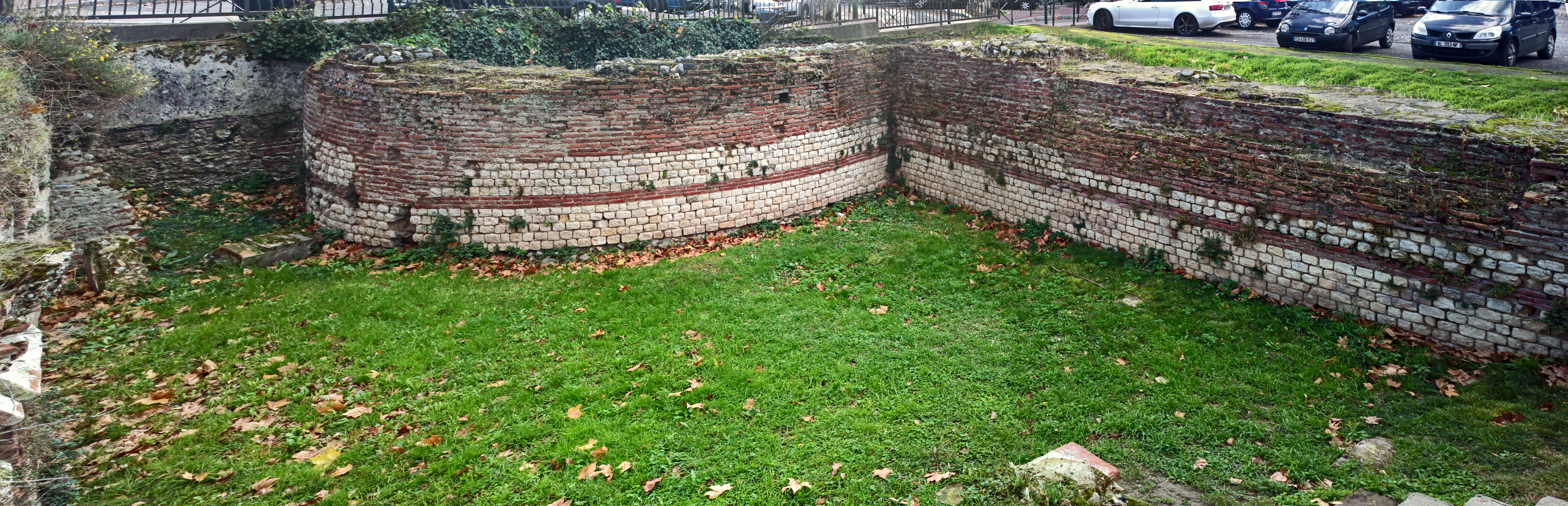
The remains of the Roman wall in Toulouse illustrate the early use of brick and stone in construction.

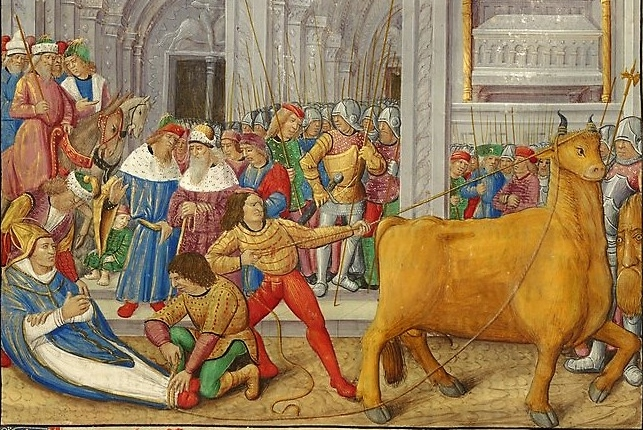
The martyrdom of Saint Saturnin

In the 5th century, Toulouse was the capital of a vast Visigothic Kingdom that stretched from the Loire to Gibraltar.

=== Early history ===
The Garonne Valley was a central point for trade between the Pyrenees, the Mediterranean and the Atlantic since at least the Iron Age. The historical name of the city, Tolosa (Τολῶσσα in Greek, and of its inhabitants, the Tolosates, first recorded in the 2nd century BC), is of unknown meaning or origin, possibly from Aquitanian or Iberian, but it has also been connected to the name of the Gaulish Volcae Tectosages, or to the same root as Irish tulach or Welsh twlch, (little hill).

==== Toulouse refounded by the Romans on the banks of the Garonne ====
Tolosa enters the historical period in the 2nd century BC, when it became a Roman military outpost. After the conquest of Gaul, it was developed as a Roman city in Gallia Narbonensis. Under the reign of Emperor Augustus and thanks to the Pax Romana, the Romans moved the city a few kilometres from the hills where it was an oppidum to the banks of the Garonne, which were more suitable for trade.

In the second half of the 1st century, the emperor Domitian distinguished Toulouse by placing it under the patronage of the goddess Pallas Athena, so that the Latin poets Martial, Ausonius and Sidonius Apollinaris called the city Palladia Tolosa (Palladian Toulouse), a term that was still used in the Renaissance and even today when the city is presented as propitious to the arts and letters.

Around the year 250, Toulouse was marked by the martyrdom of Saturnin, the first bishop of Toulouse. This episode illustrates the difficult beginnings of Christianity in Roman Gaul.

==== Capital of the Visigothic Kingdom ====
In the 5th century, Toulouse fell to the Visigothic kingdom and became one of its major cities, even serving as its capital, before it fell to the Franks under Clovis in 507 during the Battle of Vouillé. From that time, Toulouse was the capital of Aquitaine within the Frankish realm.

==== Under Frankish rule ====
In 721, Duke Odo of Aquitaine defeated an invading Umayyad Muslim army at the Battle of Toulouse. Many Arab chroniclers consider that Odo's victory was the real stop to Muslim expansion into Christian Europe, incursions of the following years being simple raids without real will of conquest (including the one that ended with Charles Martel's victory at the Battle of Tours, also called the Battle of Poitiers).

The Frankish conquest of Septimania followed in the 750s, and a quasi-independent County of Toulouse emerged within the Carolingian sub-kingdom of Aquitaine by the late 8th century. The Battle of Toulouse of 844, pitting Charles the Bald against Pepin II of Aquitaine, was key in the Carolingian Civil War.

=== County of Toulouse ===
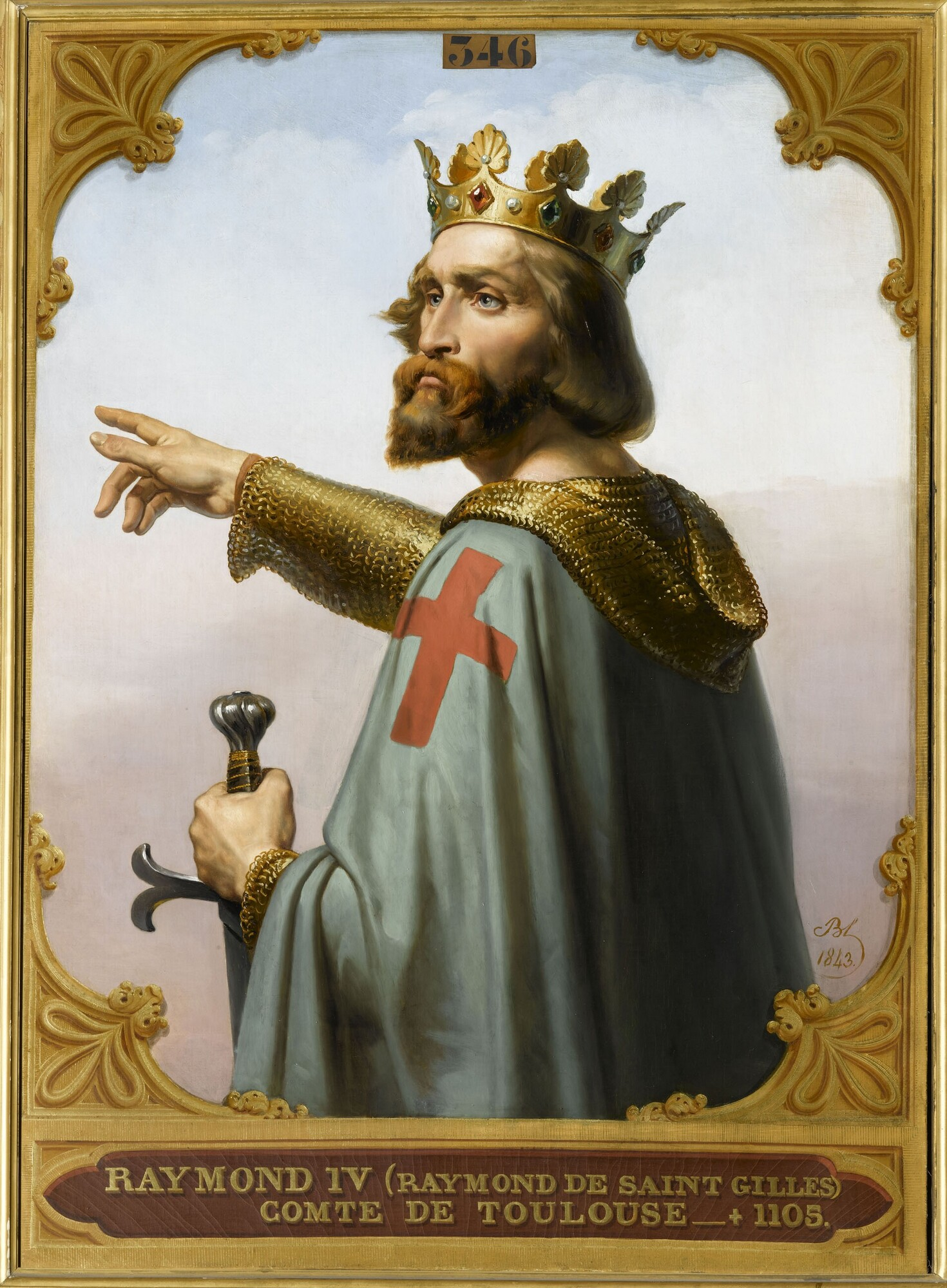
Raymond IV, Count of Toulouse was a leader of the First Crusade.

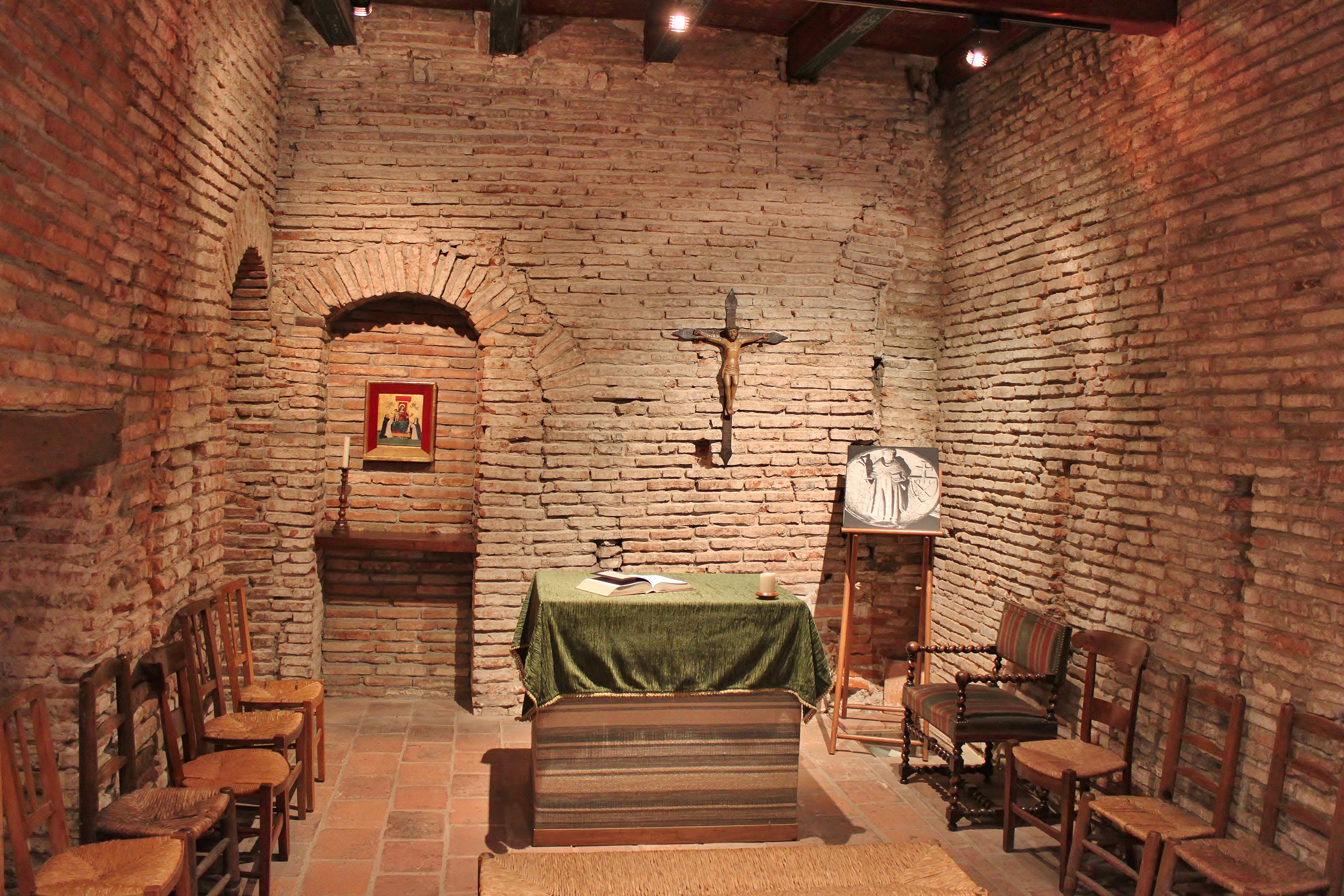
St Dominic's room at Maison Seilhan is considered the birthplace of the Dominican Order.

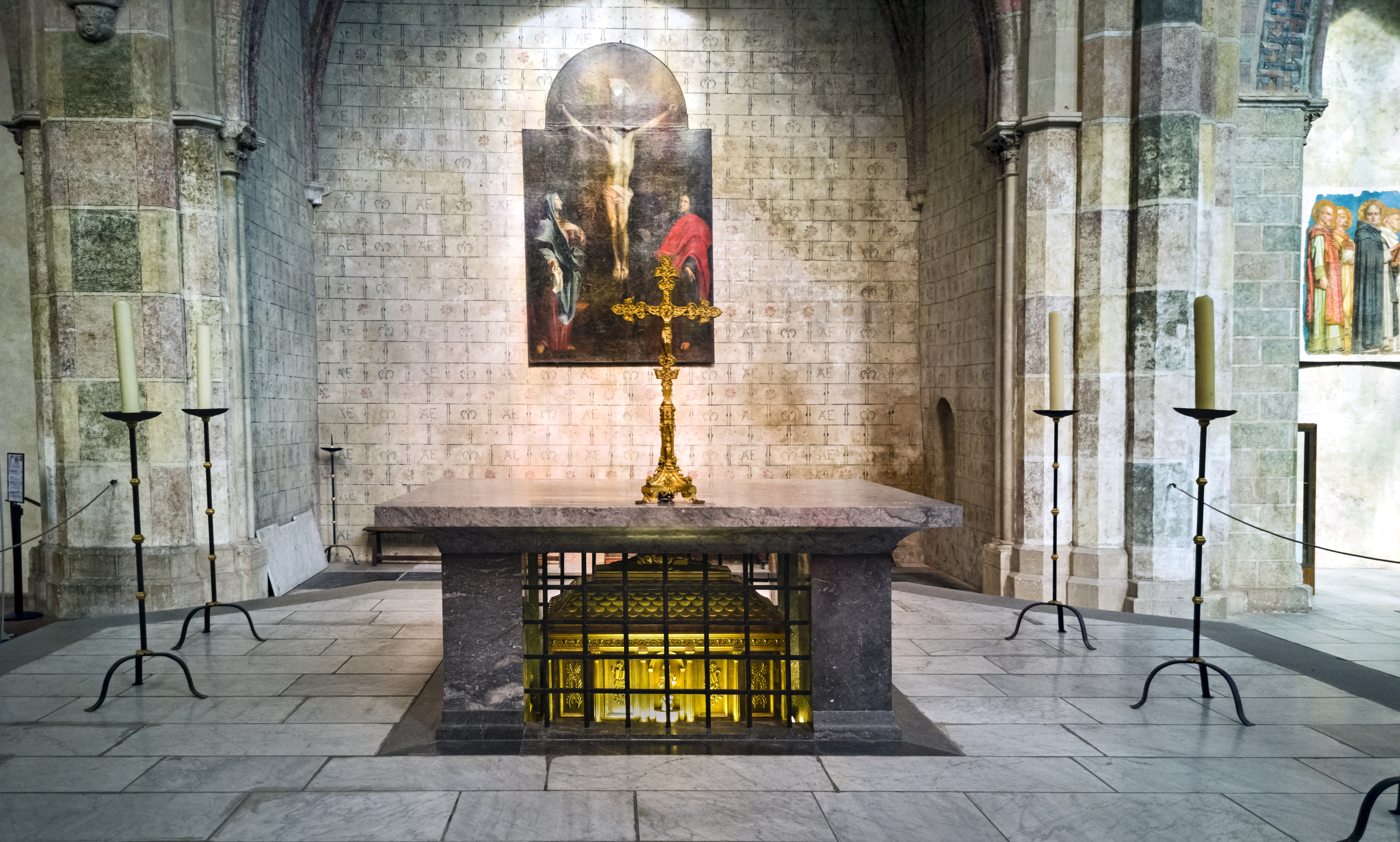
Burial of Saint Thomas Aquinas in the church of the Jacobins in Toulouse

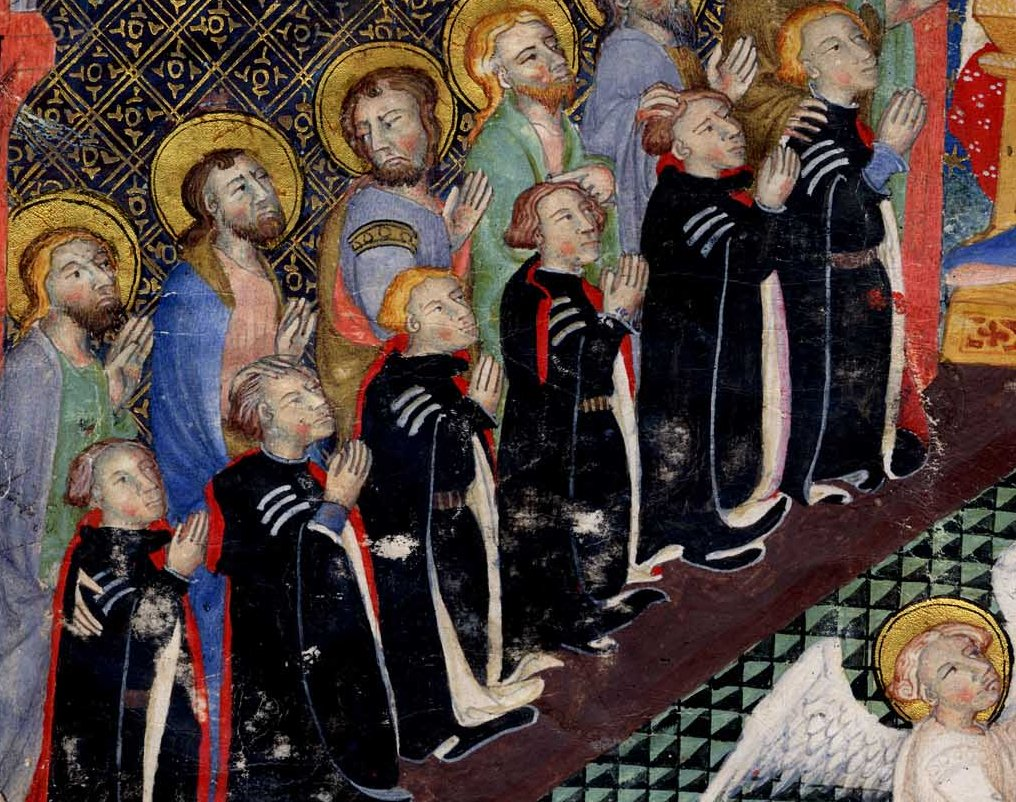
Over nearly 5 centuries the capitouls (the municipal consuls) held an exceptional collection of their portraits in the municipal annals.

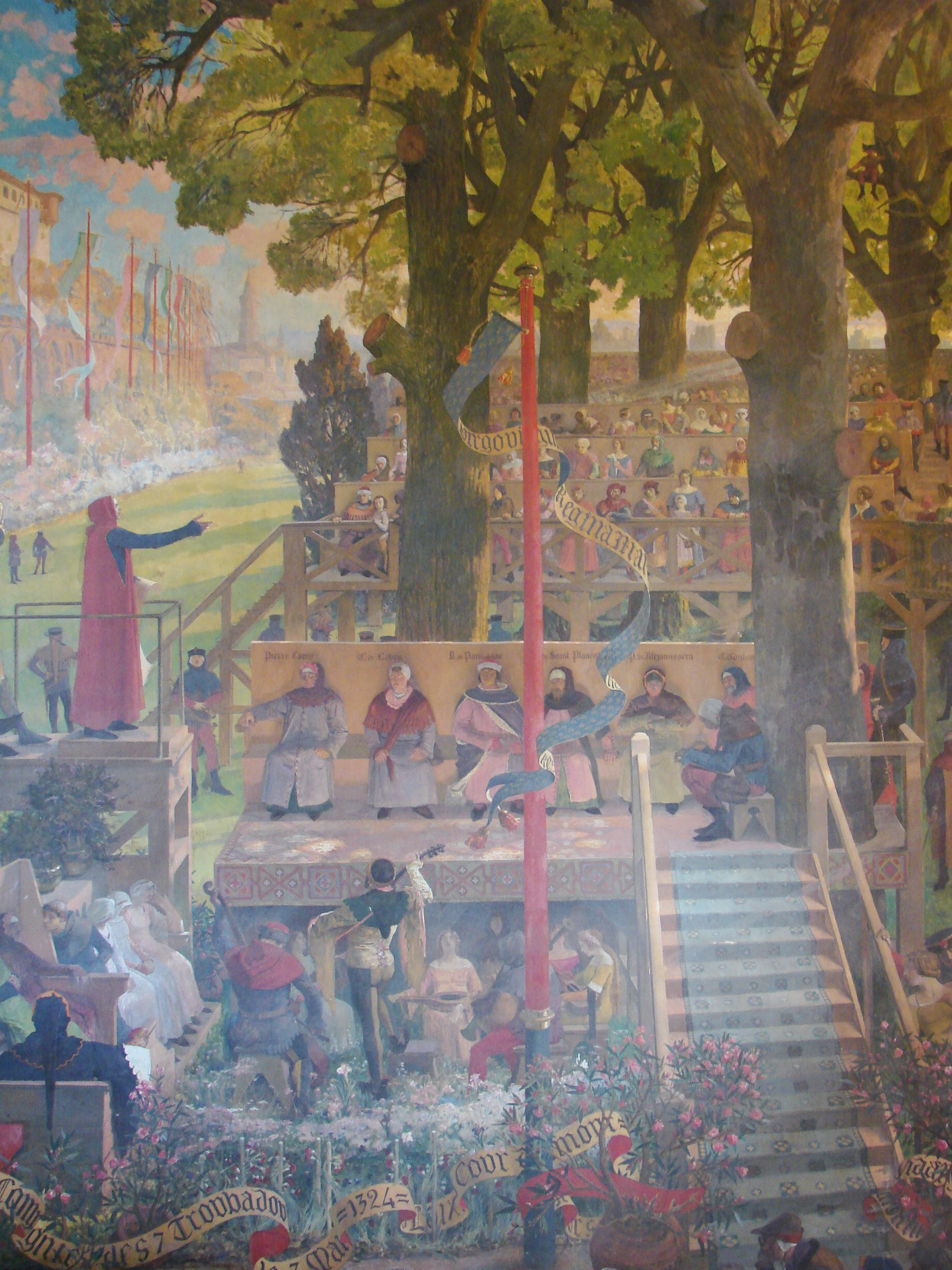
Painting representing the first session of the poetry contest of the Consistori del Gay Saber (later known as the Academy of the Floral Games), the oldest literary society in Europe

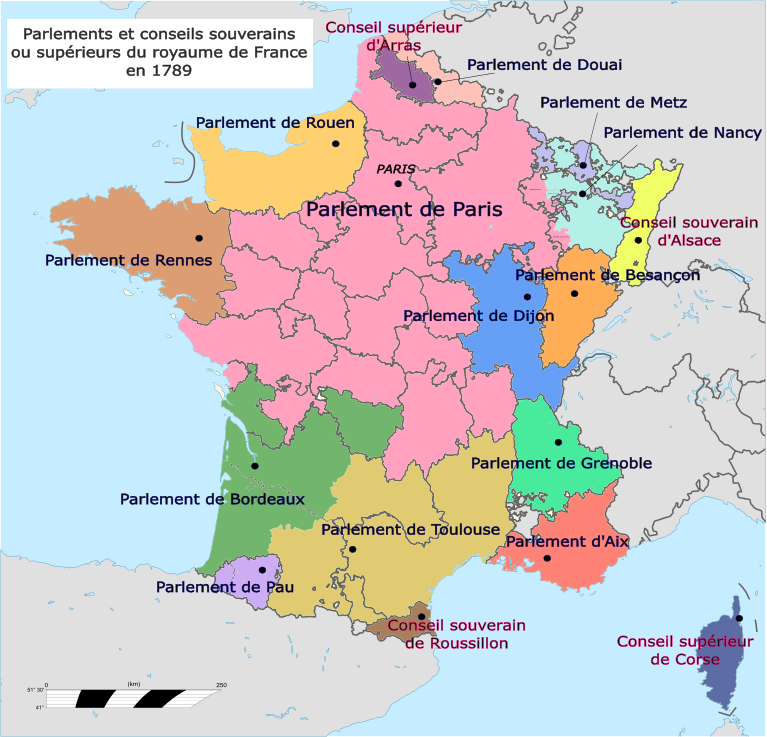
The Parlement of Toulouse was the second most important and oldest in the kingdom after that of Paris, making Toulouse the judicial capital of a large part of southern France.

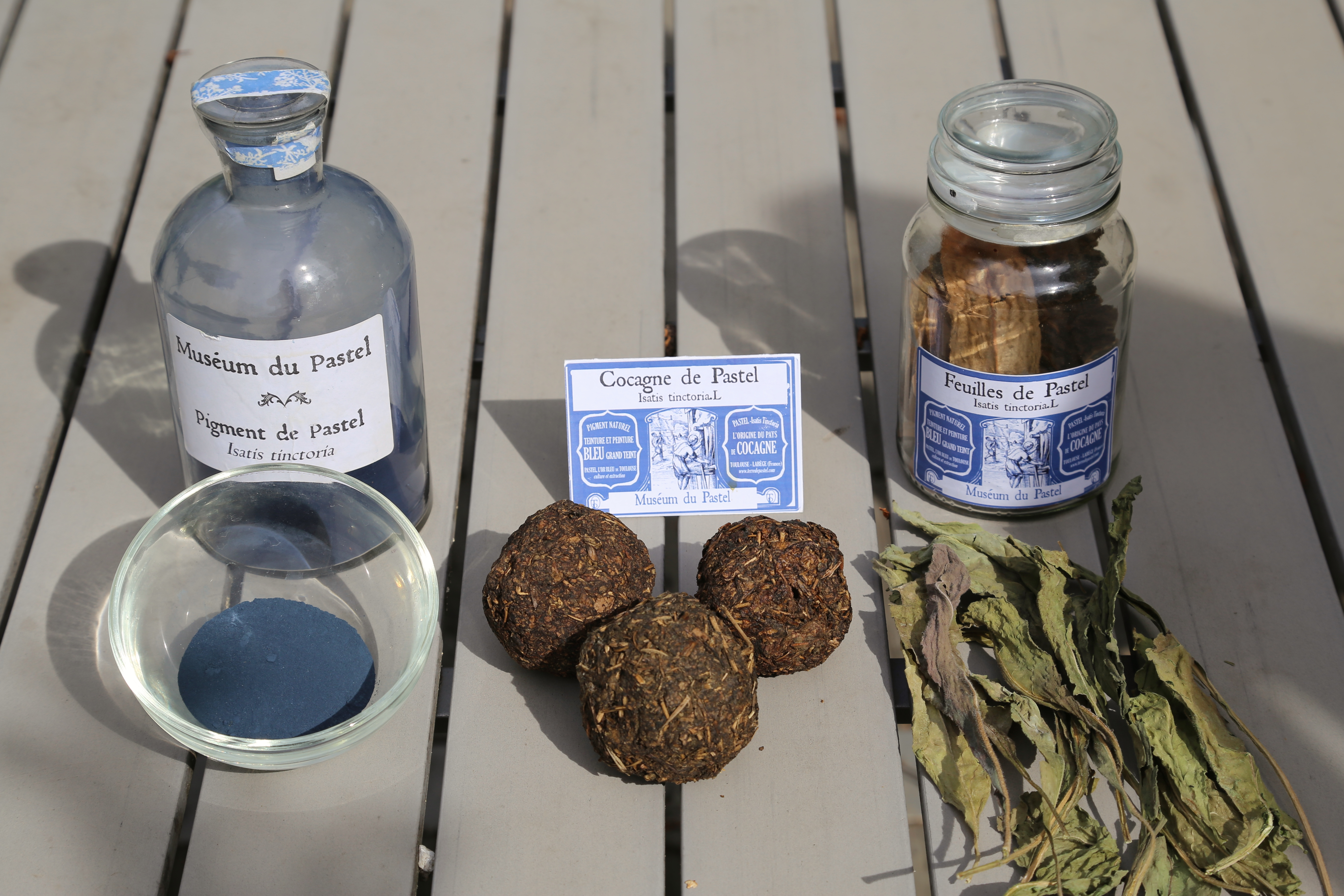
The woad trade, which was the only source of blue dye at the time in Europe, made the fortune of the merchants of Toulouse during the Renaissance.

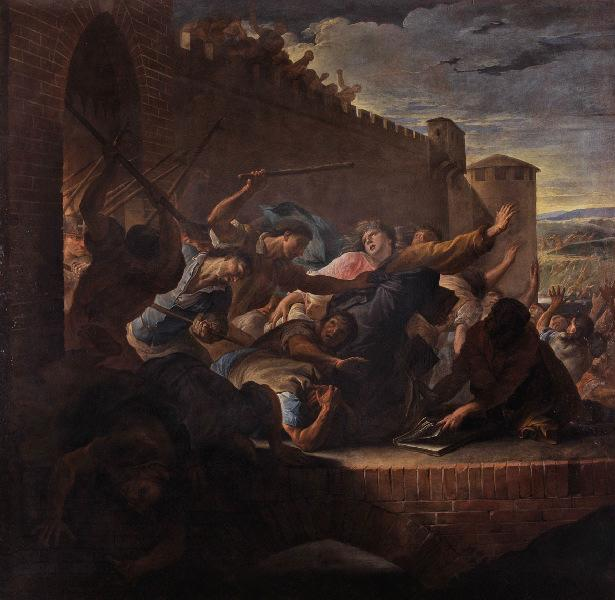
The Expulsion of the Huguenots from Toulouse in 1562.

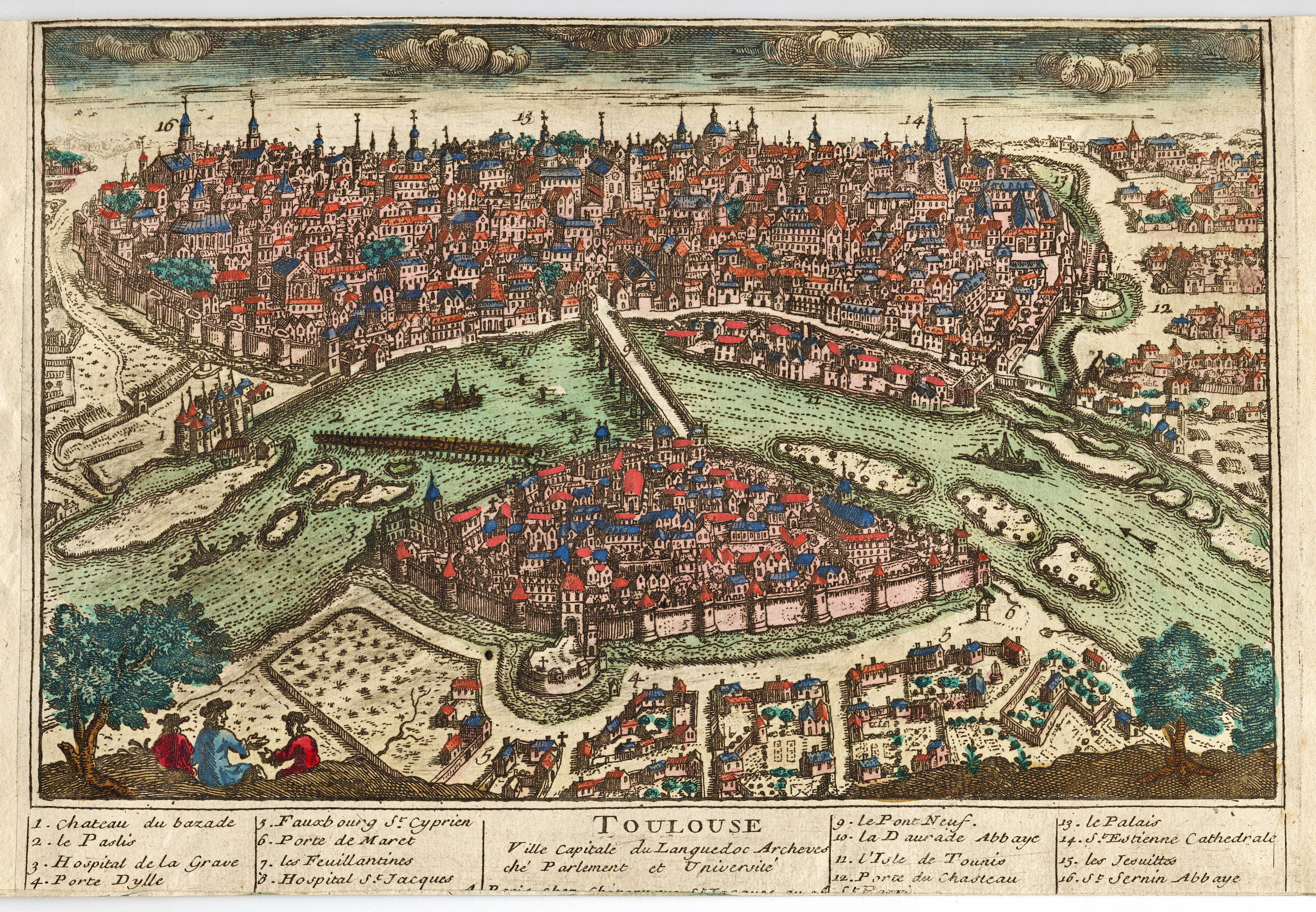
1650 – Toulouse, capital of Languedoc

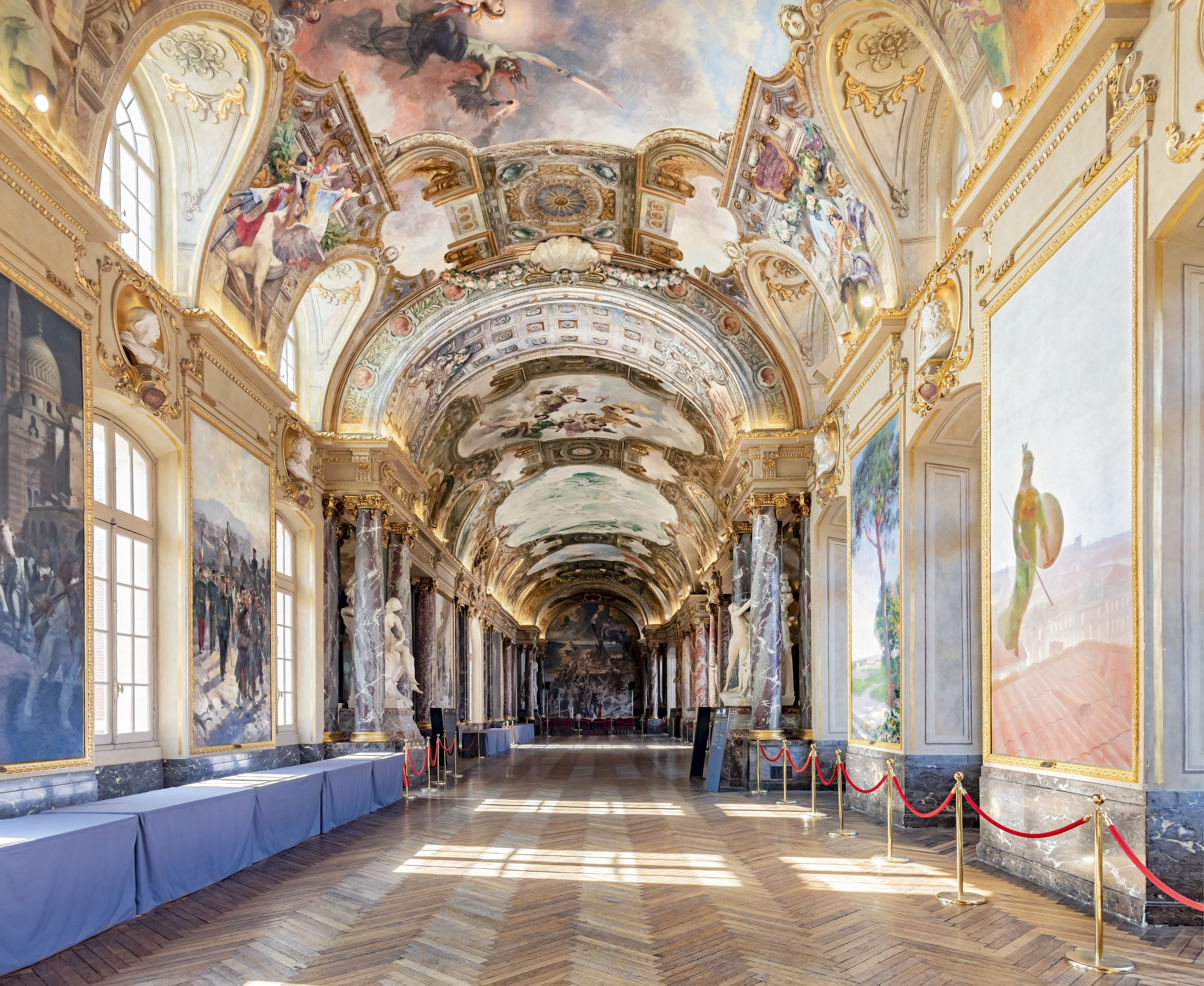
The vast Hall of the Illustrious (Salle des Illustres) in the Capitole presents numerous paintings and sculptures illustrating the history of Toulouse.

Charlemagne had created the county of Toulouse in 778 to guard the border of Muslim Spain, but the disintegration of the kingdom of Aquitaine and the weakness of royal power in the following centuries led to the de facto independence of the county of Toulouse and many provinces.

In the 11th and 12th centuries, southern France was still steeped in Latin culture. Unlike the north of France, justice followed written Roman law and the nobles were highly educated. This was the time of the troubadours who wrote their poetry in Occitan (called "Provençal" at the time), then one of the most sophisticated languages in Europe. Like the other great lords of the Midi, the counts of Toulouse maintained and favoured these poets, this is how Count Raymond V employed for some time the famous Bernard de Ventadour, expert in singing courtly love.

In 1096, Raymond IV, Count of Toulouse, left with his army at the call of the Pope Urban II to join the First Crusade, of which he was one of the main leaders. This exodus of its warriors and nobles, reinforced by the creation of the faraway County of Tripoli by Raymond IV at the beginning of the 12th century, weakened the city militarily as well as the ascendancy that its counts had over it. The Duke William IX of Aquitaine challenged the possession of the city on the grounds that it should have been inherited by his wife Philippa (daughter of the previous count of Toulouse, whereas Raymond IV was only his brother). More than 50 years later his granddaughter Eleanor of Aquitaine still claimed the inheritance in vain.

In the 12th century the city left its Roman limits and a new district developed around the church of Saint-Sernin: the Bourg. The church of Saint-Sernin was famous and revered for its many relics, and the chapter of its canons, which had possessions as far away as Spain, was powerful enough to free itself from the control of the bishop of Toulouse. This dissent had important local political repercussions, making the Bourg in practice a separate district from the city. In 1152, the notables of Toulouse took advantage of a weakening of the county power to obtain for their city a great autonomy, they created a municipal body of consuls, called capitouls in Toulouse, to lead the city. The Bourg, which had only a quarter of the inhabitants of Toulouse, obtained as many capitouls as the rest of the city. Economically, Toulouse, which was at the center of a large cereal-growing plain, was distinguished by its numerous mills that took advantage of the force of the Garonne, among which the Bazacle Milling Company was the first recorded European joint-stock company.

==== The fight against Catharism and its various aspects ====
At the beginning of the thirteenth century the County of Toulouse was caught up in another crusade that would last twenty years (1209–1229), of which it was the target this time. The reason for this was the development of Catharism in the south of France, which the Pope Innocent III wanted to eradicate by all possible means.

After an initial victory of the crusaders led by Simon de Montfort who defeated the combined forces of Count Raymond VI of Toulouse and King Peter II of Aragon at the Battle of Muret, the following years saw the fate of the county of Toulouse swing alternately in favour of one party or the other. Finally, a late intervention by King Louis VIII of France in 1226 tipped the balance in favour of the crusaders, resulting in the submission of Count Raymond VII to the French Crown and the end of the independence of the County of Toulouse.

But beyond the military crusade, this struggle took on several important aspects for the city of Toulouse:

- The Dominican Order was founded in Toulouse by Saint Dominic in 1215. Spanish priest Dominic de Guzmán wanted to convert the Cathars to Catholicism peacefully, by preaching and by living a poor and exemplary life. After years of criss-crossing the Lauraguais countryside between Carcassonne and Toulouse, he changed his method and decided to preach in town. In 1215 he settled in Toulouse and founded a mendicant order which, within a few decades, would cover Europe with hundreds of convents: The Order of Preachers, also known as the Dominicans.
- Under the impulse of the bishop of Toulouse, Foulques, an original and austere architectural style was born in Toulouse, designed to break with the display of luxury of the Catholic church which drove the faithful towards the Cathars: the Southern French Gothic.
- In the Treaty of Paris of 1229, Toulouse formally submitted to the crown of France. The county's sole heiress Joan was engaged to Alphonse, Count of Poitiers, a younger brother of Louis IX of France. The marriage became legal in 1241, but it remained childless and so after Joan's death, the county fell to the Crown of France by inheritance.
- Another consequence of the Treaty of Paris was the creation of the University of Toulouse, established on the Parisian model, strongly sponsored by the pope and intended as a means to dissolve the heretic movement.
- Also in 1229, the Council of Toulouse was held, which laid the foundations for the long period of Inquisition that was to eradicate Catharism in the region after the military victory of the Crusade.

=== Kingdom of France ===
In 1271, Joan of Toulouse and her husband Alphonse of Poitiers died without heirs. Toulouse, which since the treaty of 1229 had been subordinate to the kingdom of France, no longer had a count and was annexed to the royal domain. The installation of numerous royal officers and the development of trade and crafts, which favoured the social ascension of merchants, renewed the city's elites. In 1298, King Philip the Fair greatly facilitated the possibility of ennobling the capitouls, whose council, renewed every year, was increasingly made up of rich merchants.

The first half of the 14th century was a prosperous period, despite the dismemberment in 1317 of the very large bishopric of Toulouse (which lost two thirds of its area and a large part of its income, a loss only partially compensated by its elevation to the rank of archbishopric), and the episode of the Shepherds' Crusade which brought a pogrom against Toulouse's Jewish population in 1320. In 1335, Toulouse had between 35,000 and 40,000 inhabitants.

In 1323, the Consistori del Gay Saber was created in Toulouse to preserve the lyric art of the troubadours by organizing a poetry contest; and Toulouse became the centre of Occitan literary culture for the following centuries. The Consistori is considered to be the oldest literary society in Europe, at the origin of one of the most sophisticated treatise on grammar and rhetoric of the Middle Ages, and in 1694 it was transformed into the Royal Academy of the Floral Games (Académie des Jeux Floraux), still active today, by king Louis XIV.

The 14th century also saw a significant increase in the influence of the University of Toulouse, particularly following the move of the papacy from Rome to Avignon. Many law graduates from the University of Toulouse had brilliant careers in the Avignon curia, several became cardinals and three became popes: John XXII, Innocent VI and Urban V. These powerful prelates financed the establishment of colleges in the university towns of southern France, not only Toulouse but also Montpellier, Cahors and Avignon.

The Black Death in 1348, then the Hundred Years' War caused a major crisis that lasted until the following century. Despite strong immigration, the population lost more than 10,000 inhabitants in 70 years. By 1405 Toulouse had only 19,000 people. In these hardships, the city was the key stronghold of the French defence in the south of France during the worst years of the Hundred Years' War, when the English troops from Aquitaine had taken Montauban and only Toulouse remained as an obstacle to their conquest of southern France. This military threat to the city and especially to the surrounding countryside was not conducive to its development, despite the strengthening of ties with the royalty that it entailed.

In 1369, pope Urban V attributed to the Dominican church of the Jacobins of Toulouse the bones of the Dominican theologian Saint Thomas Aquinas, perhaps to honor the city that had been the cradle of the Dominican order at the beginning of the previous century.

The political and economic situation improved by the middle of the 15th century. In 1443 King Charles VII established the second parlement of France after that of Paris. Reinforcing its place as an administrative and judicial center, the city grew richer, participating in the trade of Bordeaux wine with England, as well as cereals and textiles. A major source of income was the production and export of pastel, a blue dye made from woad.

Toulouse suffered several fires, but it was in 1463 that the Great Fire of Toulouse broke out, ravaging the city for fifteen days. After this dramatic event, Louis XI exempted the city from taxes for 100 years. The capitouls issued municipal decrees favouring the use of brick in buildings, rather than excessively flammable wood or cob.

In the 16th century, and until 1562, the economy of Toulouse experienced a golden age: its parlement made it the judicial capital of a large part of southern France, and the city became the first European centre for the trade in woad, the only blue dye then known in Europe which was very much in demand in the textile industry at the time. Its humanist milieu developed thanks to its university and parlement, which trained and attracted intellectual elites. The wealth generated by this culturally and economically dynamic environment is the source of the superb Renaissance mansions in Toulouse. In 1550 the population of the city made it the second or third largest city in France. It was estimated to have 50,000 inhabitants, a figure it would not regain until the 18th century.

In 1562, the French Wars of Religion began and Toulouse became an ultra-Catholic stronghold in a predominantly Huguenot region. The era of economic prosperity came to an end, especially since all the capitouls of that year and a large proportion of the merchants were Huguenots and had to flee the city for several years. The governor of Languedoc, Henri II de Montmorency, who had rebelled, was executed in 1632 in the Capitole in the presence of King Louis XIII and Cardinal Richelieu.

In 1666, Pierre-Paul Riquet started the construction of the Canal du Midi which links Toulouse to the Mediterranean Sea, and is considered one of the greatest construction works of the 17th century. Completed in 1681, the canal stimulated the economy of Toulouse by promoting the export of cereals and the import of olive oil, wine and other goods from the Mediterranean regions.

In the 18th century, Toulouse was a provincial capital that prided itself on its royal academies (the only city in France, along with Paris, to have three royal academies), but sometimes seemed far removed from the debates of ideas that agitated the Enlightenment. A famous example illustrates this backwardness of Toulouse mentalities of the time: in 1762 its powerful parlement sentenced Jean Calas to death. The philosopher Voltaire then accused the Parlement of Toulouse of religious intolerance (Calas was a Huguenot), gave the affair a European repercussion and succeeded in having the judgment of the parlement quashed by the King's Council, which did much damage to the reputation of the parlement. It was on this occasion that Voltaire published one of his major philosophical works: his famous Treatise on Tolerance.

With the French Revolution of 1789 and the reform or suppression of all royal institutions, Toulouse lost much of its power and influence: until then the capital of the vast province of Languedoc, with a parlement ruling over an even larger territory, the city then found itself simply at the head of the single small department of Haute-Garonne.

=== 19th century ===
On 10 April 1814, four days after Napoleon's surrender of the French Empire to the nations of the Sixth Coalition (a fact that the two armies involved were not yet aware of), the Battle of Toulouse pitted the Hispanic-British troops of Field Marshal Wellington against the French troops of Napoleonic Marshal Soult, who, although they managed to resist, were forced to withdraw. Toulouse was thus the scene of the last Franco-British battle on French territory.

Unlike most large French cities, there was no real industrial revolution in 19th century Toulouse. The most important industries were the gunpowder factory, to meet military needs, and the tobacco factory. In 1856 the railway arrived in Toulouse and the city was modernised: the ramparts were replaced by large boulevards, and major avenues such as the rue d'Alsace-Lorraine and the rue de Metz opened up the historic centre.

In 1875, a flood of the Garonne devastated more than 1,000 houses and killed 200 people. It also destroyed all the bridges in Toulouse, except the Pont-Neuf.

=== 20th and 21st centuries ===
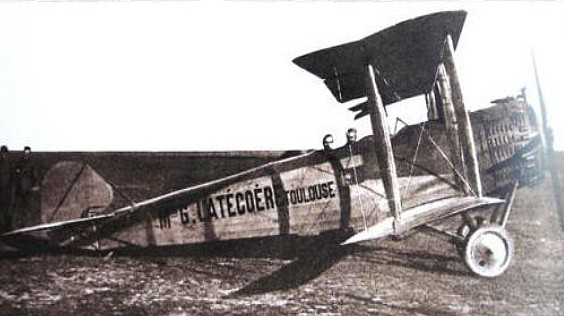
The epic of l'Aéropostale has written some of the most beautiful pages in the history of aviation in Toulouse.

World War I brought to Toulouse (geographically sheltered from enemy attacks) chemical industries as well as aviation workshops (Latécoère, Dewoitine), which launched the city's aeronautical construction tradition and gave birth after the war to the famous Aéropostale, a pioneering airmail company based in Toulouse and whose epics were popularised by the novels of writers such as Joseph Kessel and Antoine de Saint-Exupéry (himself an Aéropostale pilot).

In the 1920s and 1930s the rise of the Toulouse population was increased by the arrival of Italians and Spaniards fleeing fascist regimes. Then, in the early 1960s, French repatriates from Algeria swelled the city's population.

In 1963, Toulouse was chosen to become one of the country's eight "balancing Metropolises", regaining a position among the country's major cities that it had lost in the 19th century. The French state then encouraged the city's specialisation in aeronautics and space activities, sectors that had experienced strong growth in recent decades, fueling economic and population growth.

On 21 September 2001, an explosion occurred at the AZF fertiliser factory, causing 31 deaths, about 30 seriously wounded and 2,500 light casualties. The blast measured 3.4 on the Richter scale and the explosion was heard 80 km (50 mi) away.

In 2016, a territorial reform made Toulouse the regional prefecture of Occitanie, the second largest region in metropolitan France, giving it a role commensurate with its past as a provincial capital among the most important in France.

== Population ==
Historical population
	Urban Area	Metropolitan; Area
1695	43,000	
1750	48,000	
1790	52,863	
1801	50,171	
1831	59,630	
1851	95,277	
1872	126,936	
1911	149,000	
1936	213,220	
1946	264,411	
1954	268,865	
1962	329,044	
1968	489,293	687,804
1975	570,217	776,960
1982	601,576	827,714
1990	683,436	935,009
1999	782,296	1,062,974
2007	888,479	1,235,746
2012	940,016	1,322,271
2017	1,004,747	1,414,936
2023	1,093,783	1,529,112

The population of the city proper (French: commune) was 511,684 as of January 2022, with 1,513,396 inhabitants in the metropolitan area, up from 1,268,438 at the January 2009 census. Thus, the metropolitan area registered a population growth rate of +1.63% per year between 2009 and 2021, the third-highest growth rate of any French metropolitan area larger than 500,000 inhabitants in France, after Montpellier and Bordeaux, although it was slightly lower than the growth rate registered between the 1990 and 2009 censuses. Toulouse is the fourth most populated city in France, after Paris, Marseille and Lyon, and the fifth most populated metropolitan area after Paris, Lyon, Marseille, and Lille. During the next census 2023 or 2024, the city of Toulouse should become the 3rd most populous city in France ahead of Lyon because its growth is stronger.

Historical population of the commune of Toulouse

Year	Pop.	±% p.a.
1793	52,612	—
1800	50,171	−0.68%
1806	51,689	+0.50%
1821	52,328	+0.08%
1831	59,639	+1.32%
1836	77,372	+5.04%
1841	90,368	+3.15%
1846	94,227	+0.83%
1851	96,564	+0.49%
1856	103,144	+1.39%
1861	113,714	+1.94%
1866	126,936	+2.22%
1872	124,852	−0.28%
1876	131,642	+1.18%
1881	140,289	+1.24%
1886	147,617	+1.13%
1891	149,791	+0.30%
1896	149,963	+0.02%
1901	149,841	−0.02%

Year	Pop.	±% p.a.
1906	149,438	−0.05%
1911	149,576	+0.02%
1921	175,434	+1.61%
1926	180,771	+0.60%
1931	194,564	+1.48%
1936	213,220	+1.85%
1946	264,411	+2.18%
1954	268,863	+0.20%
1962	323,724	+2.40%
1968	370,796	+2.29%
1975	373,796	+0.12%
1982	347,995	−1.01%
1990	358,688	+0.38%
1999	390,350	+0.94%
2007	439,453	+1.53%
2012	453,317	+0.62%
2017	479,553	+1.13%
2023	514,819	+1.19%

Source: EHESS and INSEE

Fueled by booming aerospace and high-tech industries, the Toulouse metropolitan area's population grew by 57.3% between the 1990 and 2020 censuses (within its 2020 borders), which means +1.52% per year on average during those 30 years, compared with a growth of 15.3% for metropolitan France between 1990 and 2020, i.e. +0.48% per year. This was the second-highest population growth of any French metropolitan area larger than 500,000 inhabitants (only the Montpellier metropolitan area grew more than Toulouse between 1990 and 2019).

The Toulouse metropolitan area reached 1,513,396 inhabitants in January 2022, and stood as the 5th most populated metropolitan area in France, behind the metropolitan areas of Paris, Lyon, Marseille, and Lille, but ahead of the metropolitan area of Bordeaux, which the Toulouse metropolitan area passed in population in the 1990s. During the next census 2023, the metropolitan area of Toulouse will become the 4th most populous in France ahead of Lille because its growth is stronger.

A local Jewish group estimates there are about 2,500 Jewish families in Toulouse. A Muslim association has estimated there are some 35,000 Muslims in town.

=== Immigration ===
Foreign-born population in Toulouse by country of birth
Country of birth	Population (2020)
Algeria	14,152
Morocco	11,887
Spain	5,542
Tunisia	3,943
Portugal	2,983
Italy	2,386
Romania	1,415
Vietnam	1,348
Madagascar	1,346
Ivory Coast	1,198

== Government and politics ==
=== Toulouse Métropole ===
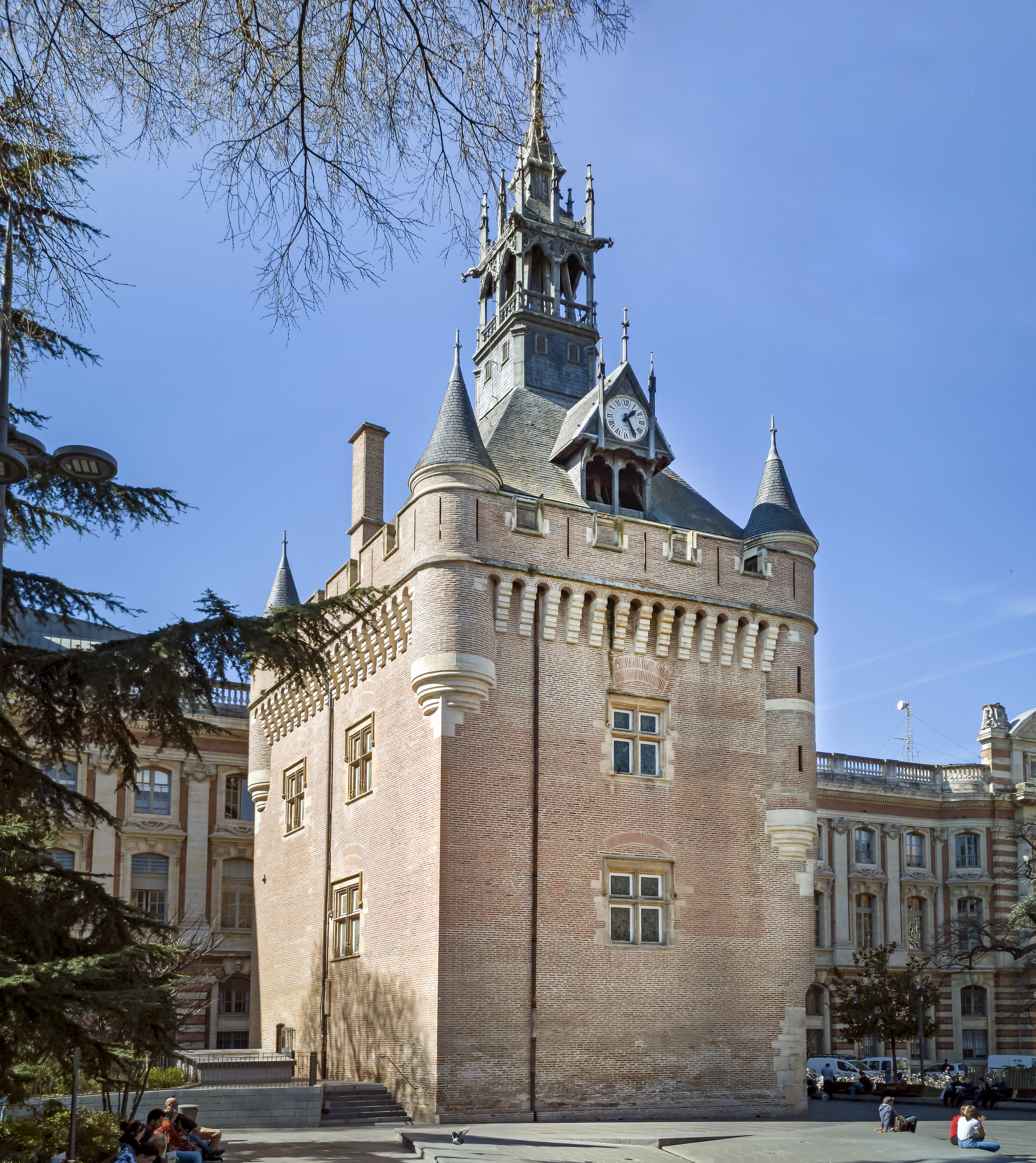
Former tower of the city archives and meeting place of the capitouls, 1525–1530

The Community of Agglomeration of Greater Toulouse (Communauté d'agglomération du Grand Toulouse) was created in 2001 to better coordinate transport, infrastructure and economic policies between the city of Toulouse and its immediate independent suburbs. It succeeds a previous district which had been created in 1992 with fewer powers than the current council. It combines the city of Toulouse and 24 independent communes, covering an area of 380 km^{2} (147 sq mi), totalling a population of 583,229 inhabitants (as of 1999 census), 67% of whom live in the city of Toulouse proper. As of February 2004 estimate, the total population of the Community of Agglomeration of Greater Toulouse was 651,209 inhabitants, 65.5% of whom live in the city of Toulouse. Due to local political feuds, the Community of Agglomeration only hosts 61% of the population of the metropolitan area, the other independent suburbs having refused to join in. Since 2009, the Community of agglomeration has become an urban community (in French: communauté urbaine). This has become a métropole in 2015, spanning 37 communes with 806,503 inhabitants in 2020 census.

=== Local politics ===
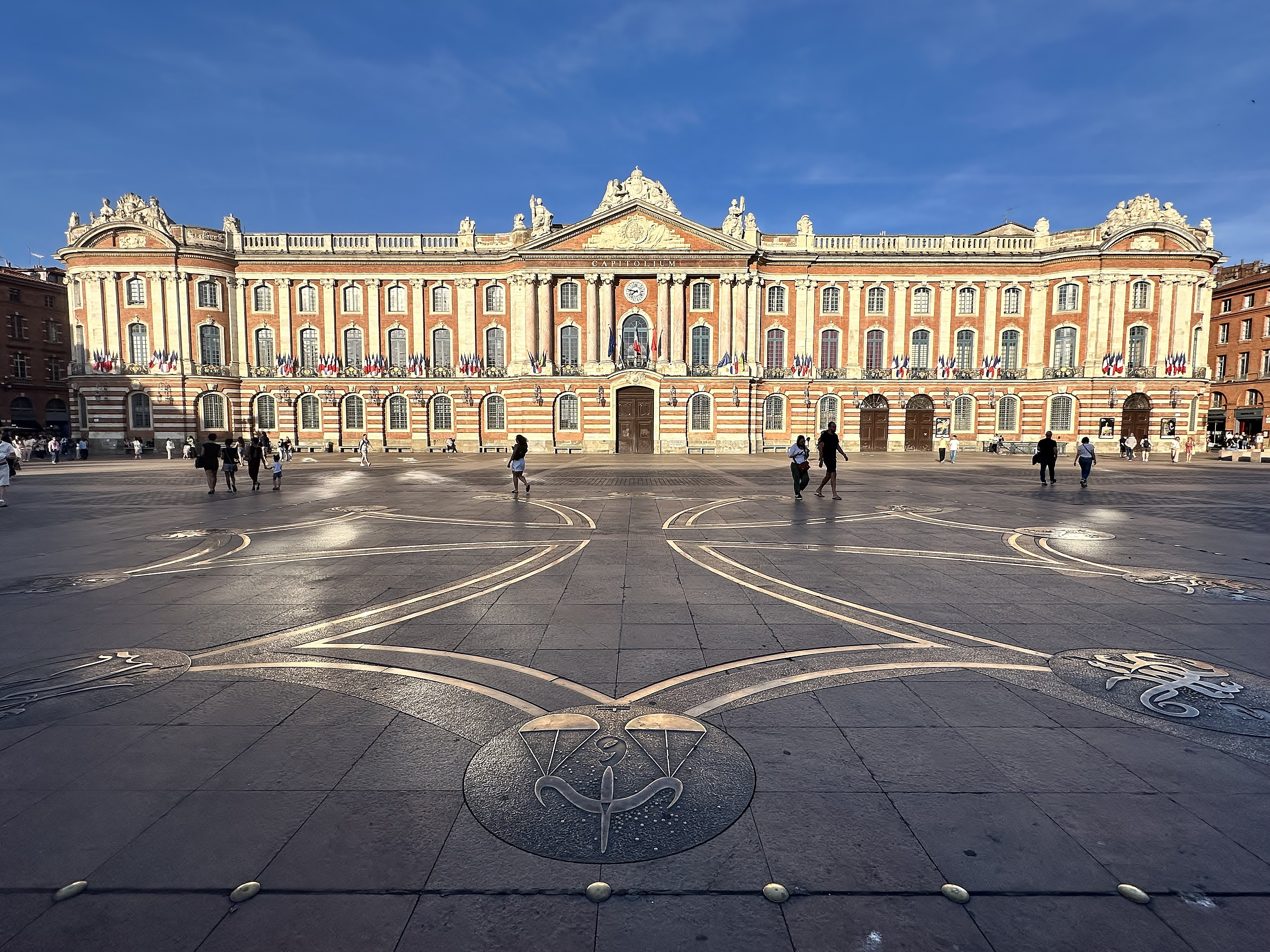
Toulouse's city hall, the Capitole de Toulouse, and the square of the same name with the Occitan cross designed by Raymond Moretti on the ground

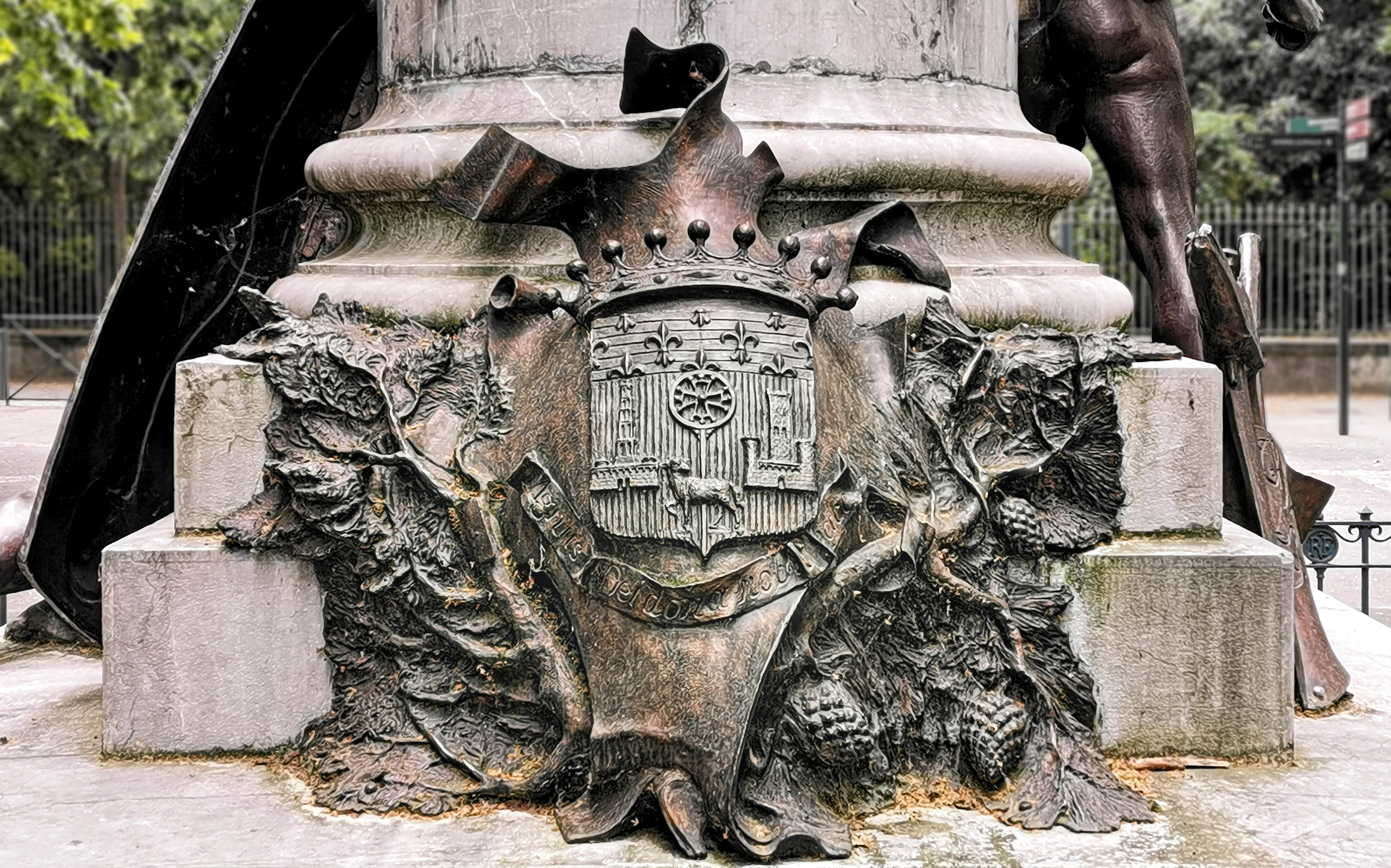
Coats of arms of Toulouse: Saint-Sernin church and Comtal castle frame a paschal lamb bearing the Toulouse cross

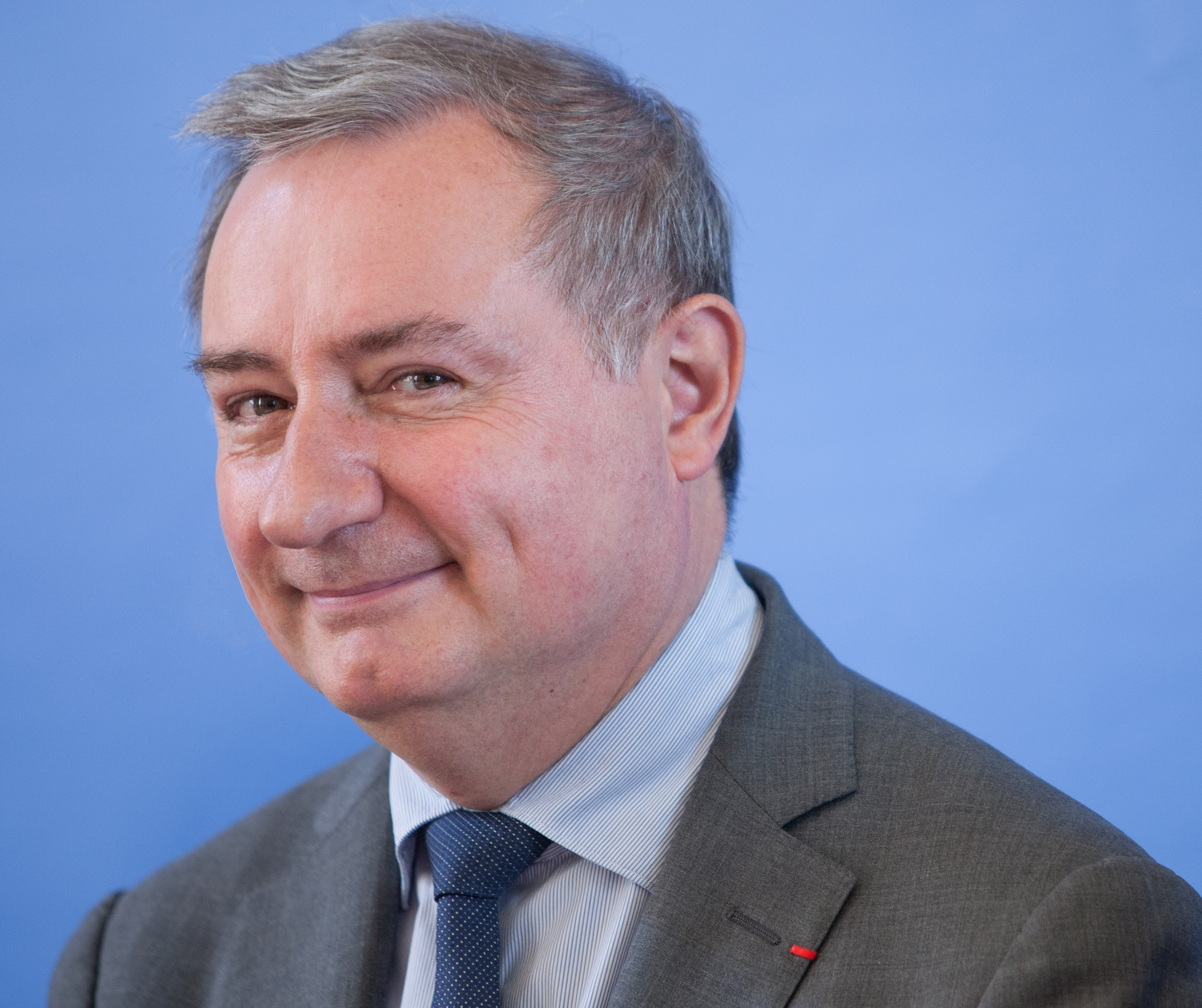
Jean-Luc Moudenc, mayor of Toulouse

One of the major political figures in Toulouse was Dominique Baudis, the mayor of Toulouse between 1983 and 2001, member of the centrist UDF. First known as a journalist known for his coverage of the war in Lebanon, 36-year-old Dominique Baudis succeeded his father Pierre Baudis in 1983 as mayor of Toulouse. (Pierre Baudis was mayor from 1971 to 1983.)

Baudis tried to strengthen the international role of Toulouse (such as its Airbus operations), as well as revive the cultural heritage of the city. The Occitan cross, flag of Languedoc and symbol of the counts of Toulouse, was chosen as the new flag of the city, instead of the traditional coat of arms of Toulouse (which included the fleur de lis of the French monarchy). Many cultural institutions were created, in order to attract foreign expatriates and emphasise the city's past. For example, monuments dating from the time of the counts of Toulouse were restored, the city's symphonic concert hall (Halle aux Grains) was refurbished, a city theater was built, a Museum of Modern Art was founded, the Bemberg Foundation (European paintings and bronzes from the Renaissance to the 20th century) was established, a huge pop music concert venue (Zénith, the largest in France outside Paris) was built, the space museum and educational park Cité de l'Espace was founded, etc.

To deal with growth, major housing and transportation projects were launched. Line A of the underground was opened in 1993, and line B opened in 2007. The creation of a system of underground car parking structures in Toulouse city centre was sharply criticised by the Green Party.

In 2000, Dominique Baudis was at the zenith of his popularity, with approval rates of 85%. He announced that he would not run for a fourth (6-year) term in 2001. He explained that with 3 terms he was already the longest-serving mayor of Toulouse since the French Revolution; he felt that change would be good for the city, and that the number of terms should be limited. He endorsed Philippe Douste-Blazy, then UDF mayor of Lourdes as his successor. Baudis has since been appointed president of the CSA (Conseil supérieur de l'audiovisuel) in Paris, the French equivalent of the American FCC.

Philippe Douste-Blazy narrowly won in the 2001 elections, which saw the left making its best showing in decades. Douste-Blazy had to deal with a reinvigorated political opposition, as well as with the dramatic explosion of the AZF plant in late 2001.

In March 2004, he entered the national government, and left Toulouse in the hands of his second-in-command Jean-Luc Moudenc, elected mayor by the municipal council. In March 2008, Moudenc was defeated by the Socialist Party's candidate Pierre Cohen.

At the next elections in 2014 Moudenc defeated Cohen in a rematch to re-take the job with more than 52% of the votes, and he was re-elected with almost the same score in 2020. On March 22, 2026, Moudenc was re-elected for a third consecutive term with 53.87% of the vote.

=== Mayors ===
Mayor	Term start	Term end	Party
Raymond Badiou	1944	September 1958	SFIO
G. Carrère	September 1958	16 October 1958	SFIO
Louis Bazerque	16 October 1958	1971	SFIO
Pierre Baudis	March 1971	March 1983	UDF
Dominique Baudis	March 1983	23 January 2001	UDF
Guy Hersant	23 January 2001	23 March 2001	UDF
Philippe Douste-Blazy	23 March 2001	30 April 2004	UDF
Françoise de Veyrinas	30 April 2004	6 May 2004	UMP
Jean-Luc Moudenc	6 May 2004	17 March 2008	UMP
Pierre Cohen	17 March 2008	4 April 2014	PS
Jean-Luc Moudenc	4 April 2014	incumbent	UMP

== Sights and architecture ==
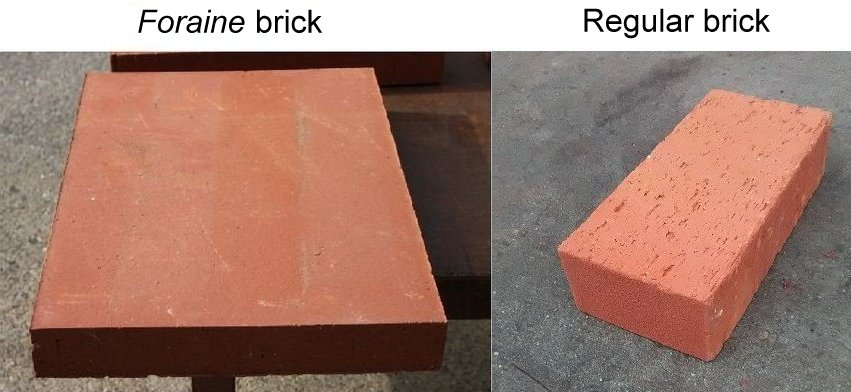
Format differences between a "foraine" brick and a standard brick

Classified as a "City of Art and History", Toulouse has an architectural heritage spanning several periods, including Romanesque and Gothic churches, Renaissance mansions, and Neoclassical buildings such as the Capitole. Much of the city's historic architecture is concentrated within the 220-hectare area enclosed by the inner boulevards, which forms part of its protected historic centre.

Almost all the buildings of the historical centre were made with the traditional building material of the region: the foraine brick (French: brique foraine) that has earned the city the nickname of Ville rose (Pink city). Medieval heir to the Roman brick, the foraine brick is characterised by its large dimensions, its flat appearance and its colour ranging from orange/pink to red.

White stone is also present in smaller quantities. As there were no stone quarries near Toulouse, it was transported from the Pyrenees via the Garonne river and was for a long time rare and therefore expensive, considered in Toulouse as a luxury material. However, it is enough to give Toulouse's architecture one of its characteristics: red/white polychromy.

=== Romanesque architecture (11th–12th c.) ===
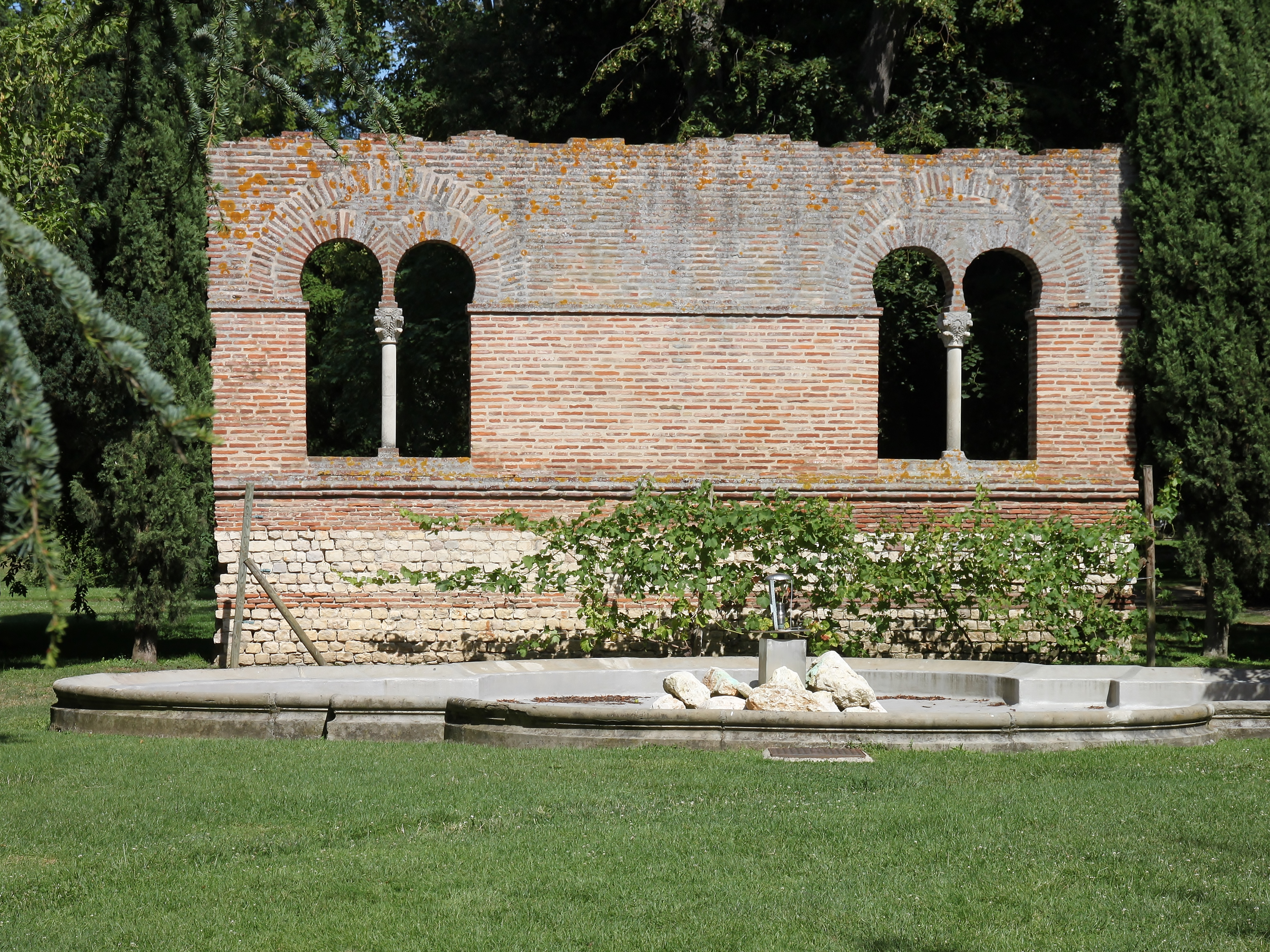
Remains of a Romanesque brick wall in the Jardin des Plantes

The Romanesque architecture of Toulouse is largely dominated by the presence of the Basilica of Saint-Sernin, one of the most important churches of its time in Europe, and fortunate enough to keep its Romanesque character virtually intact.

==== Basilica of Saint-Sernin ====
Basilica of Saint-Sernin, part of the Way of Saint James UNESCO World Heritage Site, was also in itself a major place of pilgrimage. It is one of the two largest surviving Romanesque churches in Europe. (Note: Speyer cathedral is slightly larger, but unlike Saint-Sernin this church has been largely destroyed and rebuilt in its history, so the question of which is the largest remaining Romanesque church depends on the criteria chosen as to Romanesque character.) With more than two hundred relics (including that of Saint Saturnin who gave his name to the church), many of which were donated by Charlemagne to the shrine that preceded the present church, Saint-Sernin is the church with the most relics after Saint Peter of Rome.

Conceived from the outset as a gigantic reliquary, the church was mainly built at the end of the 11th century and at the beginning of the 12th century to welcome the crowds of pilgrims, its double-sided aisles and the ambulatory surrounding the apse make it the archetype of the great pilgrimage church, where pilgrims could make the circuit around the church and were able to stop for meditation and prayer at the apsidal chapels of the transept and the radiating chapels of the choir. The church is also particularly noteworthy for the quality of its Romanesque sculptures, including numerous capitals and the historiated tympanum of the Miègeville gate, one of the first of its kind.

Basilica of Saint-Sernin

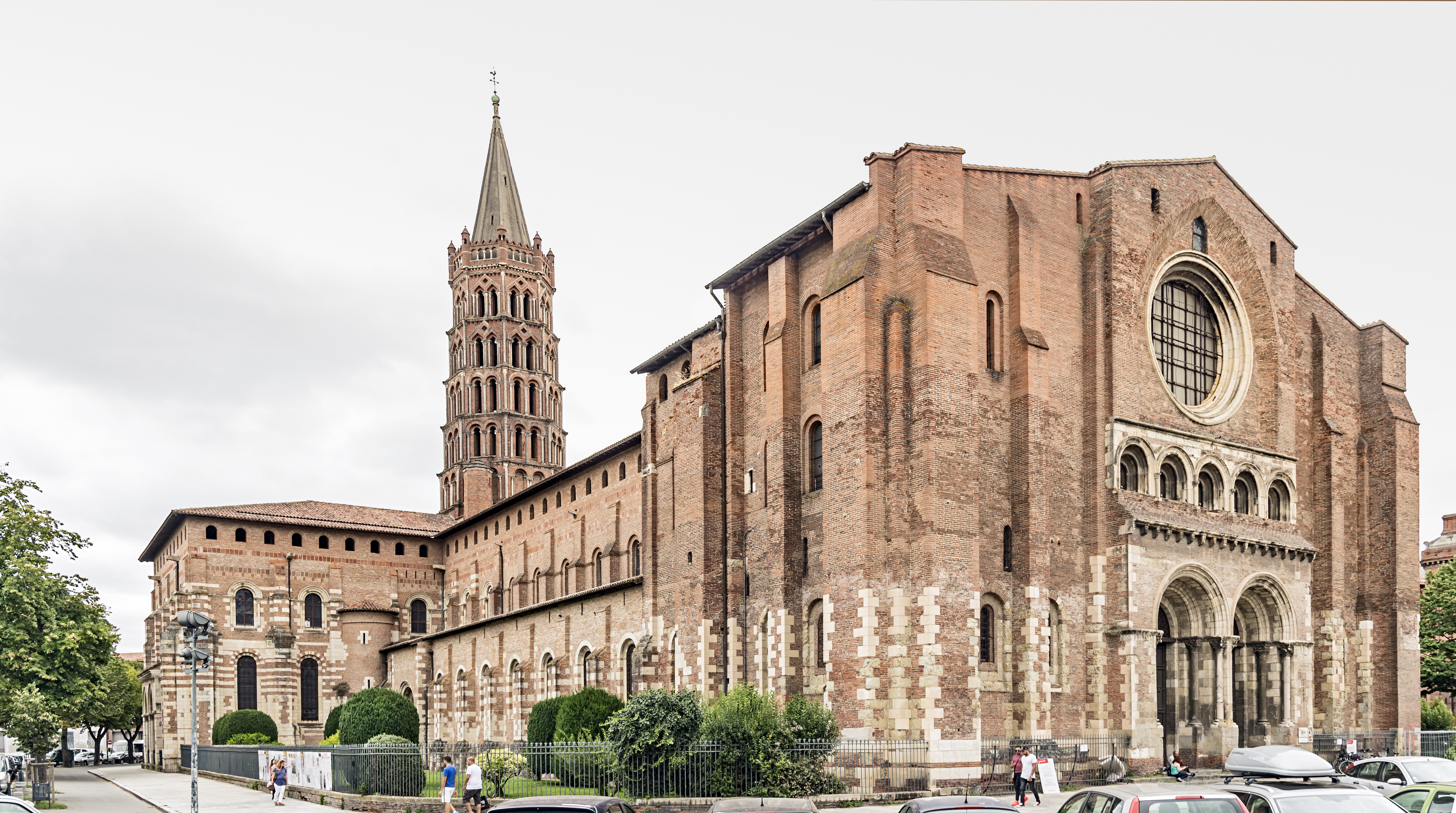
Basilica of Saint-Sernin

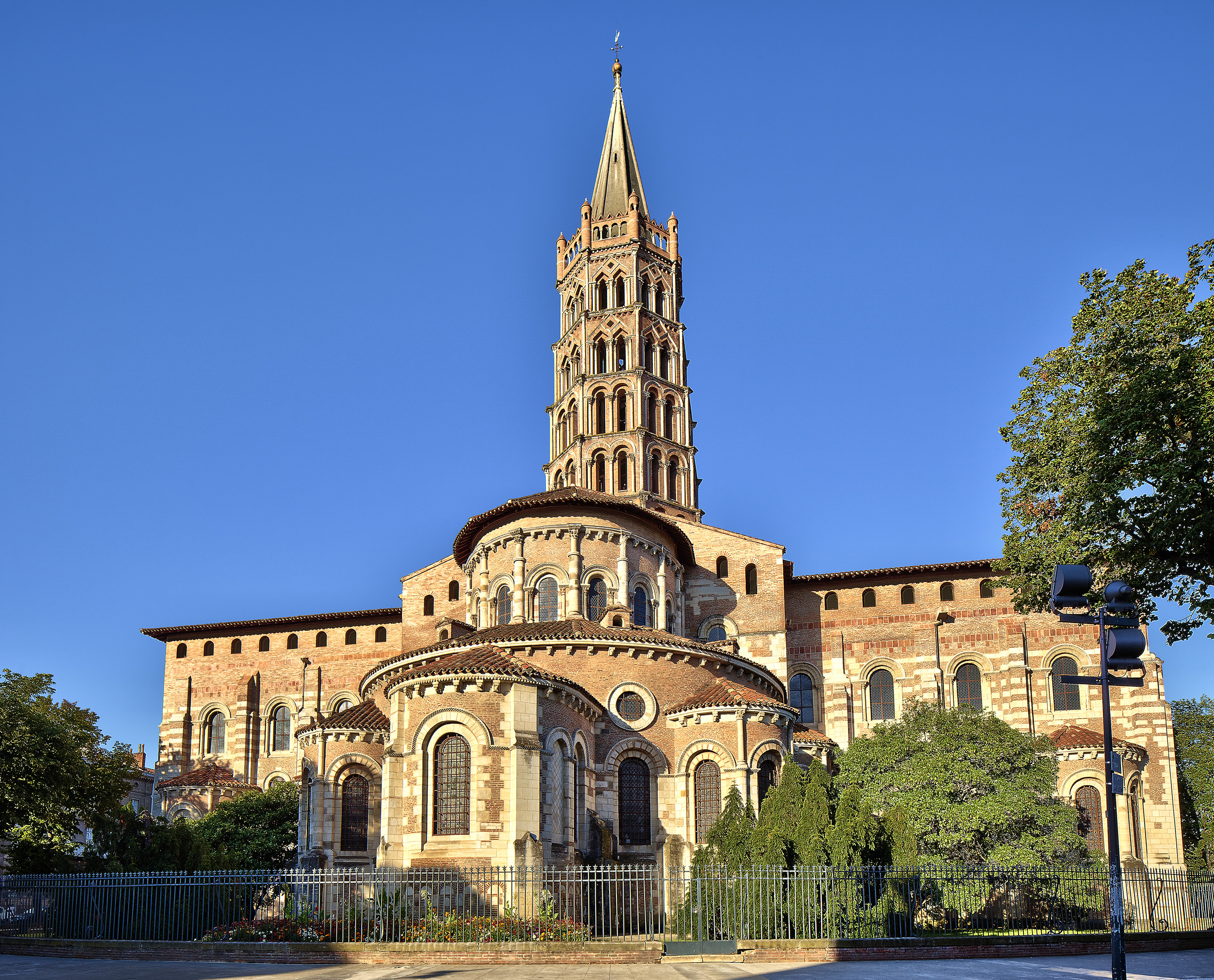
The east side is the oldest part.

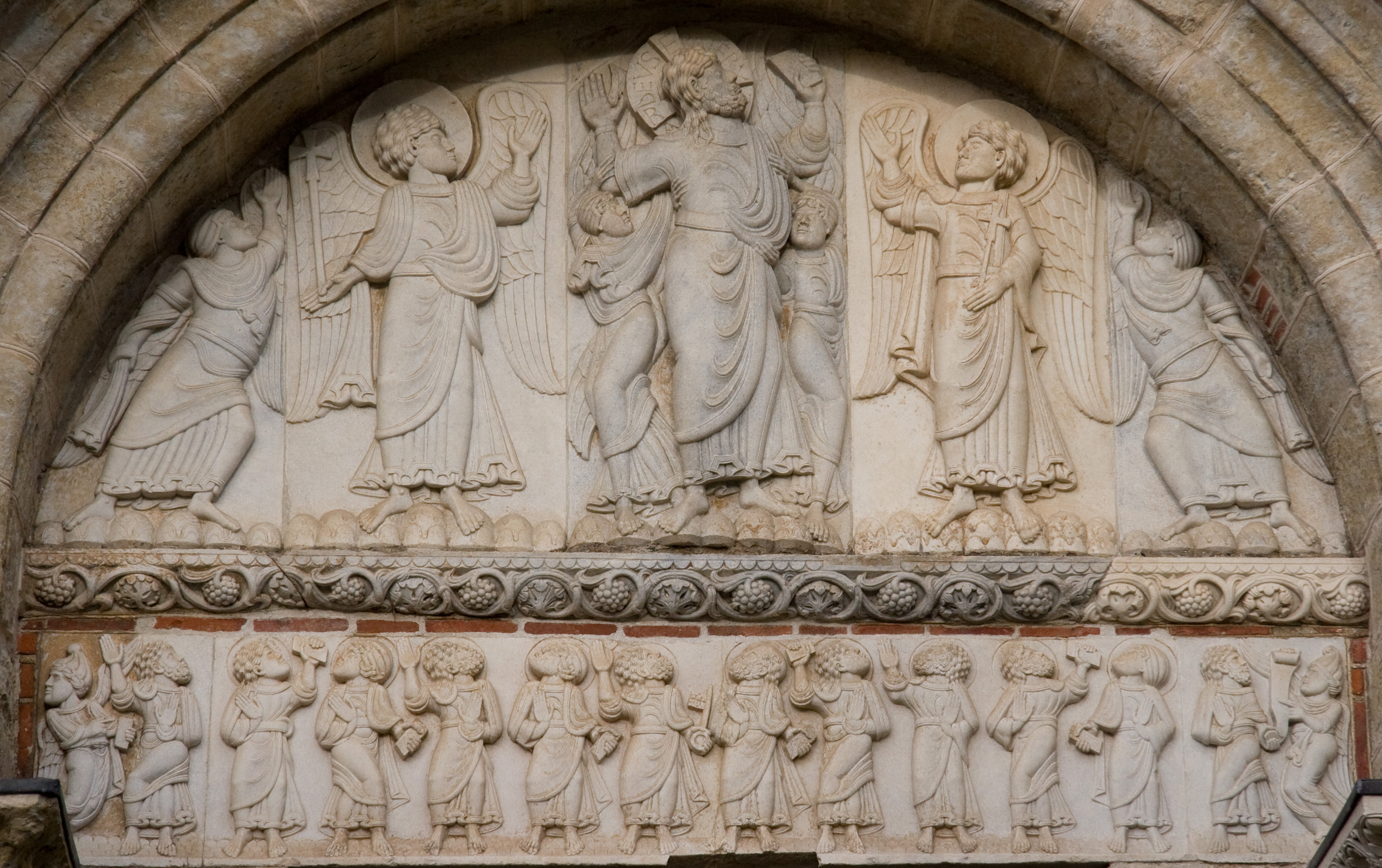
Romanesque tympanum of Miègeville gate (late 11th c. or early 12th c.)

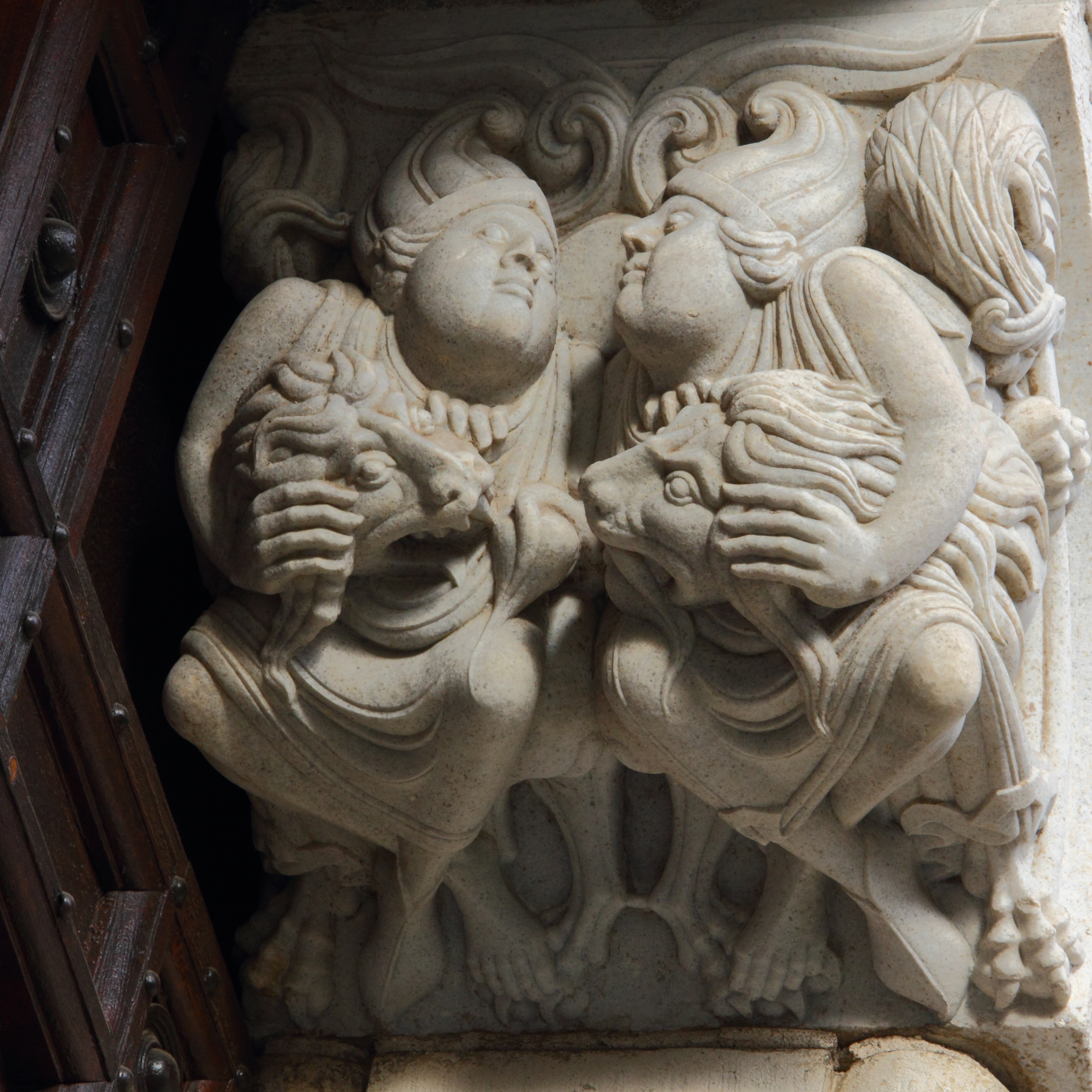
Romanesque sculptures

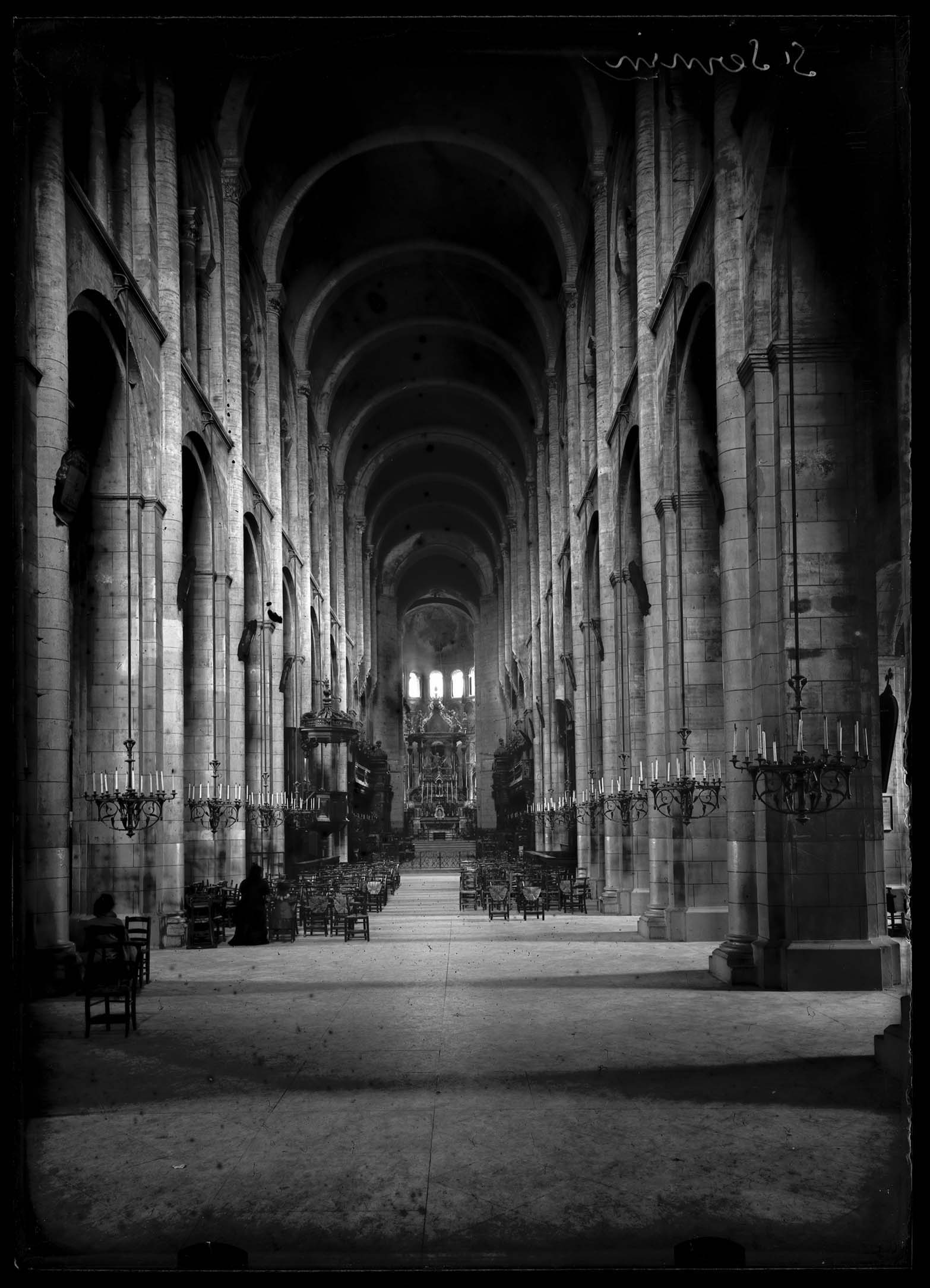
The central nave of the church

=== Gothic architecture (13th c.-early 16th c.) ===
==== Southern French Gothic: a militant religious architecture ====
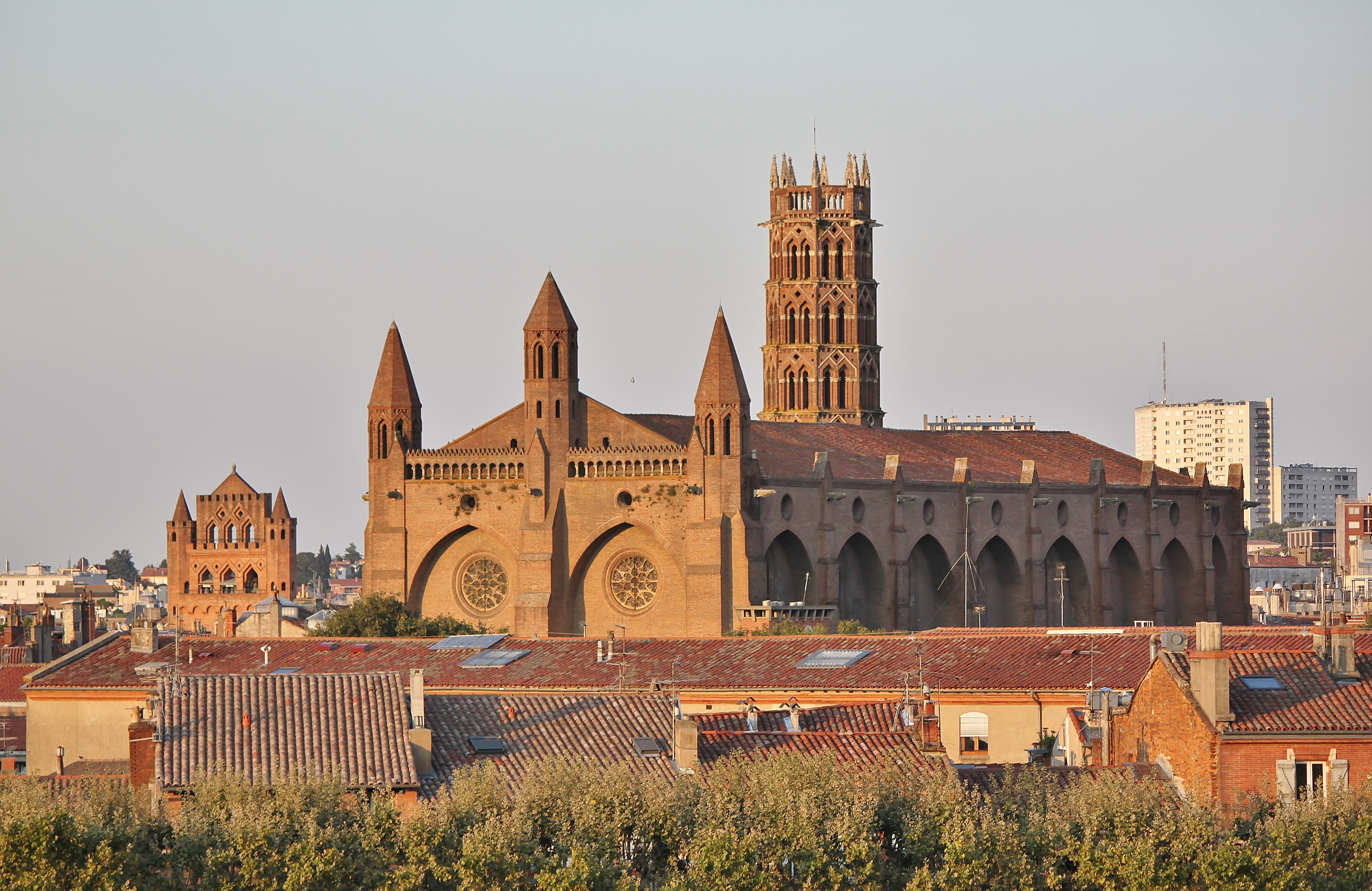
Southern French Gothic bell towers and churches

At the beginning of the 13th century, the Catholic clergy of the South of France, seeing a growing number of the faithful turning to the Catharism which advocated a more pious austerity, showed the will to correct the defects of the Catholic Church which indulged in luxury. Under the impulse of the bishop of Toulouse, Foulques, an austere and militant architectural style was born with the reconstruction of the Cathedral of Toulouse: the Southern French Gothic. Conceived according to an ideal of poverty and humility to bring the faithful together in a single, vast nave to facilitate preaching, this architectural style then developed during the 13th century in the grand mendicant convents of the city, before spreading in the 14th century to a large number of churches and cathedrals in the region.

Several churches or convents in Toulouse belong to this architectural trend, but two of them are particularly symbolic and remarkable:

- Cathedral of Saint-Étienne (Saint Stephen) is the seat of the Roman Catholic Archdiocese of Toulouse. Its construction, which was mainly done at the beginning and then at the end of the 13th century, reflects the history of this decisive century which saw the city lose its independence to become a French city. The single nave is the first example of Southern French Gothic, at 19 metres wide it probably was at its completion the widest in Western Europe (1210–1220). The higher choir that adjoins it was built in the Gothic style of northern France shortly after the city became part of the Crown of France in 1271.
- Convent of the Jacobins (13th century / early 14th century) was the Dominican convent of Toulouse and is considered to be, together with the Albi Cathedral, the pinnacle of Southern French Gothic architecture. Like all Southern French Gothic churches it has a deliberately austere exterior, but on the inside its alignment of cylindrical columns form one of the tallest colonnades ever erected in Gothic architecture (28 metres high). The masterpiece of this church is the column that closes the choir (1275–1292), its palm tree shape was a hundred years ahead of the flamboyant gothic fan vaults. Because he thought that the bones of Saint Thomas Aquinas deserved «the most beautiful and most splendid surroundings», in 1368 Pope Urban V made the church of the Jacobins the burial place of the famous Dominican friar, one of the most notable philosophers and theologians of the Middle Ages.
Southern French Gothic religious architecture

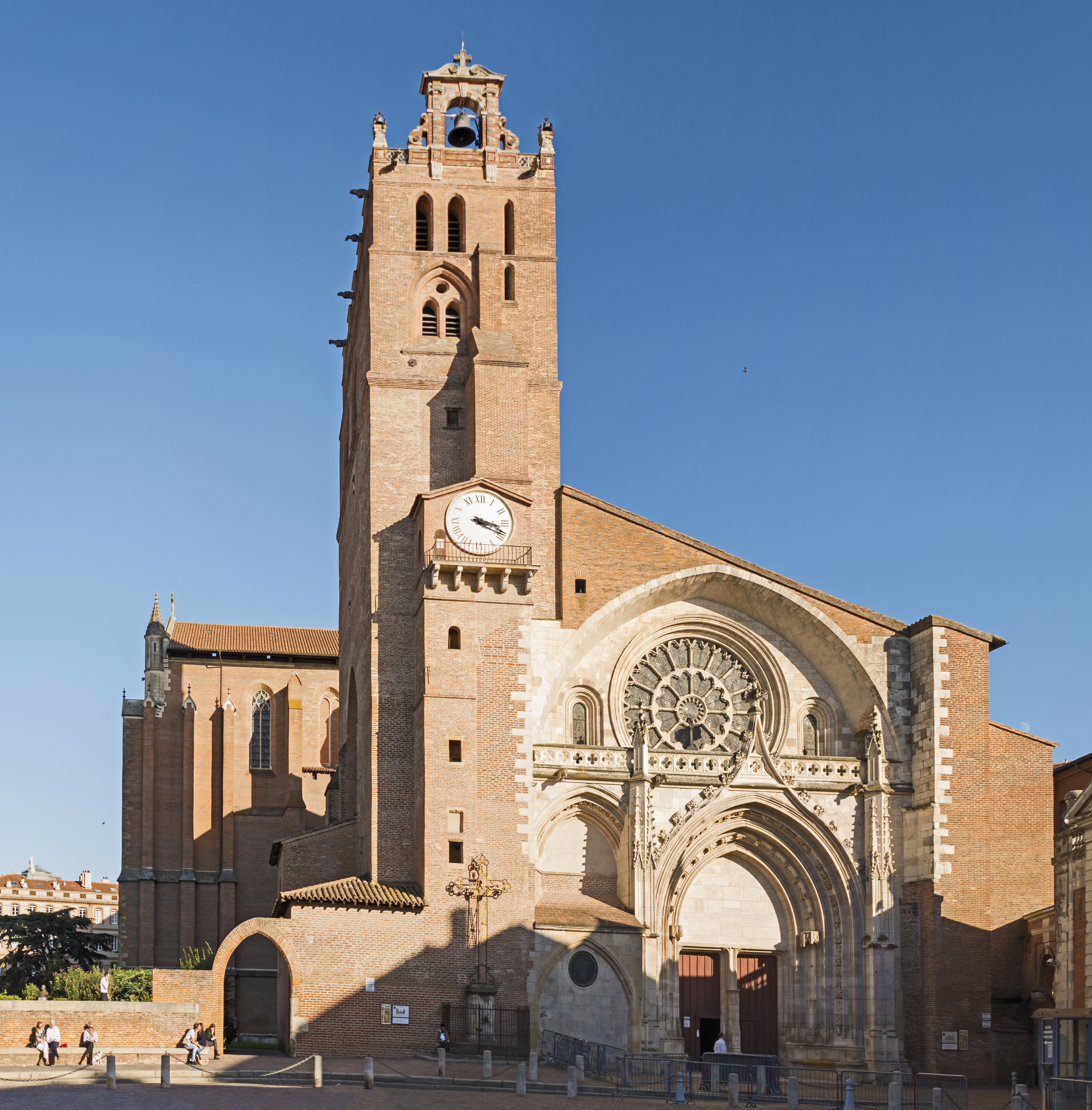
Toulouse cathedral

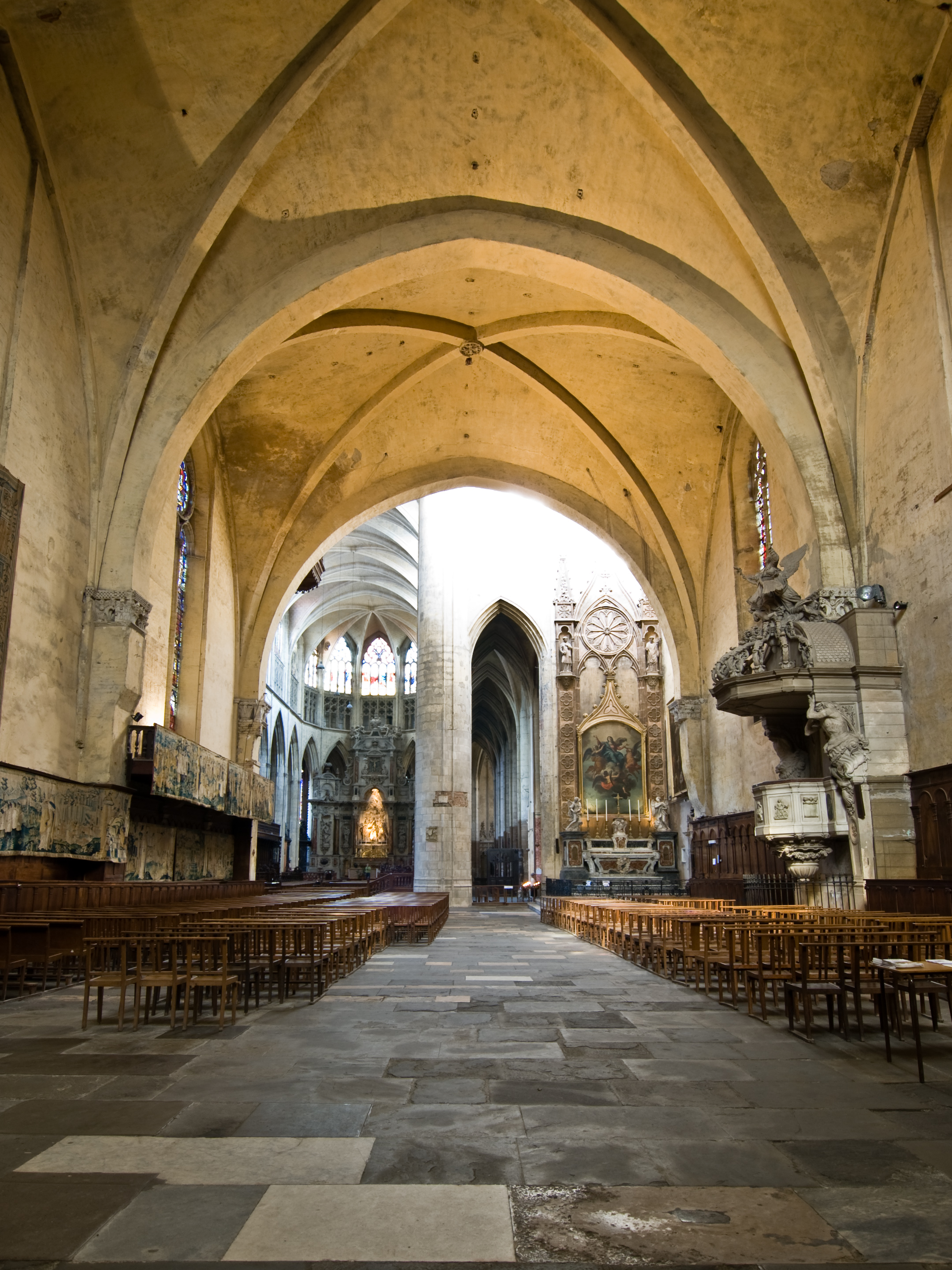
Southern French Gothic nave and northern Gothic choir

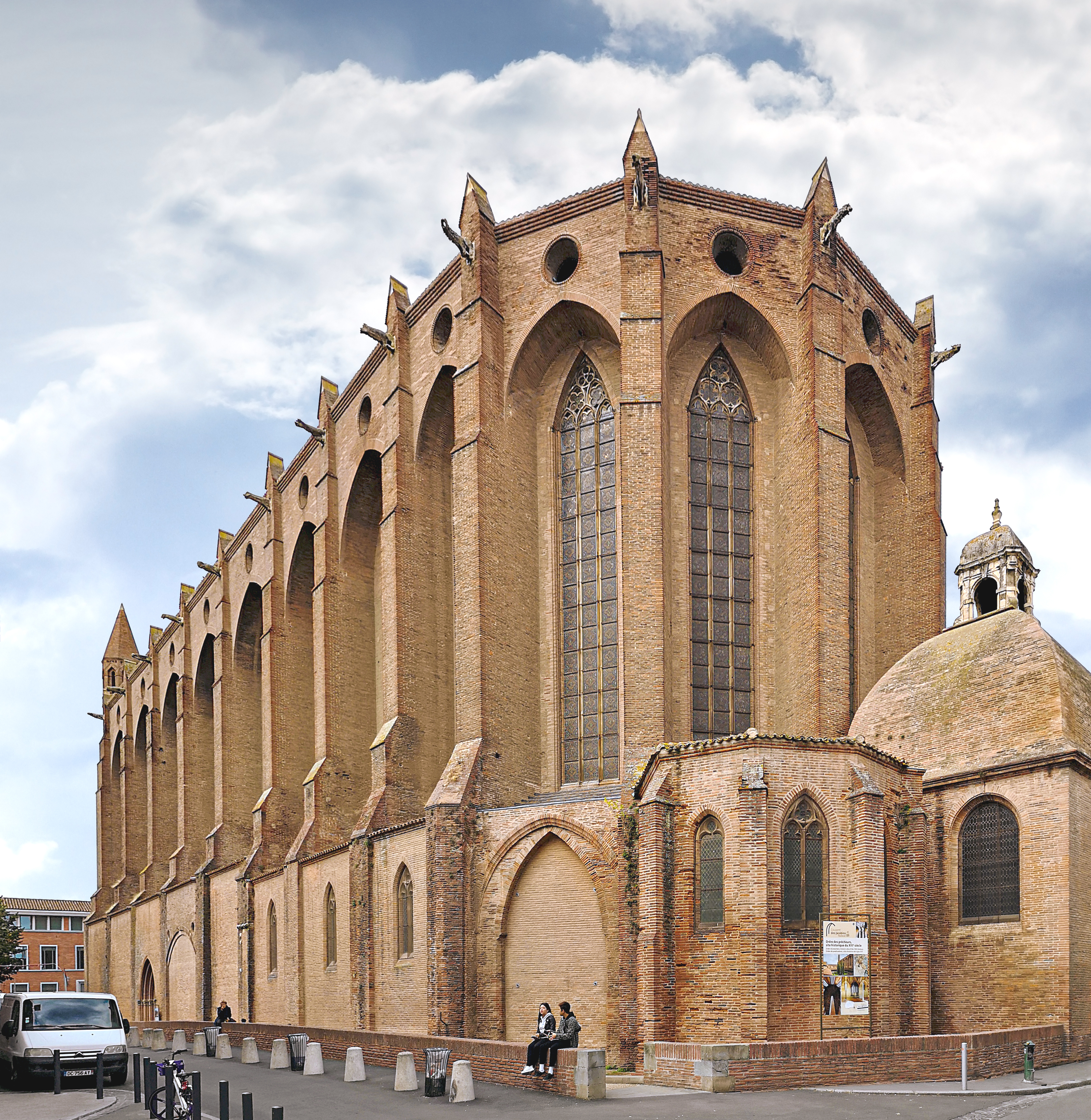
Church of the Jacobins, exterior (13th c.)

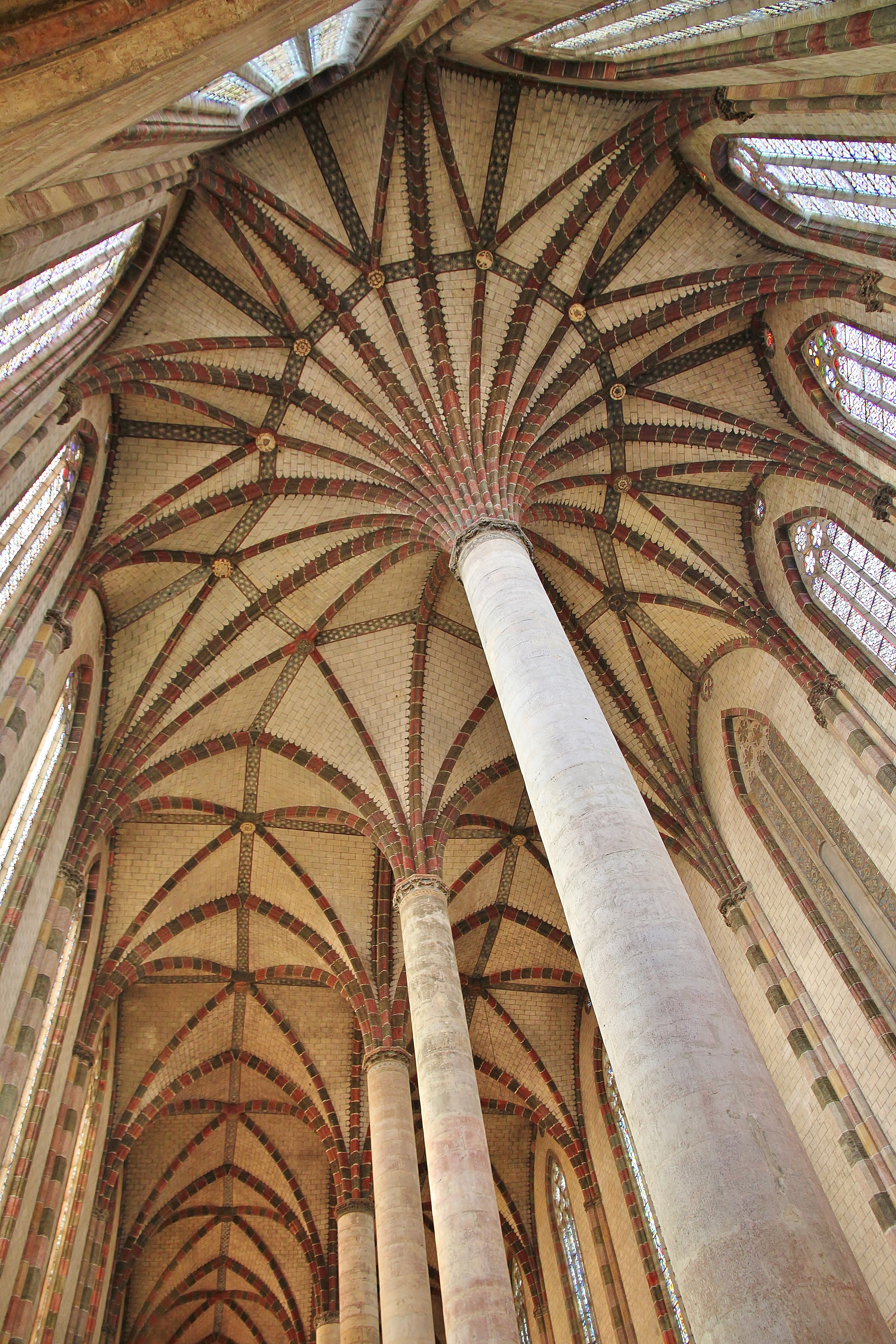
The vault of the Jacobins and its famous palm tree

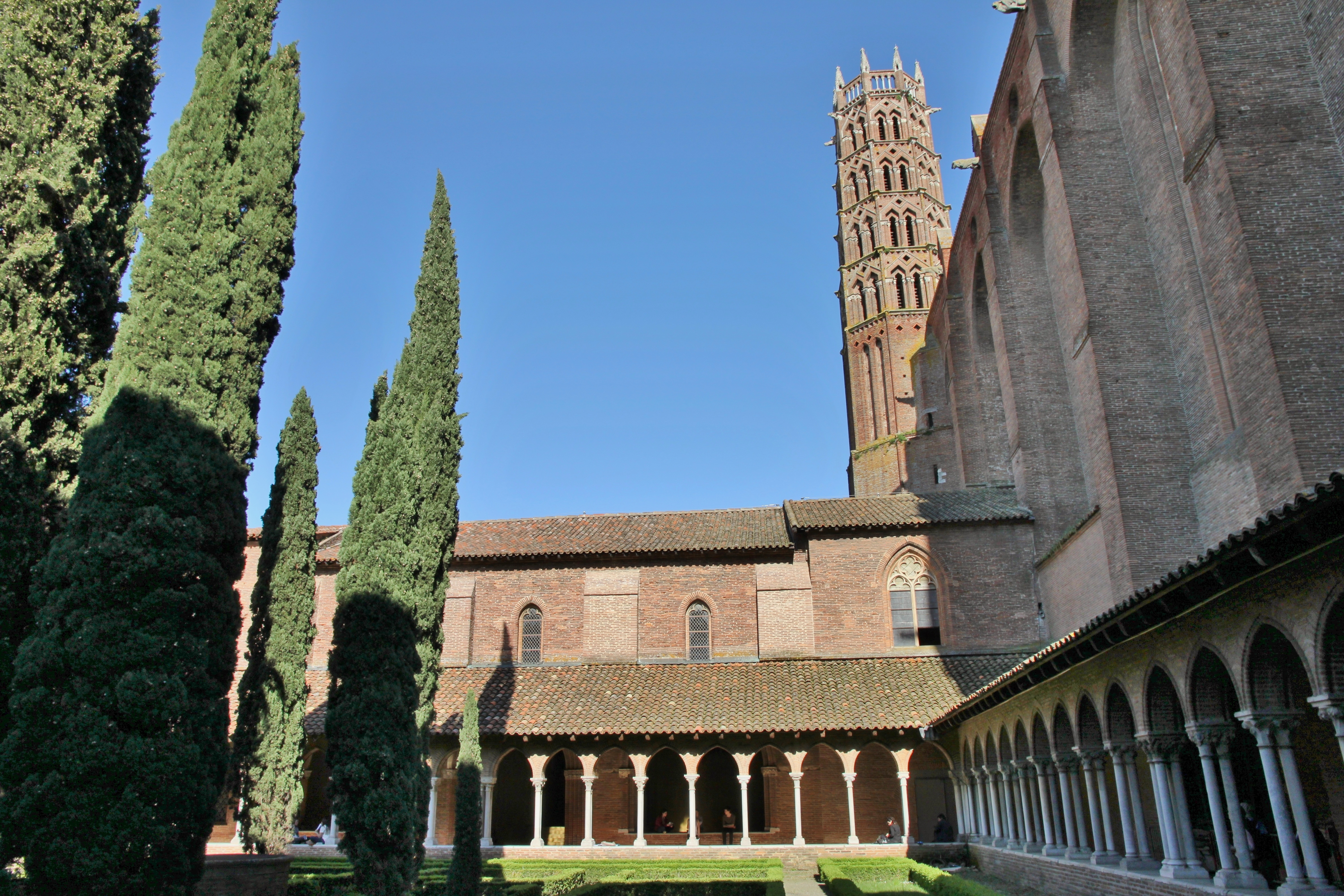
Cloister (14th c.) and bell tower (1298) of the Jacobins

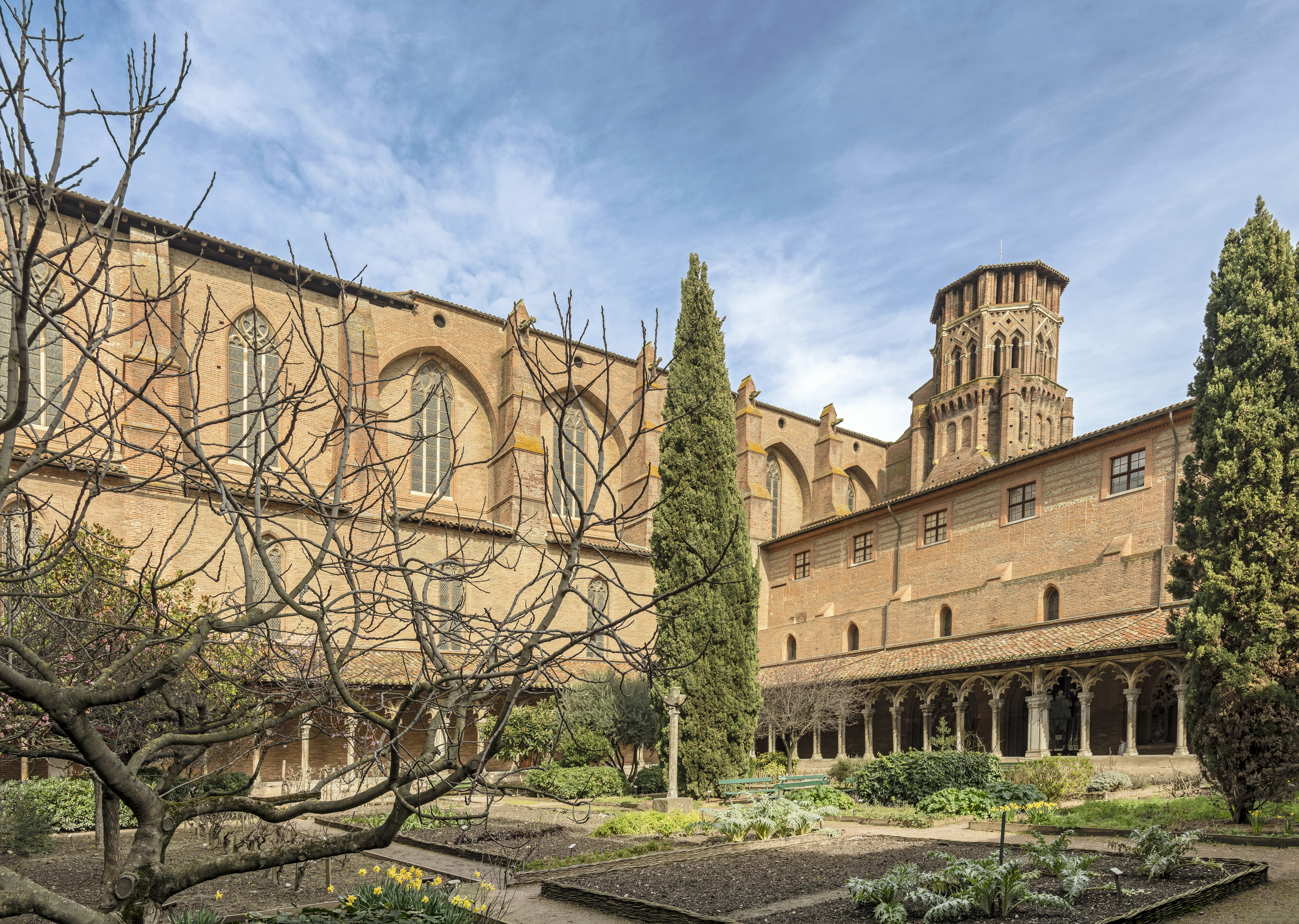
Augustinian Convent (14th c.)

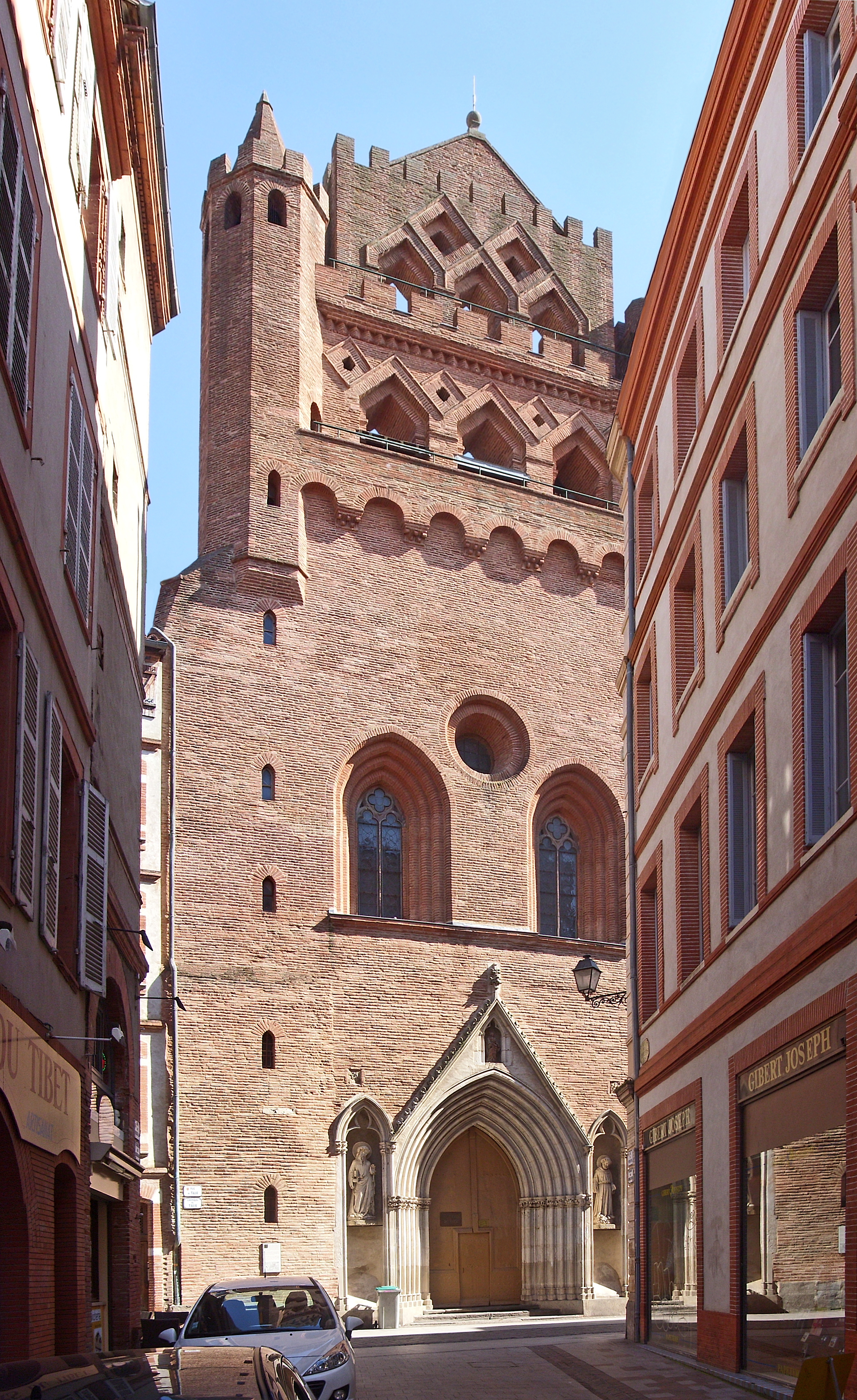
Wall belfry of Notre-Dame du Taur (14th c.)

==== Gothic civil architecture ====
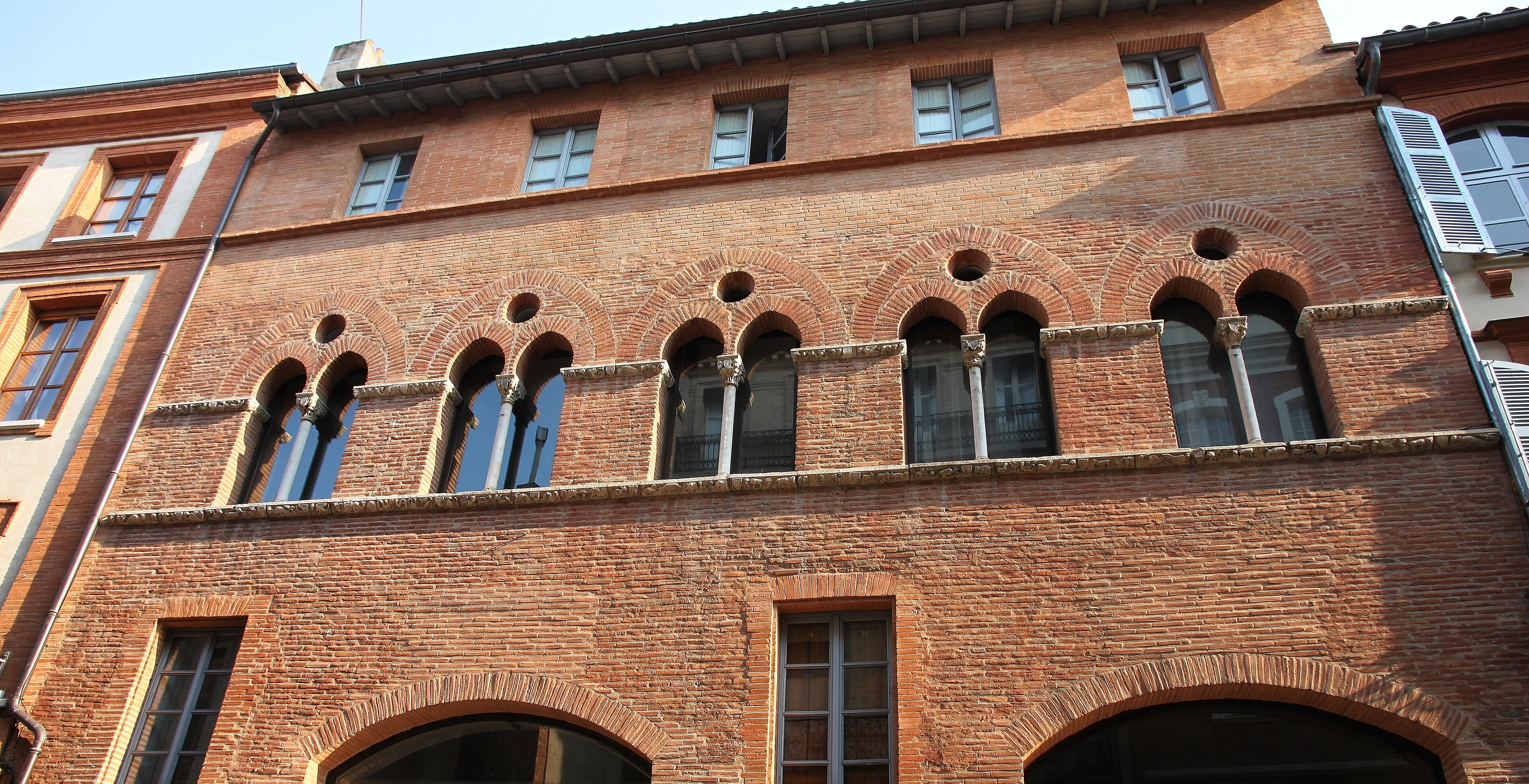
A Gothic house on Rue Croix-Baragnon (c. 1310)

Toulouse has preserved about thirty Gothic stair towers (plus a dozen Renaissance or later towers), the remains of private mansions (called hôtels particuliers) from the Middle Ages and the early 16th century. Often hidden in courtyards, some of these towers are high enough to exceed their function of serving the floors and display the ambition of their owners.

At a time when most of the houses in Toulouse were built in wood or cob, the brick construction of these towers and hôtels also testifies to their quality.

Gothic civil architecture

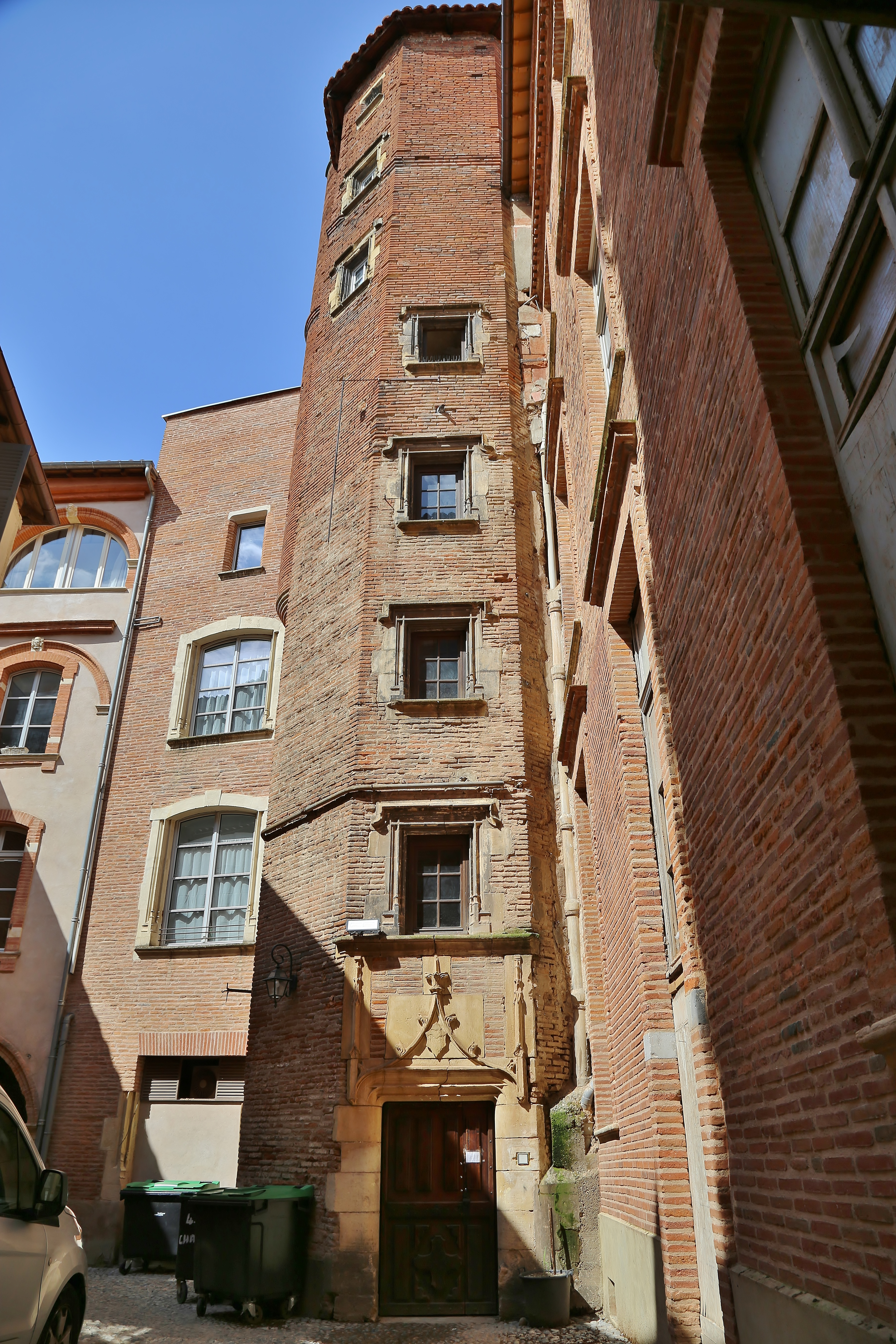
Séguy tower, 1477

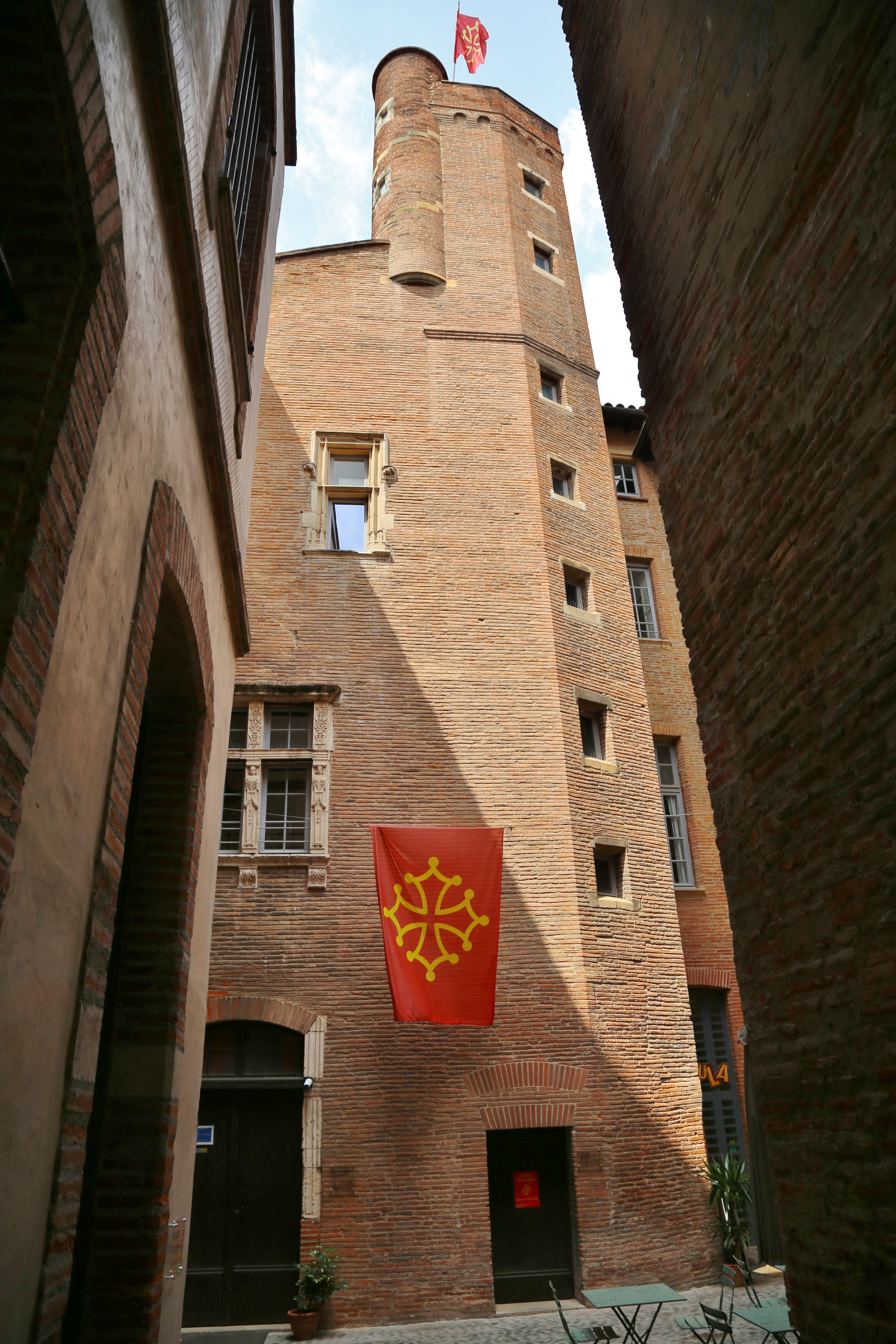
Boysson tower, 1478

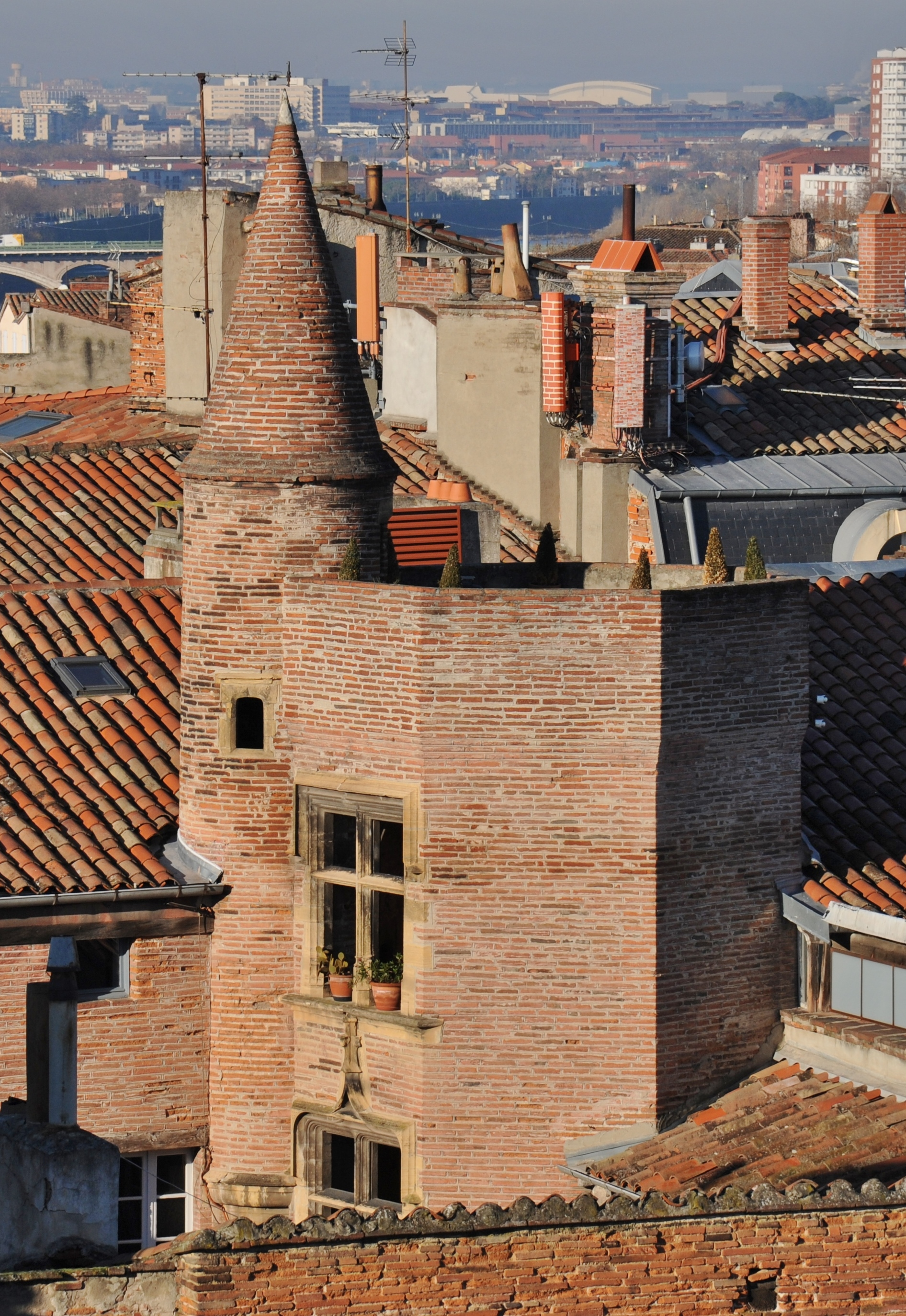
Delfau tower, 1497

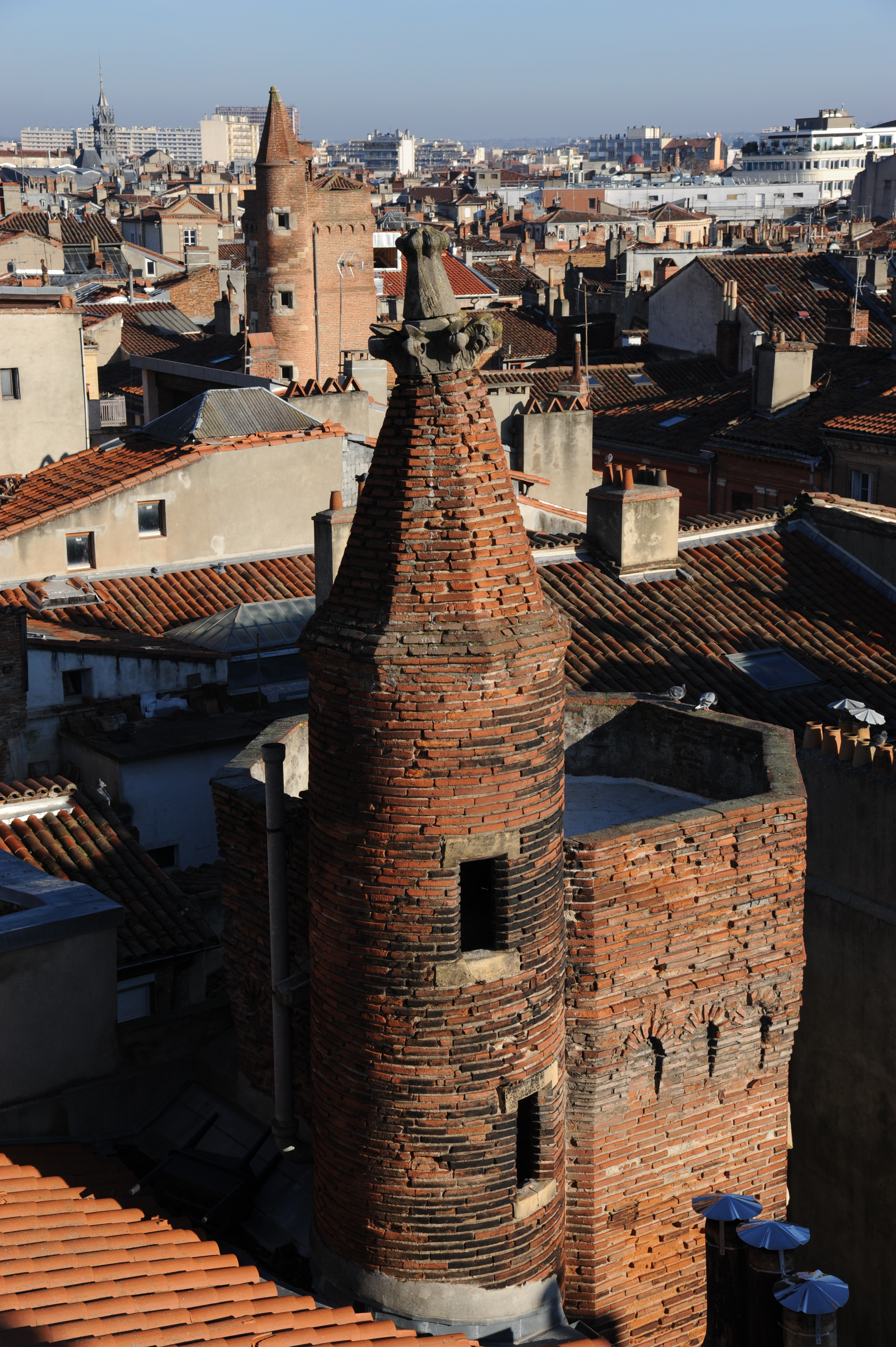
Lancefoc tower (late 15th c.) and Serta tower (1529)

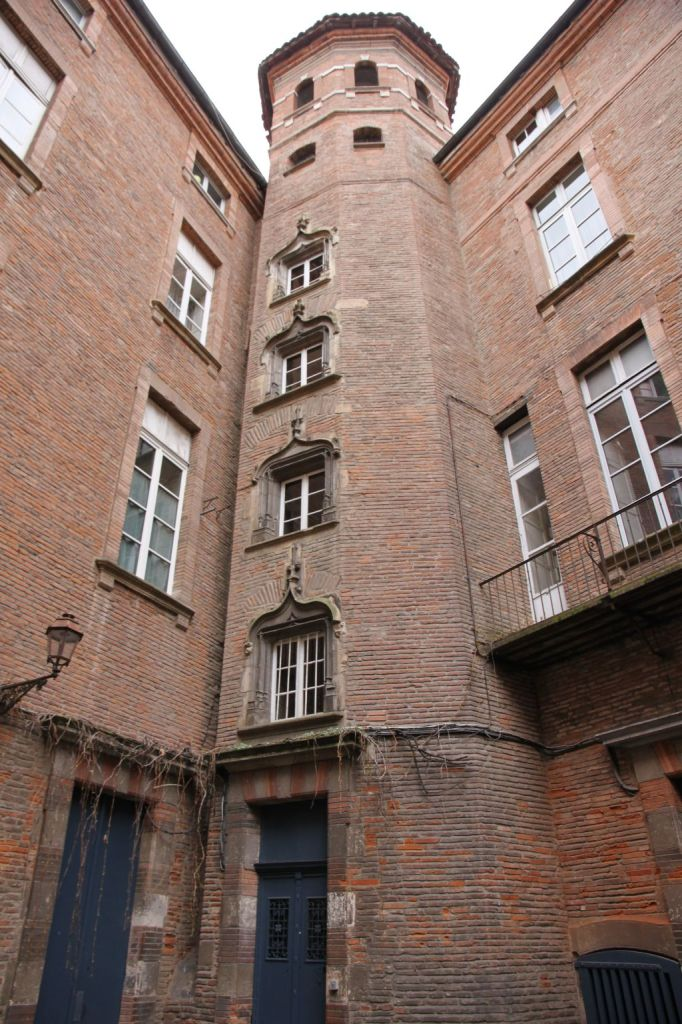
Olmières tower, 1503

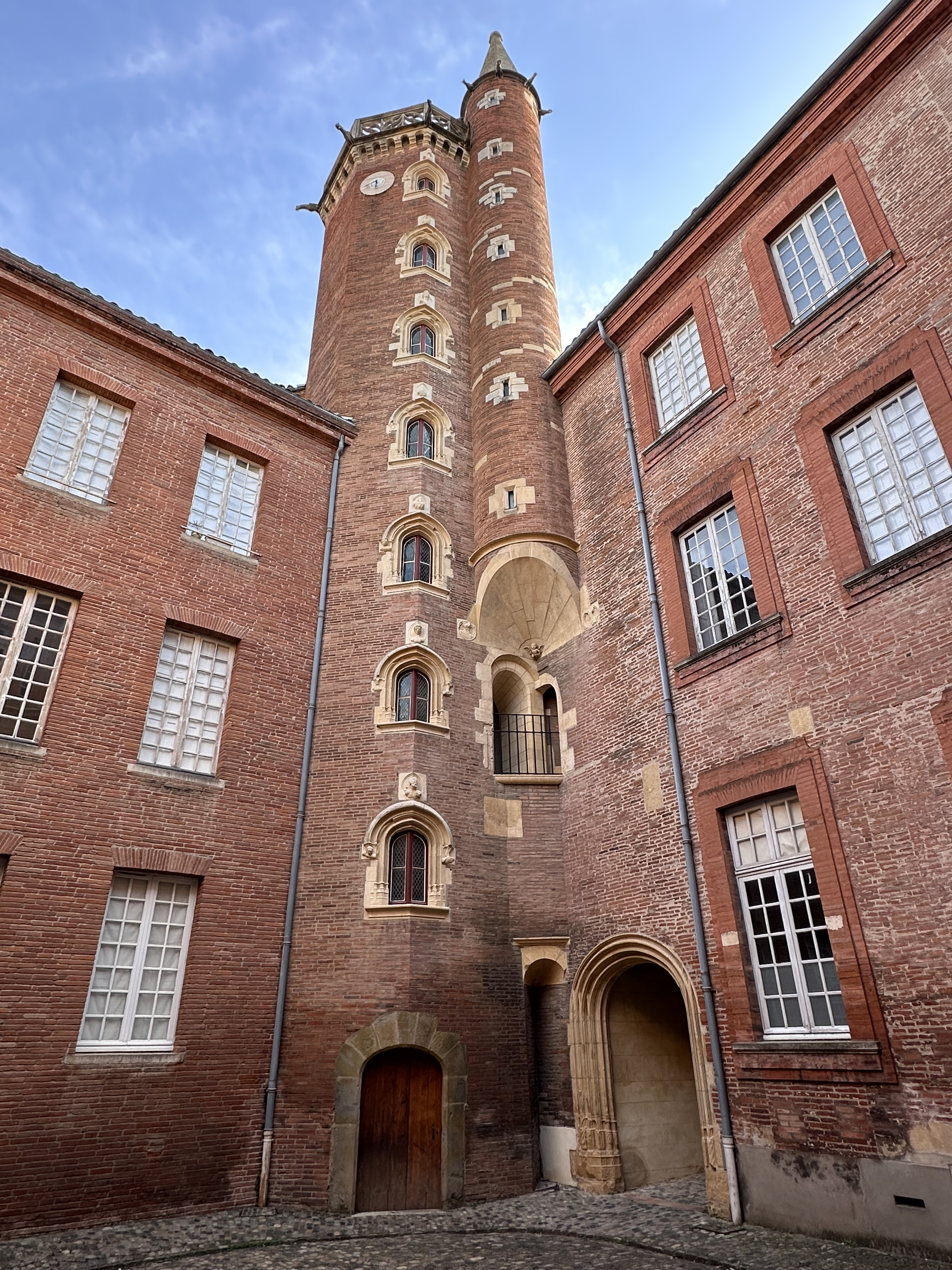
Bernuy tower, 1504

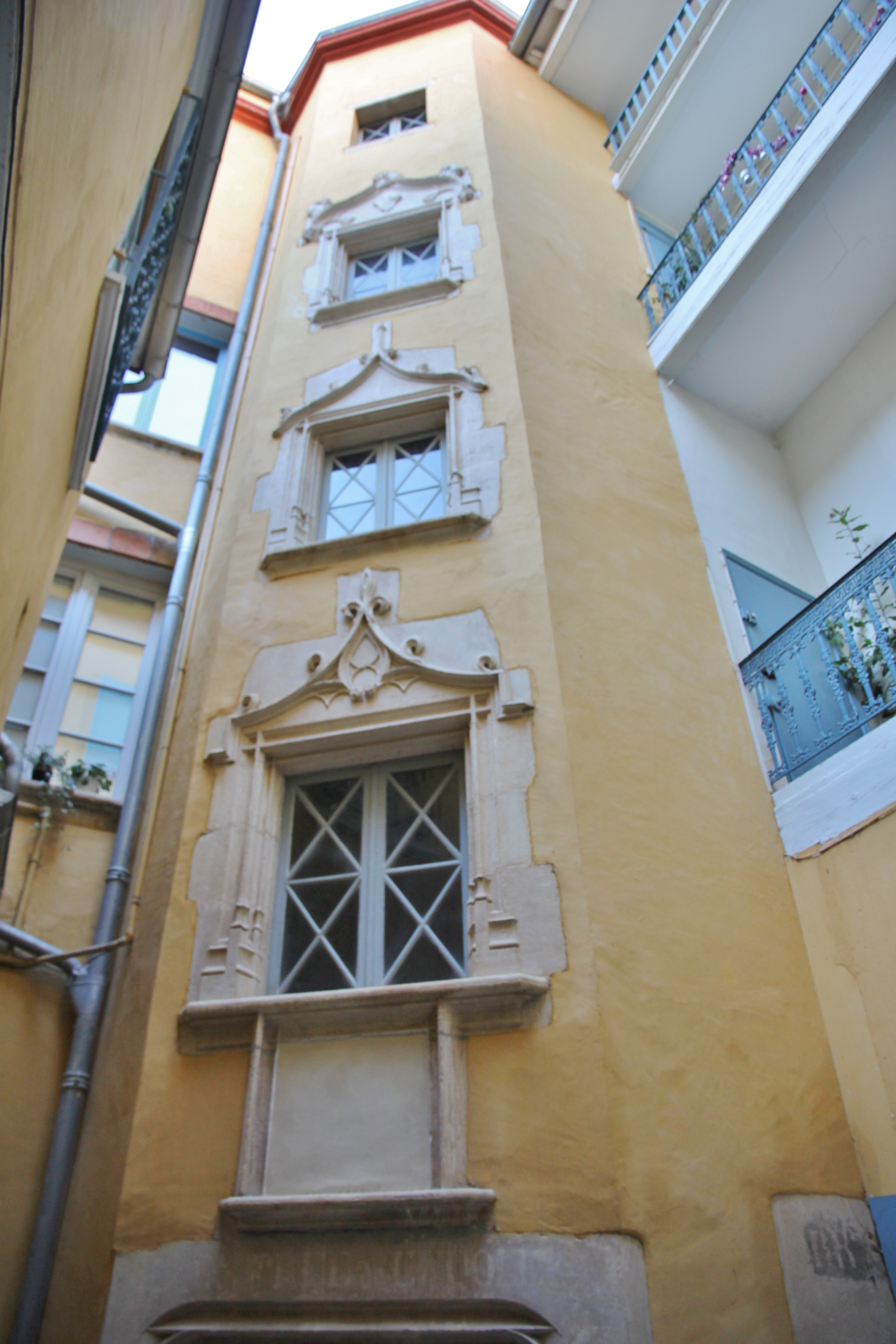
Bruni tower, 1510

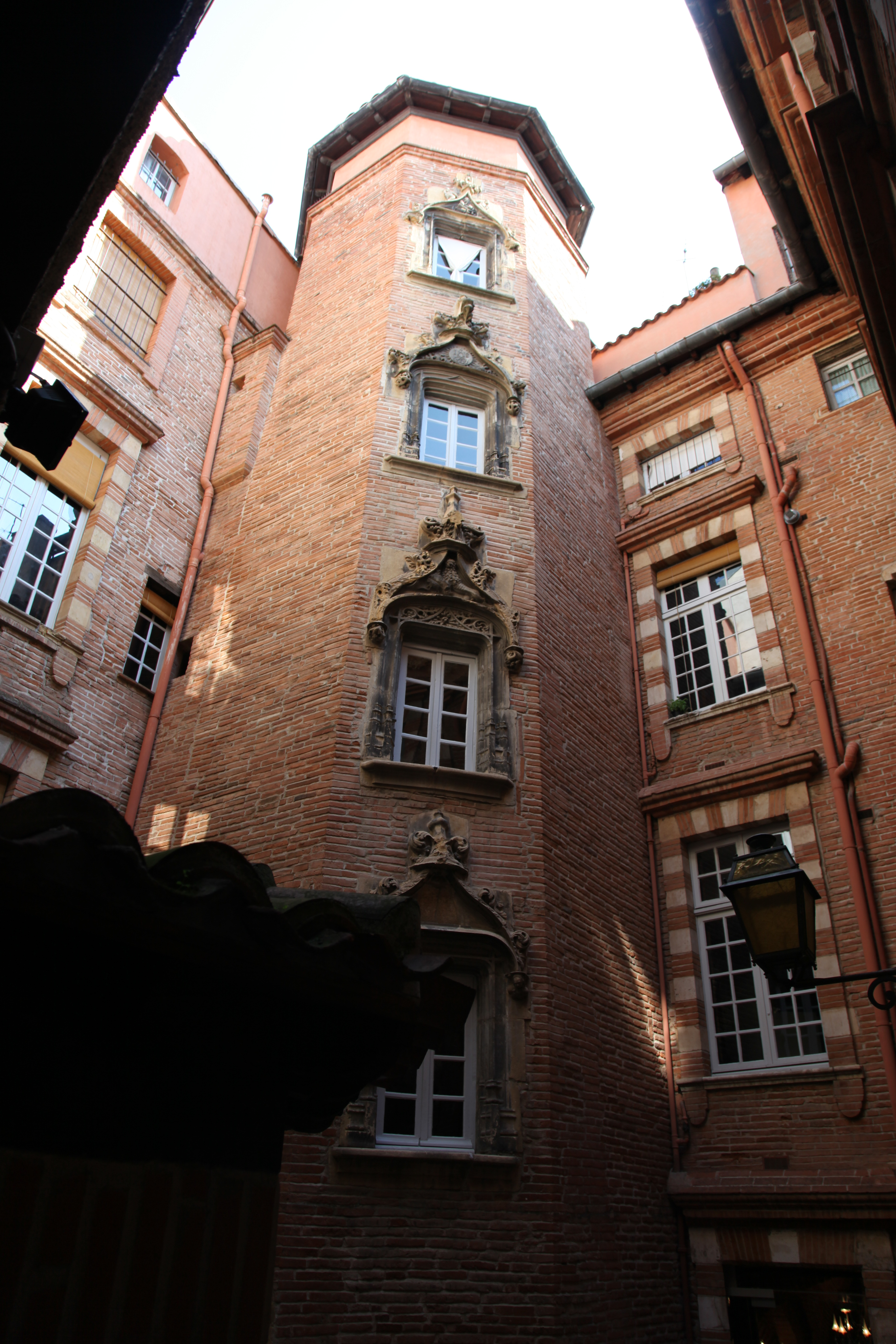
Beringuier Bonnefoy tower, 1513

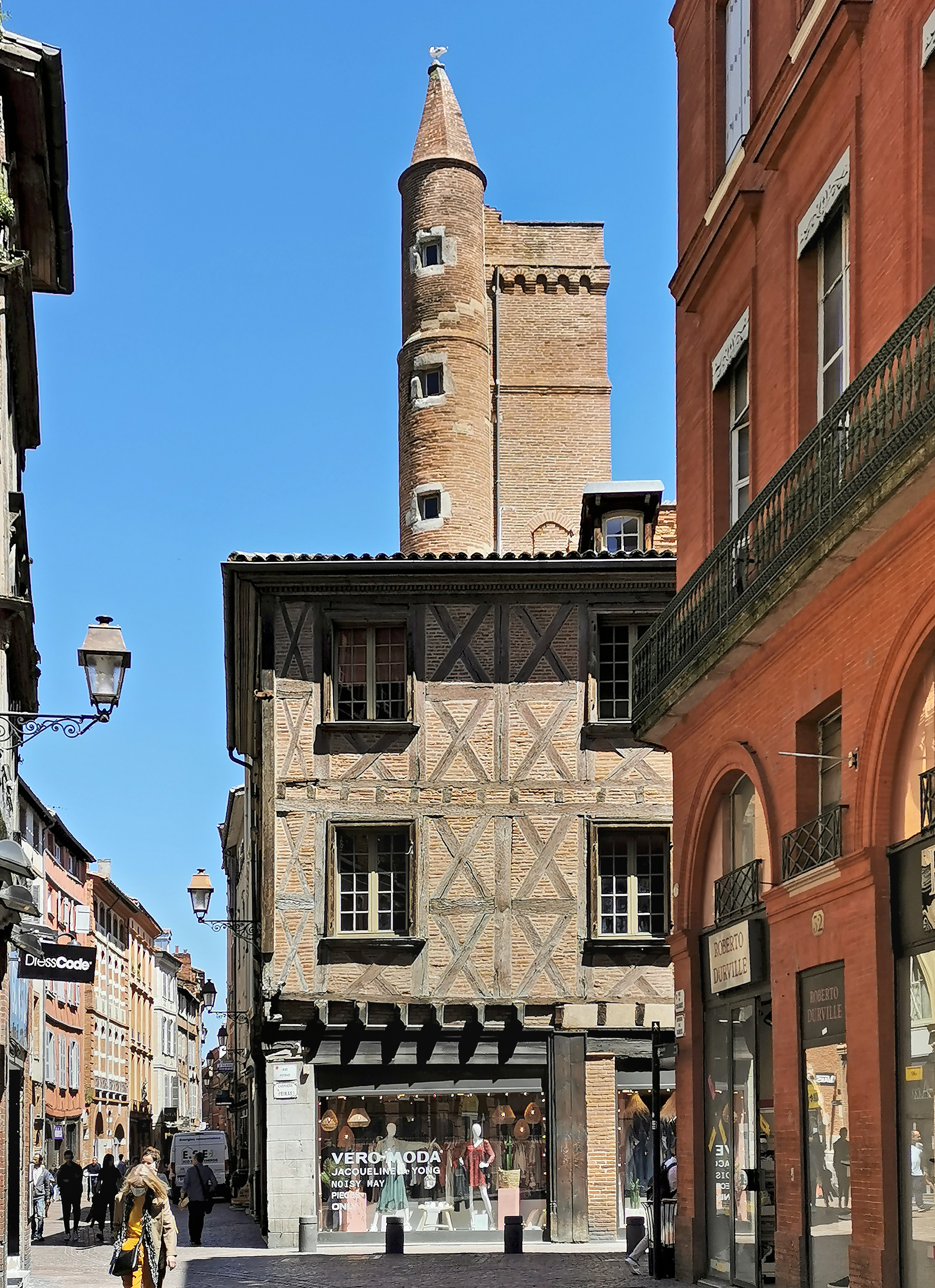
Serta tower, 1529

=== Renaissance architecture (16th c.-early 17th c.) ===
In the 16th century, Toulouse experienced a golden age coinciding with the Renaissance in France. The woad trade (pastel) brought merchants of international stature to the city, and the Parlement of Toulouse made the city the judicial capital of a large part of the south of France. These wealthy elites had private mansions built, remarkable for their architecture inspired by architectural treatises such as those of Serlio, Alberti or Vitruvius, but also by the royal castles of the Loire Valley and the Île-de-France.

Renowned for the quality of their architecture, the private mansions of the Toulouse Renaissance that have survived to the present day were built over more than a century (around 1515–1620) by reputed architects such as Louis Privat, Nicolas Bachelier, Dominique Bachelier or Pierre Souffron. Notable examples of these hôtels include those of Assézat, Bernuy, Vieux-Raisin and Clary.

Renaissance private mansions

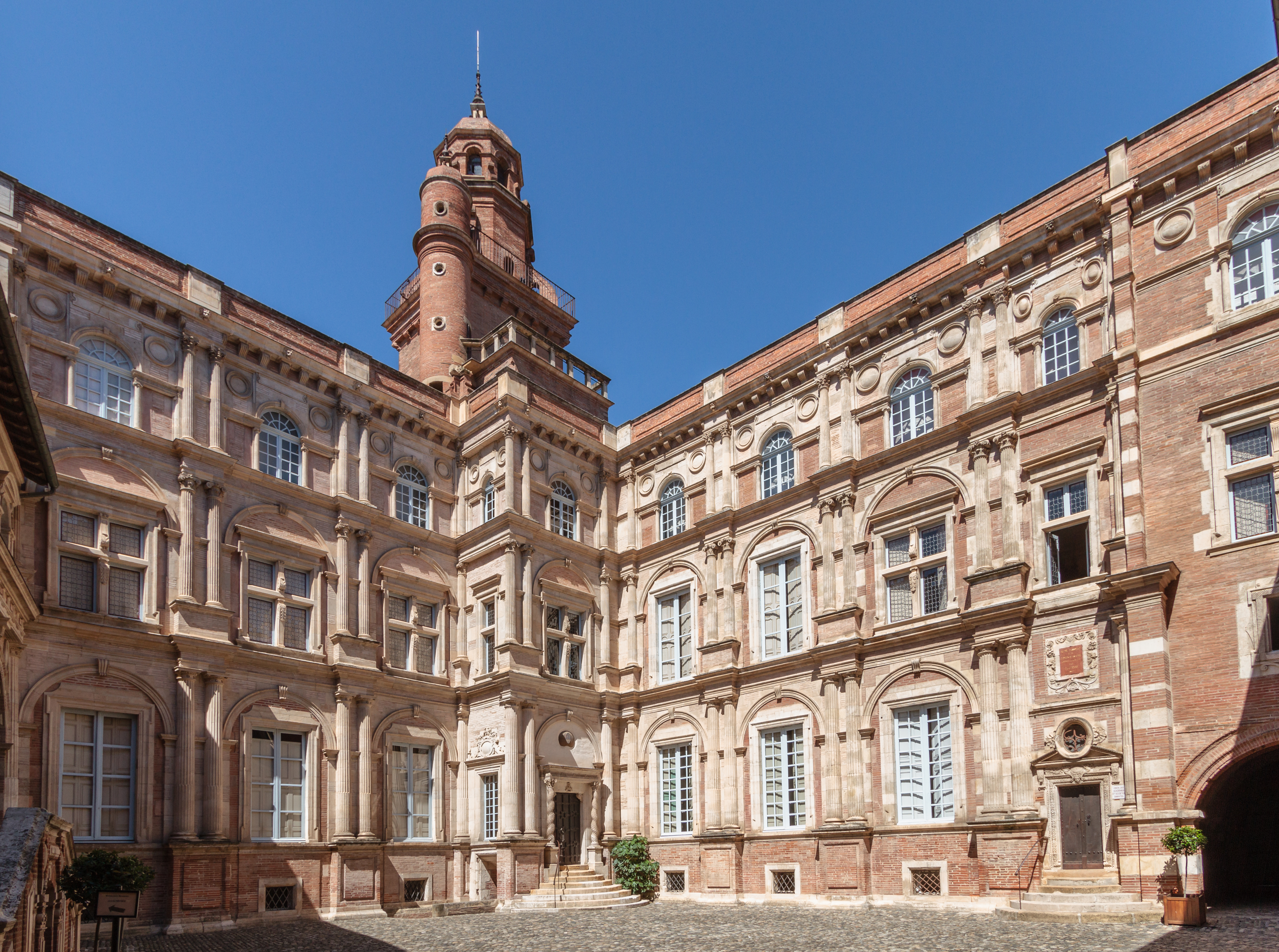
Classical facades of hôtel d'Assézat

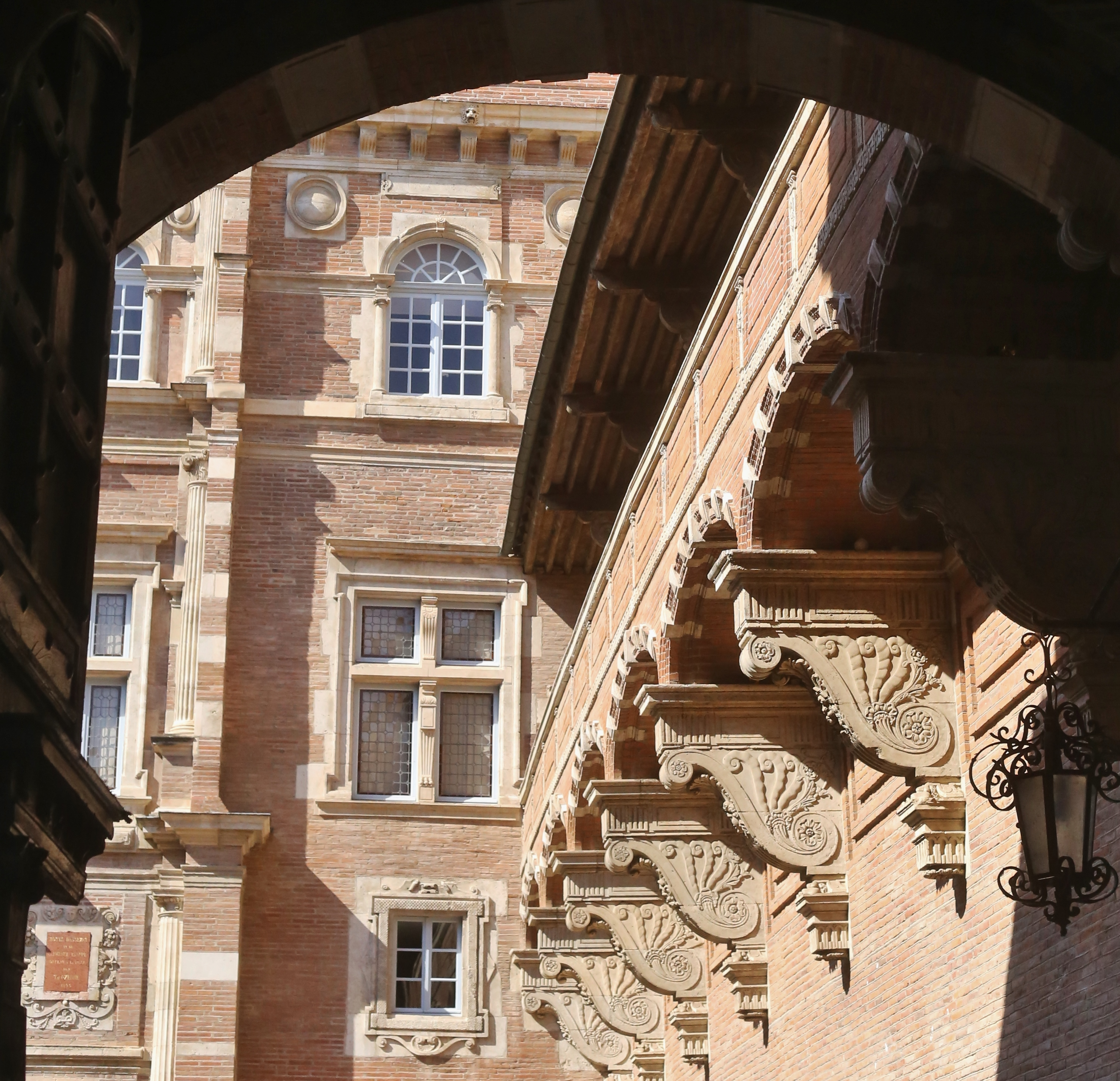
Hôtel d'Assézat

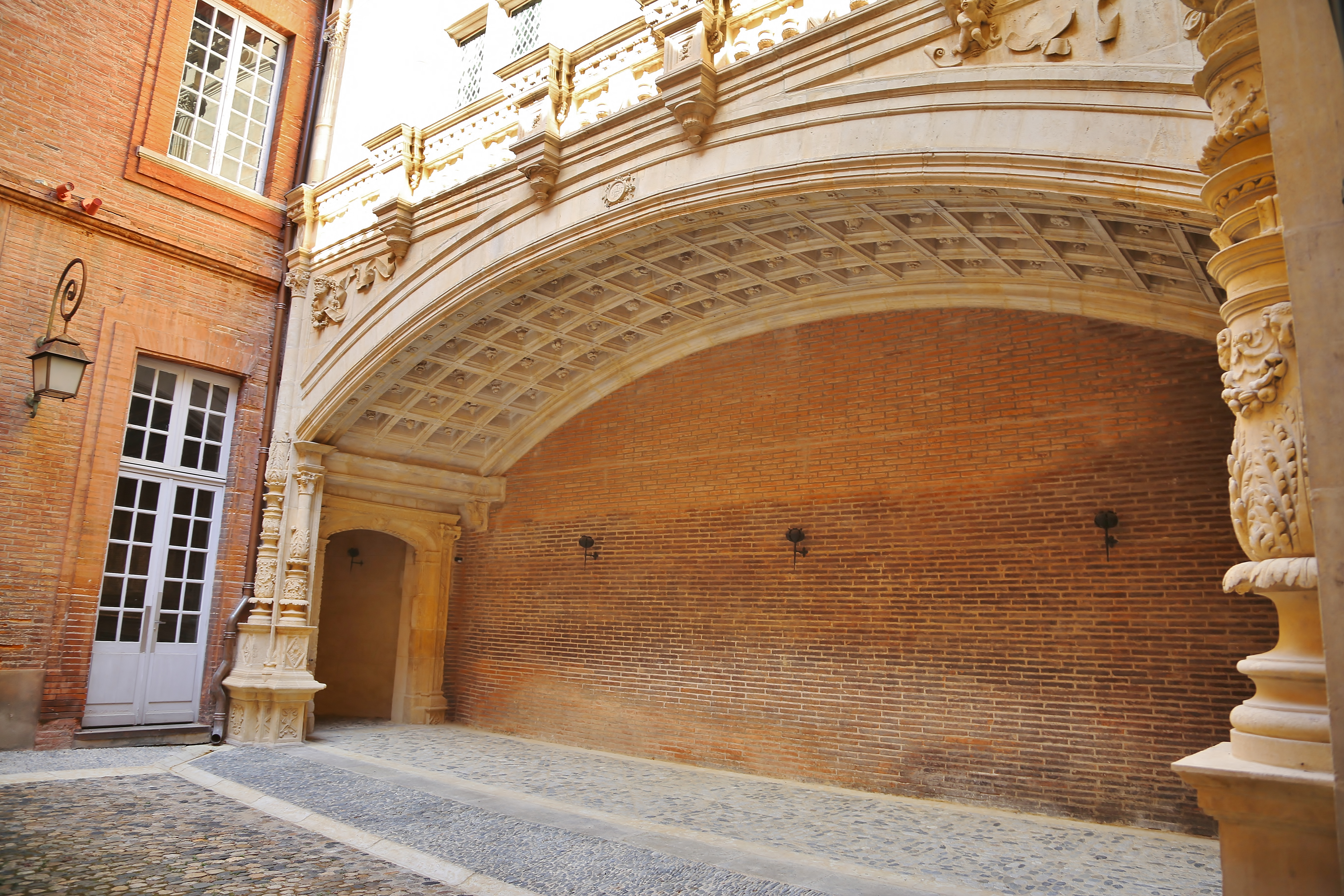
Low vault of hôtel de Bernuy

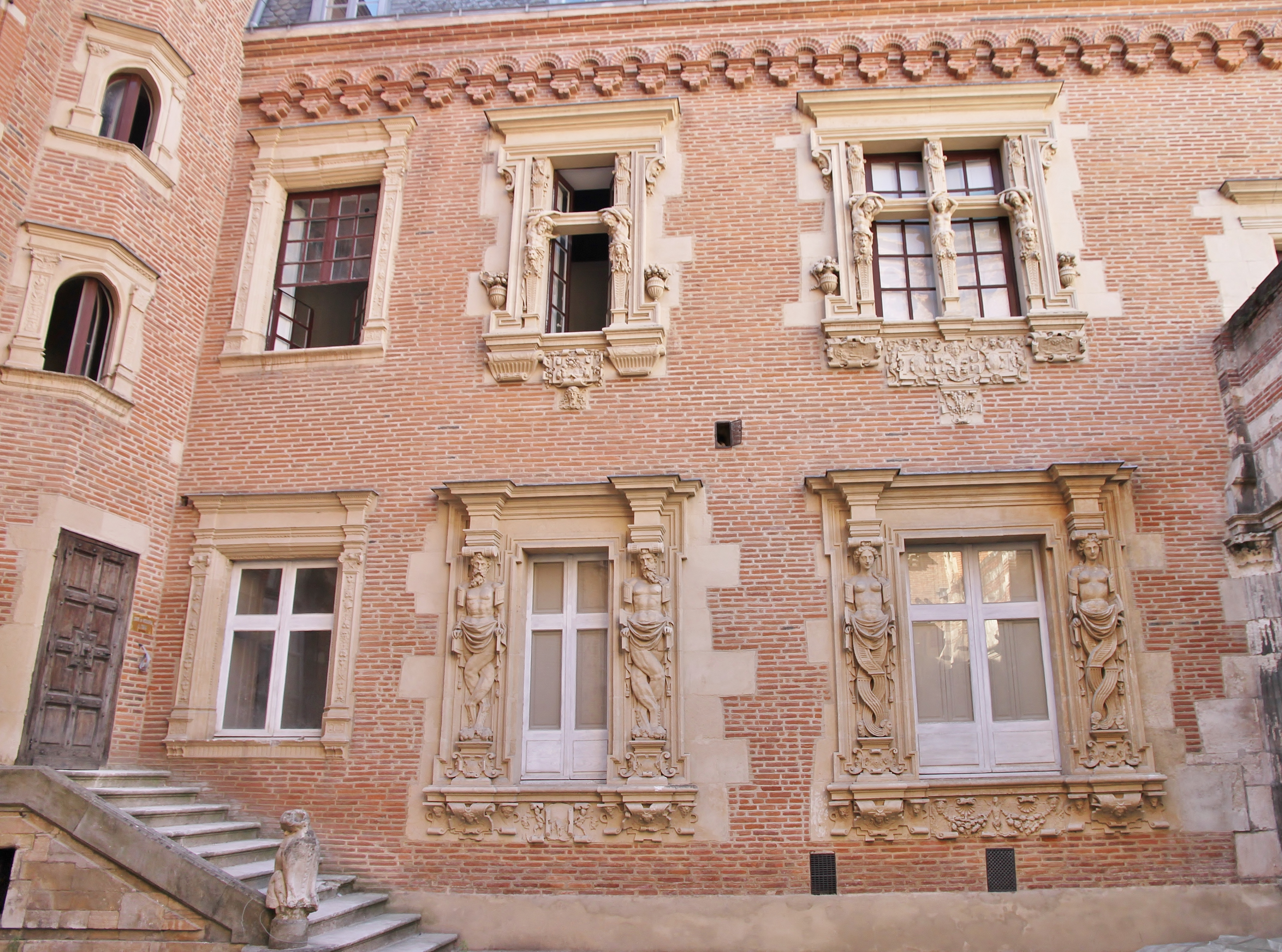
Renaissance windows at hôtel du Vieux-Raisin

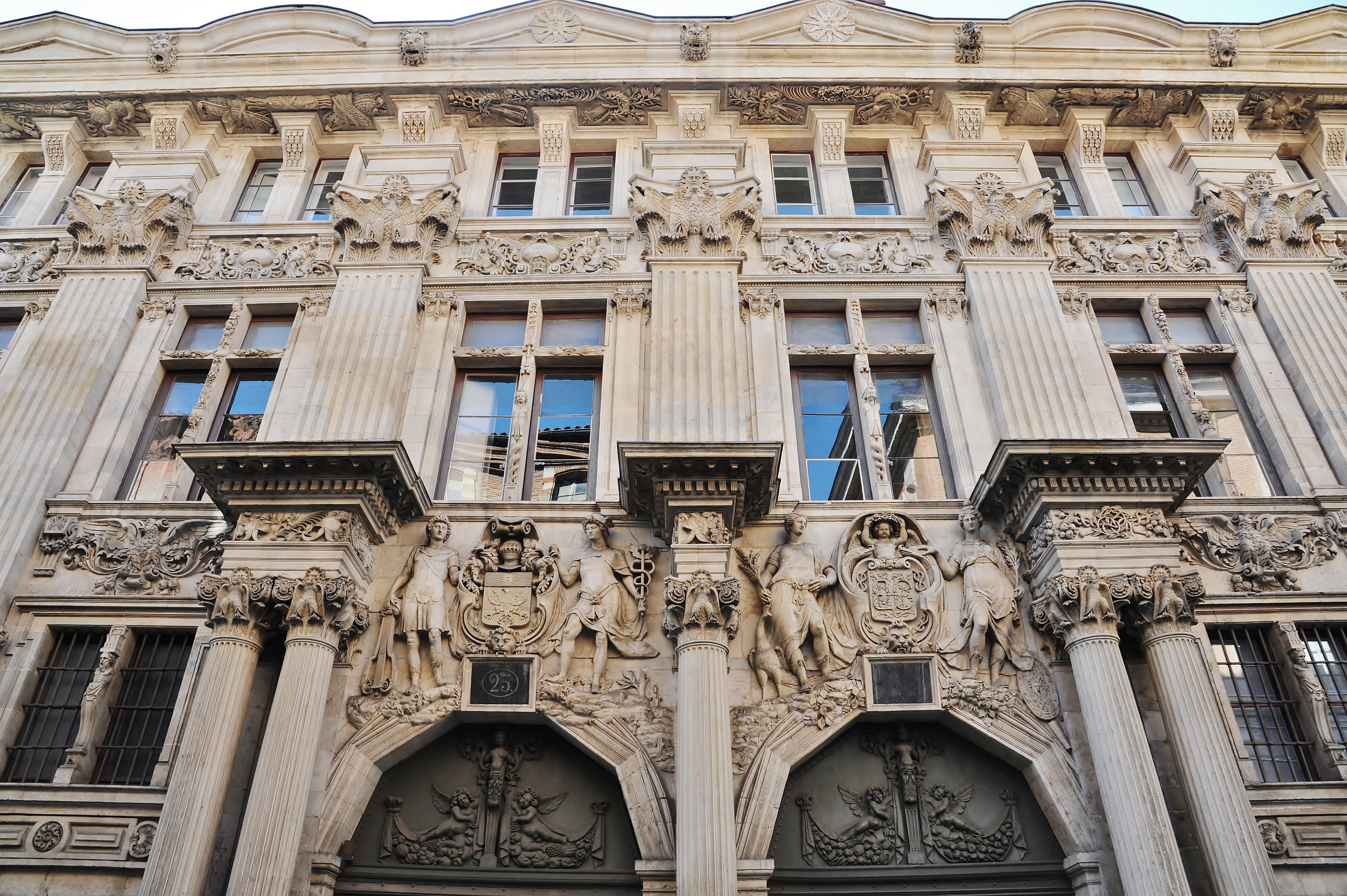
The hôtel de Clary and its Mannerist decoration
Sample of Renaissance doors

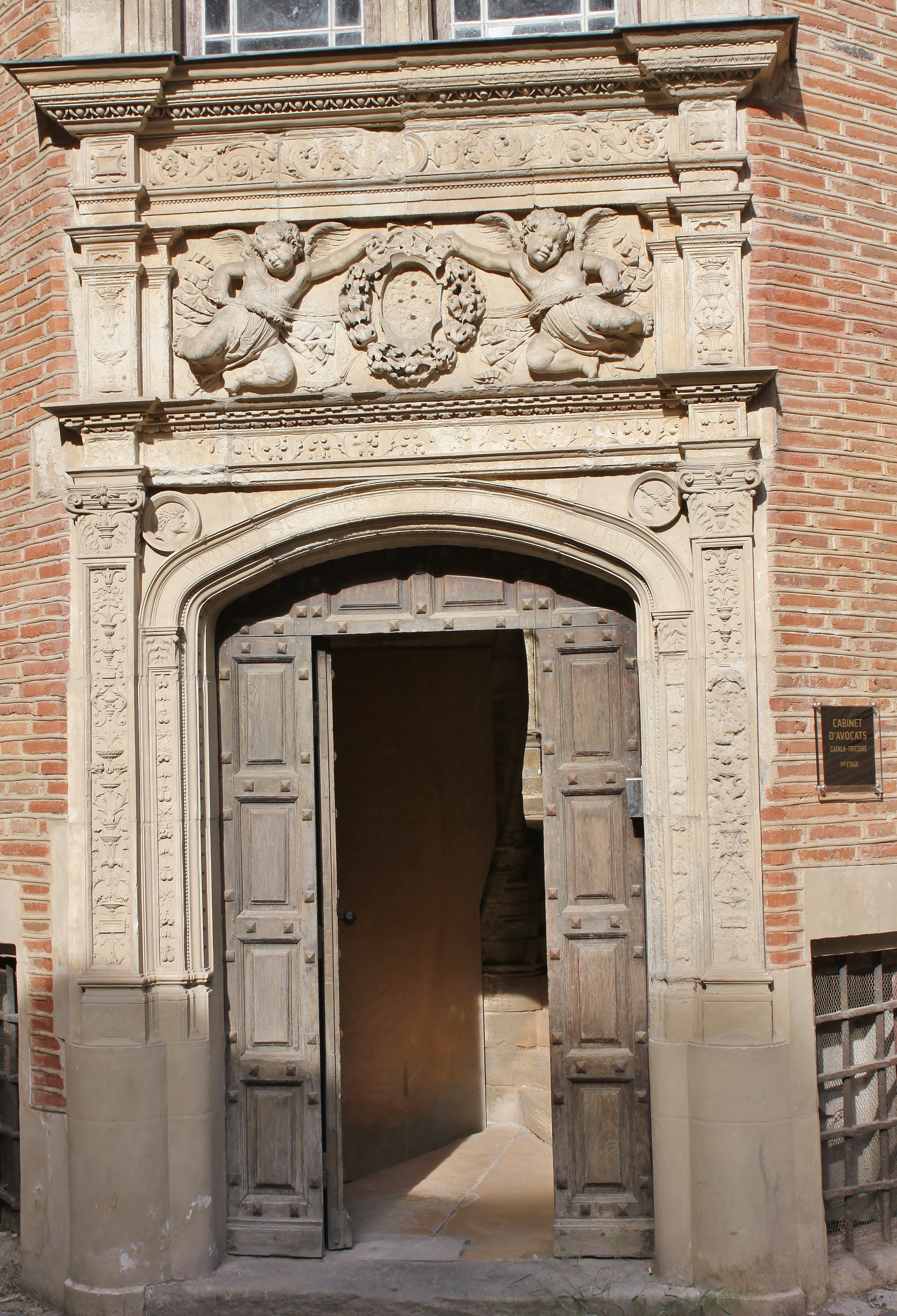
Door of hôtel du Vieux-Raisin

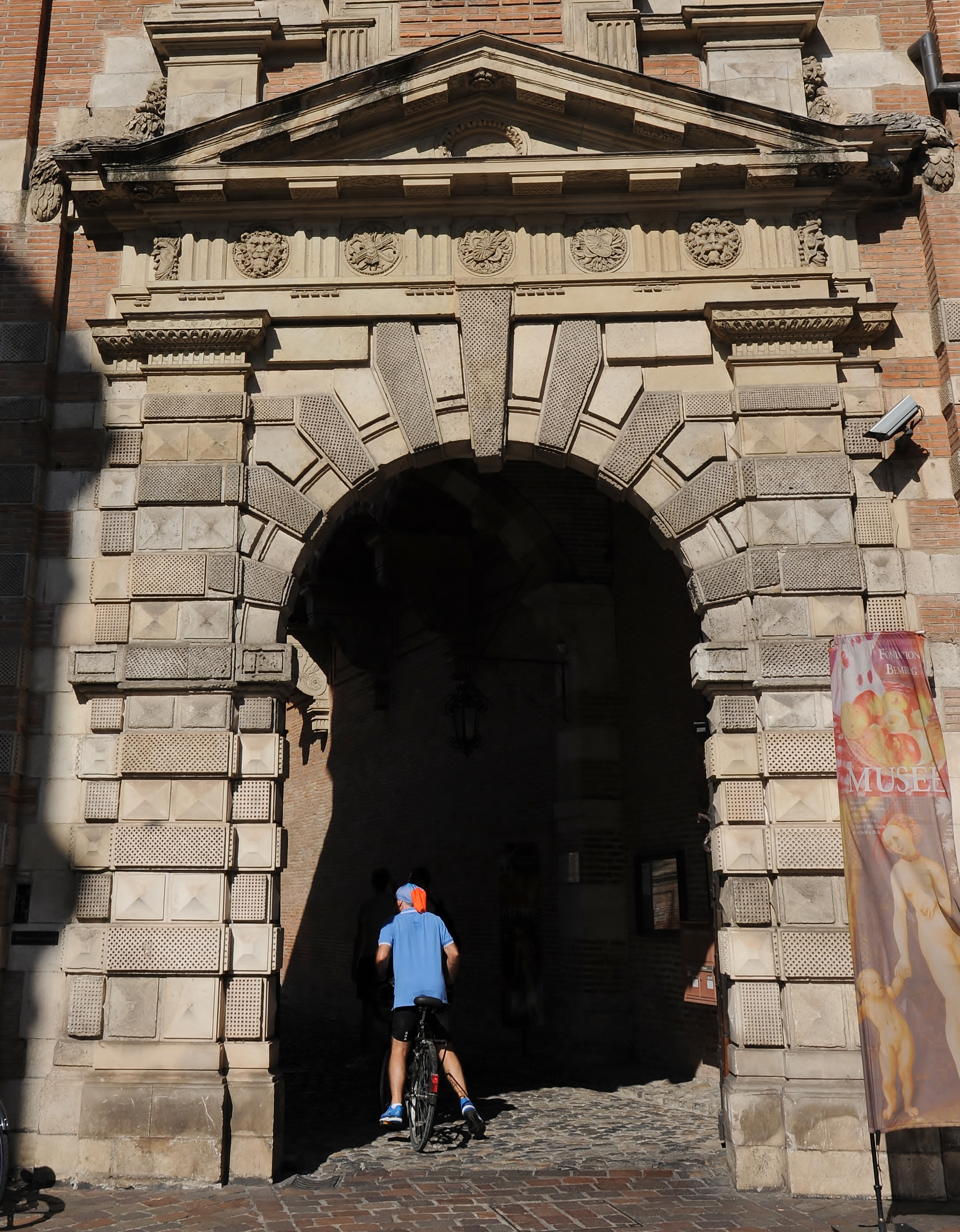
Portal of hôtel d'Assézat

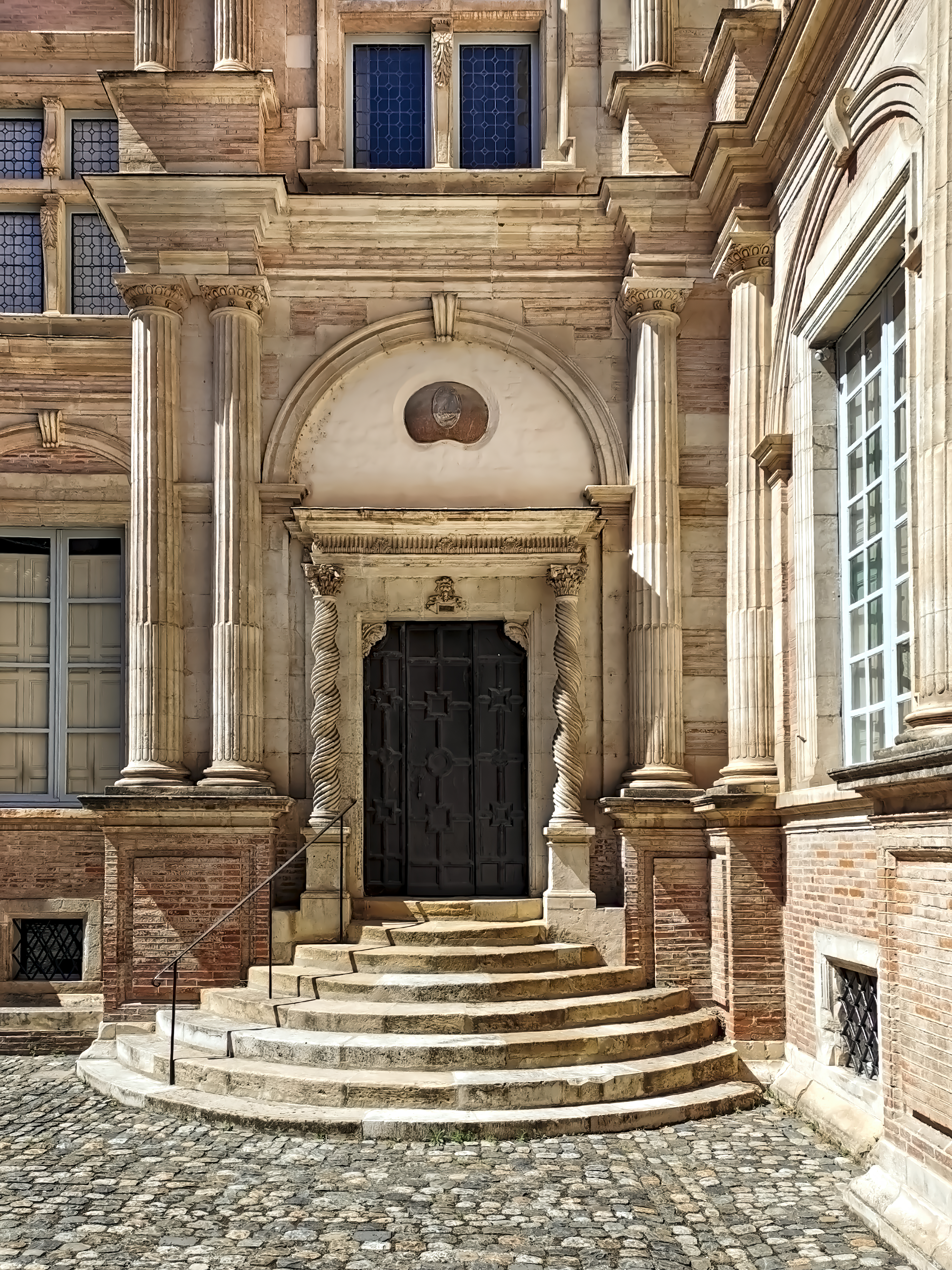
Door of hôtel d'Assézat

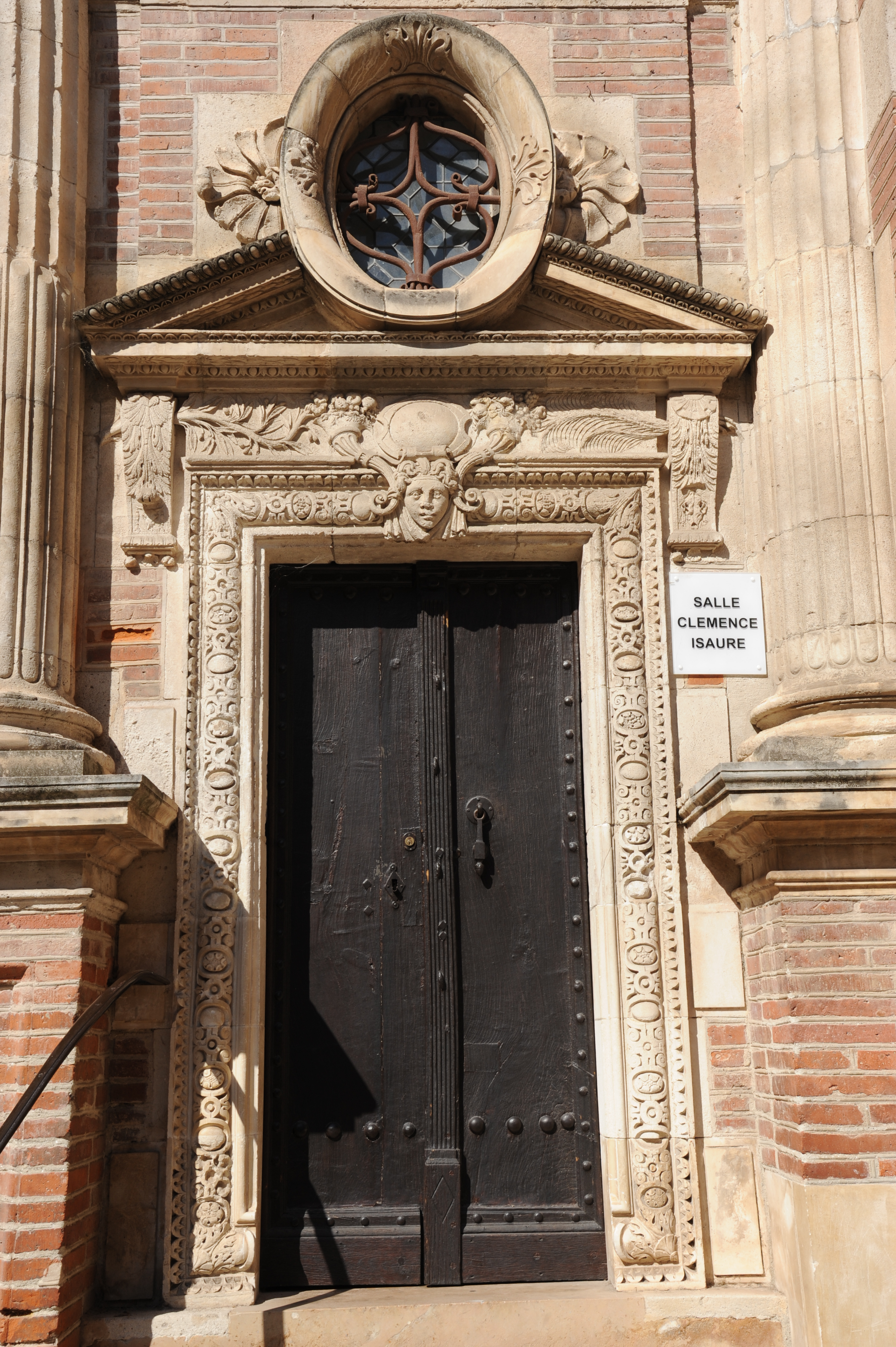
Door of hôtel d'Assézat

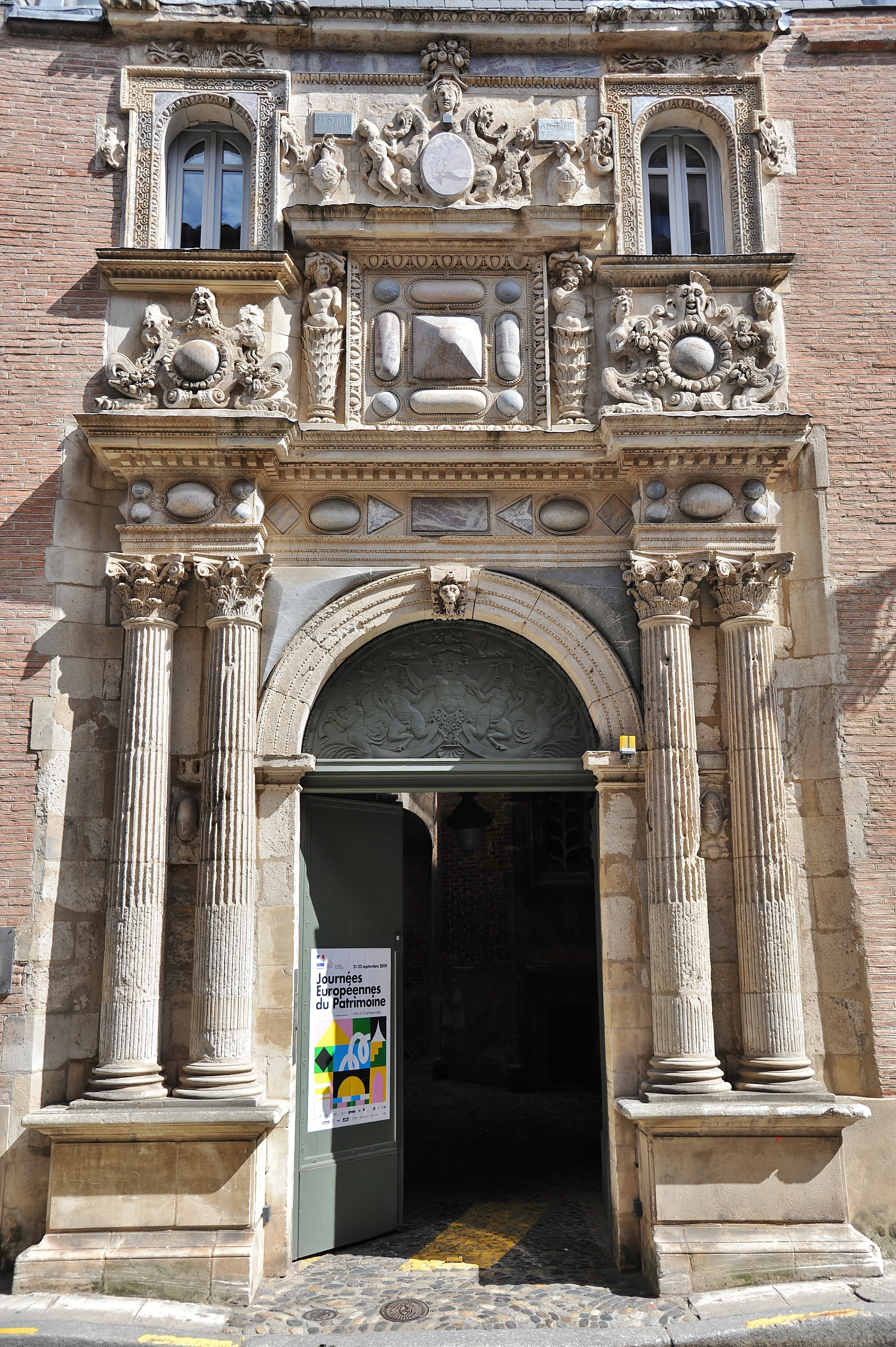
Portal of hôtel Molinier

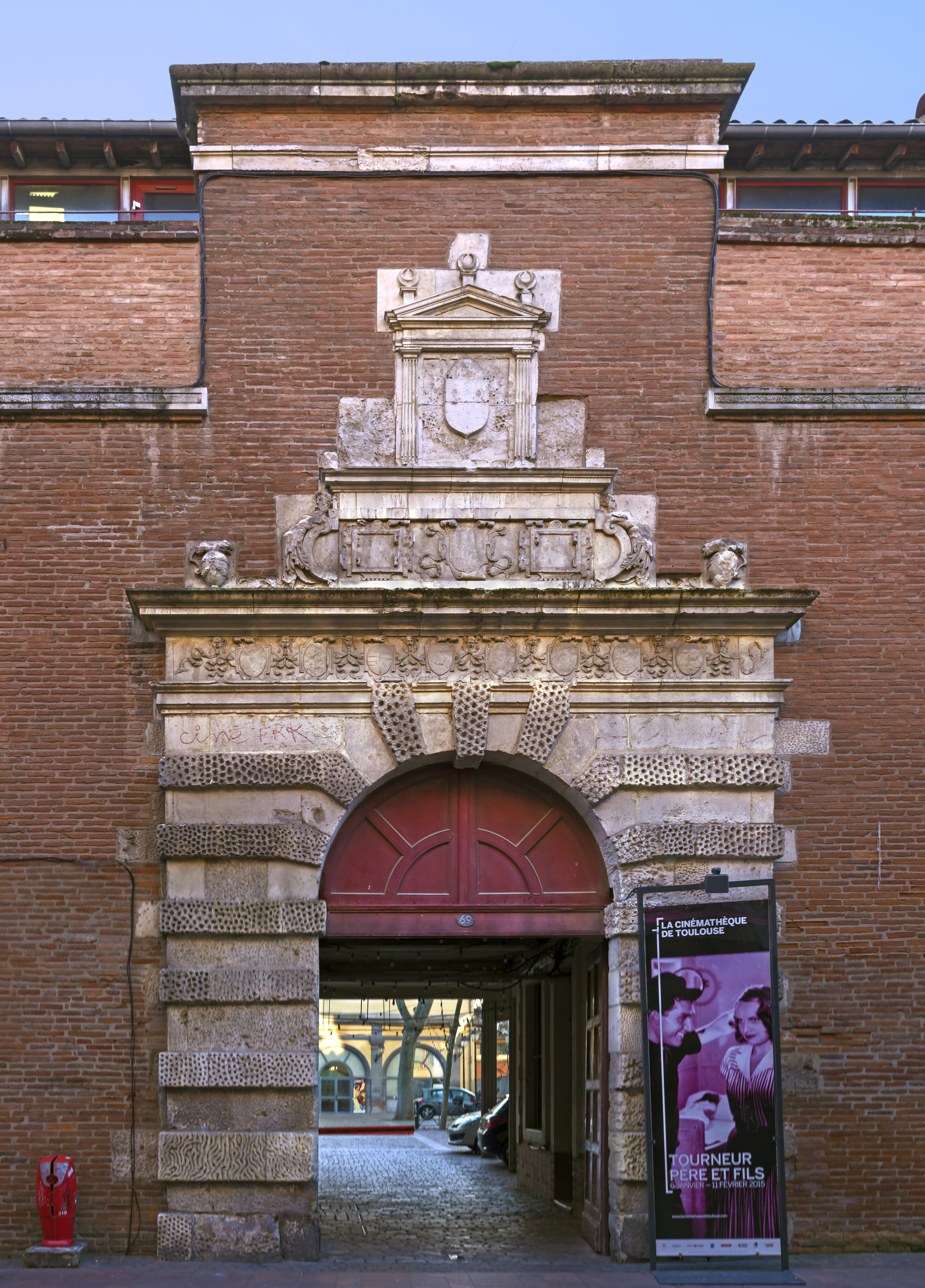
Portal of a former college of the university

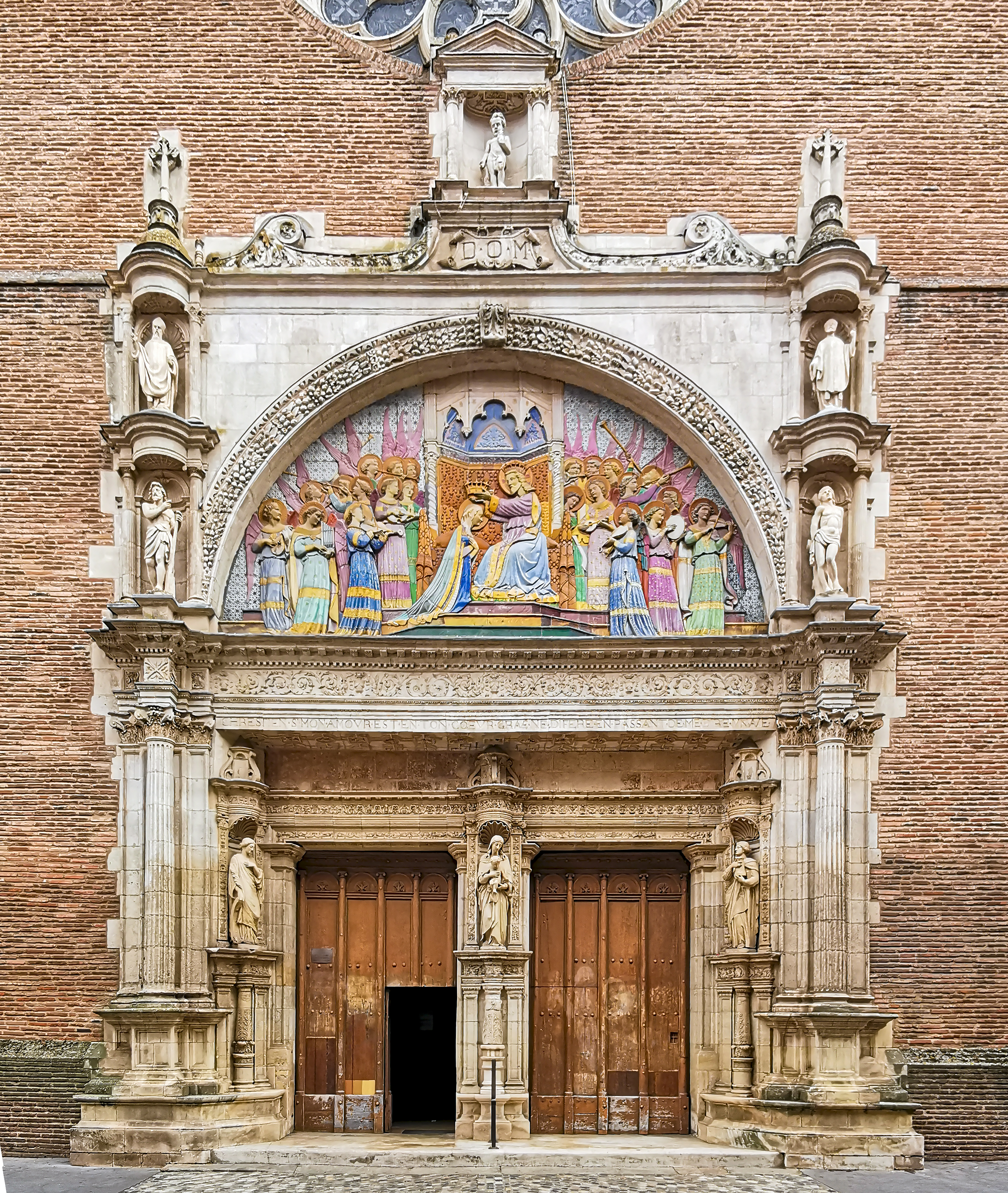
Portal of Dalbade church

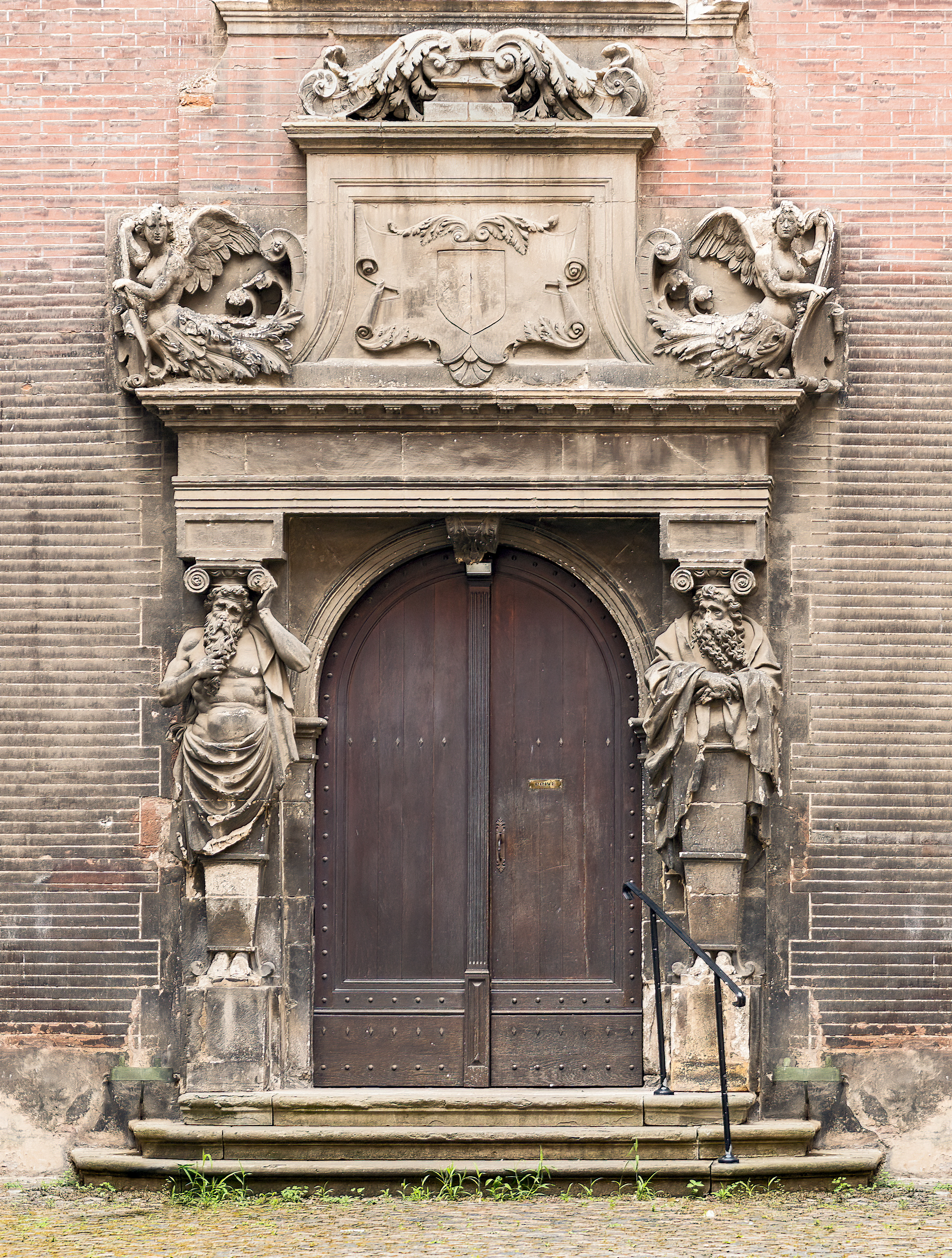
Door of hôtel de Bagis

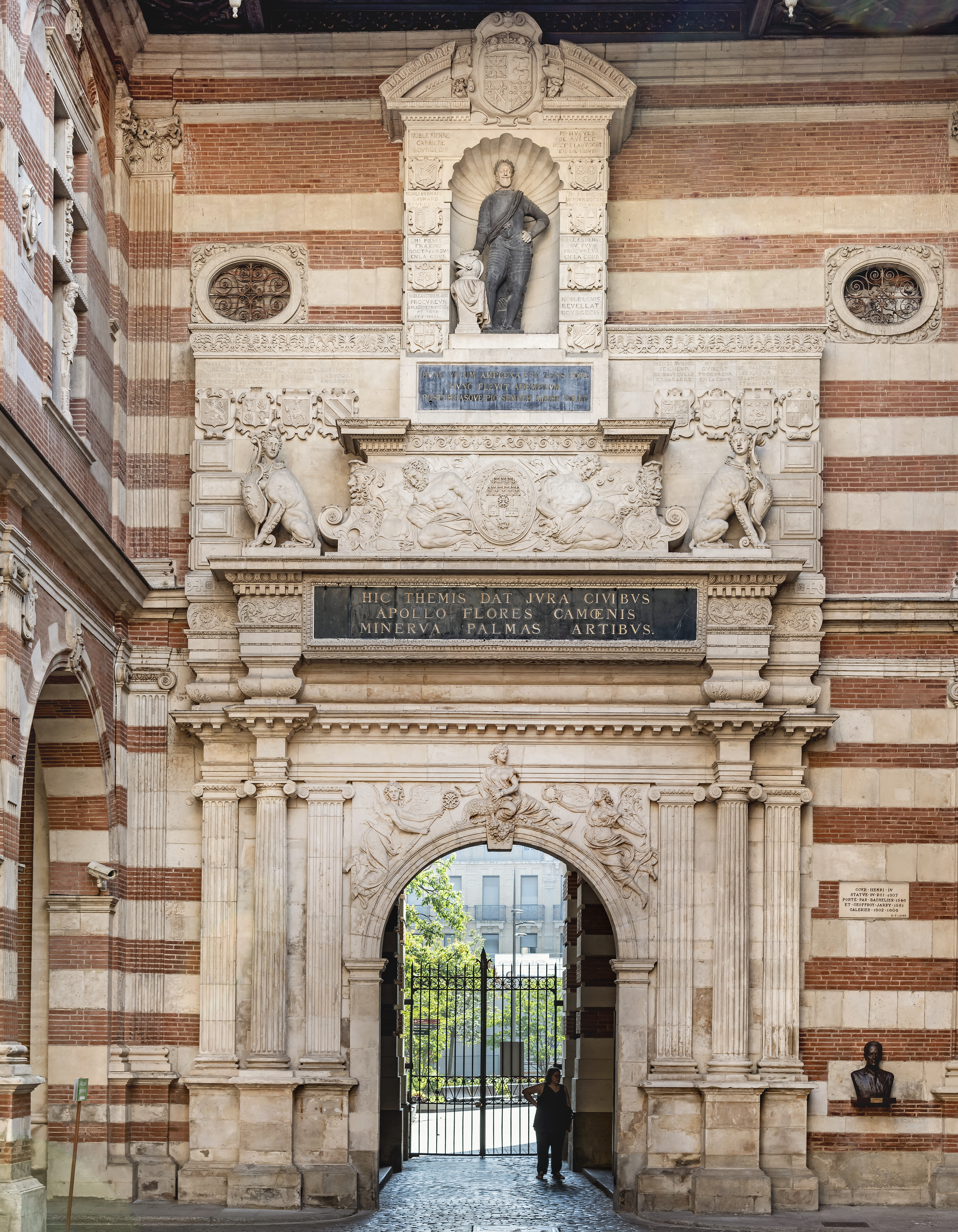
Triumphal portal of the Capitole

=== 17th century architecture ===
==== 17th century religious architecture ====
The French Wars of Religion, which started in the second half of the 16th century, brought to the city many religious orders who came to seek asylum in this solid Catholic bastion. They had baroque churches built in the 17th century: among them, the Order of Carthusians, expelled by the Huguenots from the region of Castres, founded the church of Saint-Pierre des Chartreux, the order of the Discalced Carmelites built the church of Saint-Exupère, the blue penitents founded the church of Saint-Jérôme and the order of Carmelite nuns created a convent of which a remarkable painted chapel remains.

17th c. religious architecture

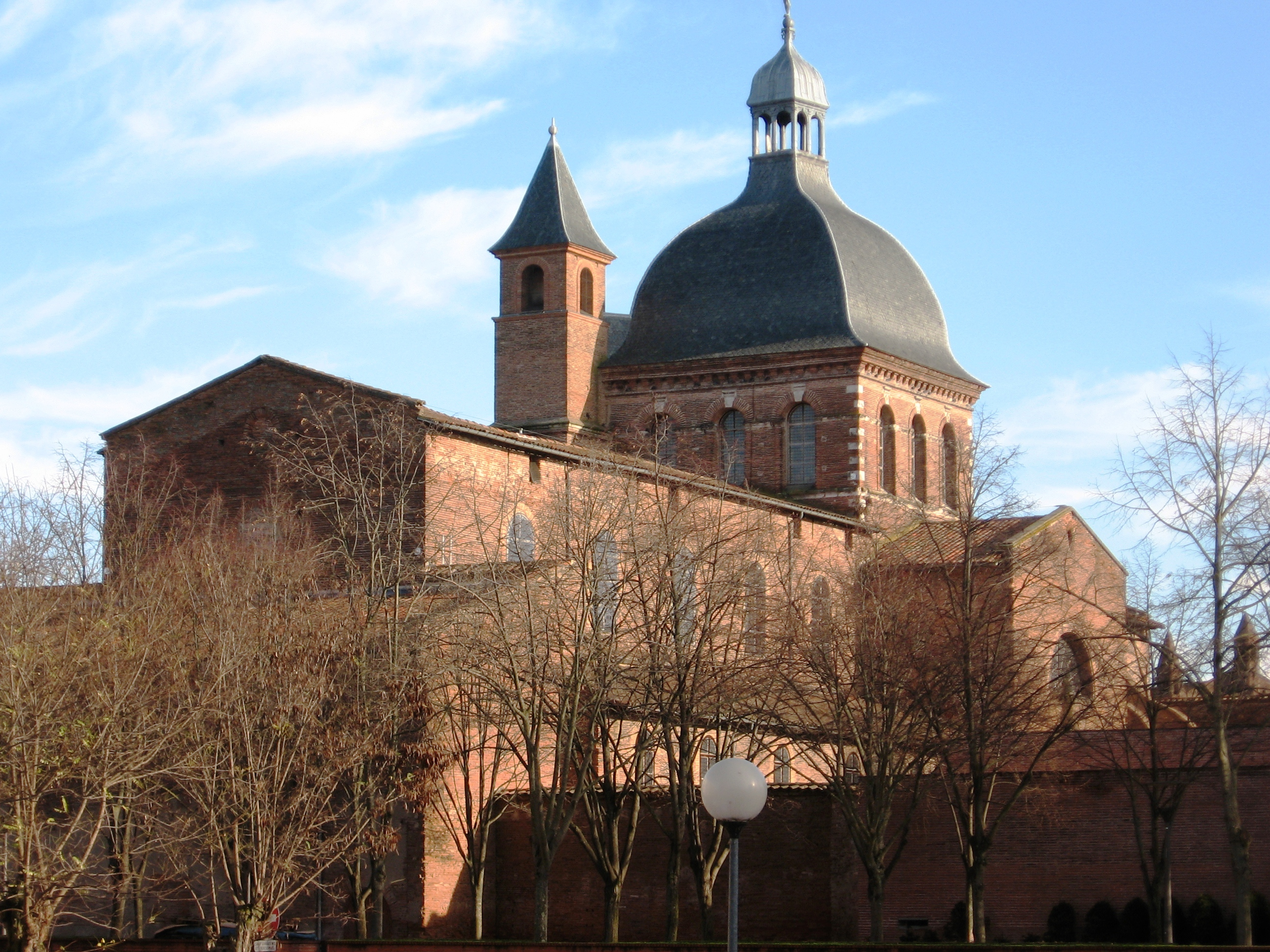
Church of Saint-Pierre des Chartreux

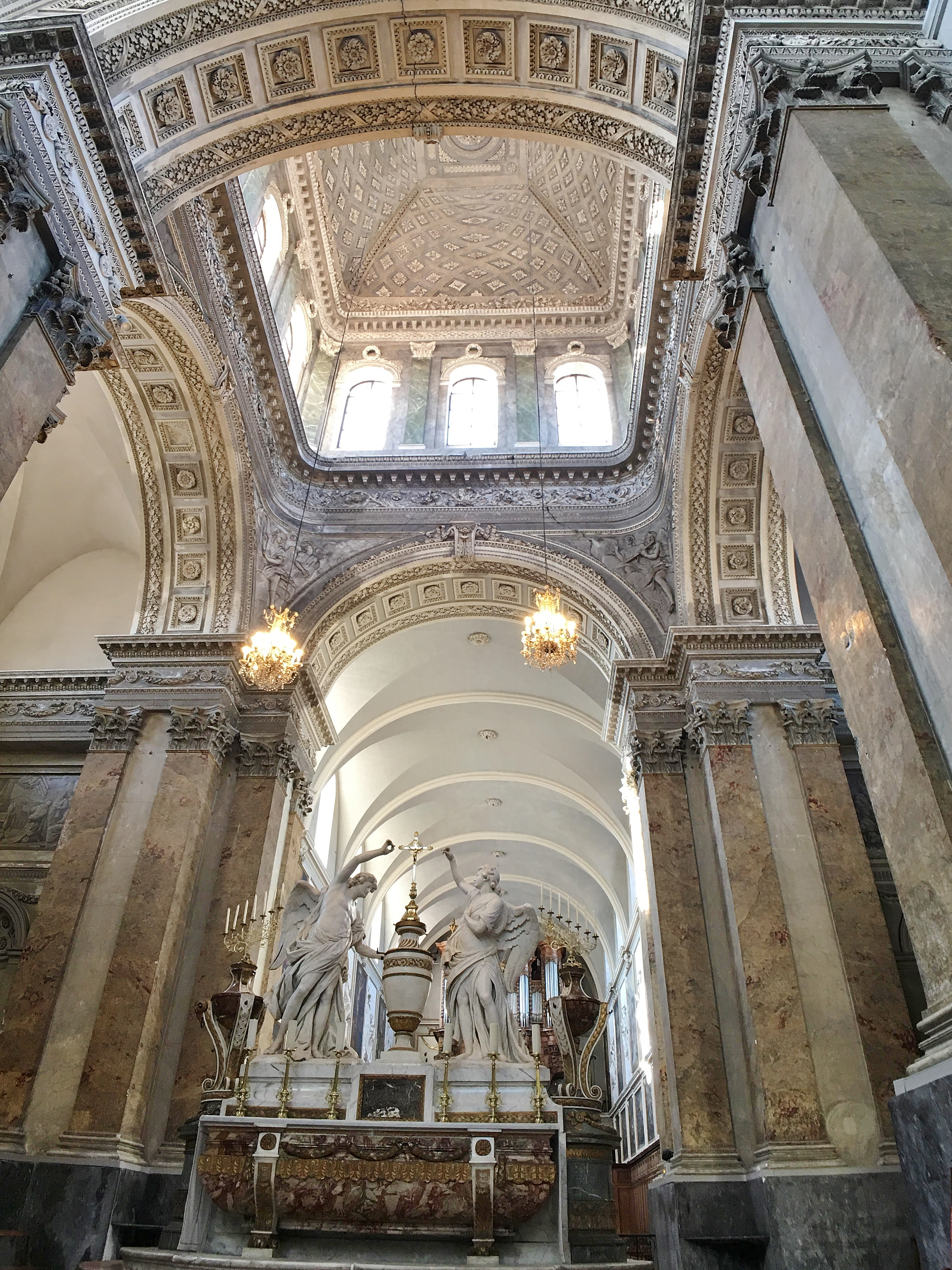
Church of Saint-Pierre des Chartreux

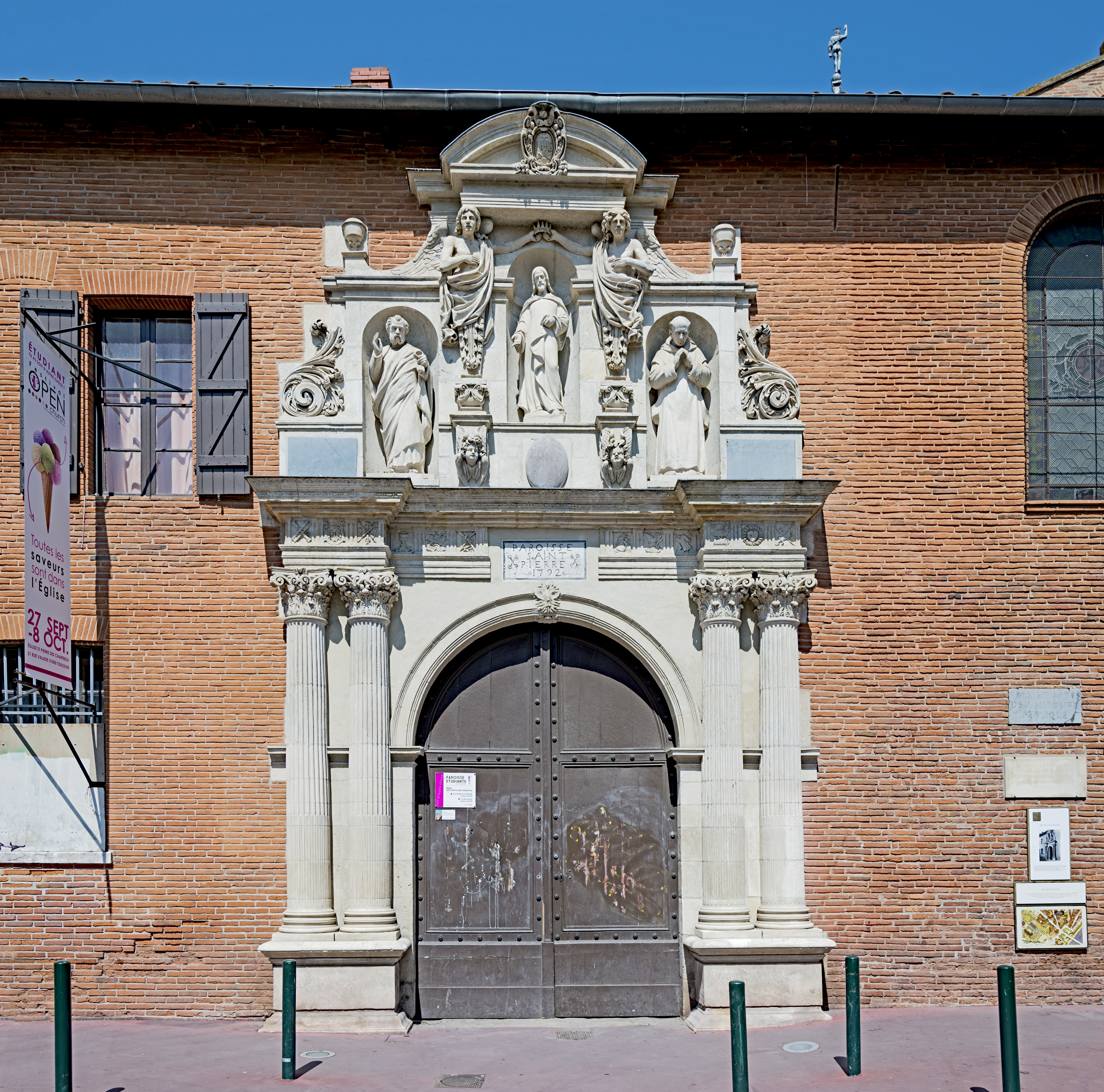
Portal of Saint-Pierre des Chartreux

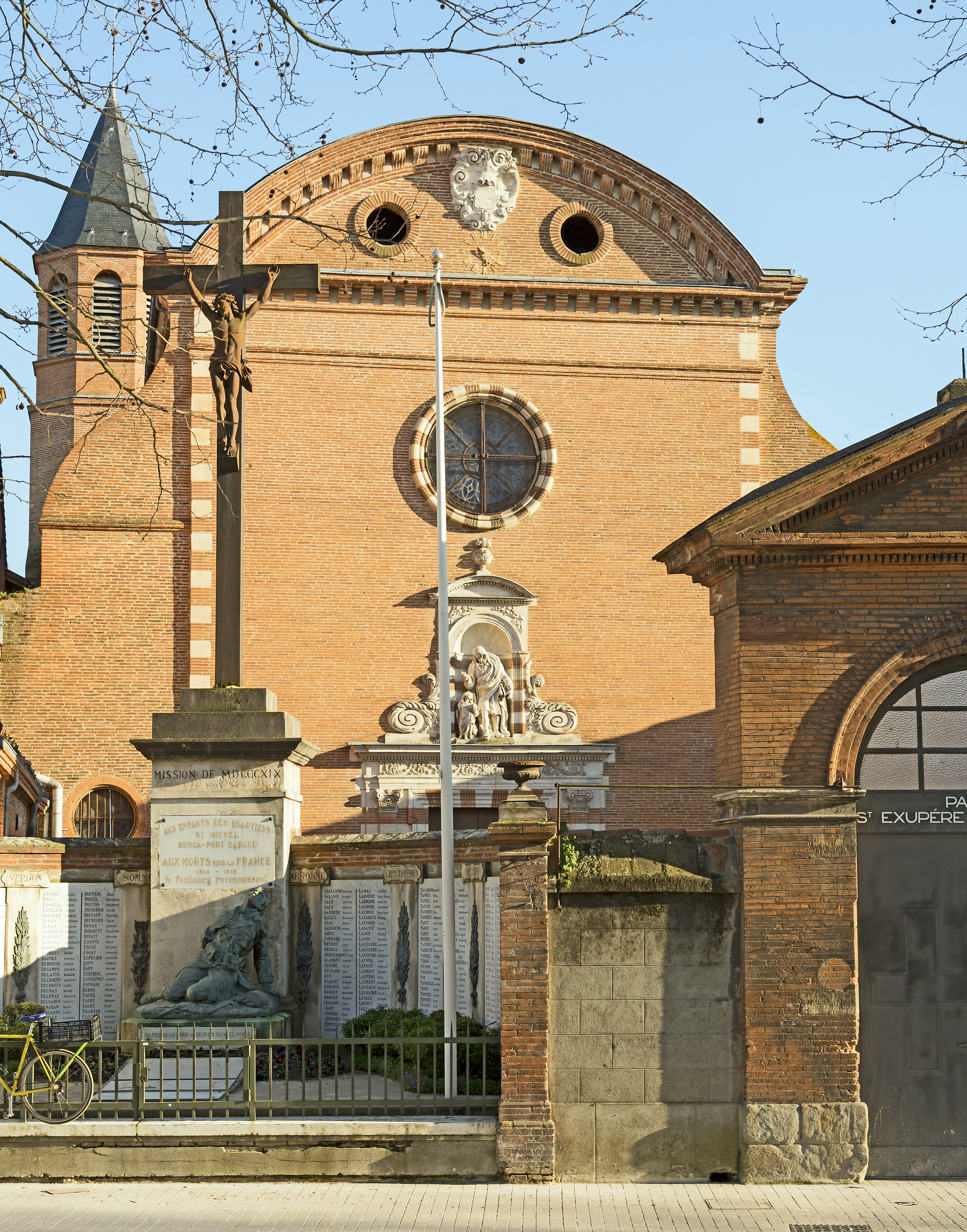
Church of Saint-Exupère

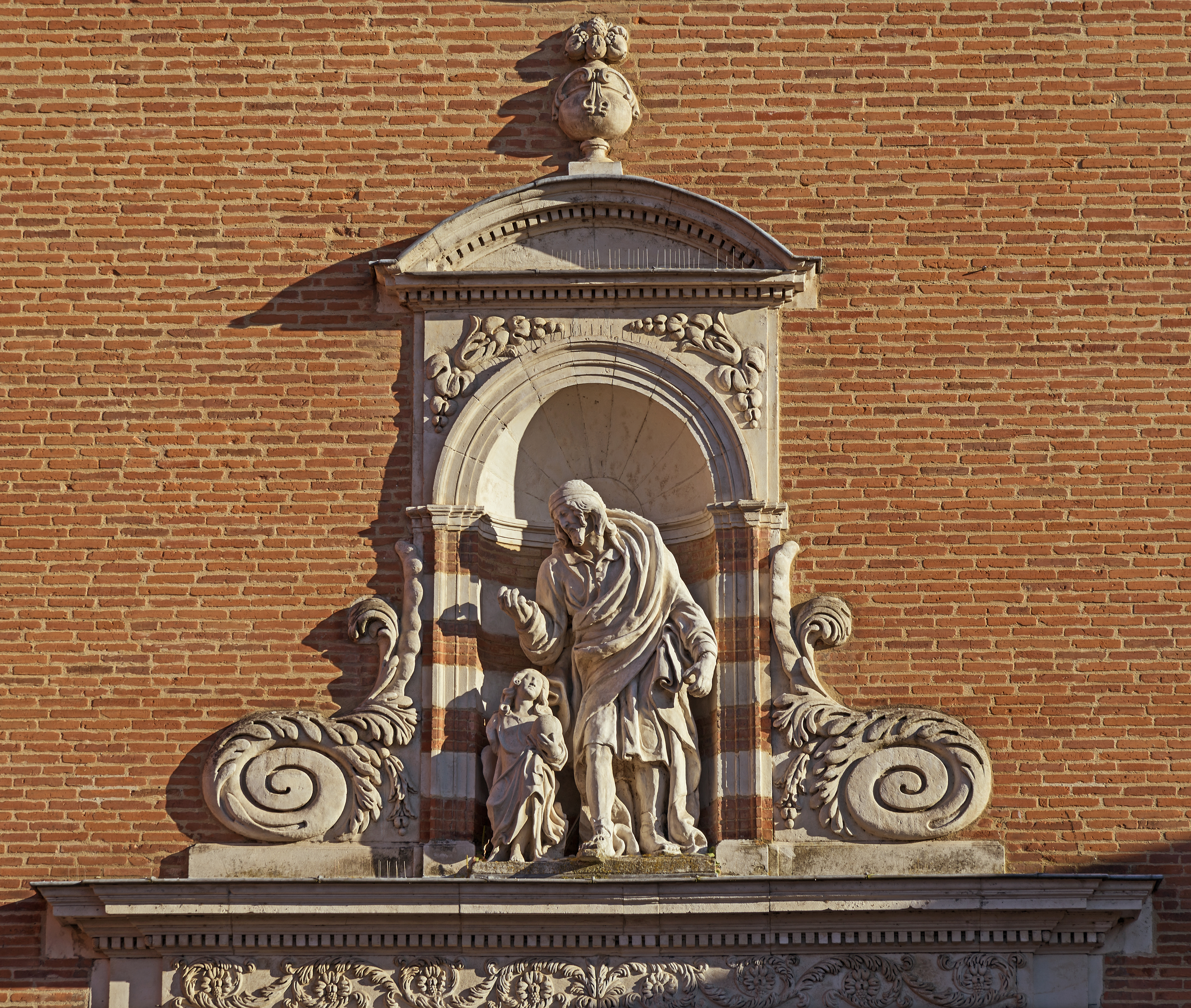
Church of Saint-Exupère (detail of the facade)

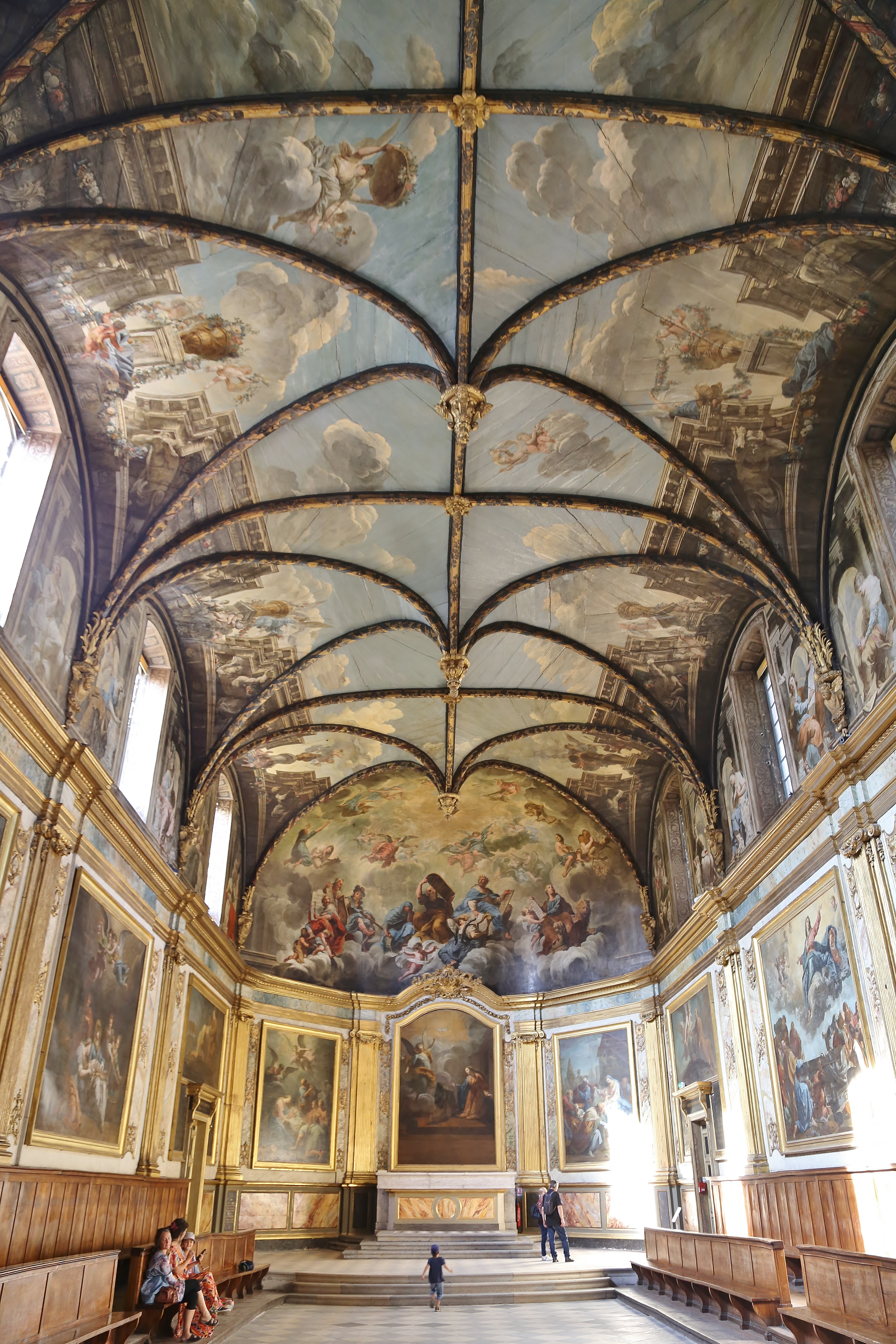
Chapel of the Carmelites, painted decoration

==== 17th century civil architecture ====
After the Renaissance, the decorations in civil architecture became less numerous and ostentatious, due to the importance given to the moderation of the architectural structures and the development of interior decorations. The play of colours (between brick and stone) and reliefs (bossing) were less costly and nevertheless effective solutions for livening up facades. The 17th century is the century that gave Toulouse the largest number of its private mansions, most of them built by members of parlement.

17th c. civil architecture

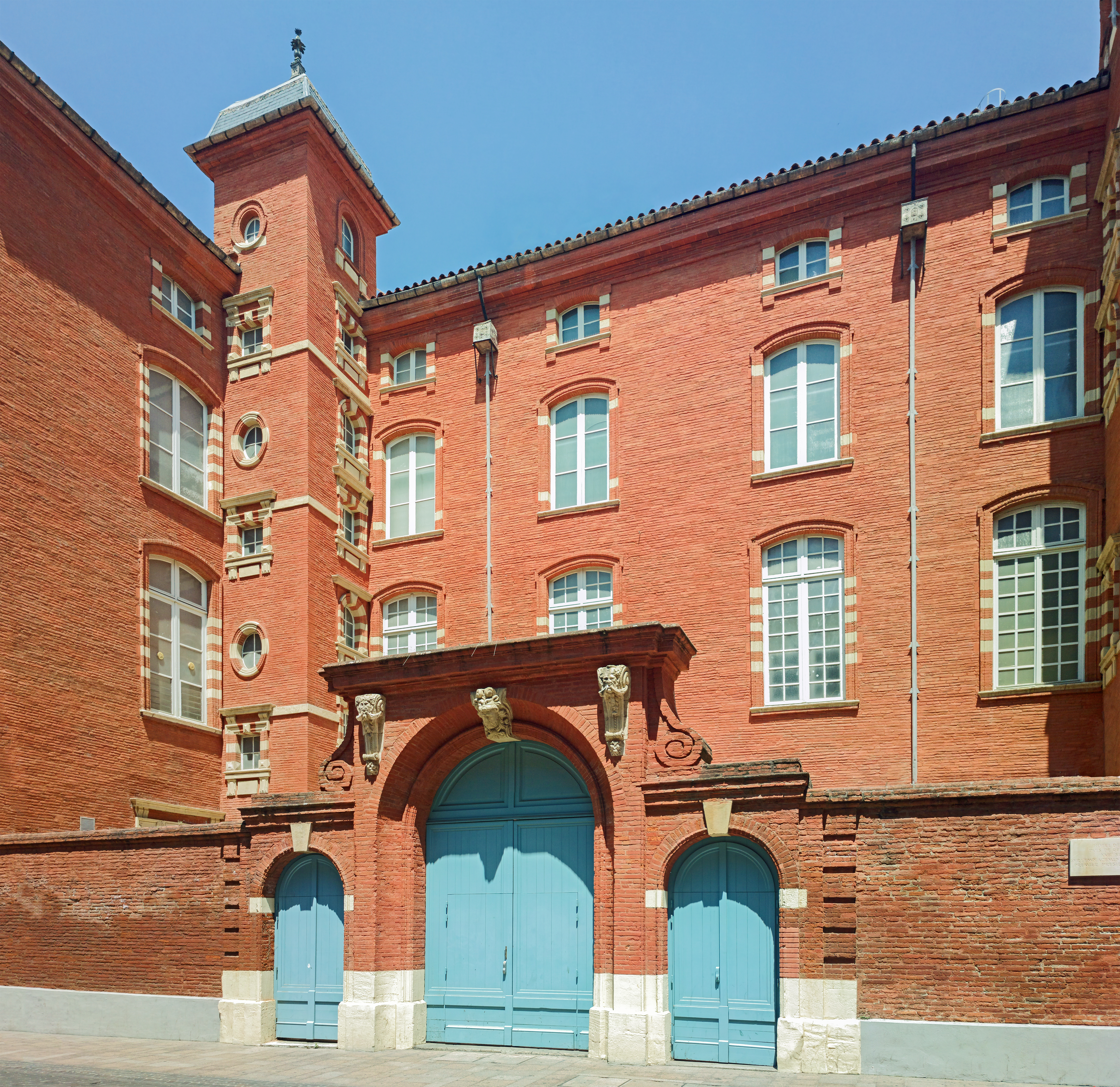
Hôtel de Caulet

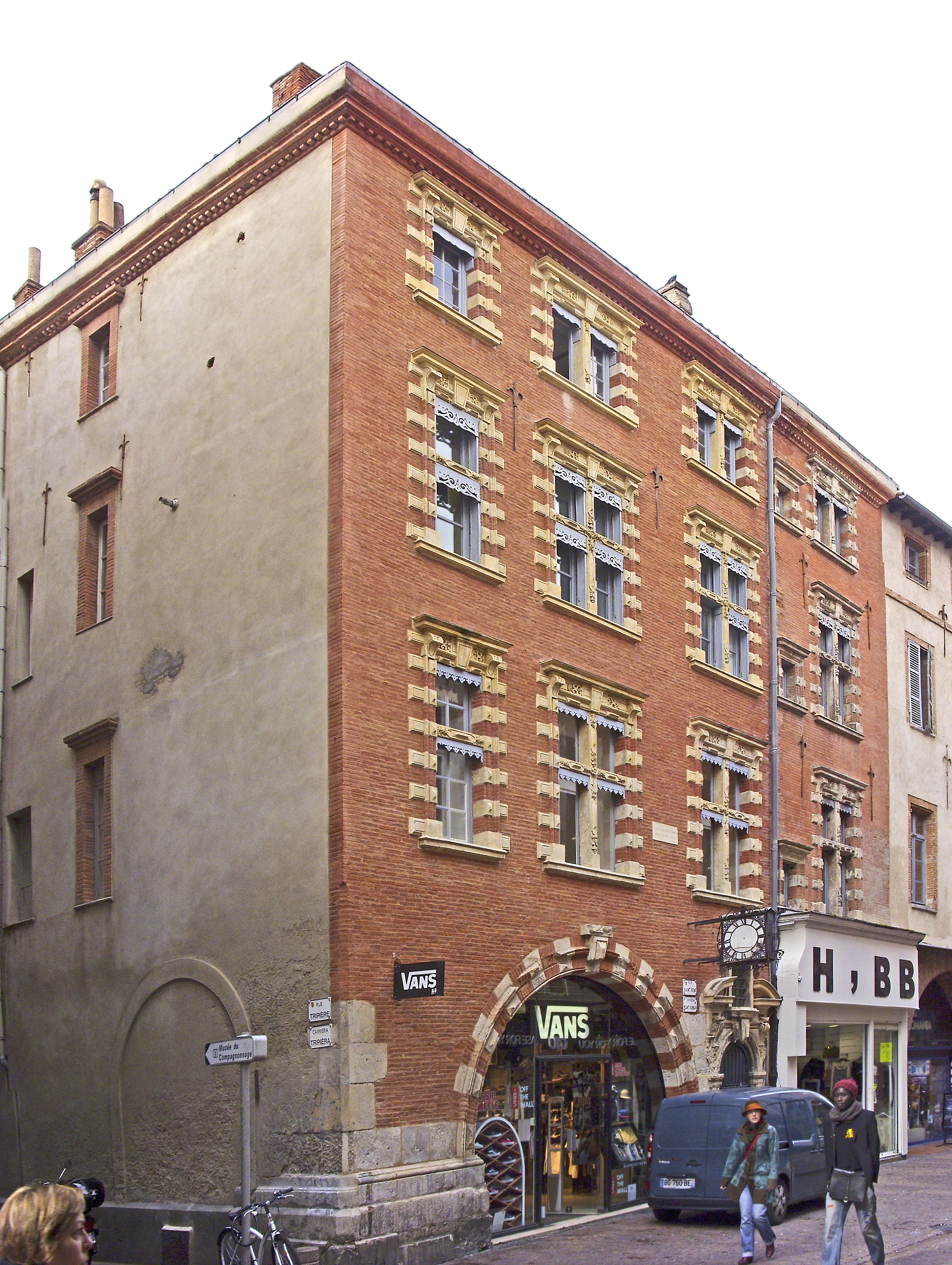
Hôtel Comère

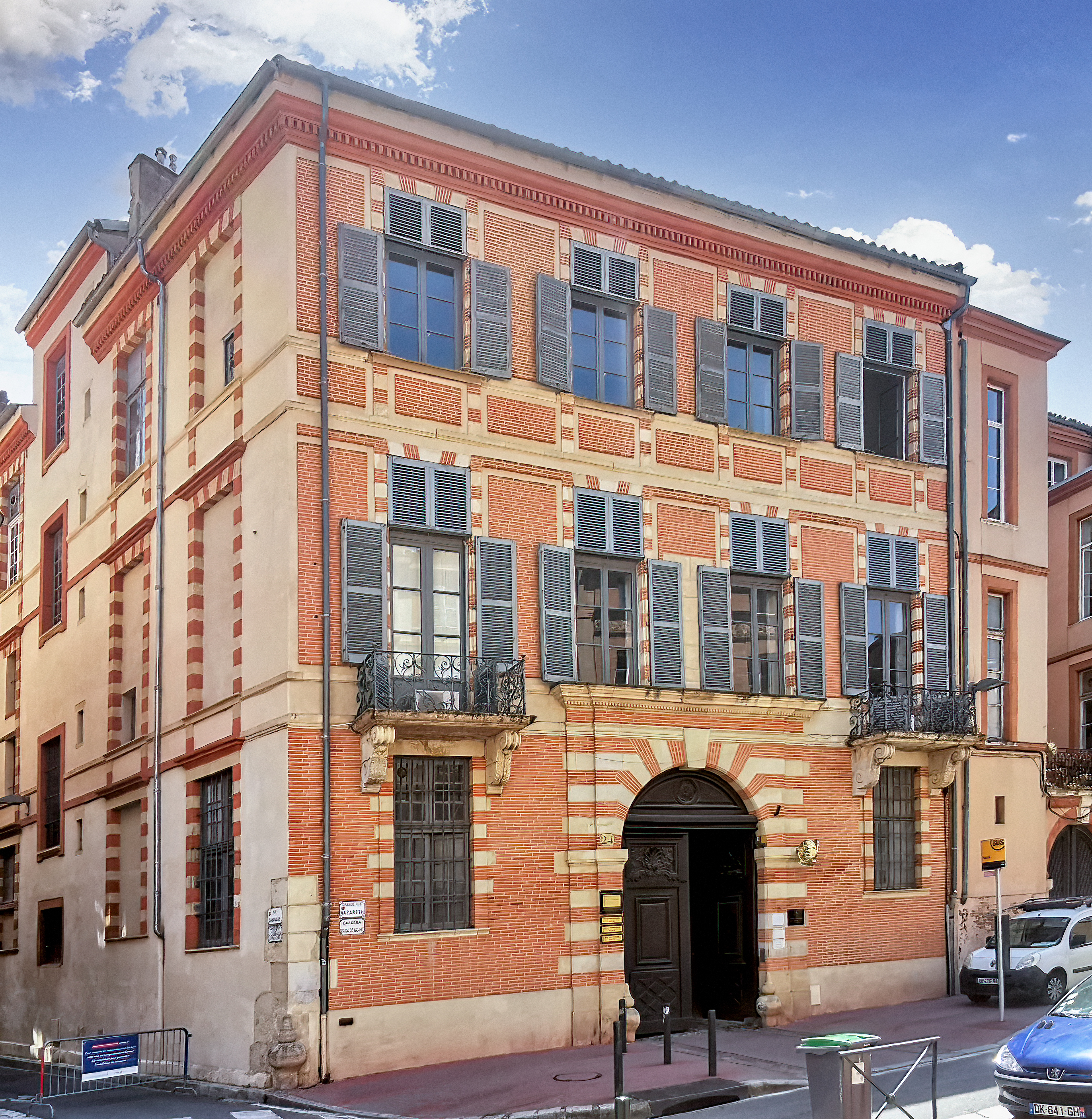
Hôtel d'Avizard

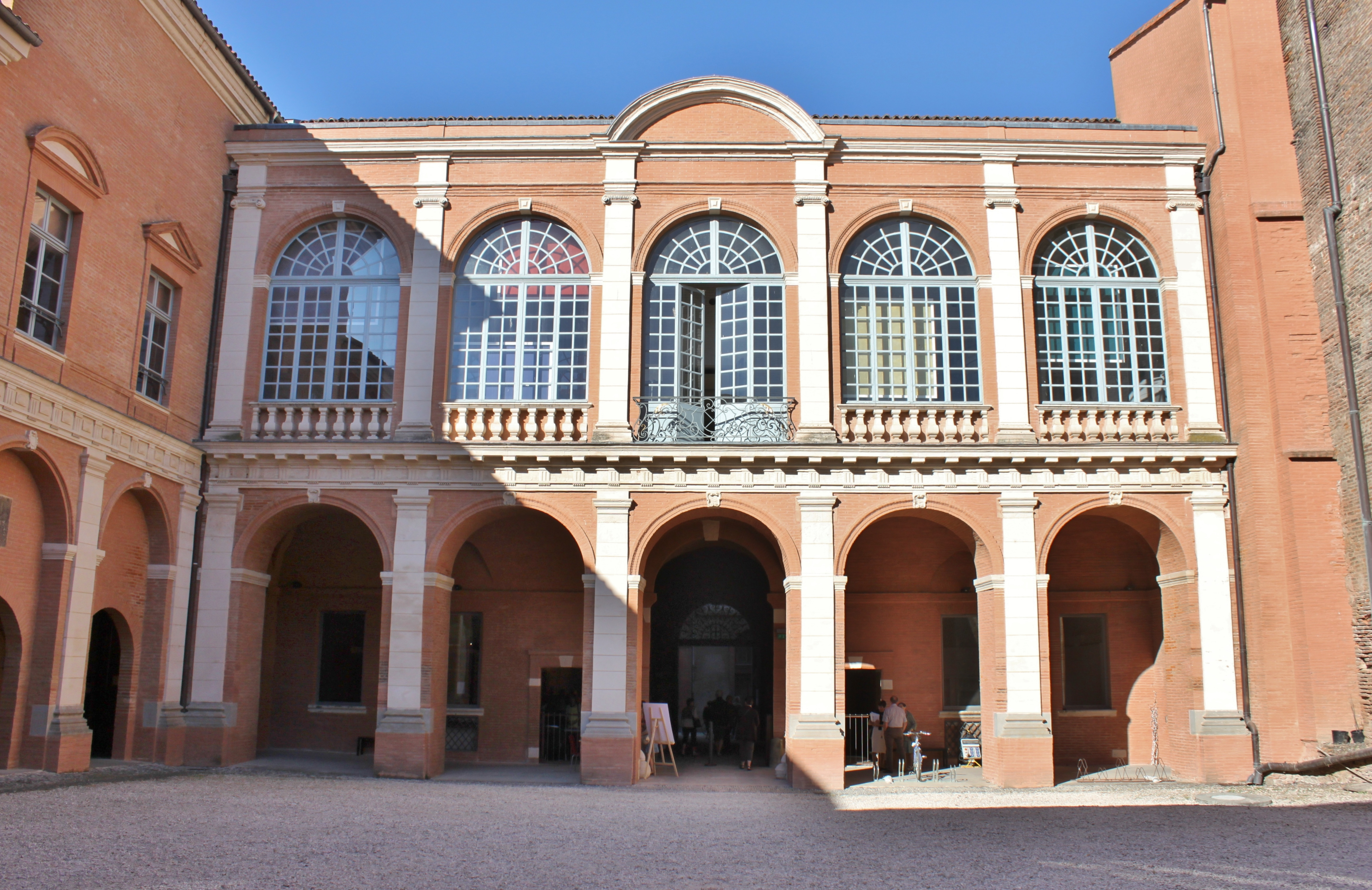
Hôtel Saint-Jean (courtyard), former Grand Priory of Knights Hospitaller

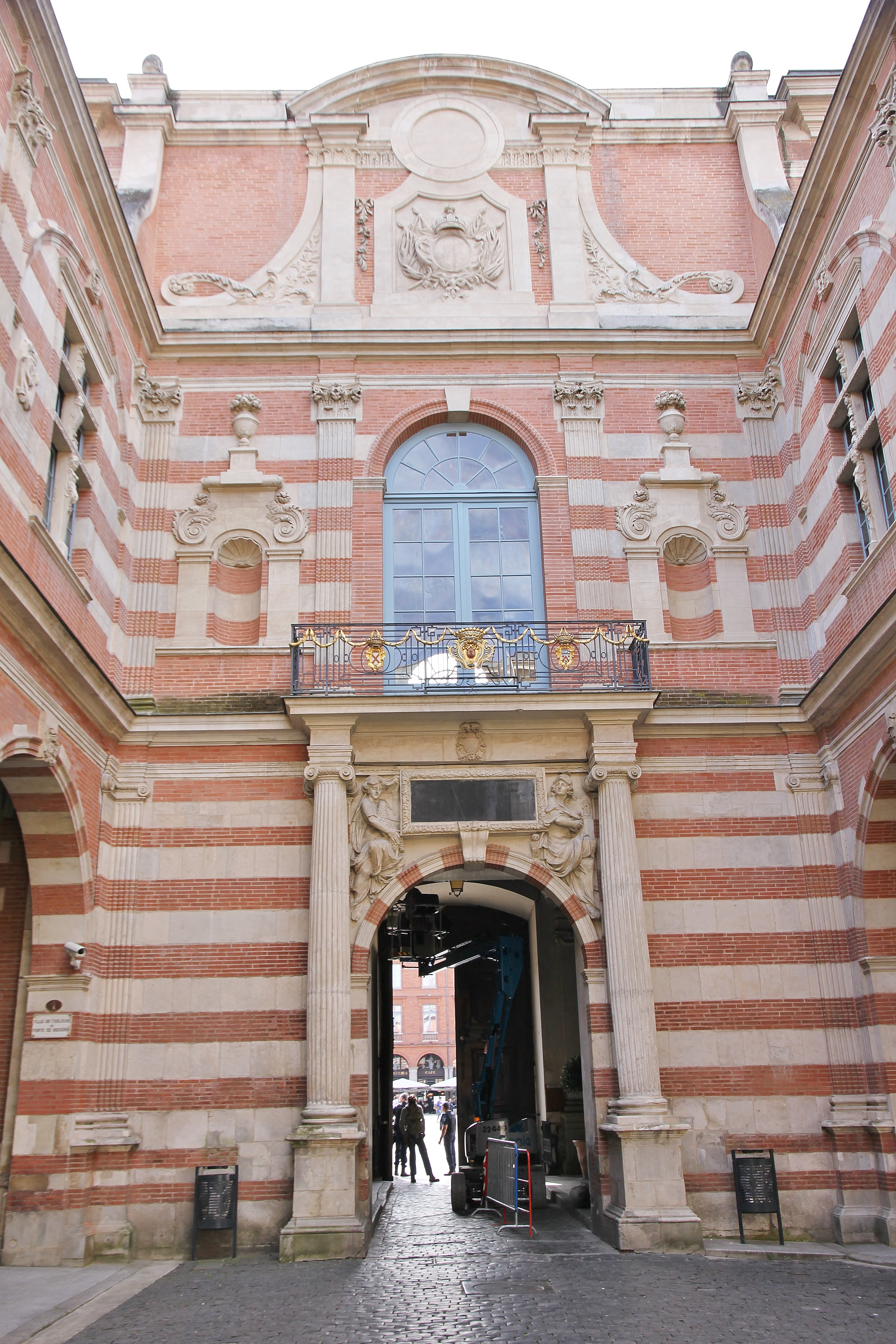
Henri IV courtyard of the Capitole: brick and stone.

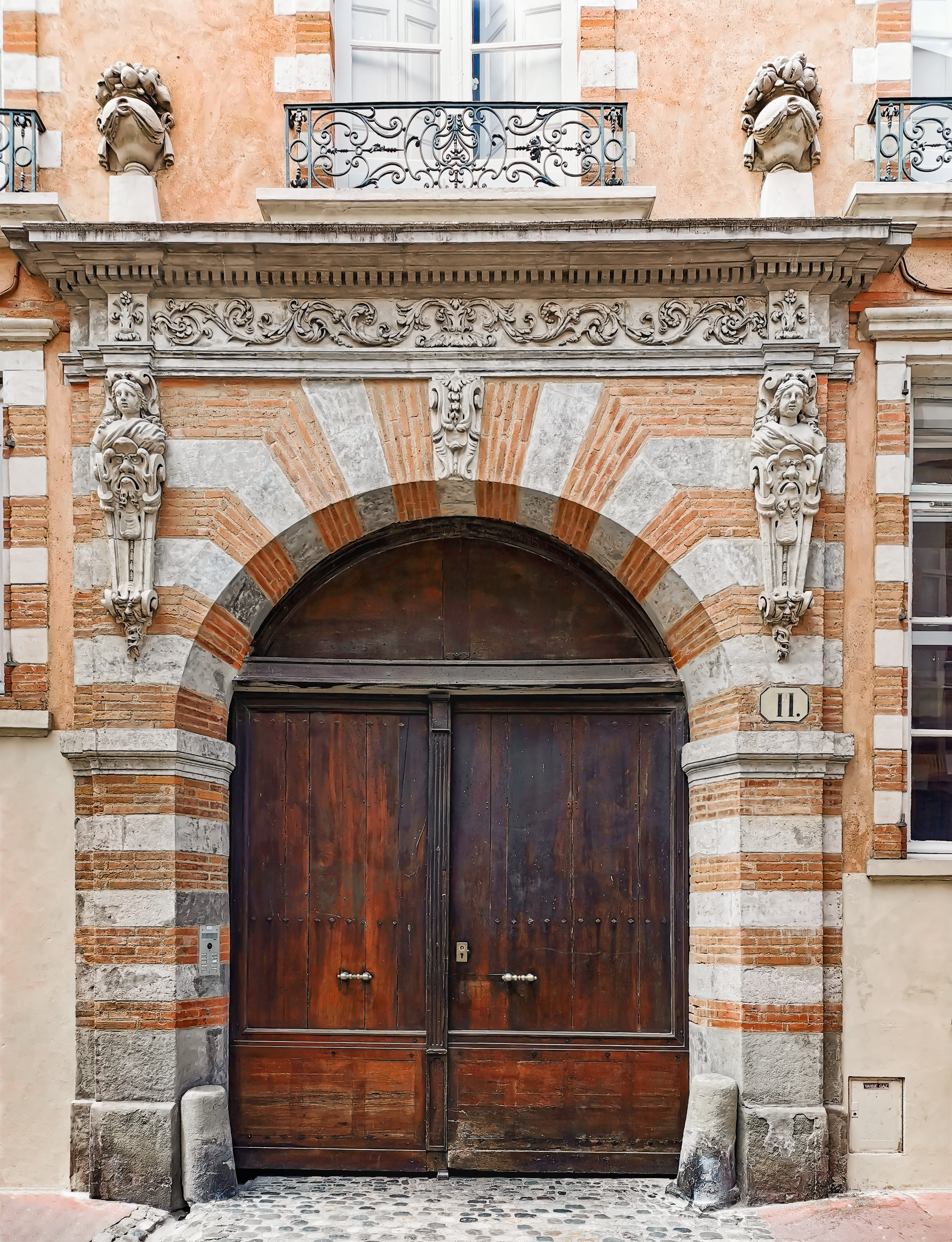
Portal of hôtel d'Orbessan

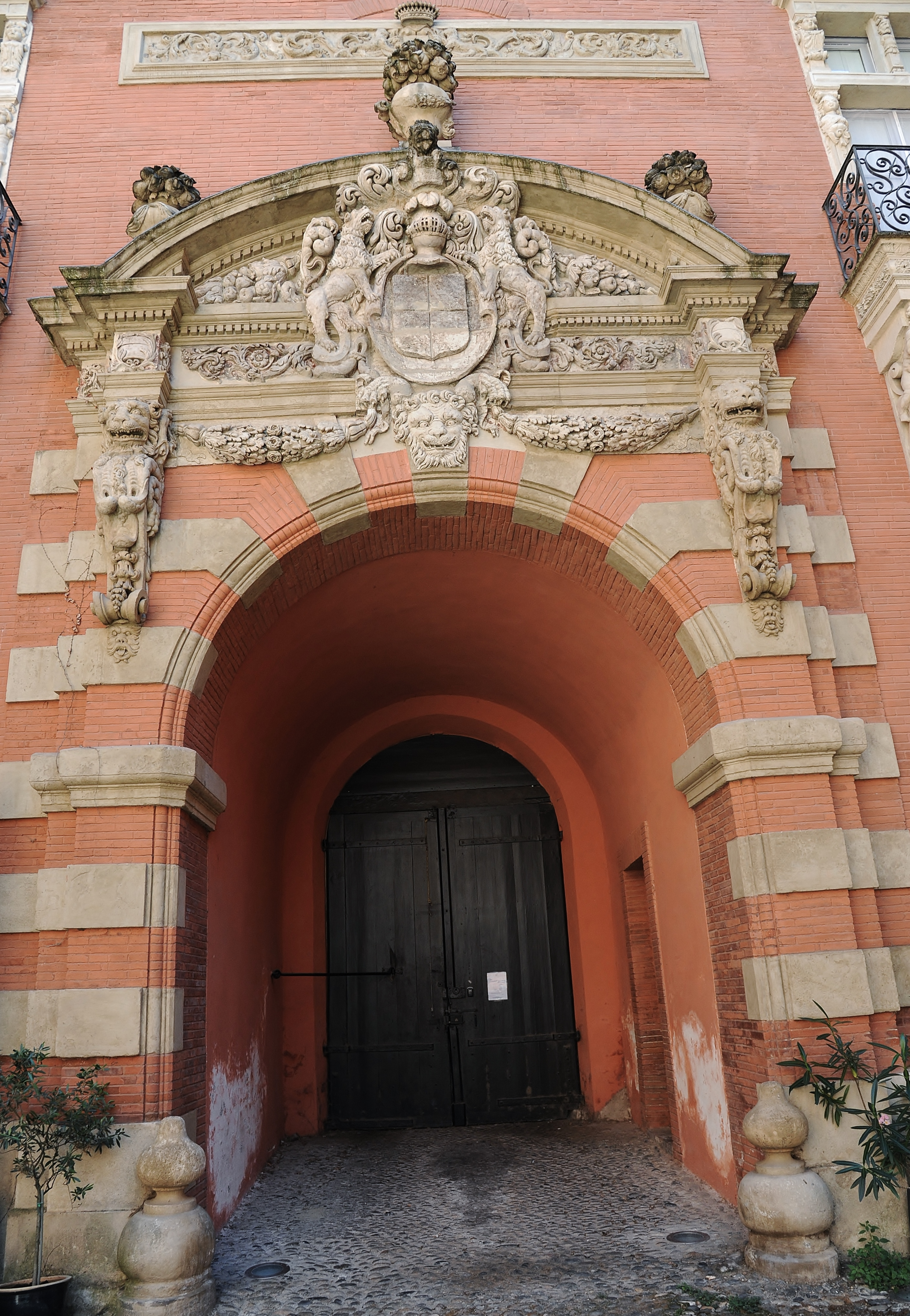
Portal of hôtel Desplats (courtyard)

=== 18th century architecture ===
In the 18th century Toulouse made its living from its parlement and from the wheat and corn trade, which was boosted by the creation of the Canal du Midi at the end of the previous century. Among the major architectural achievements, the most notable were undoubtedly the construction of the quays of the Garonne and the new facade of the Capitole (1750–1760), designed by architect Guillaume Cammas.

In the last third of the 18th century, the ever increasing influence of the Parisian model meant that red brick was no longer popular: the city facades were then whitewashed to imitate stone. This is why nowadays, even though the white paint has generally been removed, there are walls with deep grooves carved in brick to imitate ashlar architecture.

18th century architecture

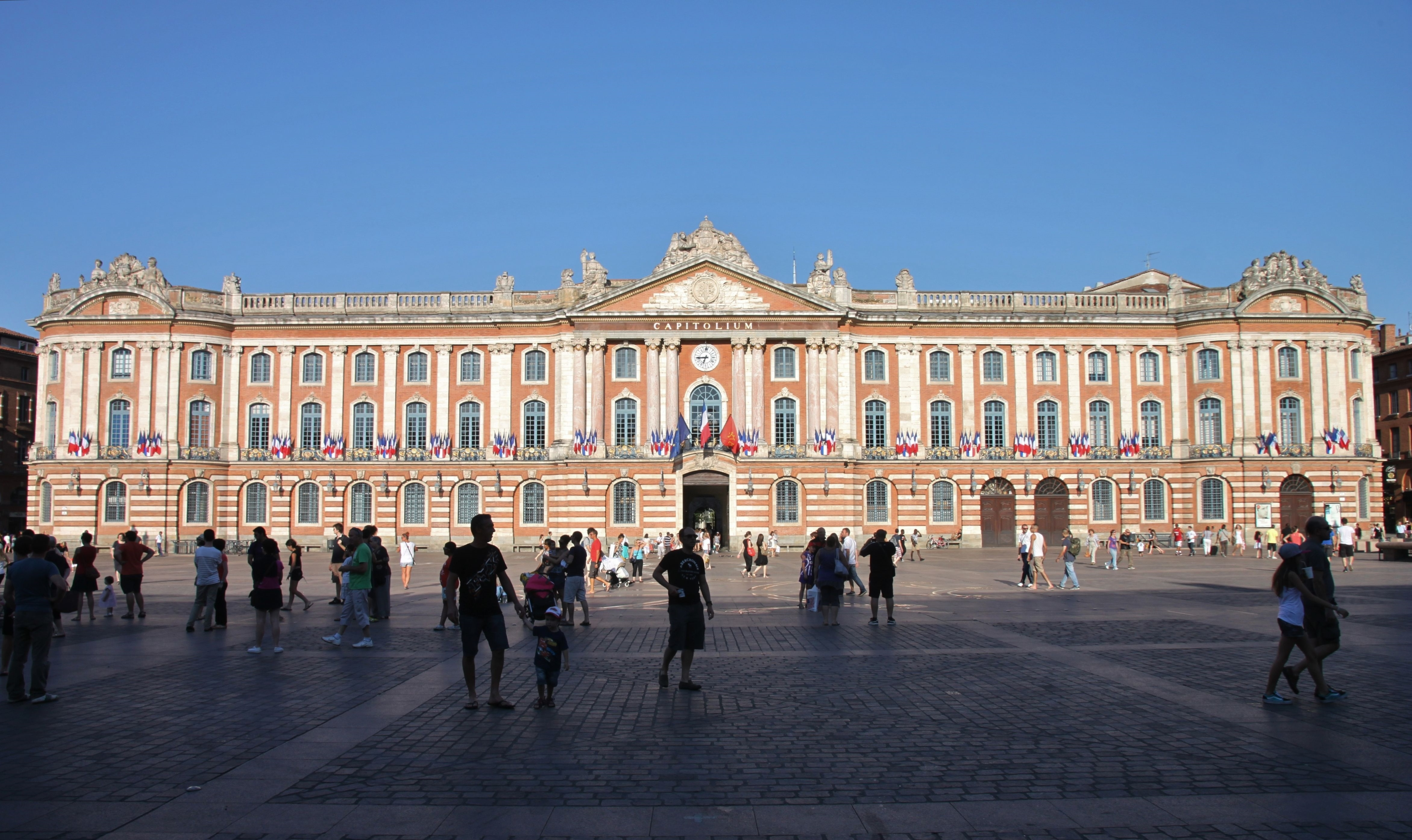
Capitole - city hall

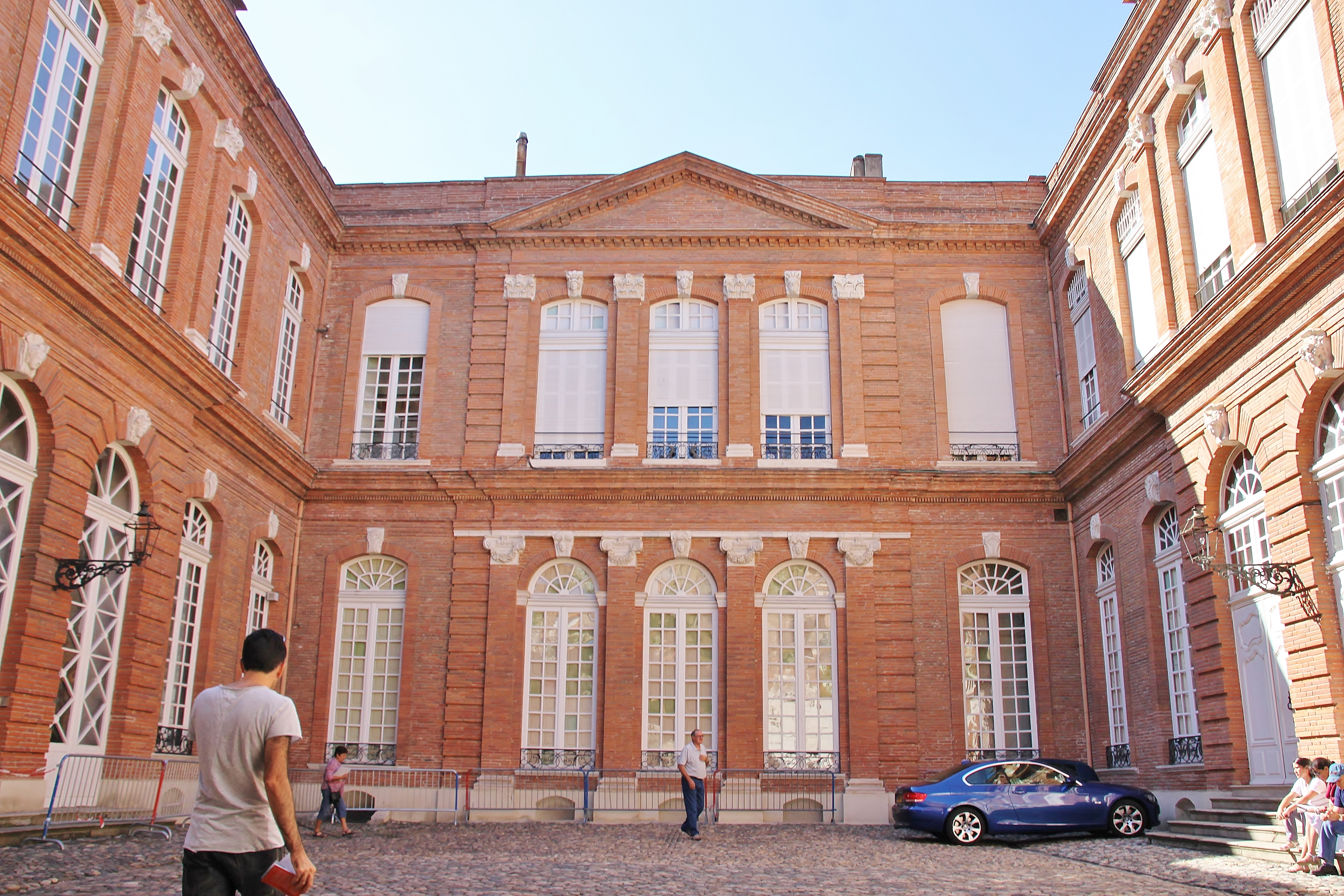
Hôtel d'Espie

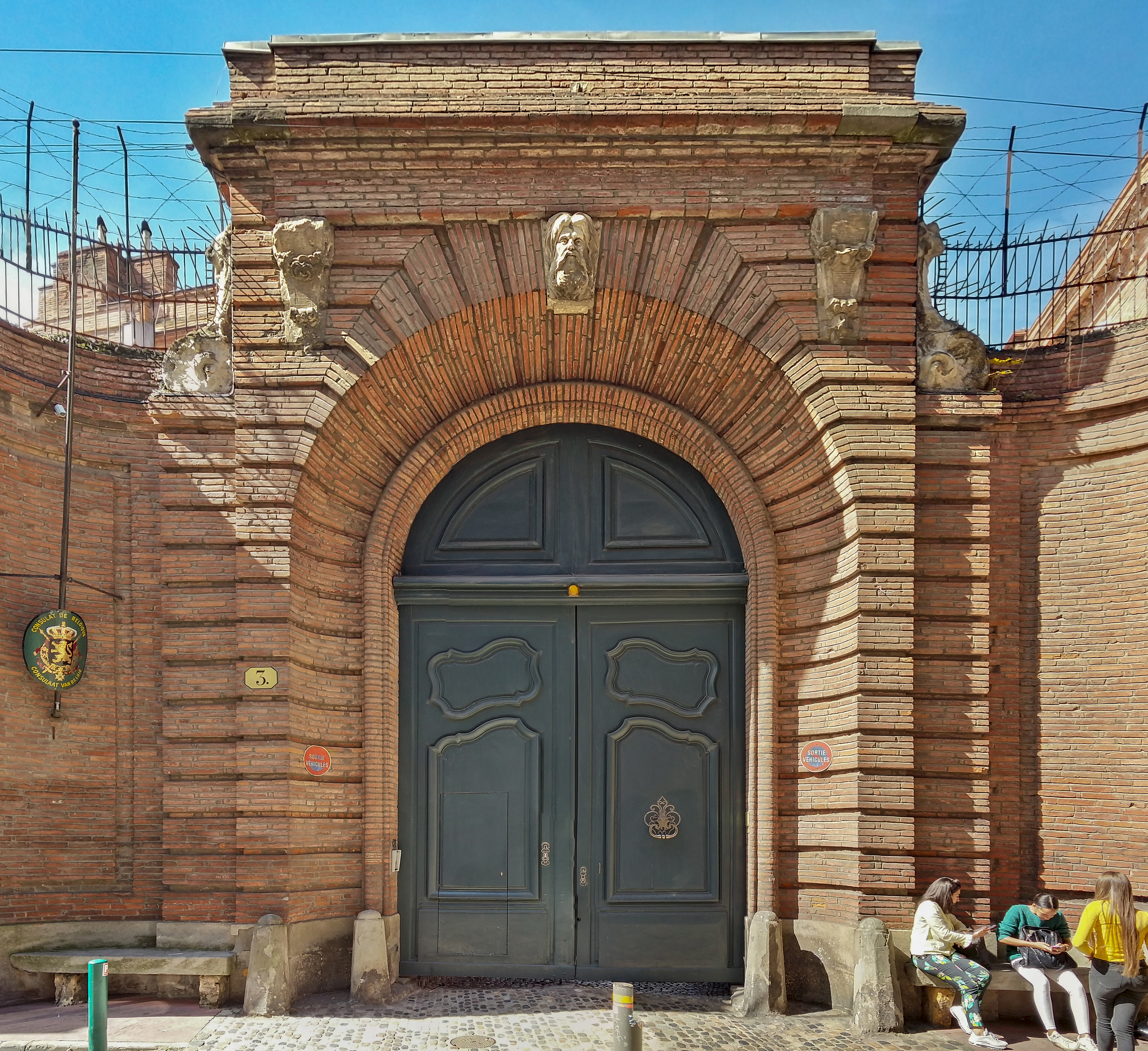
Portal of hôtel d'Espie

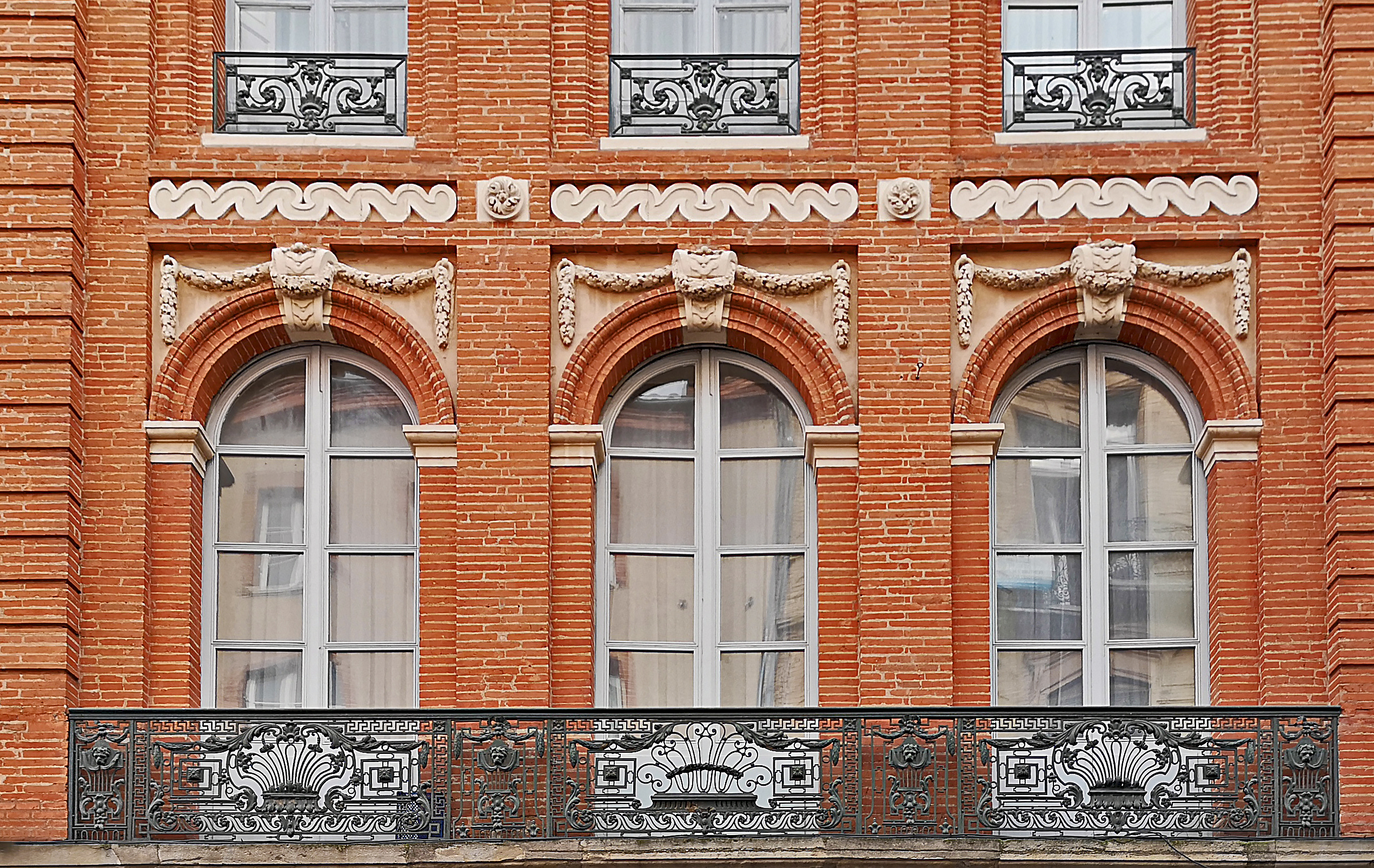
Hôtel de Bonfontan

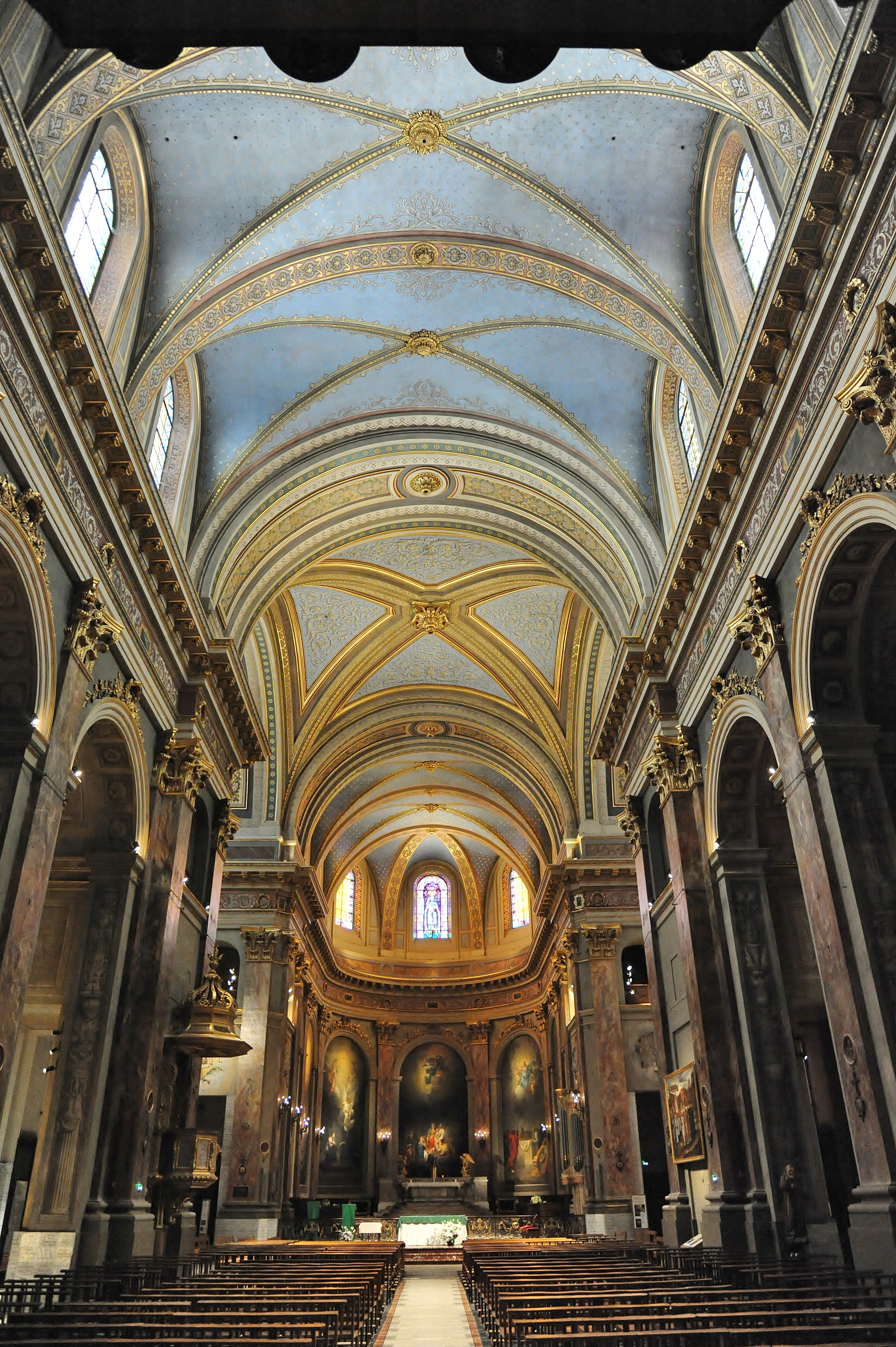
Basilica of la Daurade

=== 19th century architecture ===
Toulouse's 19th century architecture can be divided into three periods, which sometimes overlapped. In the first half of the century, at the instigation of architect Jacques-Pascal Virebent, the main architecturally unified squares were created: the Place du Capitole and the Place Wilson (called place Villeneuve when it was built), whose uniform architecture was inspired by Rue de Rivoli in Paris.

From 1830 onwards, Auguste Virebent and his brothers (sons of Jacques-Pascal) developed a factory of low-cost moulded decorations which met with great success and adorned Toulouse facades with numerous terracotta ornaments, far from the austere architecture of their father.

Then, in the last third of the 19th century, large Haussmann-style avenues were opened in the town centre, such as the central Alsace-Lorraine street, built in yellow brick to imitate Parisian stone.

19th century architecture

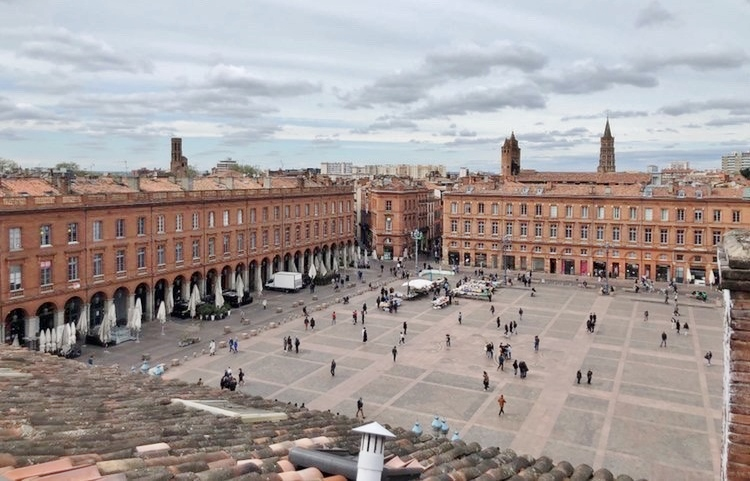
Place du Capitole, the main square of Toulouse (19th c.)

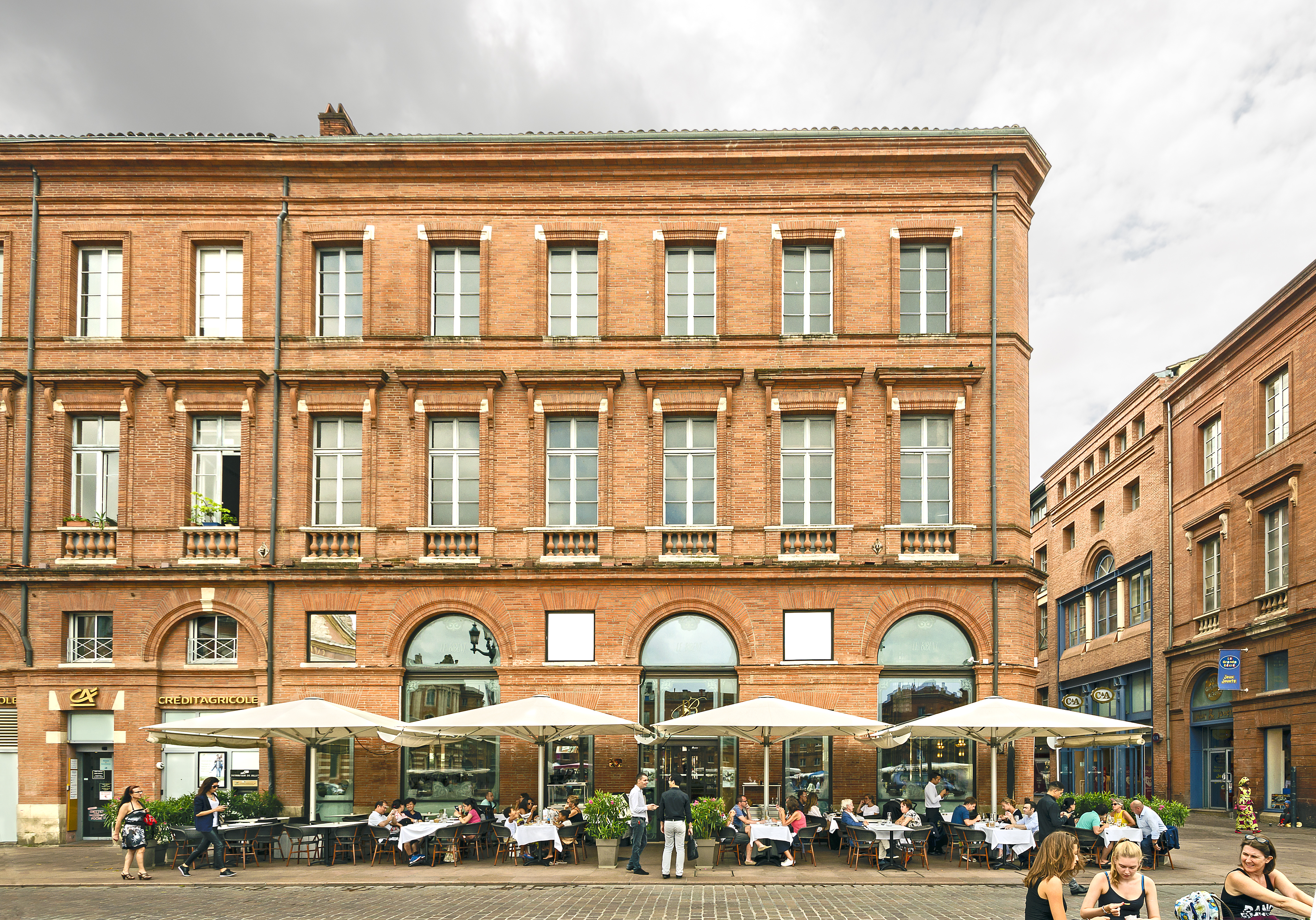
Place du Capitole (Café Bibent)

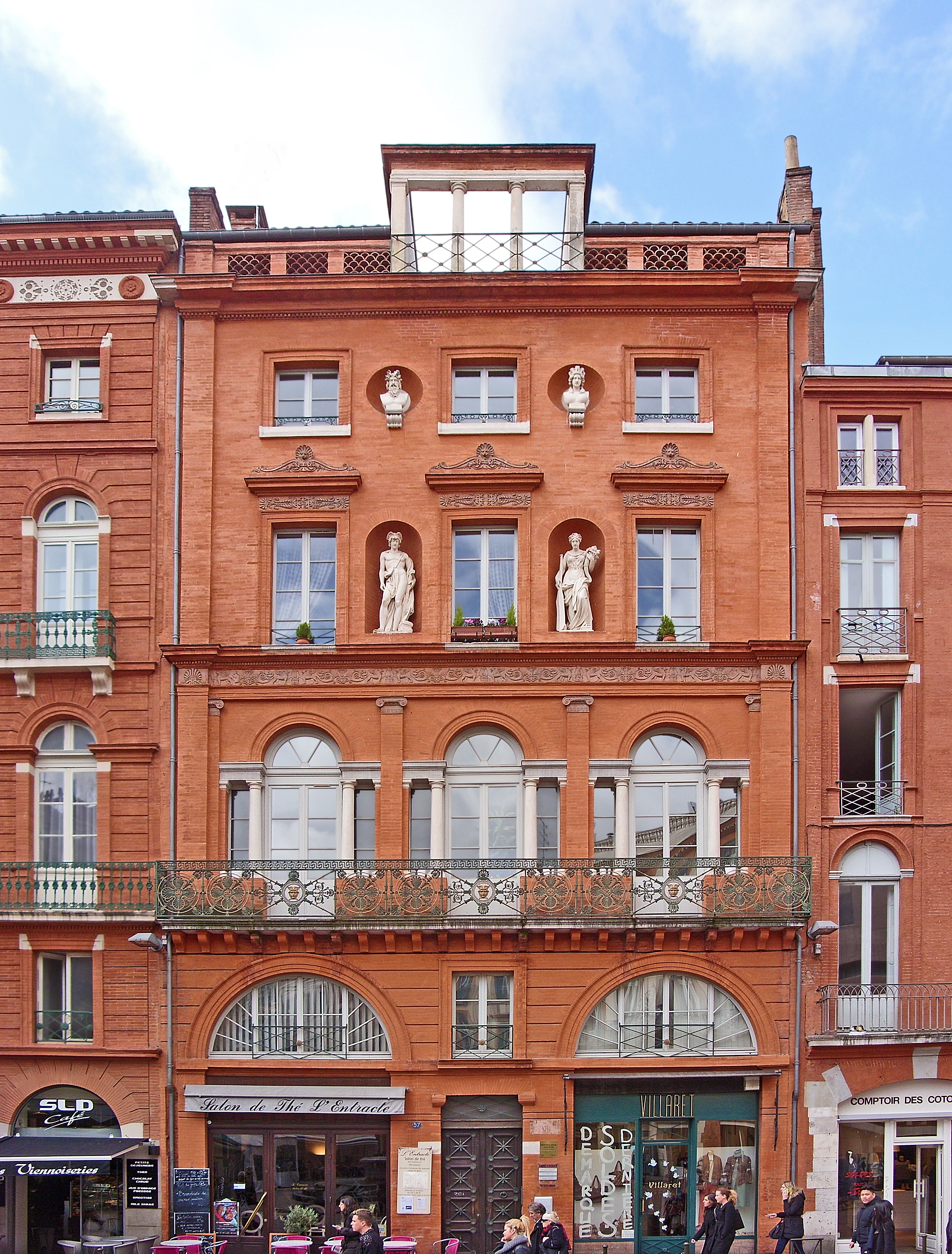
Facade with moulded terracotta decorations (19th c.)

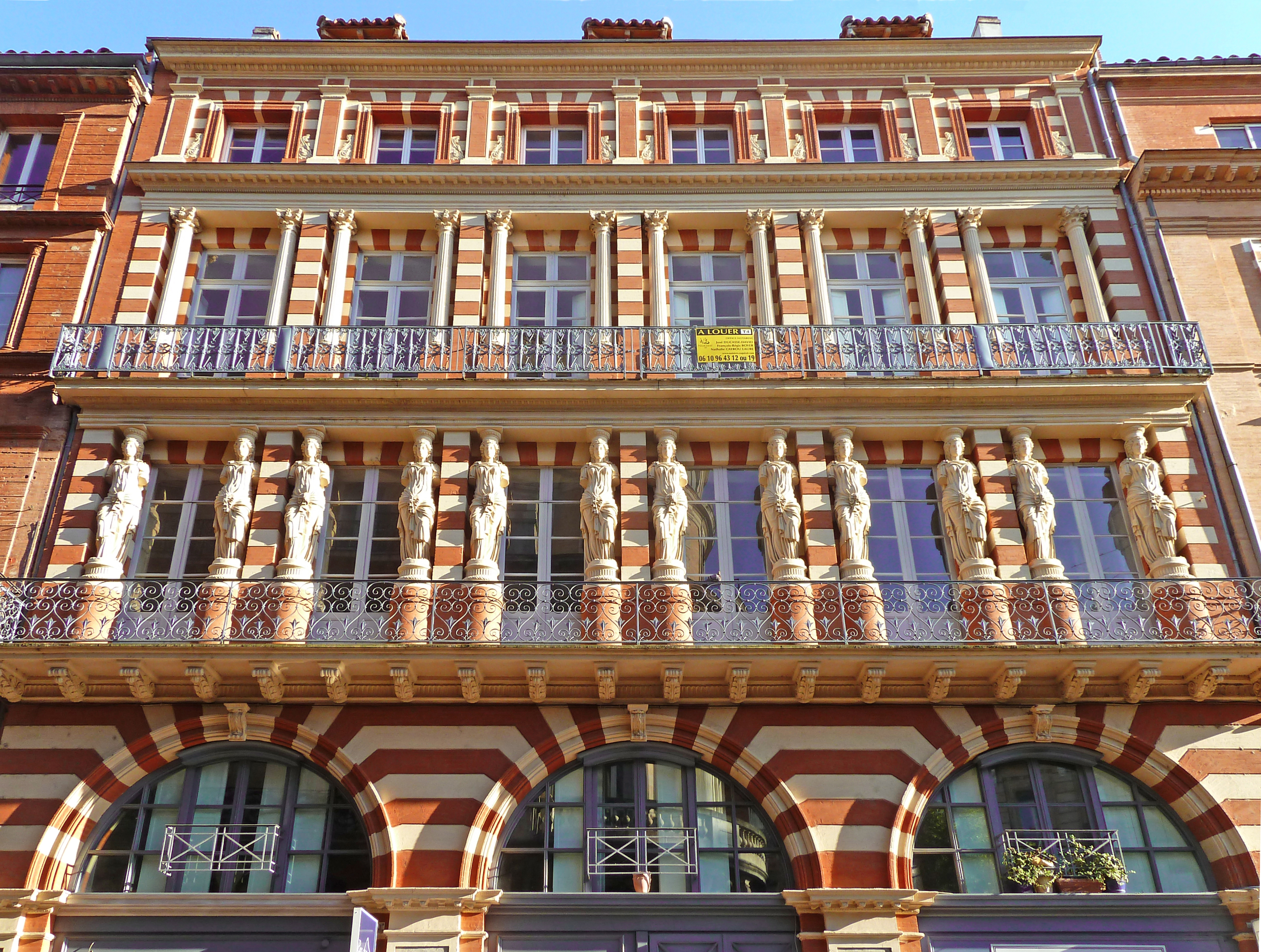
Facade with moulded terracotta decorations (19th c.)

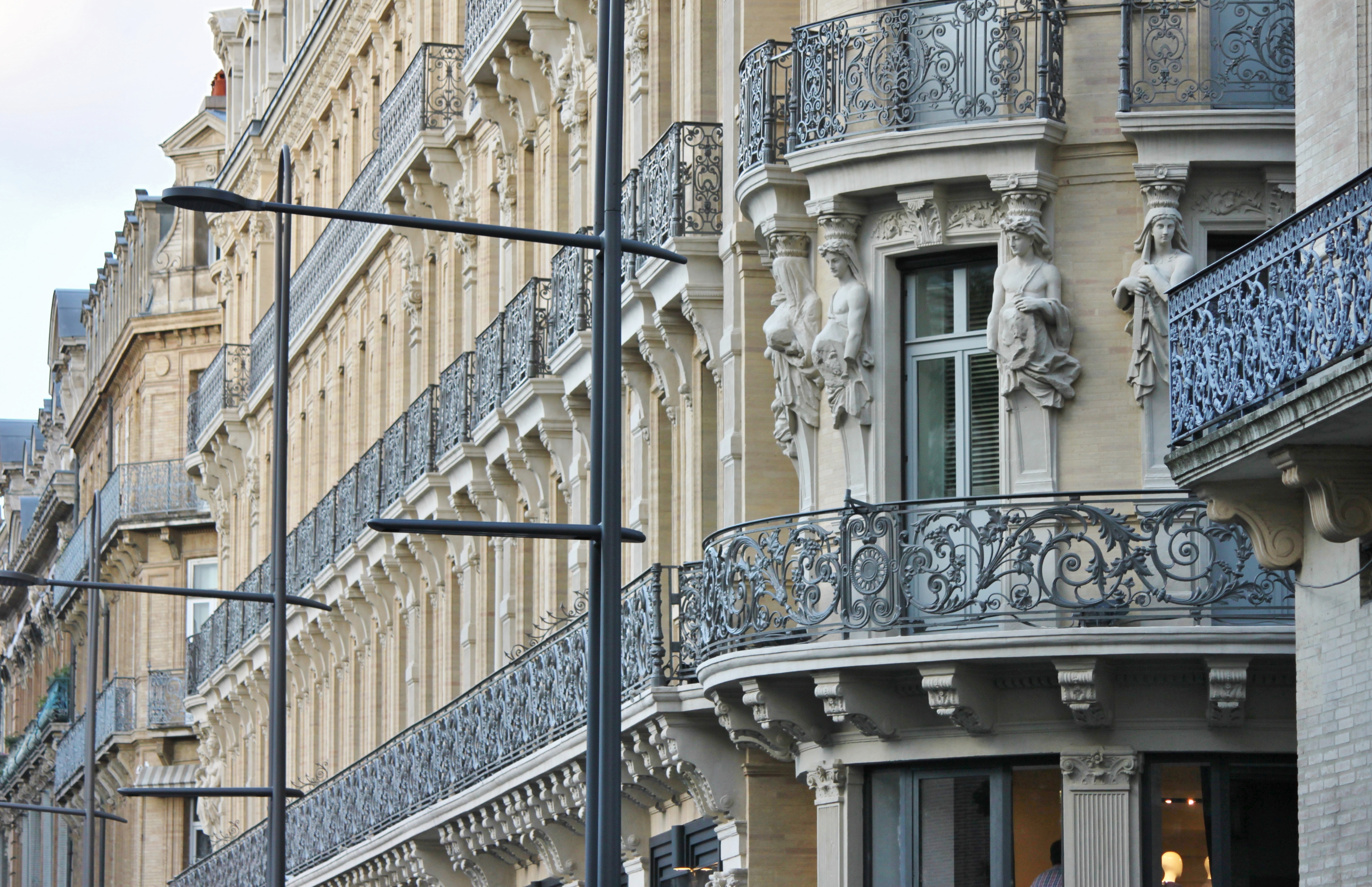
Yellow brick of Alsace-Lorraine street (19th c.)

=== 20th and 21st centuries architecture ===
From the middle of the 19th century, the arrival of the railway in Toulouse facilitated the supply of stone and made it cheaper for construction, and architects did not hesitate to play on the old traditional Toulouse codes linked to the prestige of stone construction, even if these no longer had the economic justification of yesteryear. Thus, at the beginning of the 20th century, the main railway station was built entirely in white stone.

Subsequently, concrete replaced the traditional materials, but brick and stone were still used for cladding, as shown recently by the work of prestigious architects such as Robert Venturi and Denise Scott Brown for the seat of the departmental council, or Shelley McNamara and Yvonne Farrell for the Toulouse School of Economics building.

20th and 21st centuries architecture

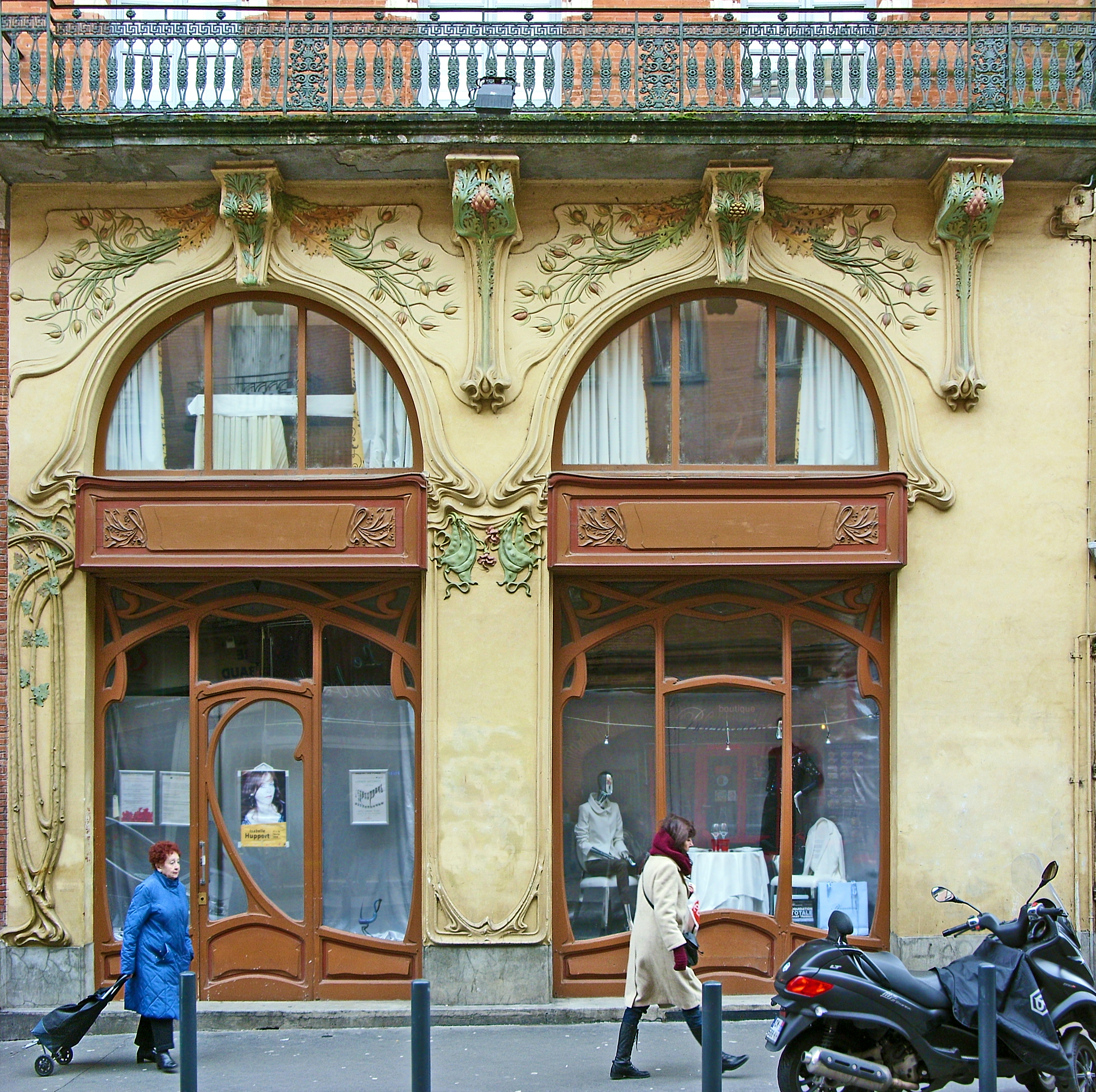
Art nouveau facade, Gambetta street (early 20th c.)

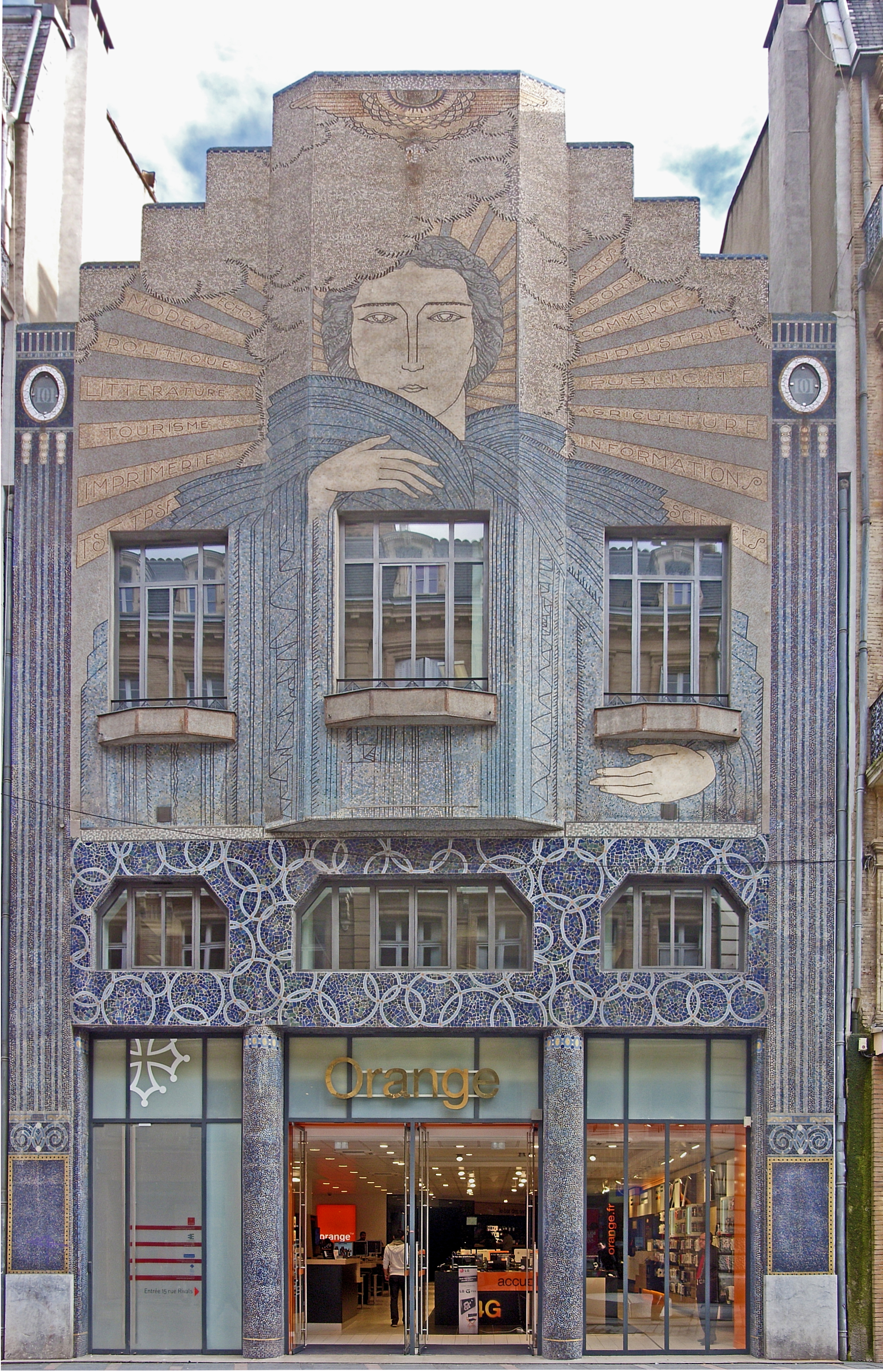
Art Deco facade, Alsace-Lorraine street (c. 1930)

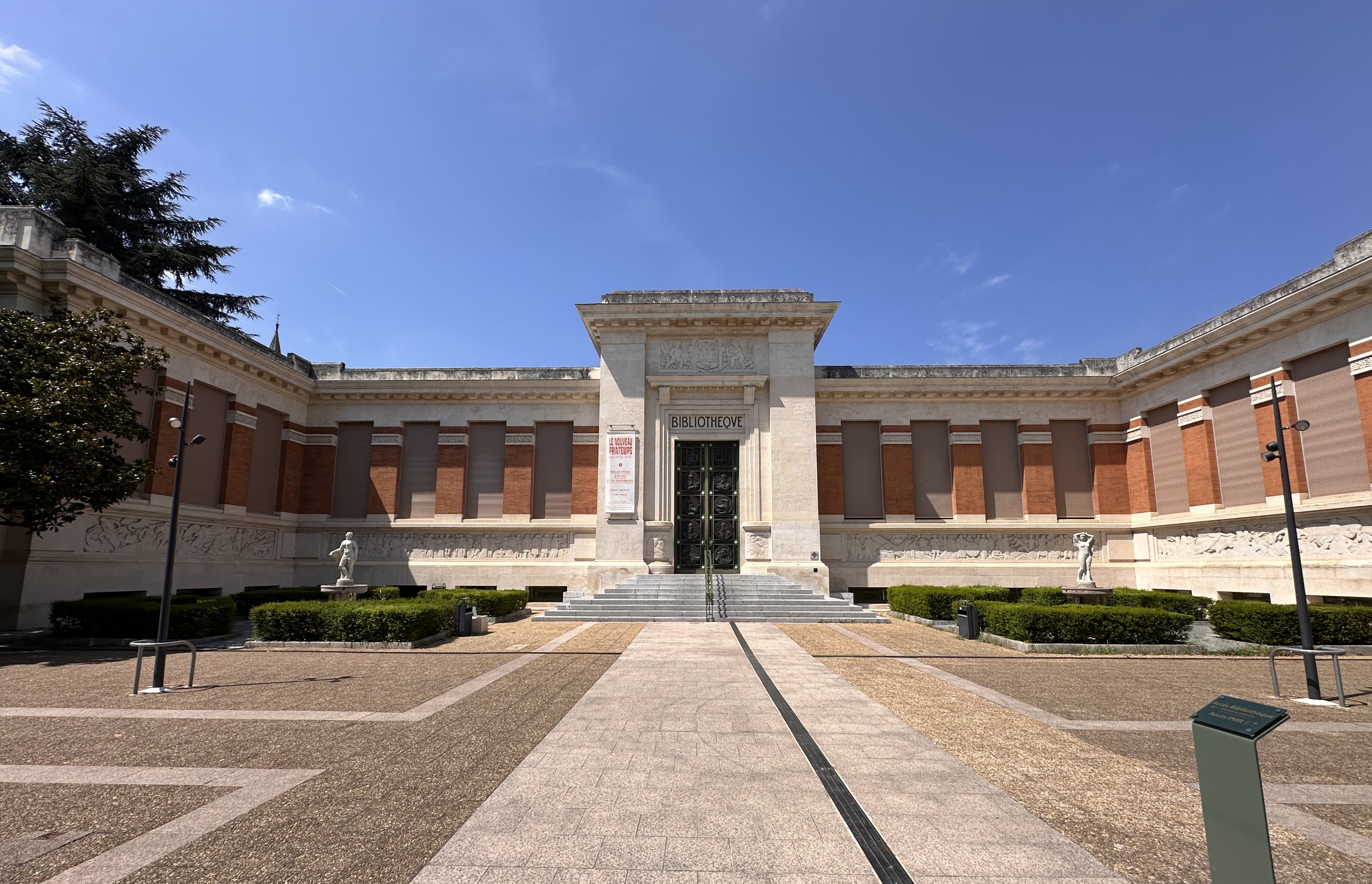
Toulouse municipal library, Art Deco facade (1935)

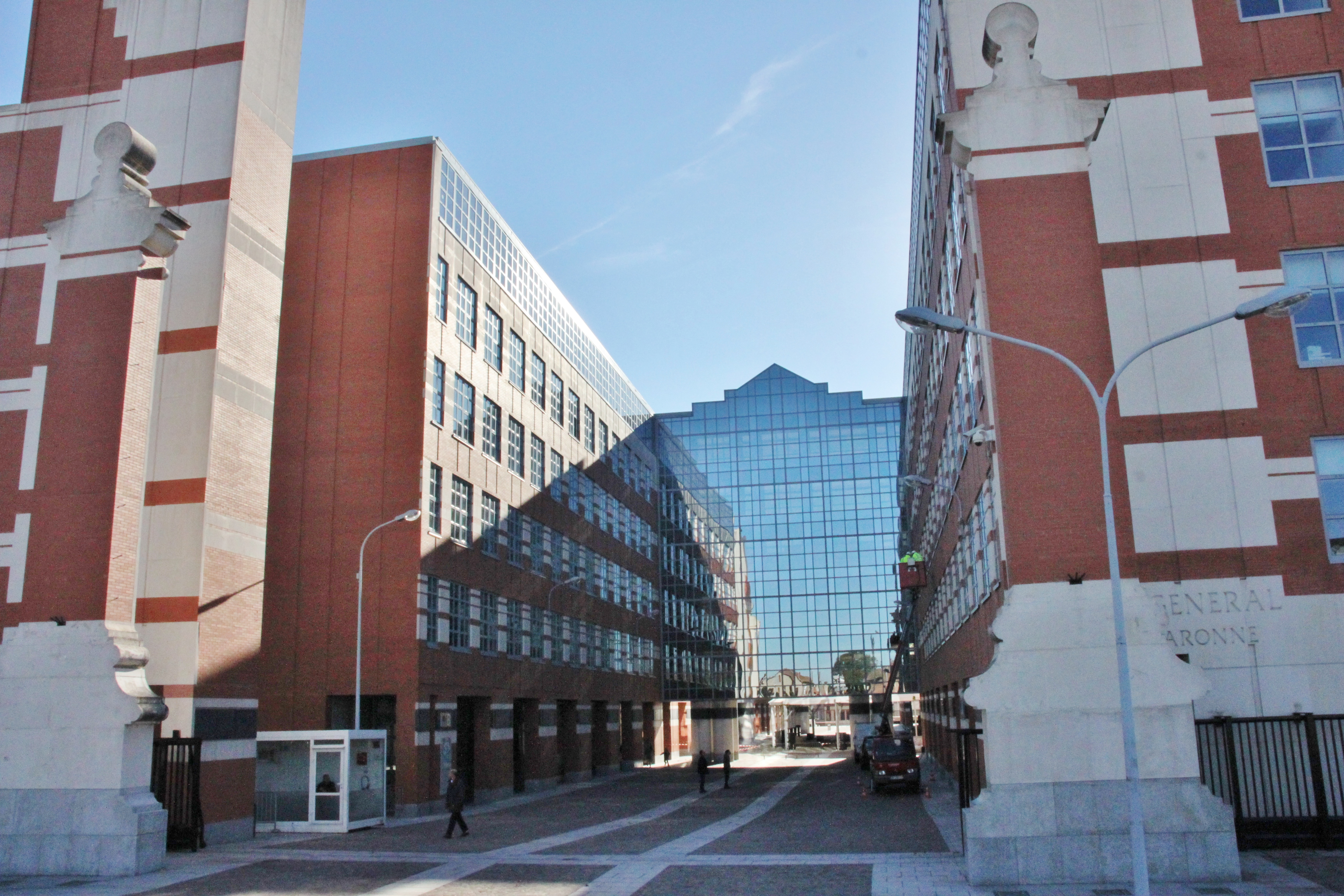
Seat of the departmental council (1999), by the architect Robert Venturi, winner of the Pritzker Architecture Prize in 1991

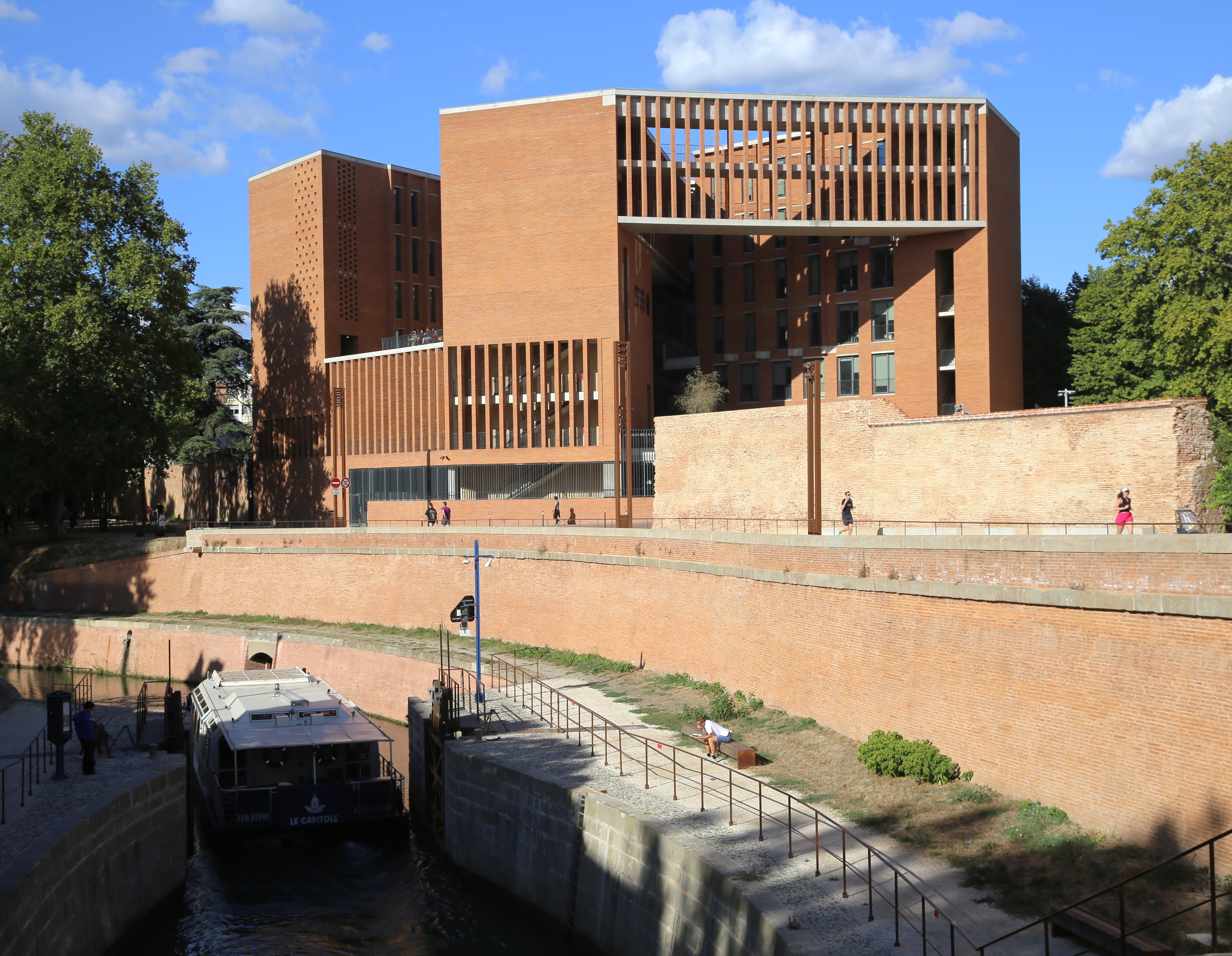
Seat of the Toulouse School of Economics (2019), by Grafton Architects, winner of the Pritzker Architecture Prize in 2020

=== Banks of the Garonne, Canal du Midi, parks ===
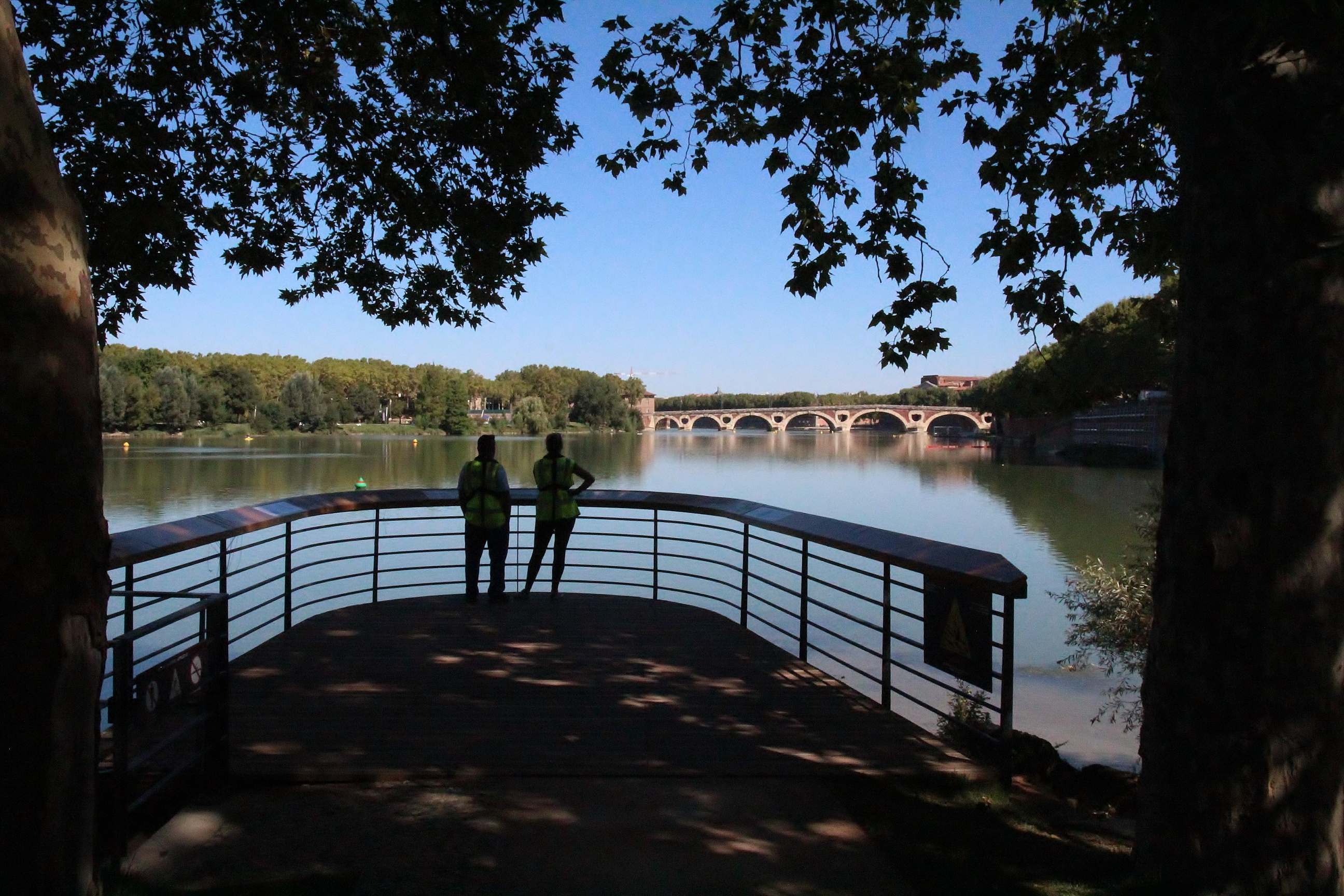
Numerous parks and green spaces line the Garonne in the heart of Toulouse.

The banks of the Garonne river offer an interesting urban panorama of the city. Red brick dykes from the 18th century enclose the river which was subject to destructive floods. The Pont-Neuf took almost a century to build as the project was so ambitious (1545–1632). It was a very modern bridge for its time, removing the housing on the deck and using techniques such as lowered arches, openings in the piers and stacked spouts to spread the water, making it the only bridge in Toulouse to withstand the violent floods of the past. Further downstream, the Bazacle is a ford across the Garonne river, in the 12th century the Bazacle Milling Company was the first recorded European joint-stock company. On the left bank of the river, historically a flood-prone bank, stand two former hospitals whose origins date back to the 12th century: the Hôtel-Dieu Saint-Jacques and the Hôpital de La Grave. Isolated on the left bank, victims of the plague and other sick people were thus kept away from the city by the width of the river.

Built at the end of the 17th century, the Canal du Midi bypasses the city centre and has linked Toulouse to the Mediterranean Sea ever since. Its 240 kilometres were inscribed as a UNESCO World Heritage Site in 1996.

The Jardin des Plantes, the Grand Rond and the Jardin Royal form a set of adjacent parks that span several blocks and include the Museum of Natural History, cafés, children's activities and a botanical garden (18th–19th century). The Prairie des Filtres, the Raymond VI garden and the Japanese garden are other interesting parks that border the center of Toulouse.

Banks of the Garonne, Canal du Midi, parks

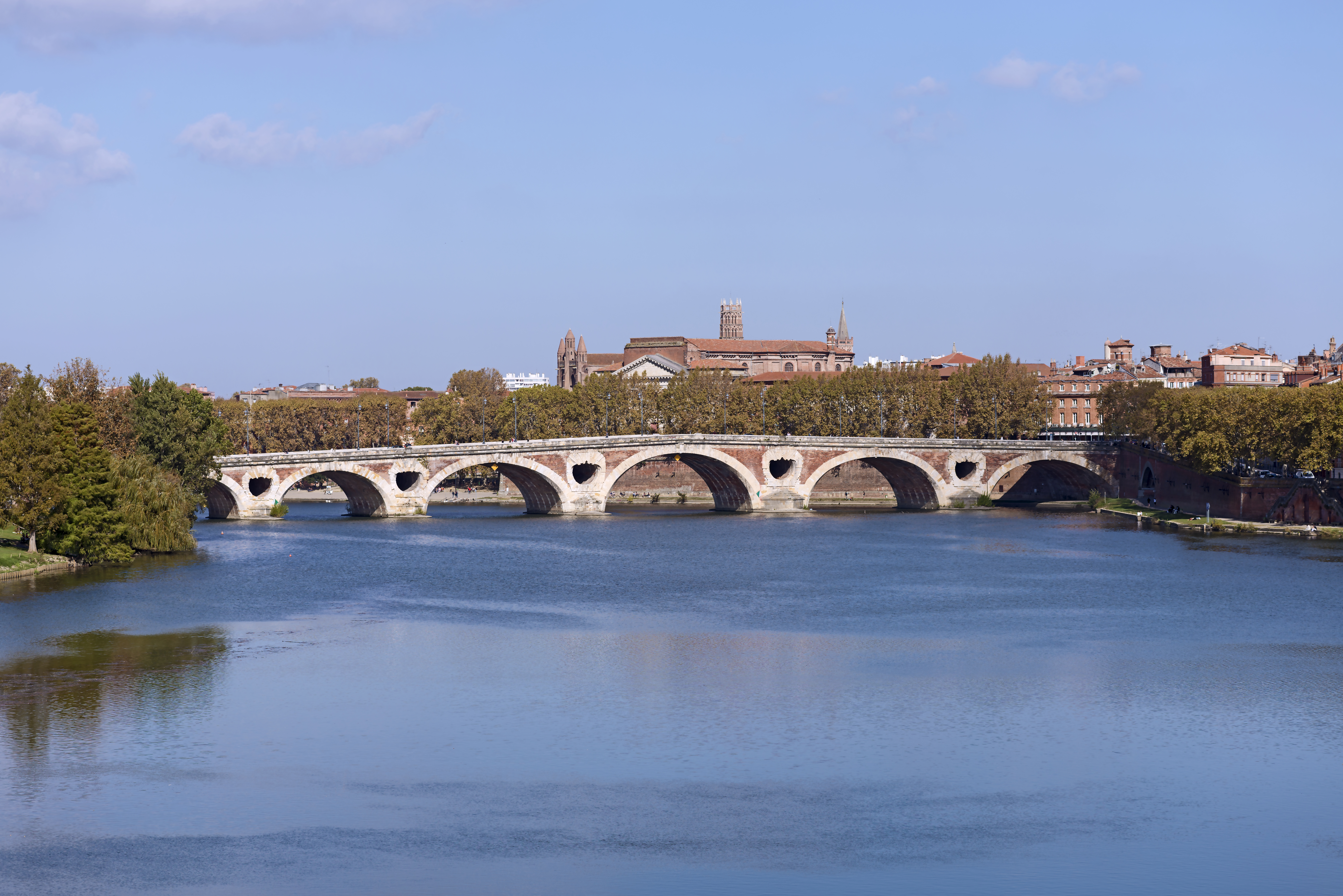
Pont-Neuf (16th-17th c.)

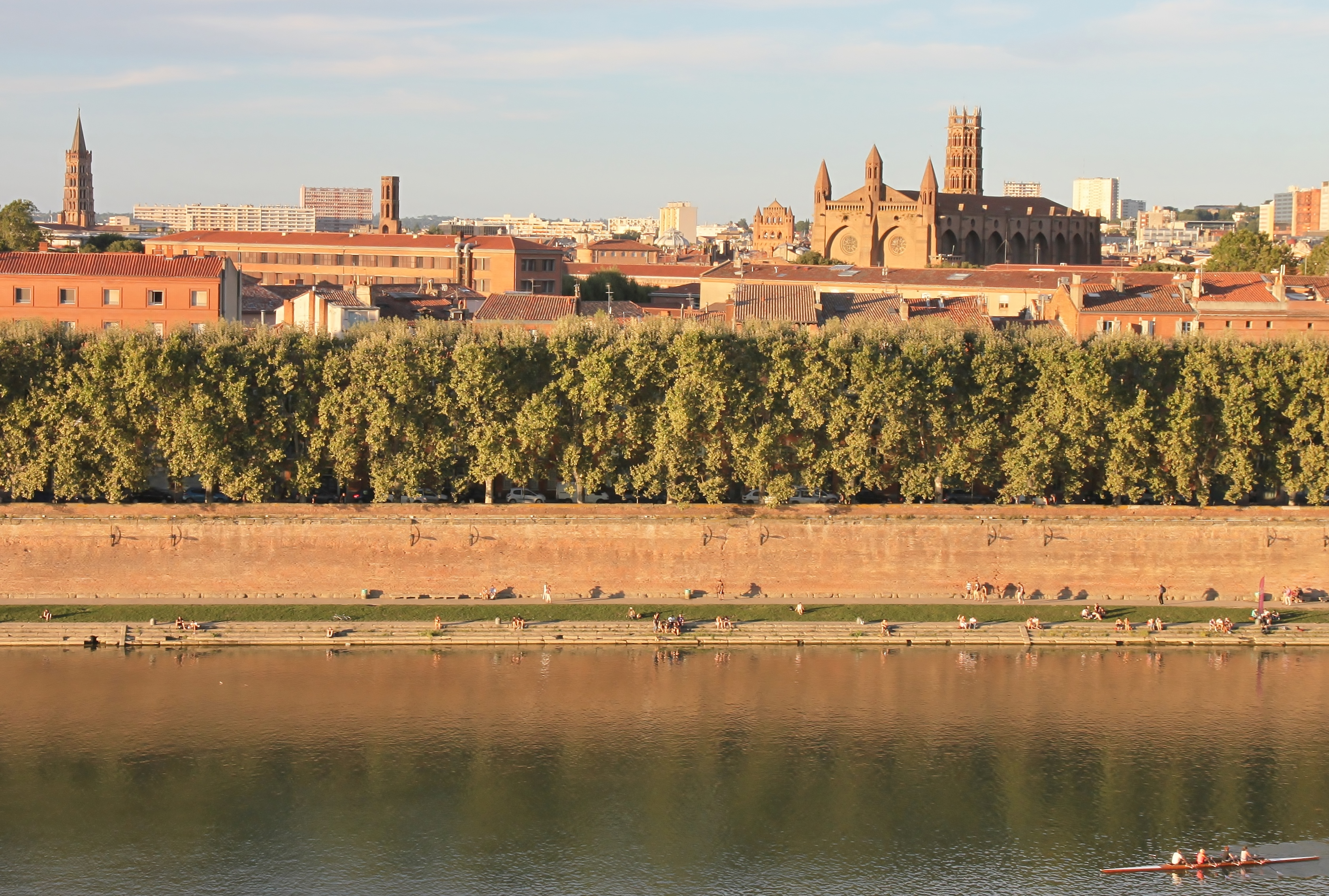
Red brick dykes from the 18th century

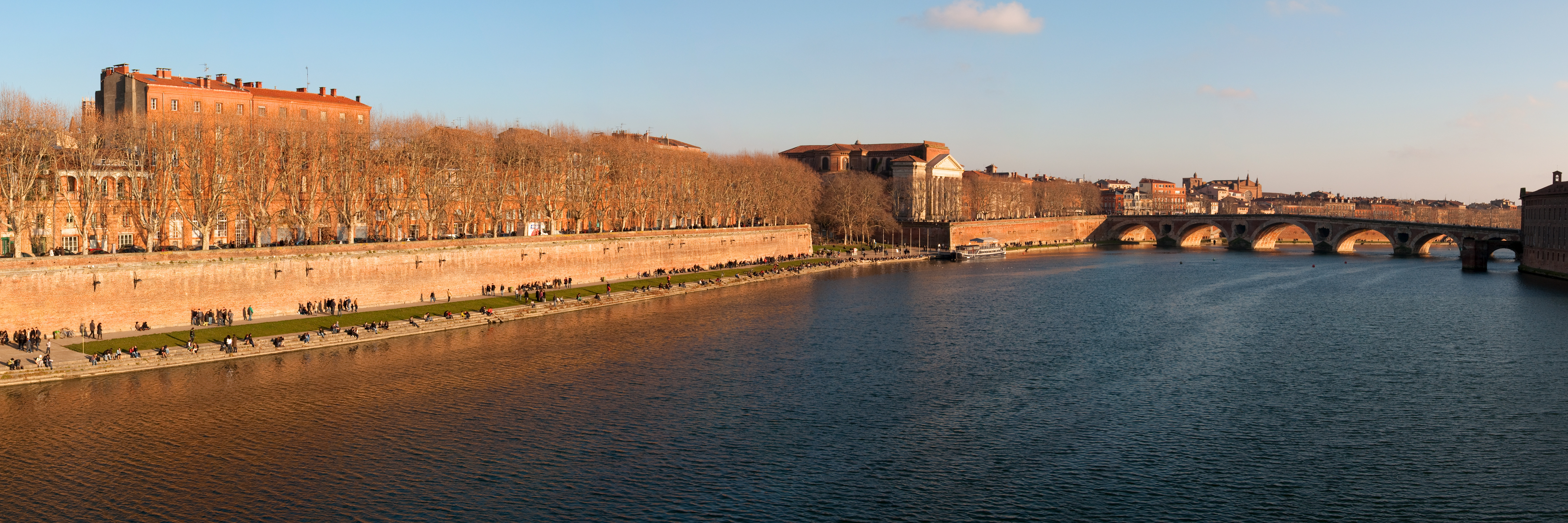
Quays of the Garonne and Pont-Neuf

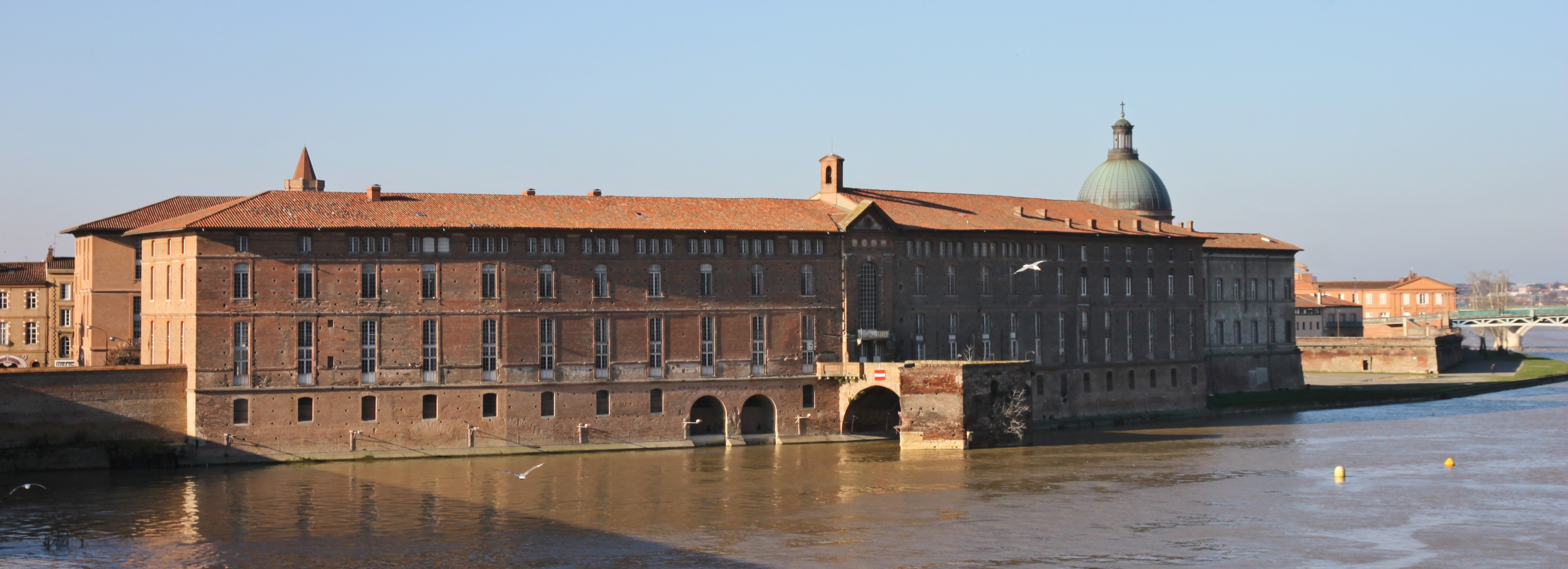
Hôtel-Dieu Saint-Jacques former hospital (12th–19th c.)

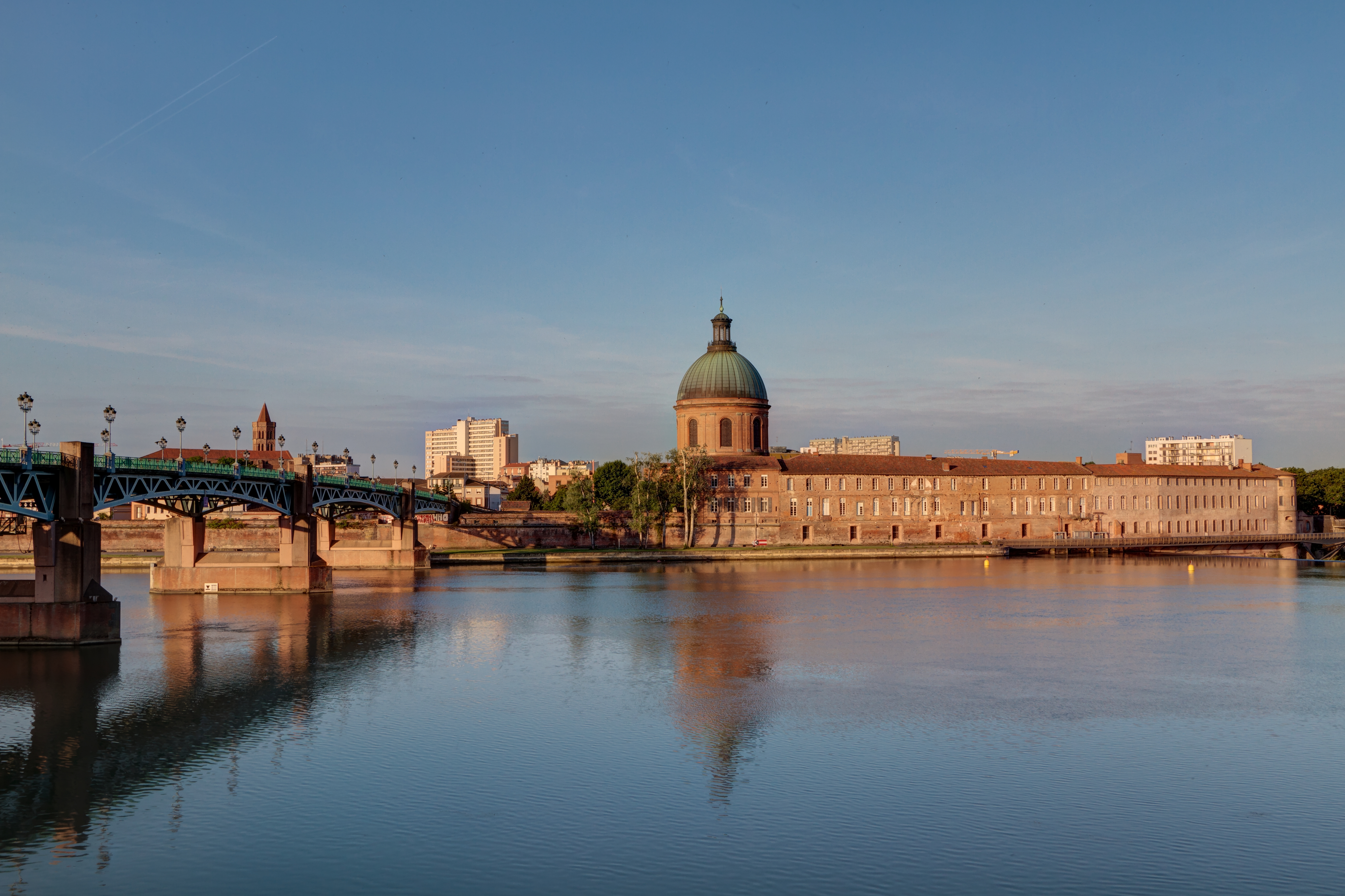
La Grave former hospital (12th–19th c.) and the copper dome of its chapel

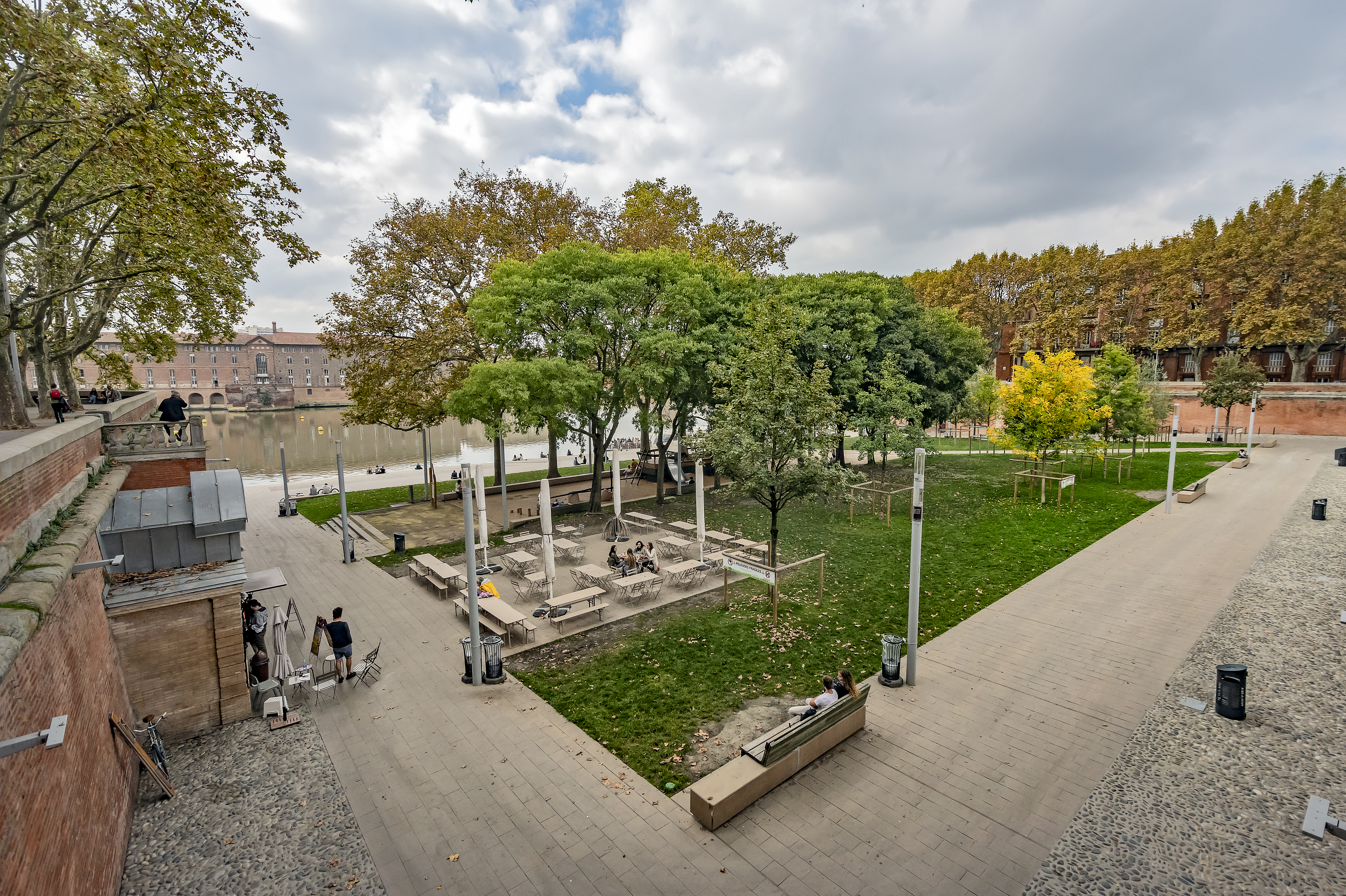
Port de la Daurade, a former river port converted into a recreational area

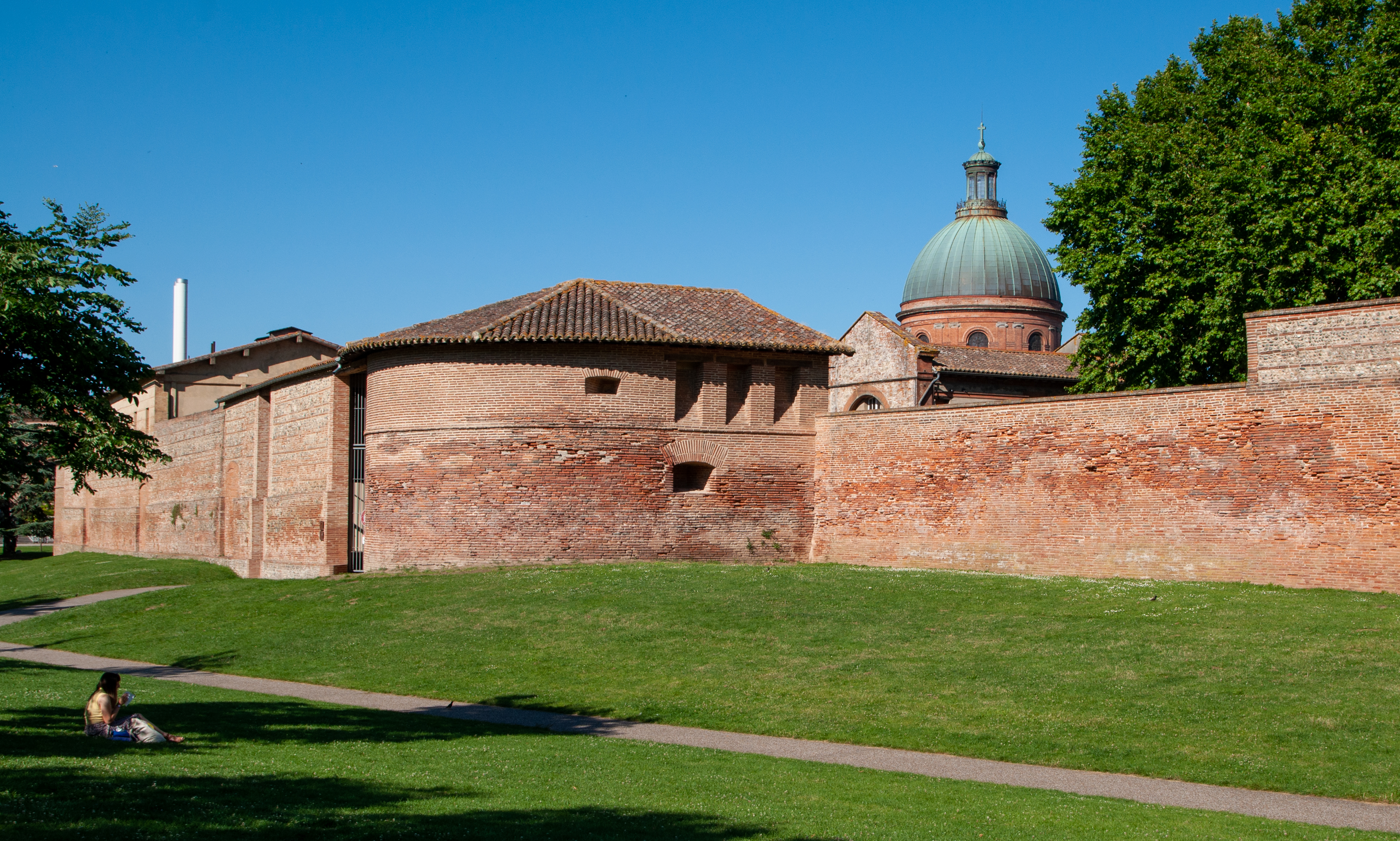
Raymond VI garden, at the foot of the last remains of the old Toulouse ramparts on the left bank

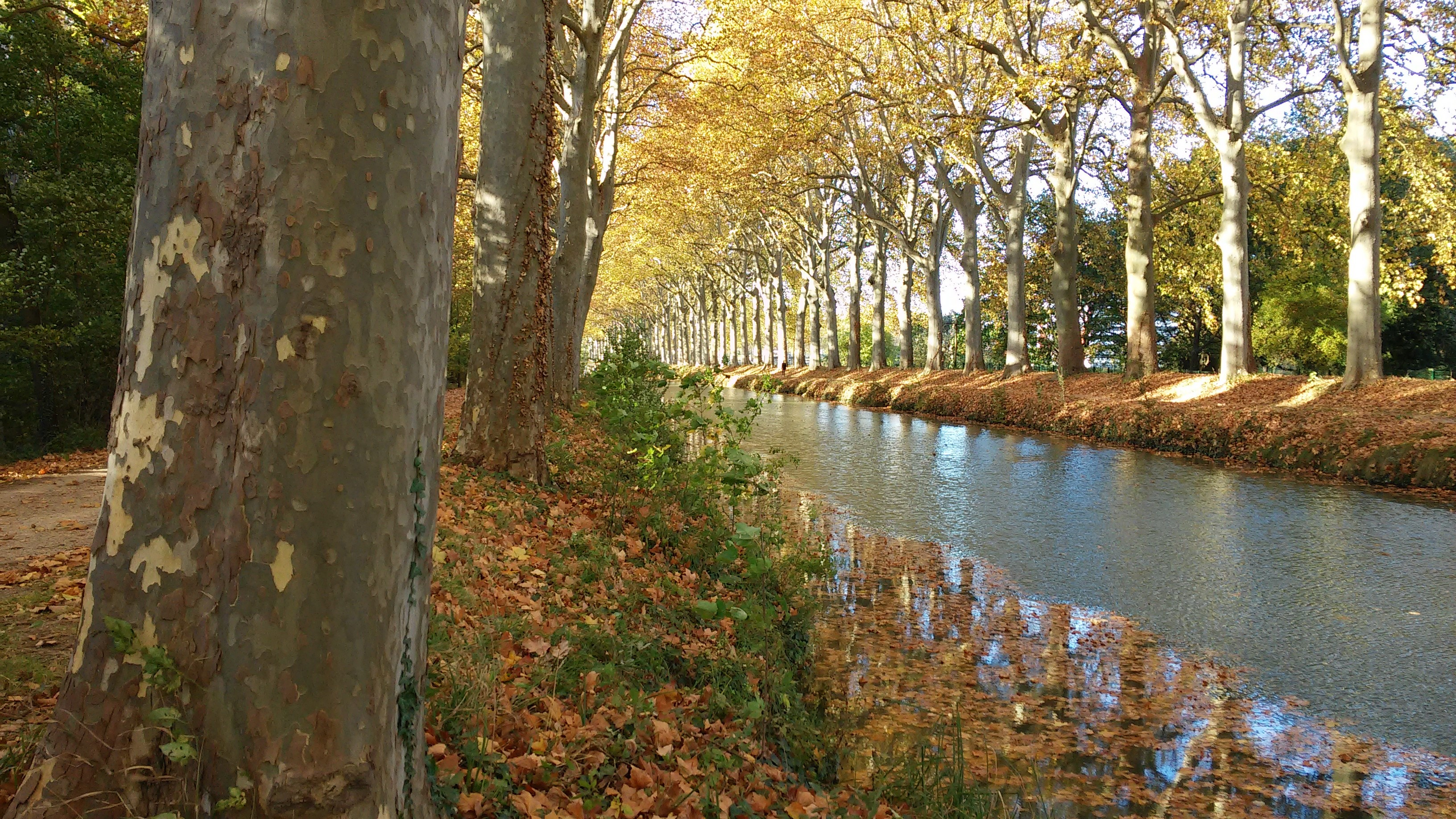
Canal du Midi (17th c.)

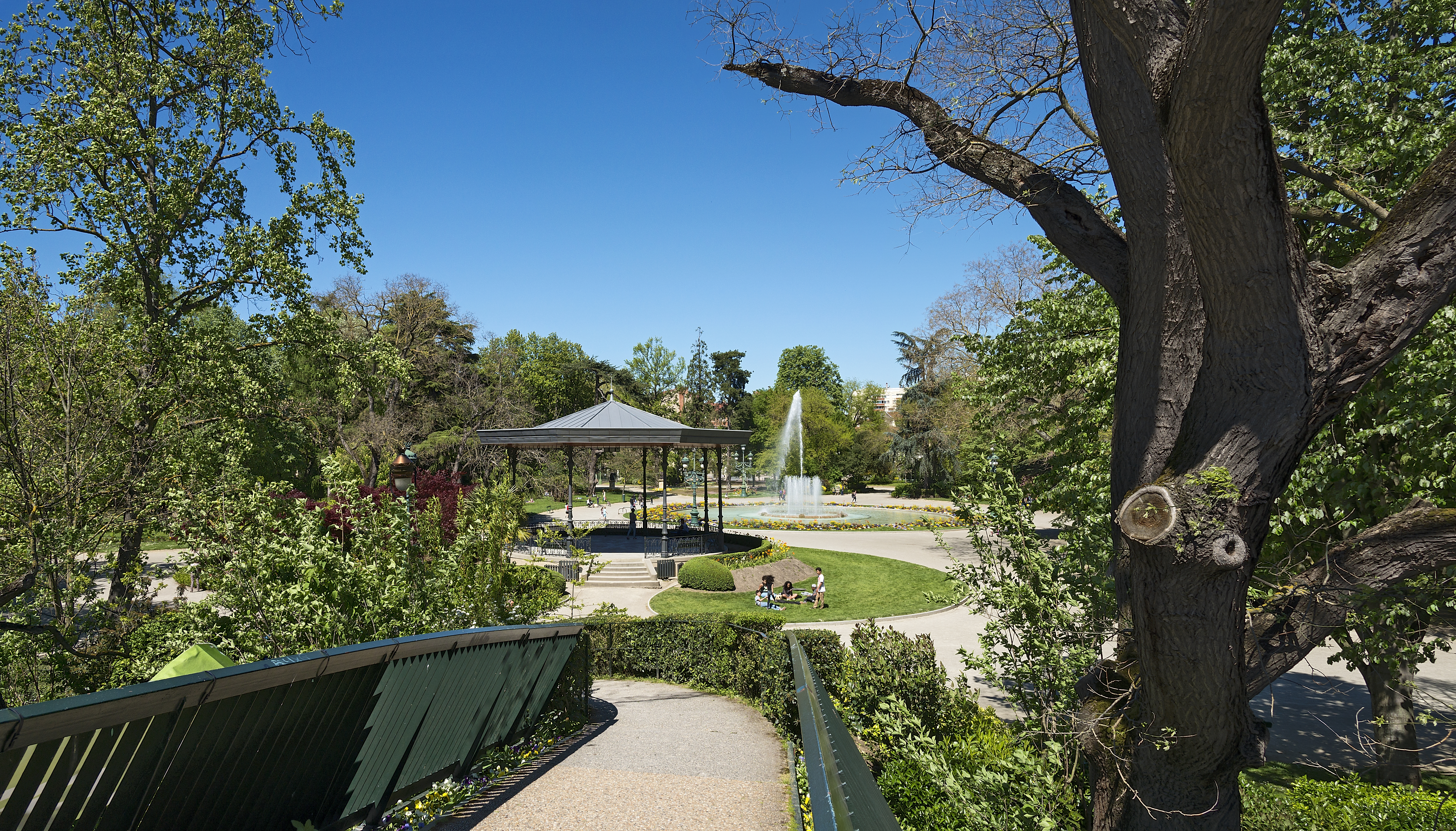
Grand rond park

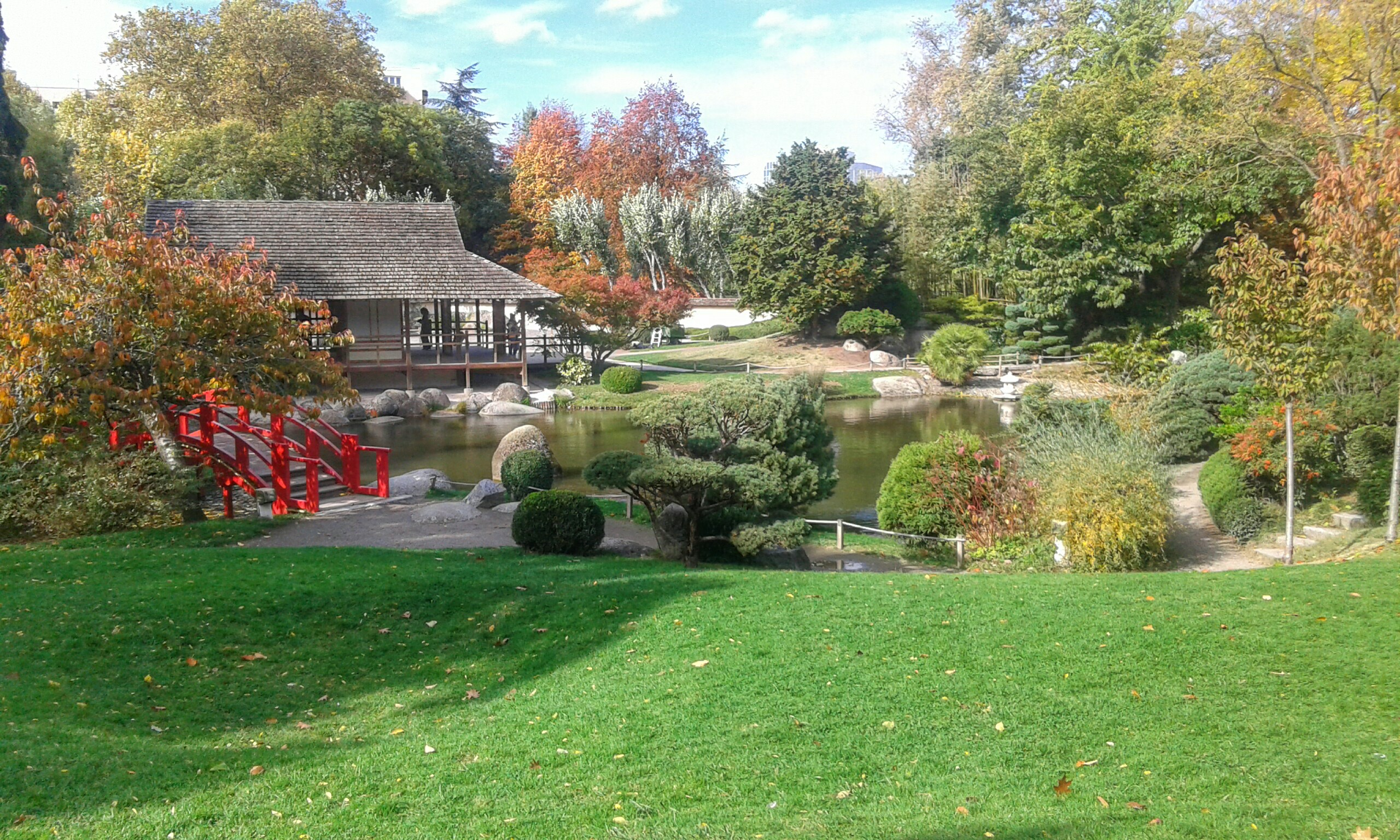
Japanese garden

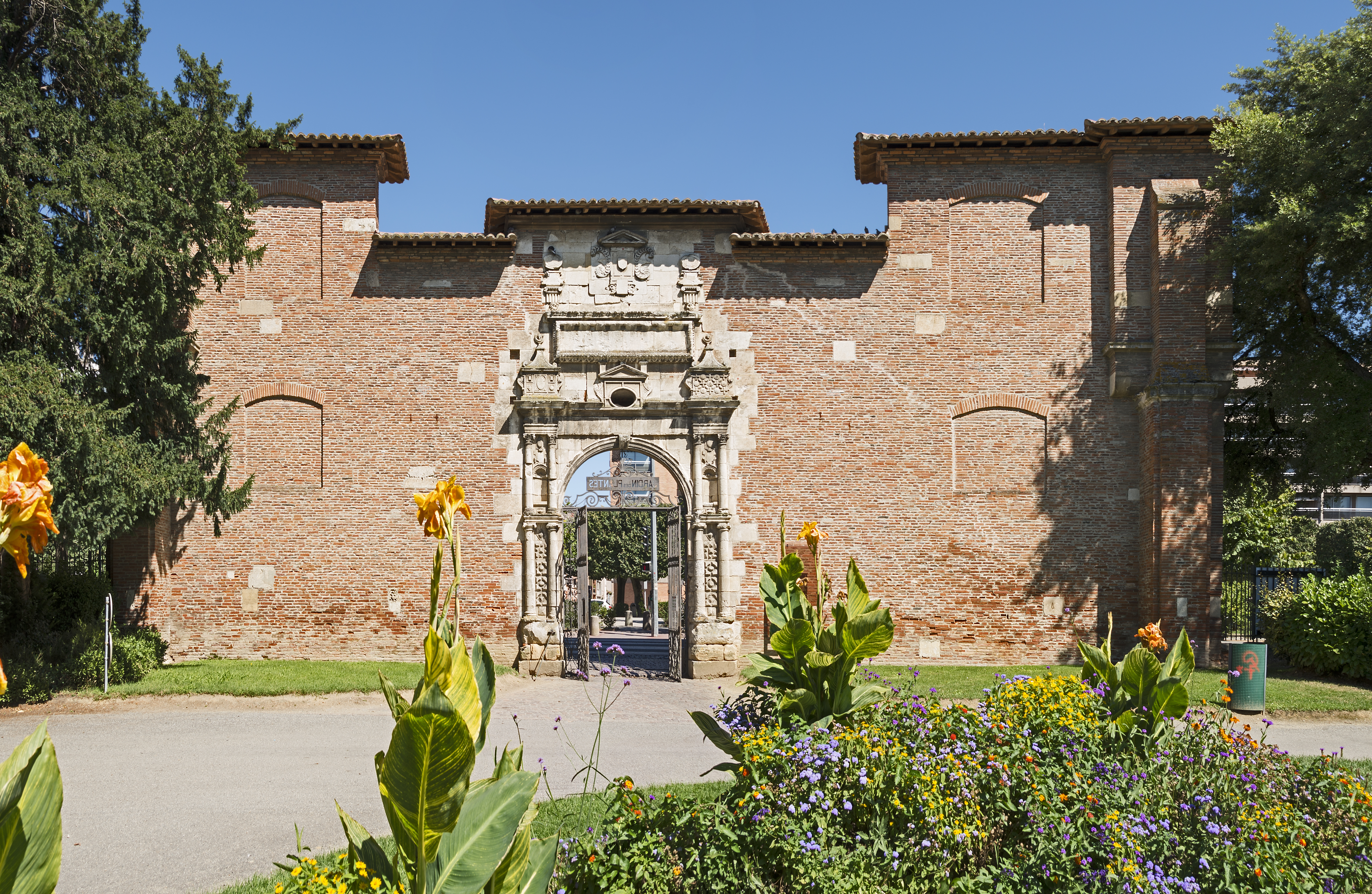
Renaissance portal in Jardin des plantes

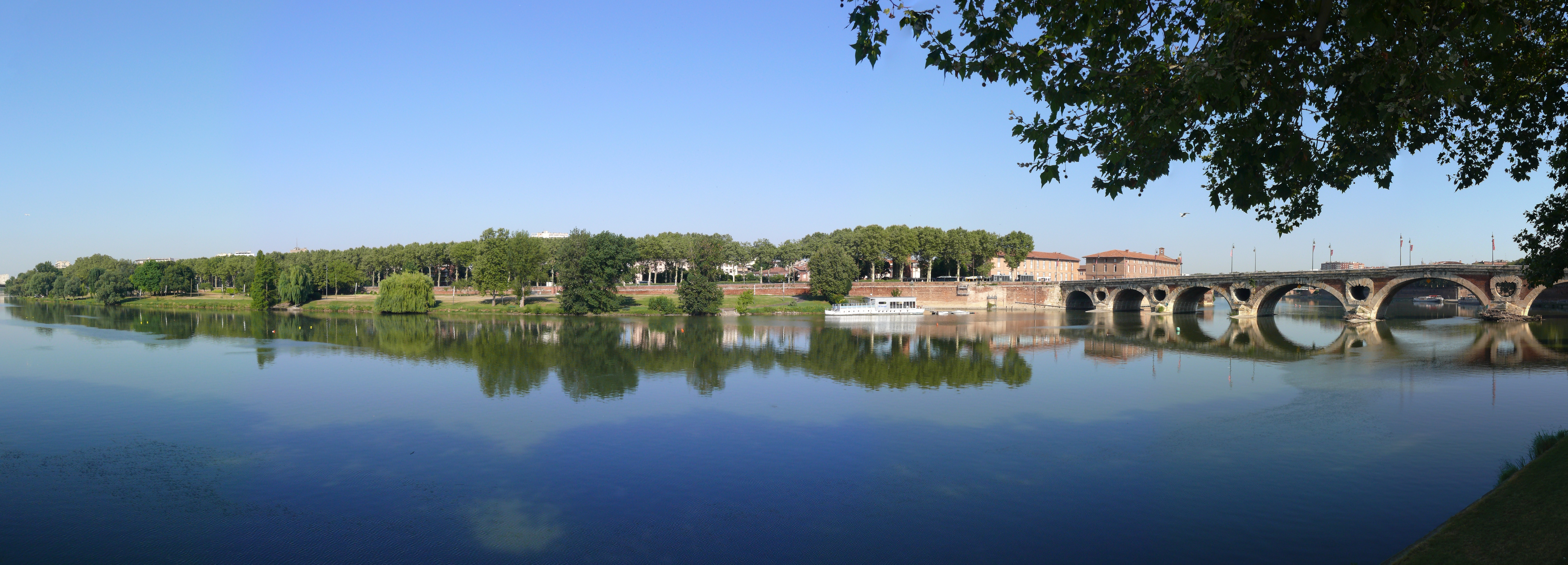
Prairie des Filtres park

=== Museums and theme parks ===
Toulouse has many museums, the most important of which are:

- Musée des Augustins is the fine arts museum of Toulouse, it is located in the former Augustinian convent.
- Bemberg Foundation, housed in the Hôtel d'Assézat, presents to the public one of the major private collections of art in Europe.
- Musée Saint-Raymond is the archeological museum of Toulouse, located in a former college of the university it presents the ancient history of Toulouse and a very rich collection of Roman sculptures from the imperial Roman villa of Chiragan.
- Musée Paul Dupuy is the museum of Decorative Arts and Graphic Arts, including a very rich collection of clocks and watches.
- Musée Georges Labit is dedicated to artifacts from the Far-Eastern and Ancient Egyptian civilizations.
- Muséum de Toulouse is one of the most important natural history museums in France, housed in the former convent of the Discalced Carmelites.
- Les Abattoirs is the museum of modern and contemporary art of the city, opened in a former municipal slaughterhouse.
Museums

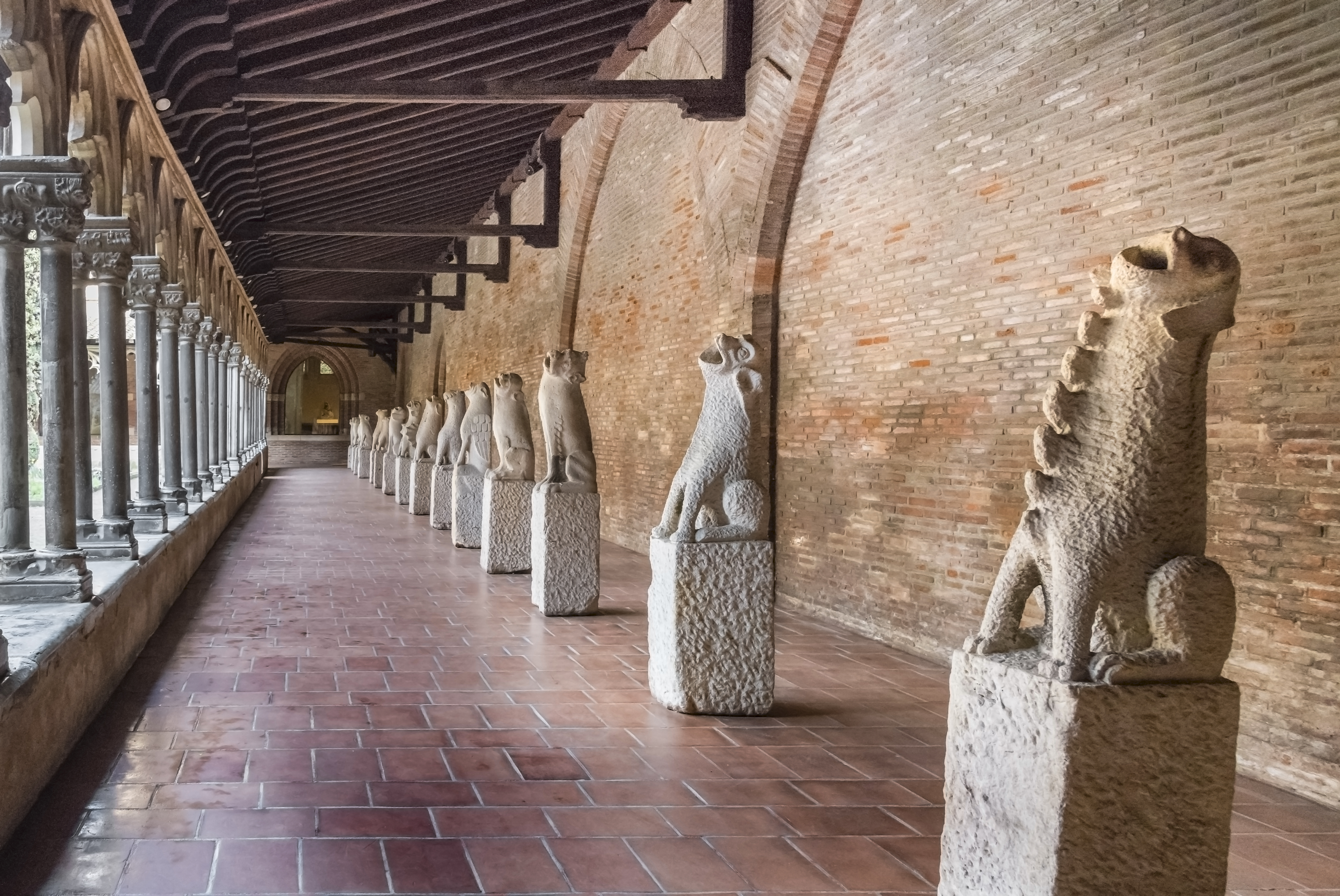
Musée des Augustins

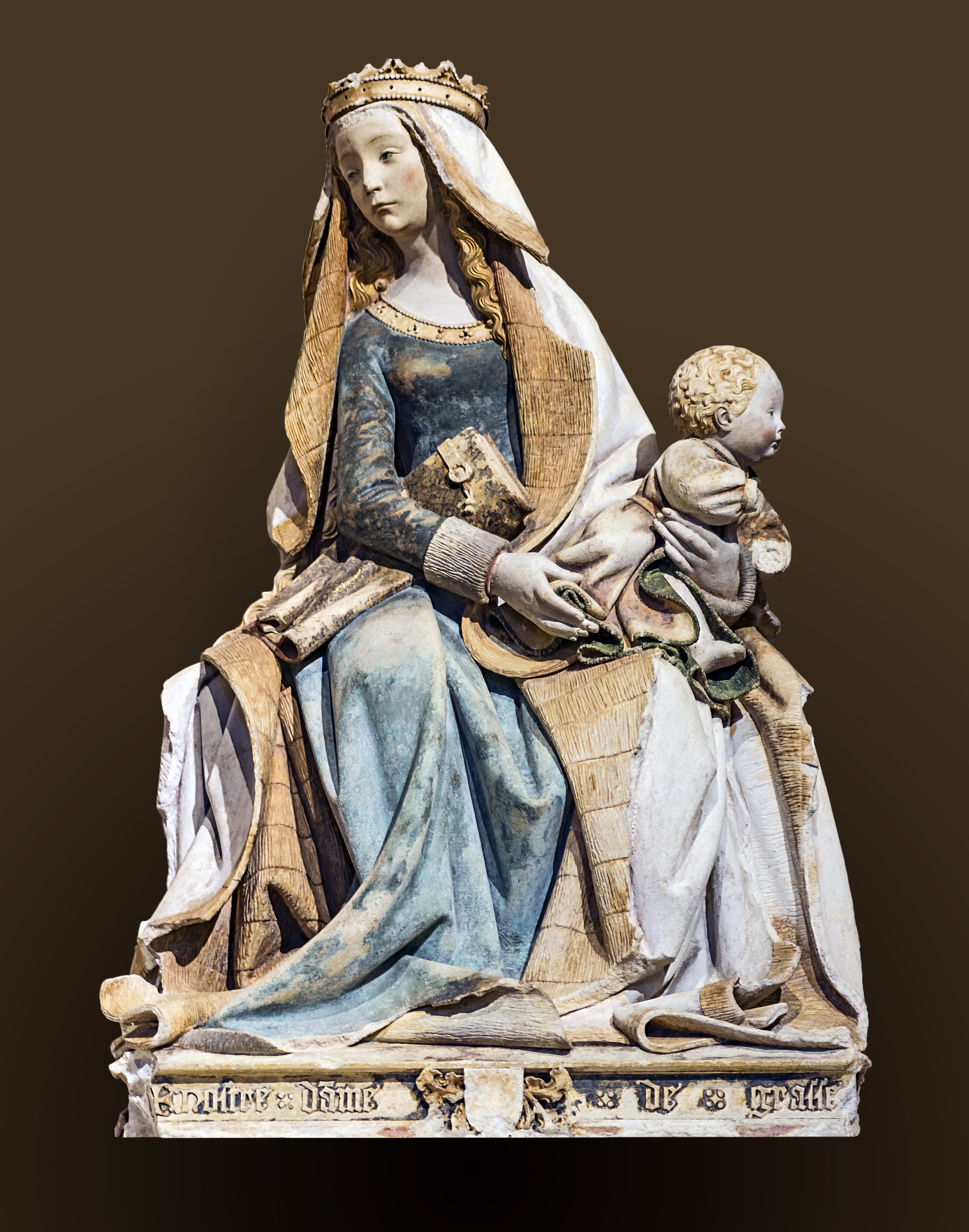
Nostre Dame de Grasse at Musée des Augustins

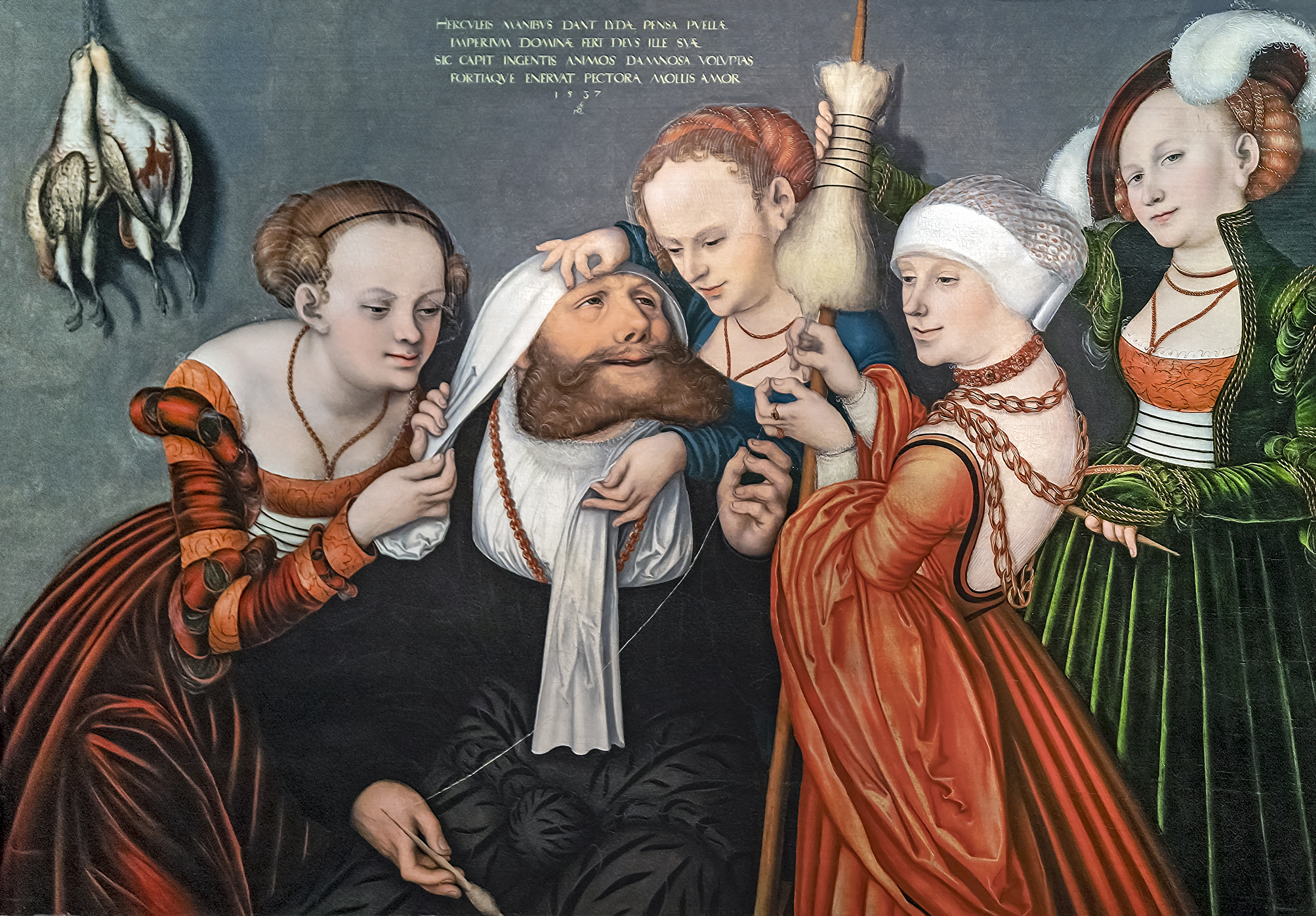
Painting of Lucas Cranach the Elder at Bemberg Foundation

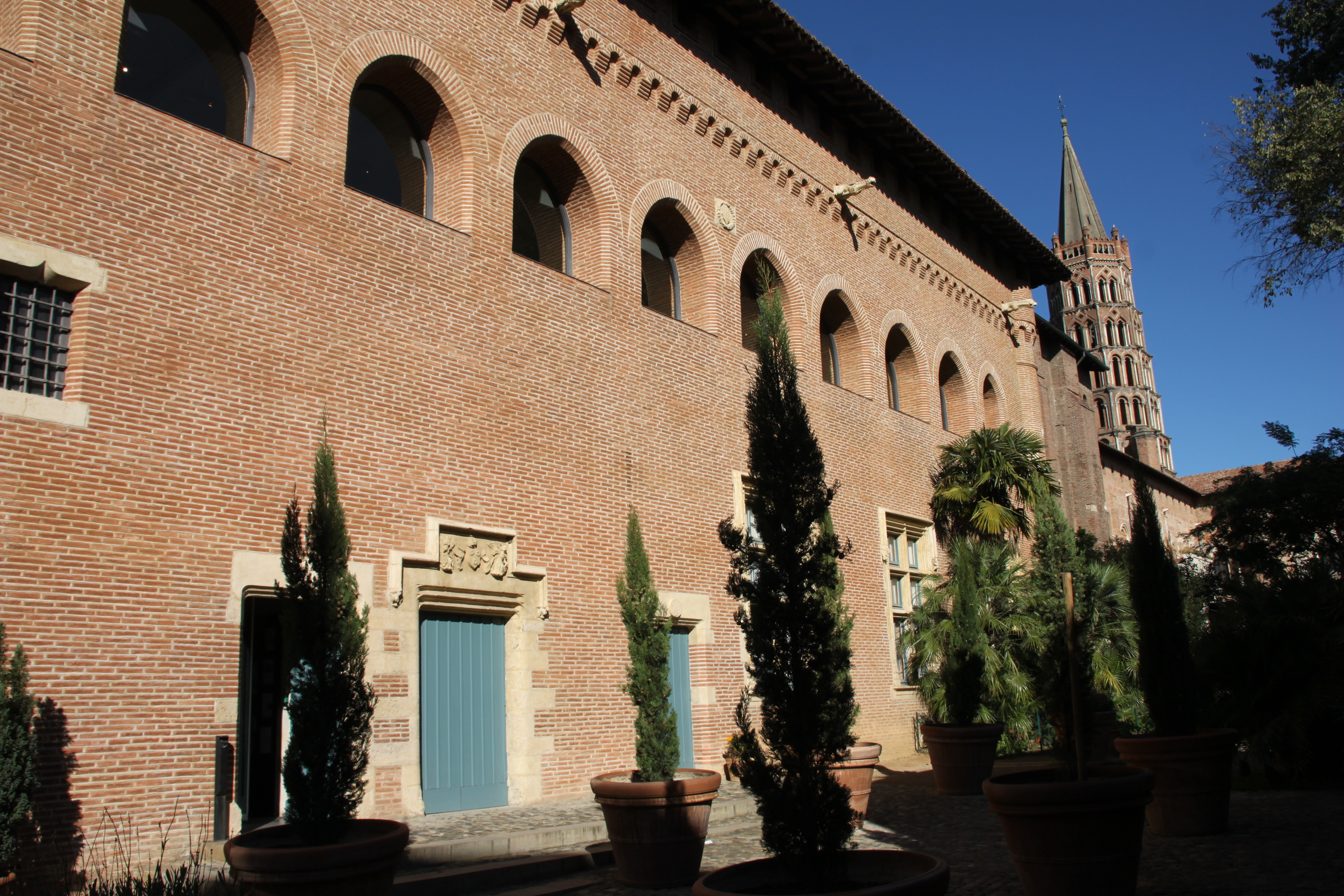
Musée Saint-Raymond

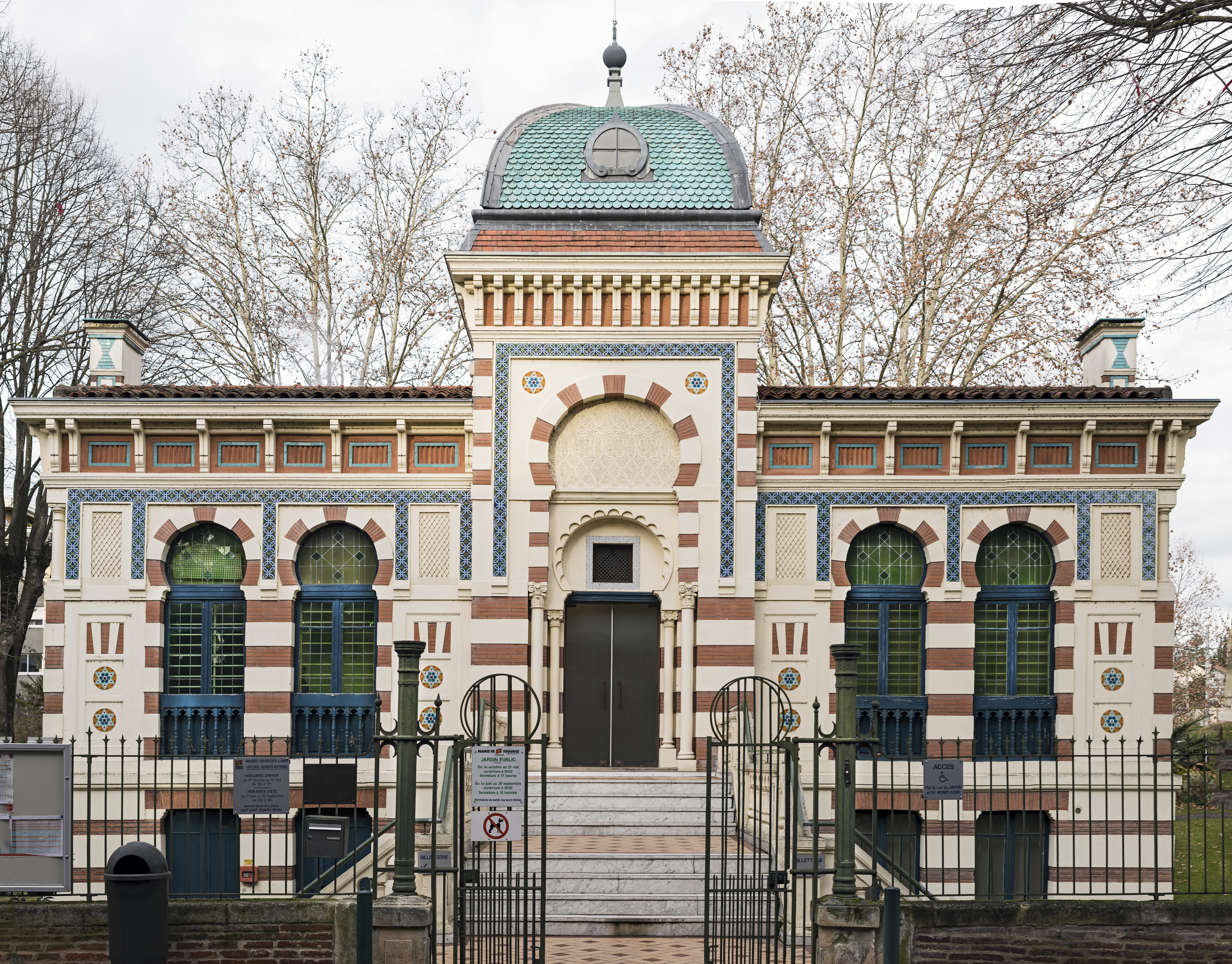
Georges Labit Museum

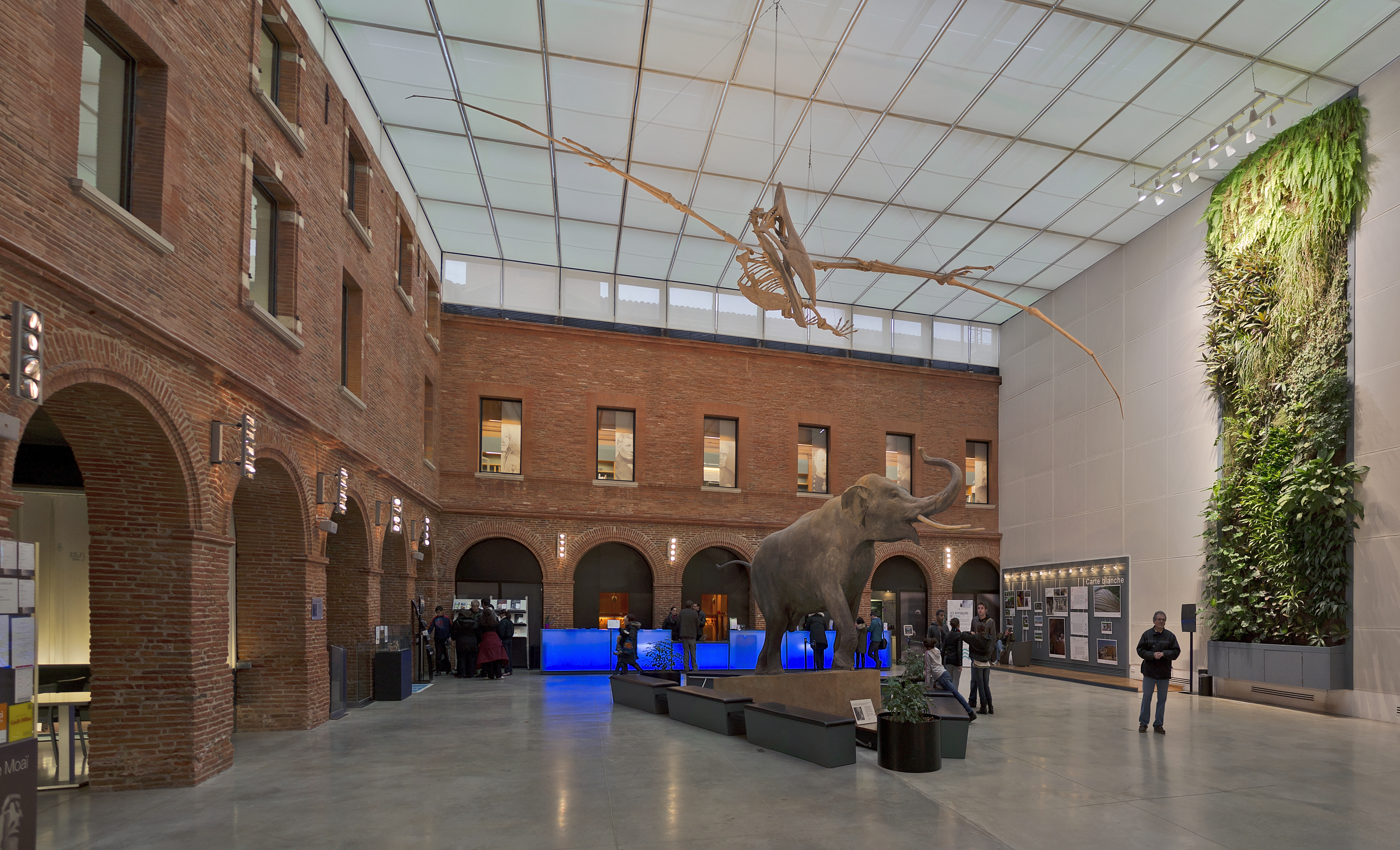
Muséum de Toulouse

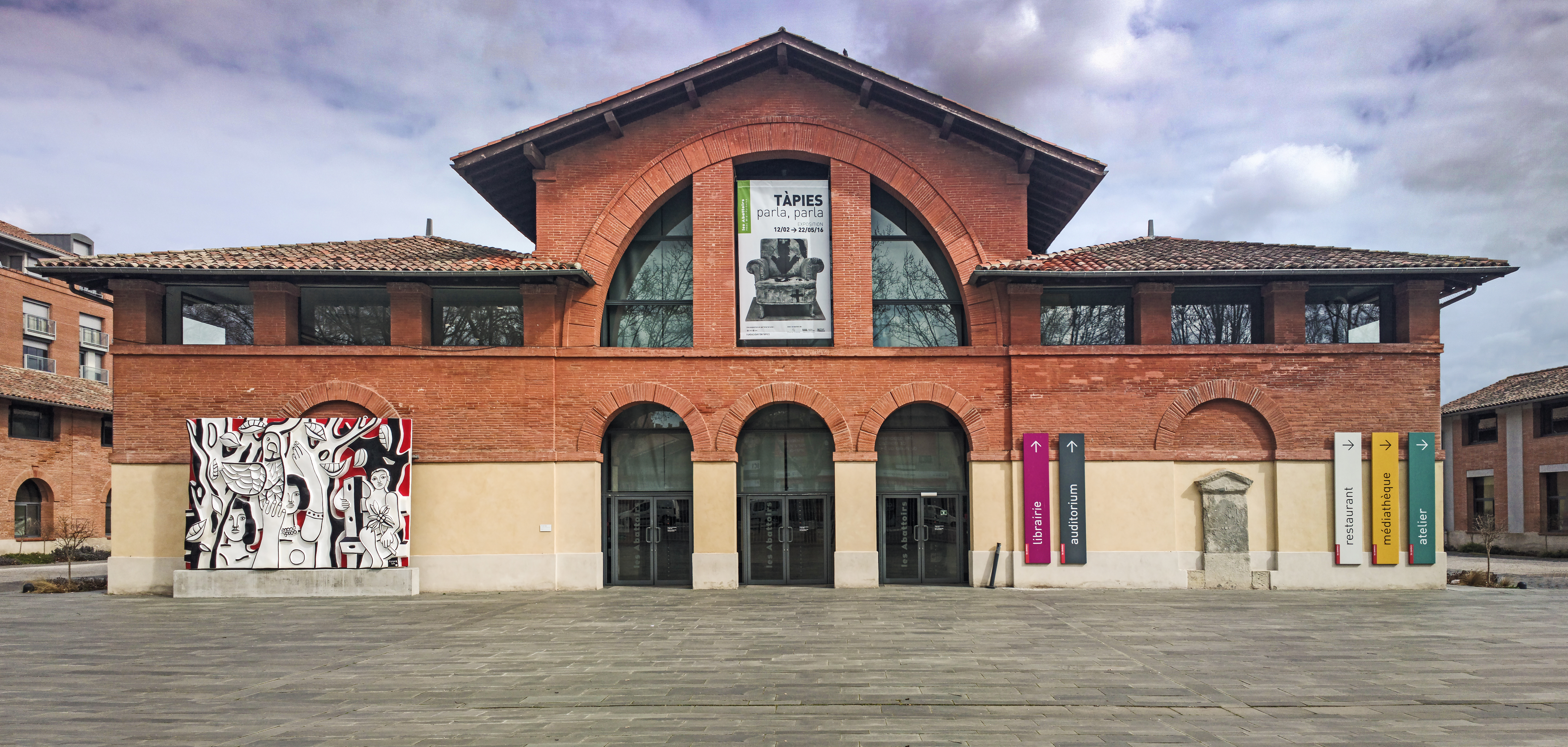
Les Abattoirs

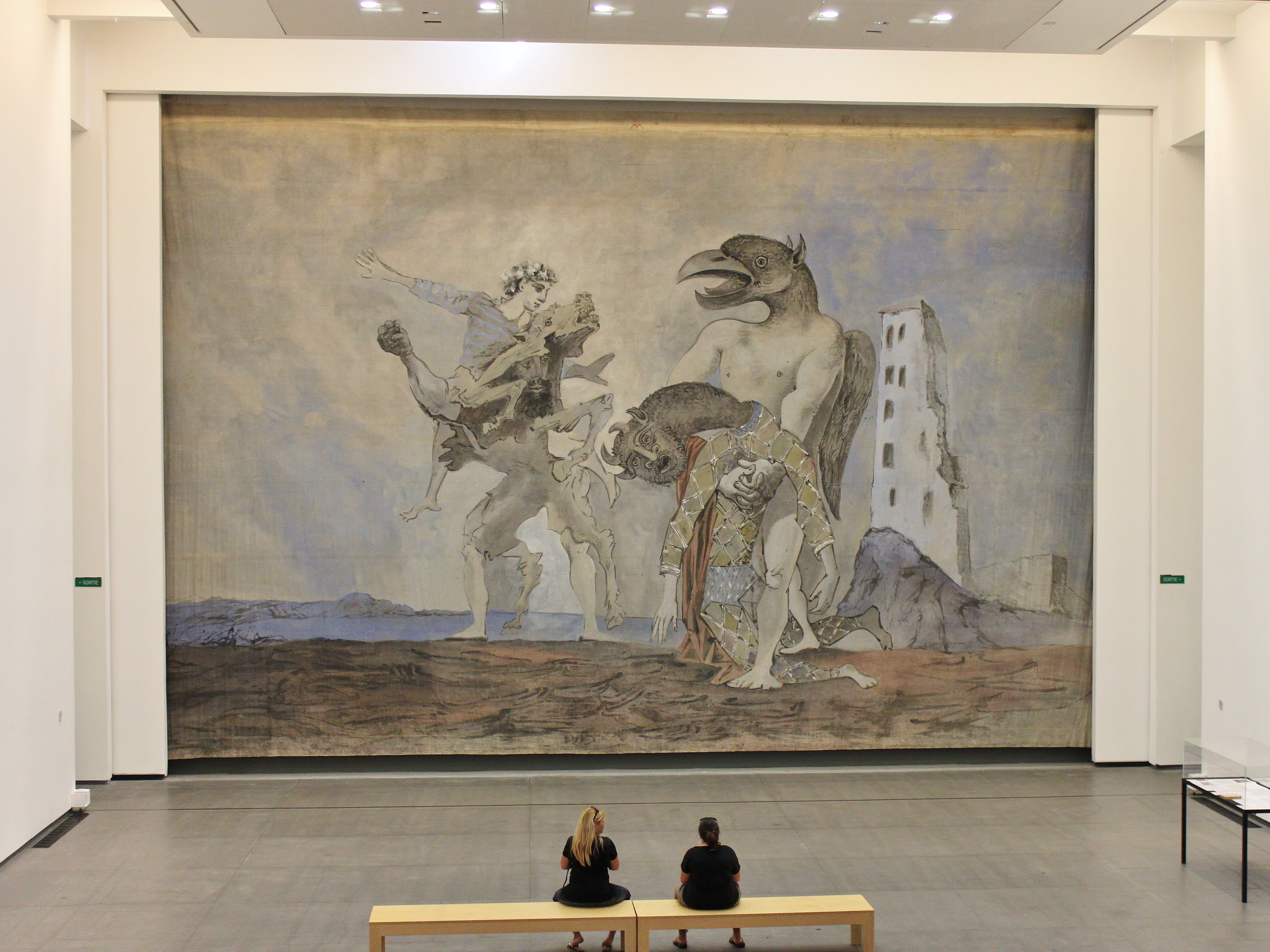
Picasso at Les Abattoirs

Toulouse also has several theme parks, notably highlighting its aeronautical and space heritage:

- Cité de l'espace is a scientific discovery centre focused on spaceflight.
- Aeroscopia is an aeronautical theme park located near Toulouse–Blagnac Airport, dedicated to the preservation of aeronautical historical heritage (it hosts for example two Concorde airliners).
- L'Envol des pionniers is a museum that traces the great adventure of l'Aéropostale, a pioneering airmail company based in Toulouse which operated between France, Africa and South America from 1918 to 1933, and employed legendary pilots such as Antoine de Saint-Exupéry, Jean Mermoz or Henri Guillaumet...
- Halle de La Machine is a vast hall that houses numerous small or giant animated machines, often inspired by the world of aeronautics, human or technological epics.
Theme parks

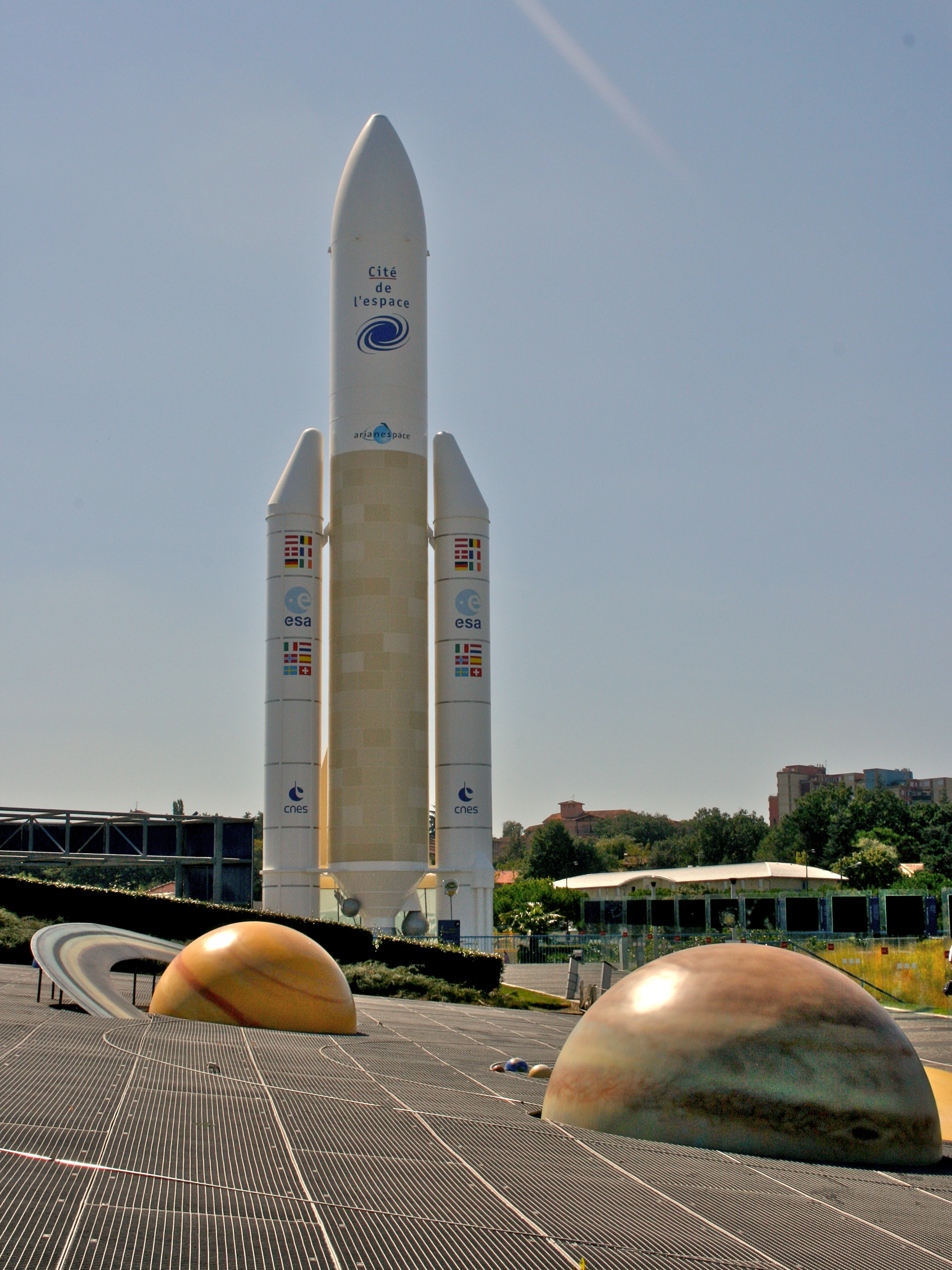
Cité de l'espace

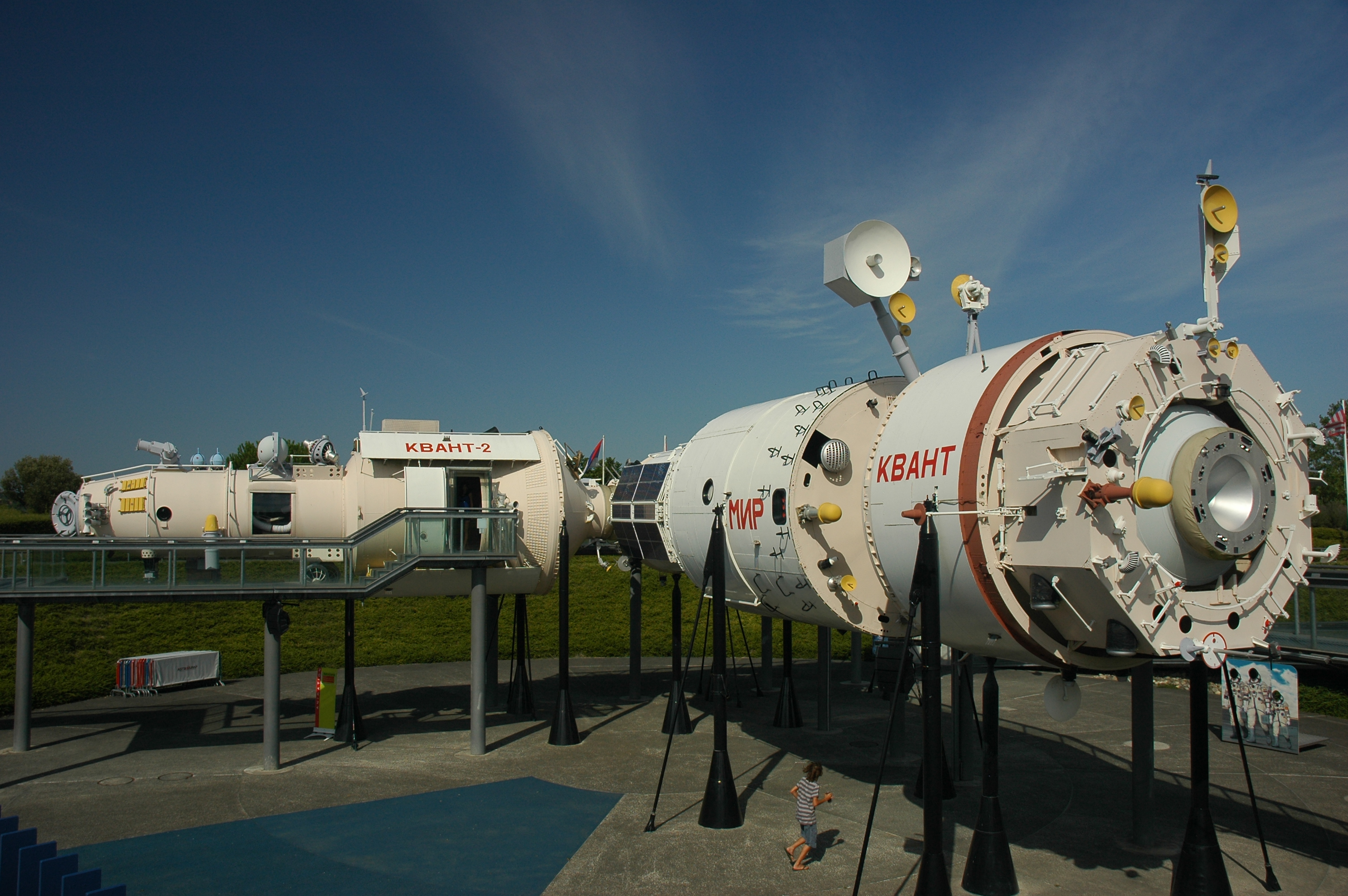
Cité de l'espace

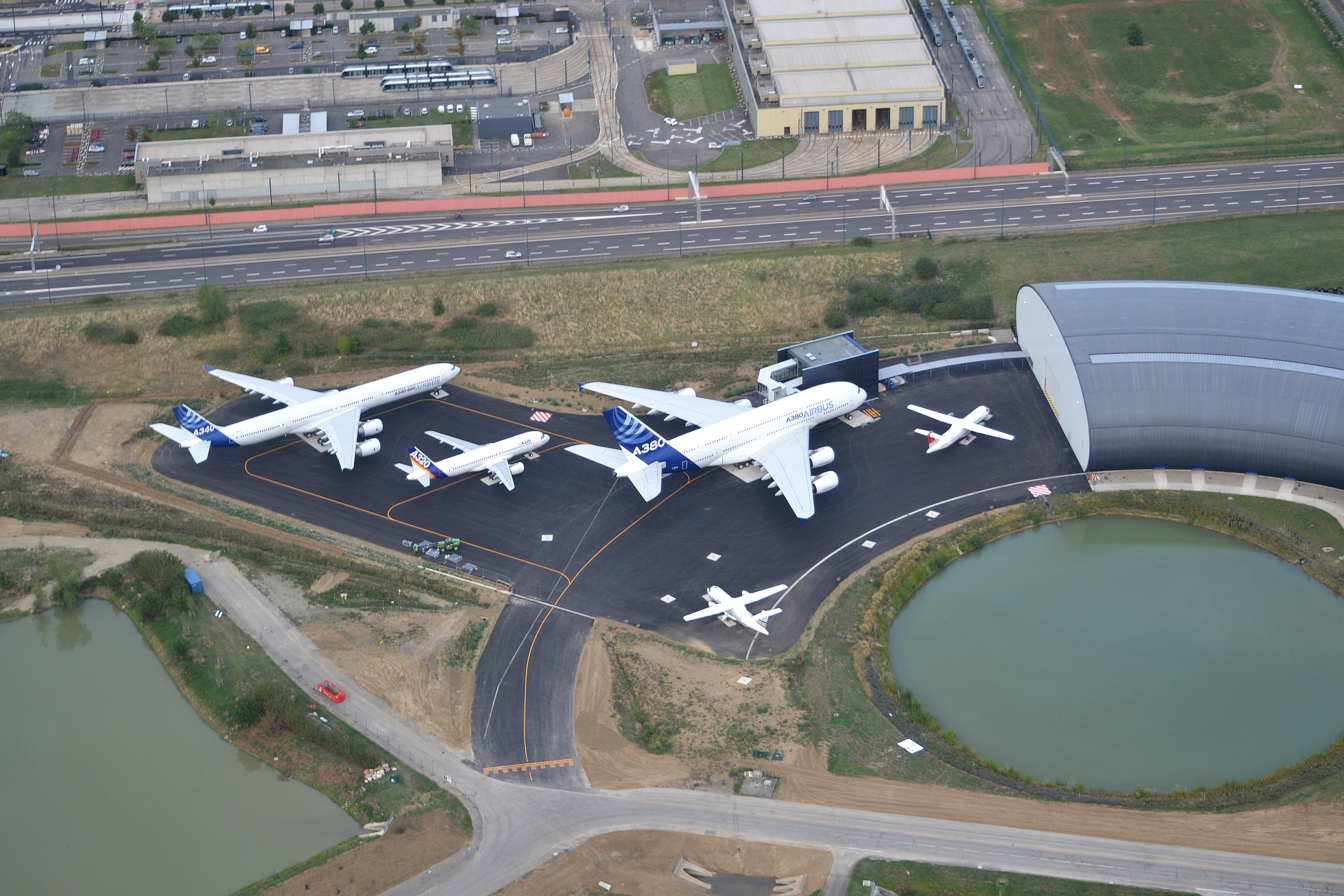
Aeroscopia

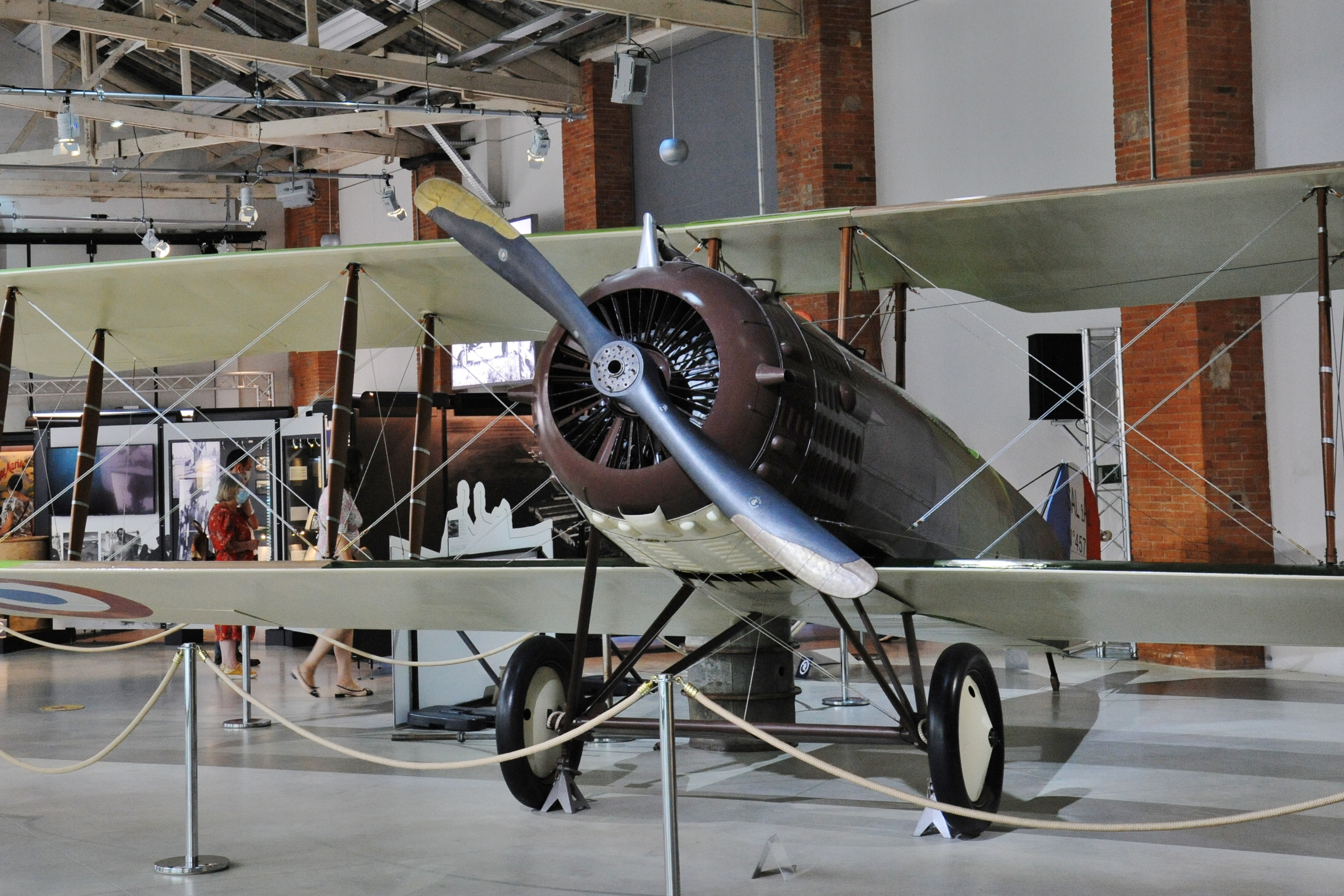
Replica Salmson 2 A.2 at L'Envol des pionniers

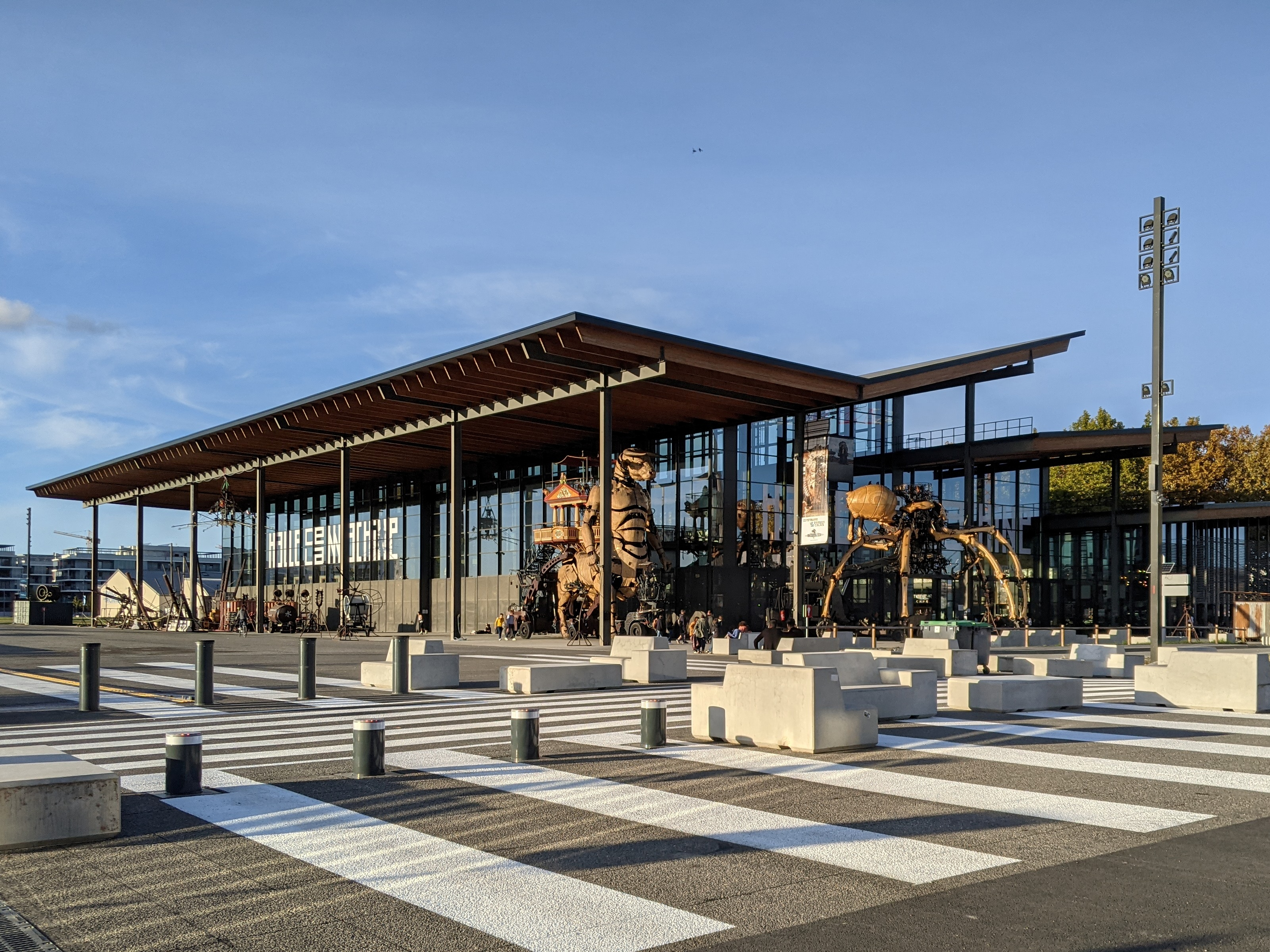
Halle de La Machine

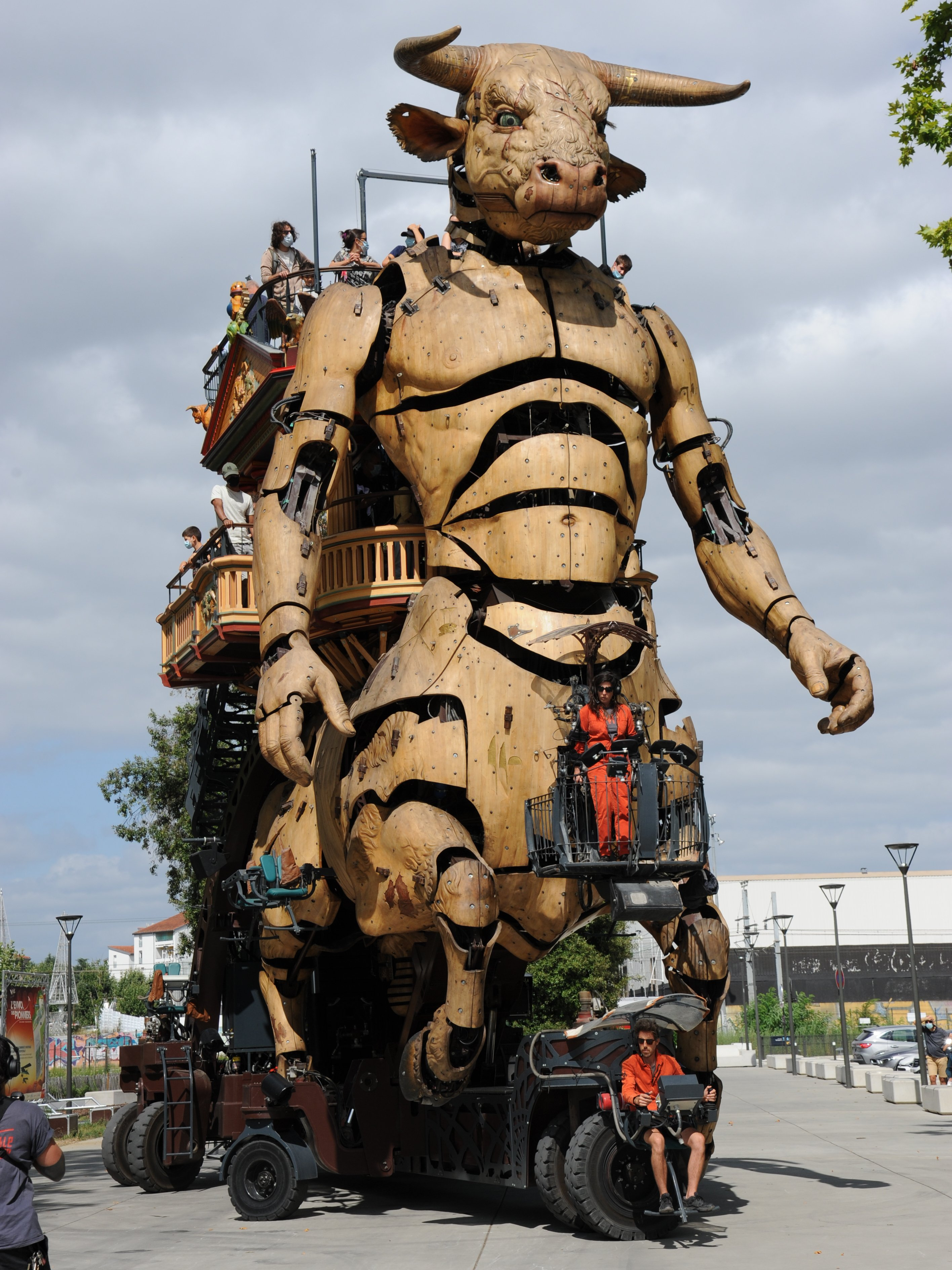
The giant Minotaur of the Halle de La Machine

== Economy ==
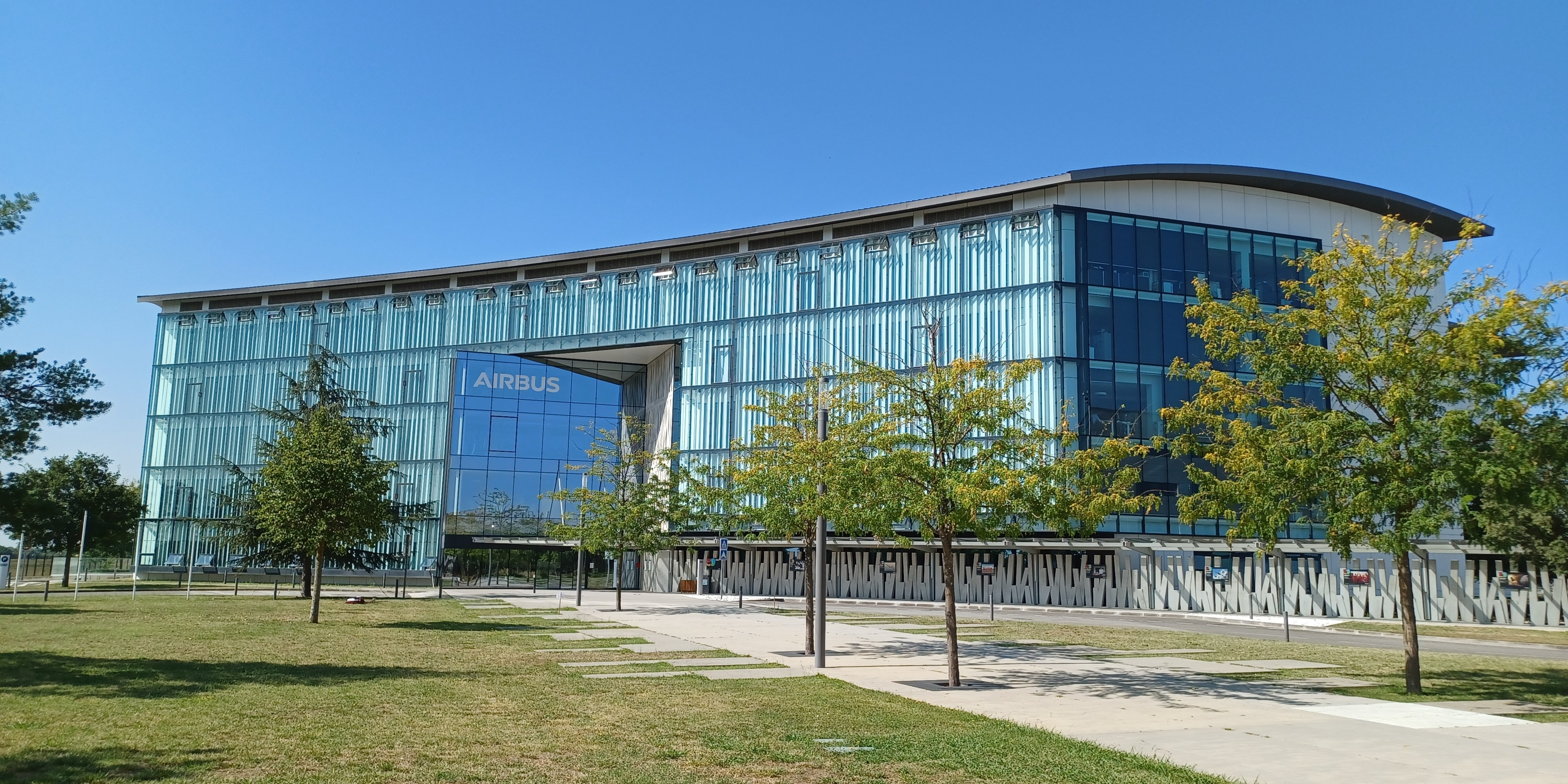
Global headquarters of Airbus at Toulouse-Blagnac Airport

The French Space Command Headquarters in Toulouse

Since 2003, Toulouse has been the French city with the fastest growing GDP per capita, a performance driven by growing high-tech industries.

Toulouse’s economy mainly relies on three sectors: large industrial companies, research laboratories (with a large cohort of university students), engineers and scientists. Indeed, Toulouse is home to the second largest research and education centre in France. It has high-ranking educational institutions, as well as major global industries such as Airbus and Thales Alenia for aeronautics and space. This ecosystem fosters innovation in fields such as artificial intelligence, IOT, robotics, avionics, embedded systems, biotechnology, and health.

Toulouse can particularly be described as the 'capital' of the European aerospace industry: it hosts the Airbus headquarters and assembly-lines of Airbus A320, A330, and A350. The A380 was also produced here (the last completed in 2021), as was the Concorde supersonic aircraft. Toulouse also hosts the headquarters of ATR, one of the two headquarters of Liebherr Aerospace and Groupe Latécoère. As for the space industry, with 12,000 jobs, 400 companies and 25% of the European workforce, Toulouse is the main European hub.

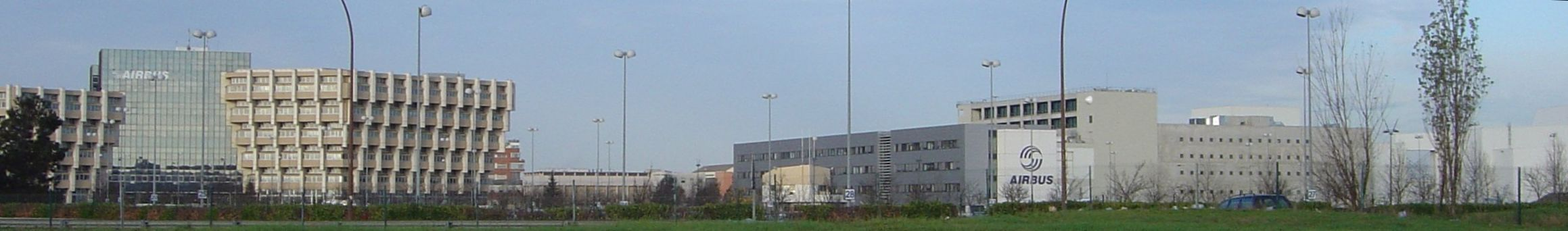
The main Airbus factory in Blagnac, near Toulouse, lies next to Toulouse Airport

== Education ==
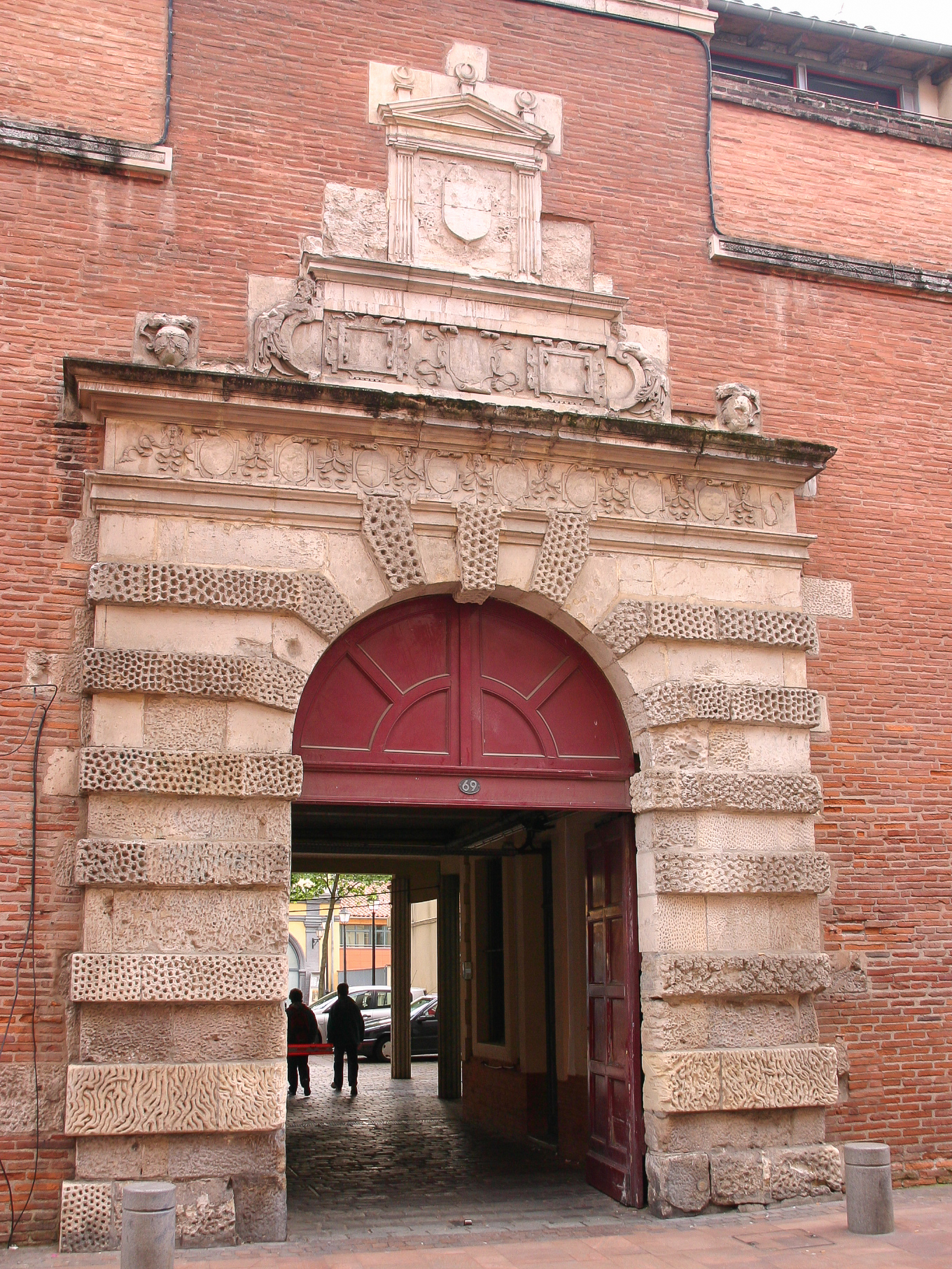
Portal of the college de l'Esquile (1556), a symbol of the university's seniority

Toulouse has the fourth-largest student population in France after Paris, Lyon and Lille with 103,000 students (2012).

=== Colleges and universities ===
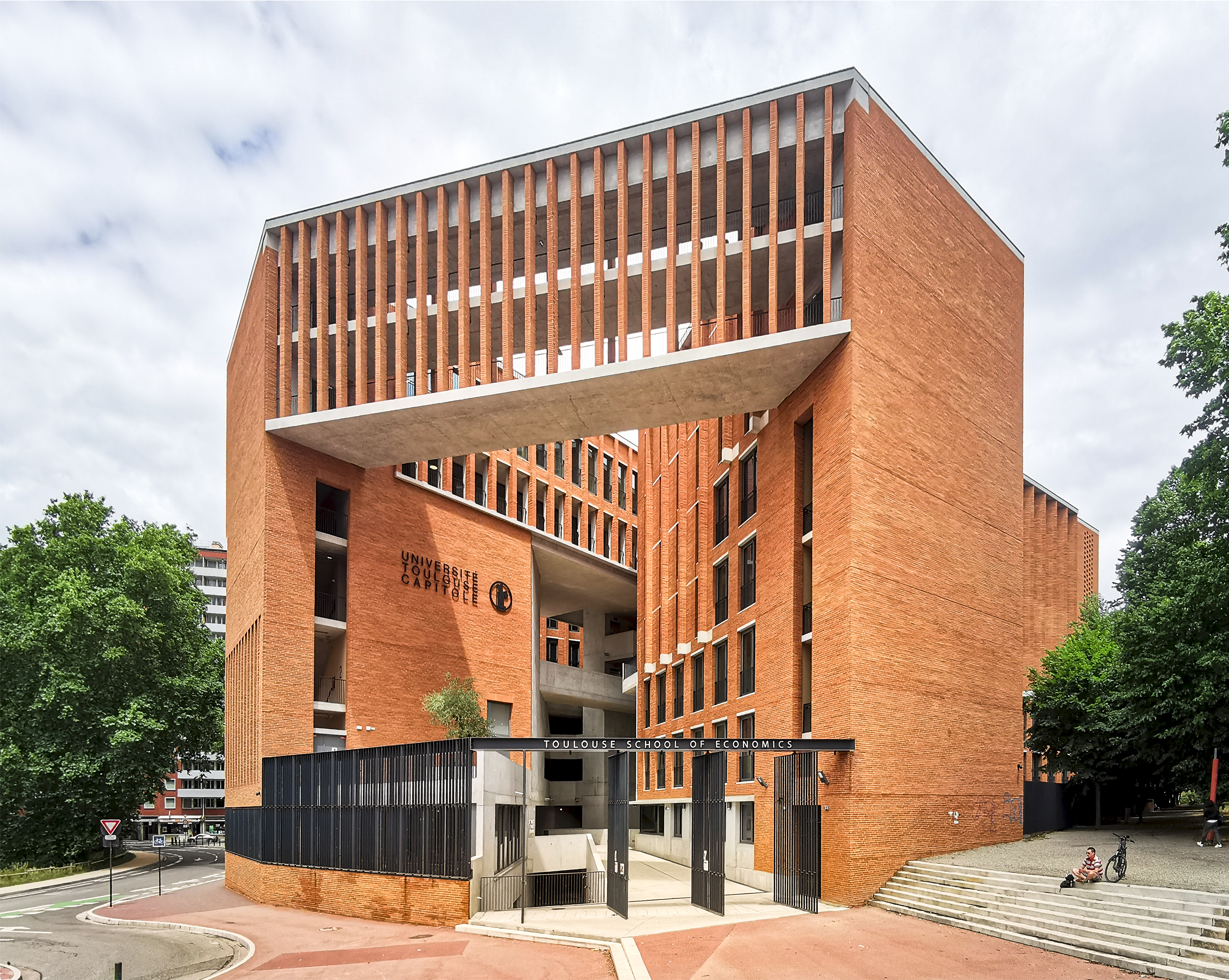
New building of Toulouse School of Economics

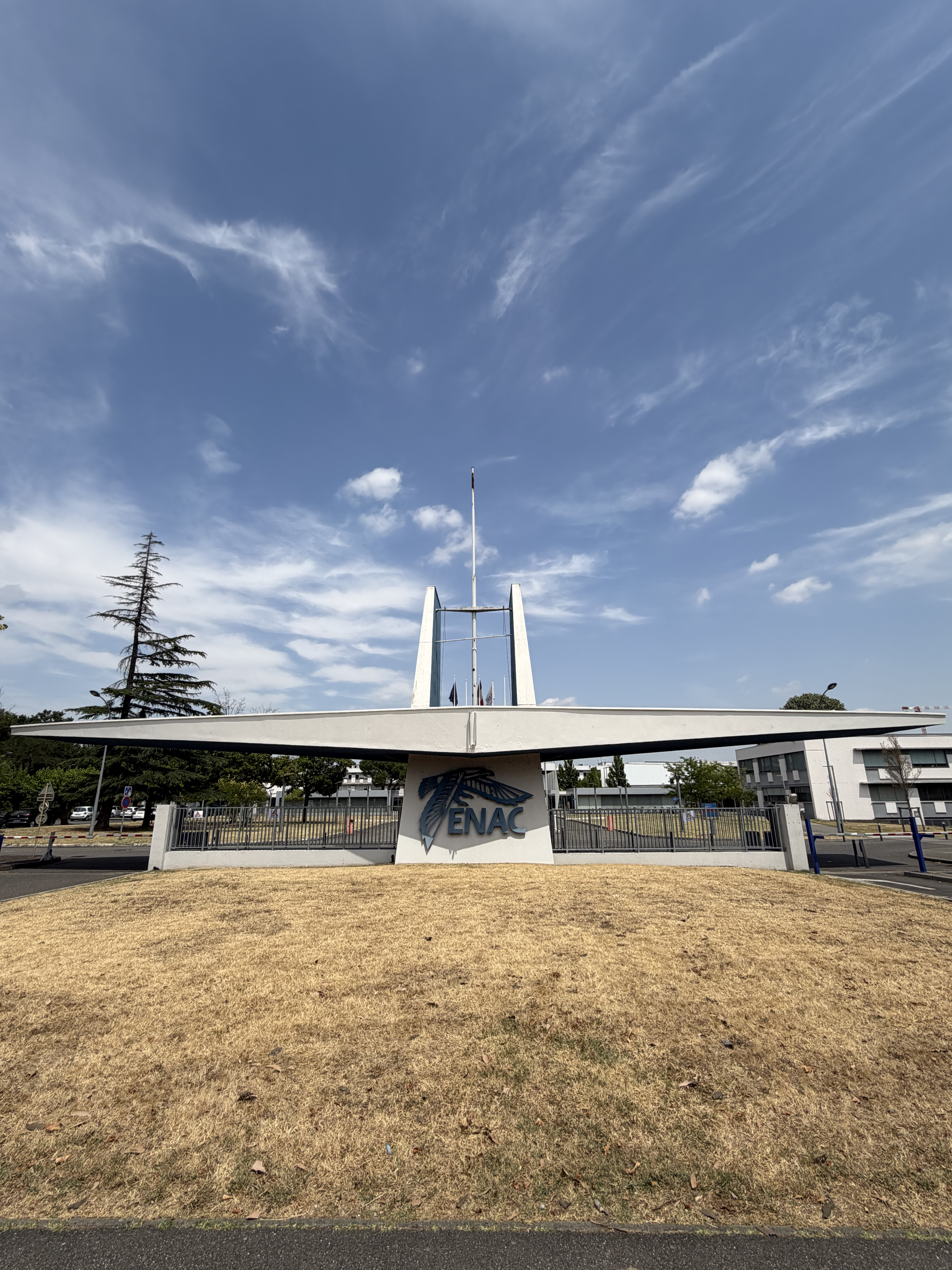
ENAC entrance

The University of Toulouse (Université de Toulouse) was established in 1229 (now split into three separate universities). Like the universities in Oxford and Paris, the University of Toulouse was established at a time when Europeans were starting to translate the writings of Arabs of Andalus and Greek philosophers. These writings challenged European ideology—inspiring scientific discoveries and advances in the arts—as society began seeing itself in a new way. These colleges were supported by the Church, in hopes of reconciling Greek philosophy and Christian theology.

- Catholic University of Toulouse
- Université Toulouse I, Toulouse School of Economics, Toulouse School of Management and Institut d'études politiques de Toulouse
- University of Toulouse-Jean Jaurès (Formerly University of Toulouse II – Le Mirail)
- Université Paul Sabatier (Toulouse III)

Toulouse is also the home of Toulouse Business School (TBS), Toulouse School of Economics (TSE), the Institut supérieur européen de gestion group (ISEG Group), the Institut supérieur européen de formation par l'action (ISEFAC), E-Artsup and several engineering schools:

- ICAM Toulouse (Institut catholique d'arts et métiers)
- INSA Toulouse
- ISAE SUPAERO (Institut supérieur de l'aéronautique et de l'espace)
- ENAC (École Nationale de l'Aviation Civile)
- INP ENSEEIHT (École Nationale Supérieure d'Électronique, d'Électrotechnique, d'Informatique, d'Hydraulique et des Télécommunications)
- ENSFEA (École nationale supérieure de formation de l'enseignement agricole)
- INP ENSIACET (École nationale supérieure d'ingénieurs en art chimique et technologique)
- INP ENSAT (École Nationale Supérieure Agronomique de Toulouse)
- INP ENM (École Nationale de la Météorologie)
- EPITA (École pour l'informatique et les techniques avancées)
- EPITECH (École pour l'informatique et les nouvelles technologies or European Institute of Information Technology)
- IPSA (Institut Polytechnique des Sciences Avancées)
- EIPurpan (École d'ingénieurs de Purpan)
- UPSSITECH (Université Paul Sabatier, sciences, ingénierie et technologie)

=== Primary and secondary schools ===
The most well known high schools in Toulouse are Lycée Pierre-de-Fermat and Lycée Saint-Sernin.

International schools serving area expatriates are in nearby Colomiers:

- International School of Toulouse
- Deutsche Schule Toulouse (German school)

== Transport ==
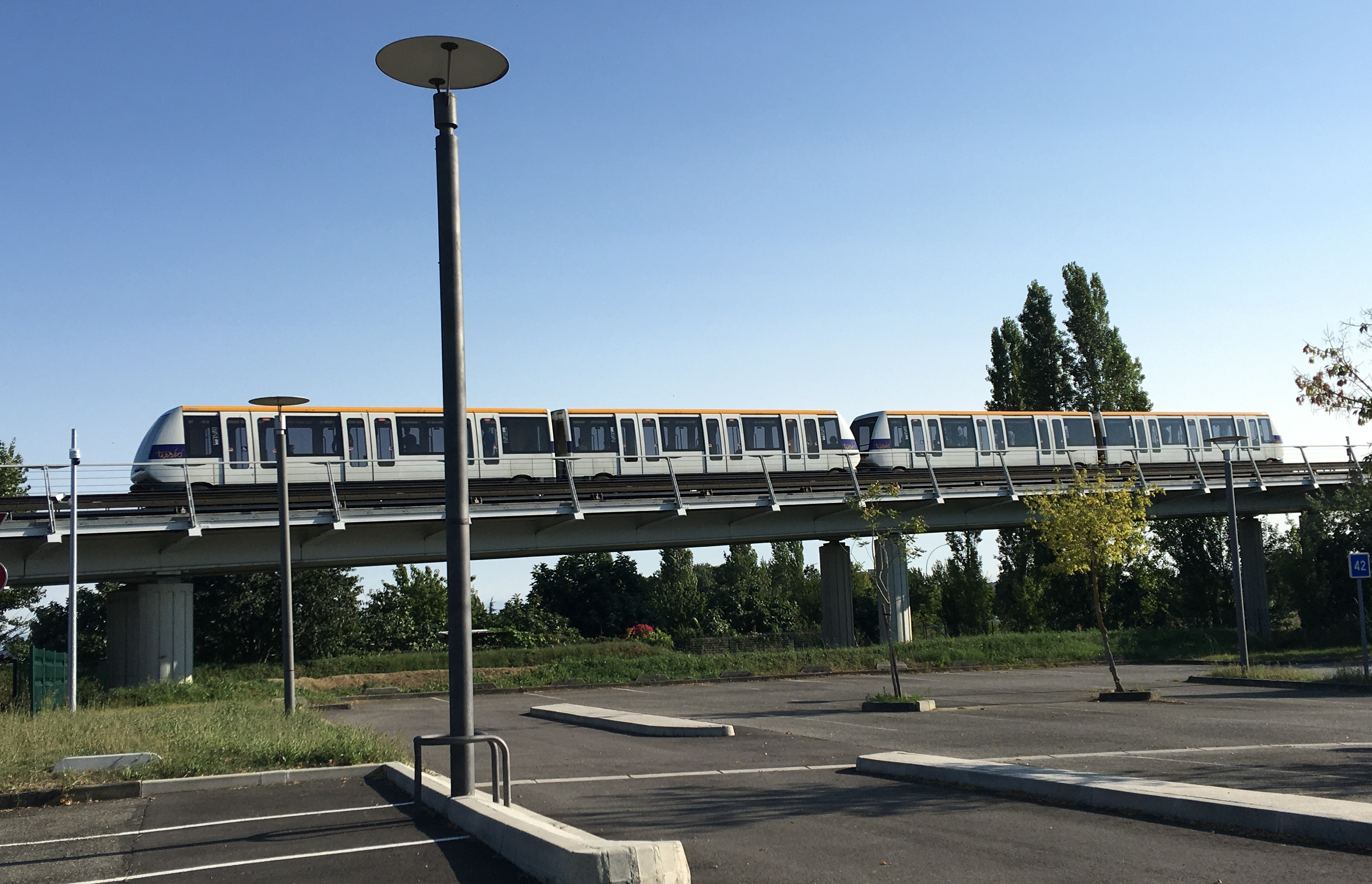
Line A of the Toulouse Metro

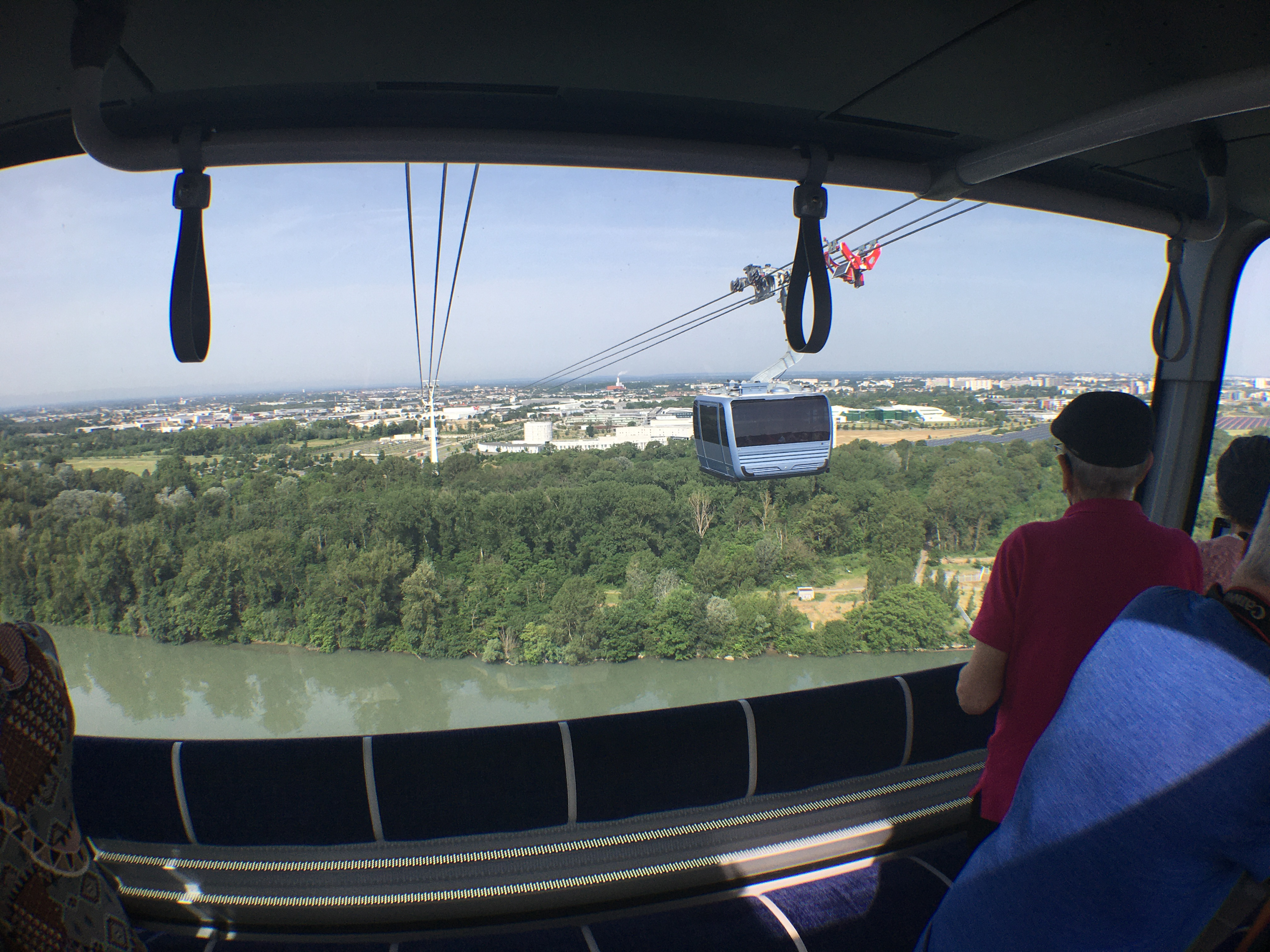
Téléo, the cable car of Toulouse

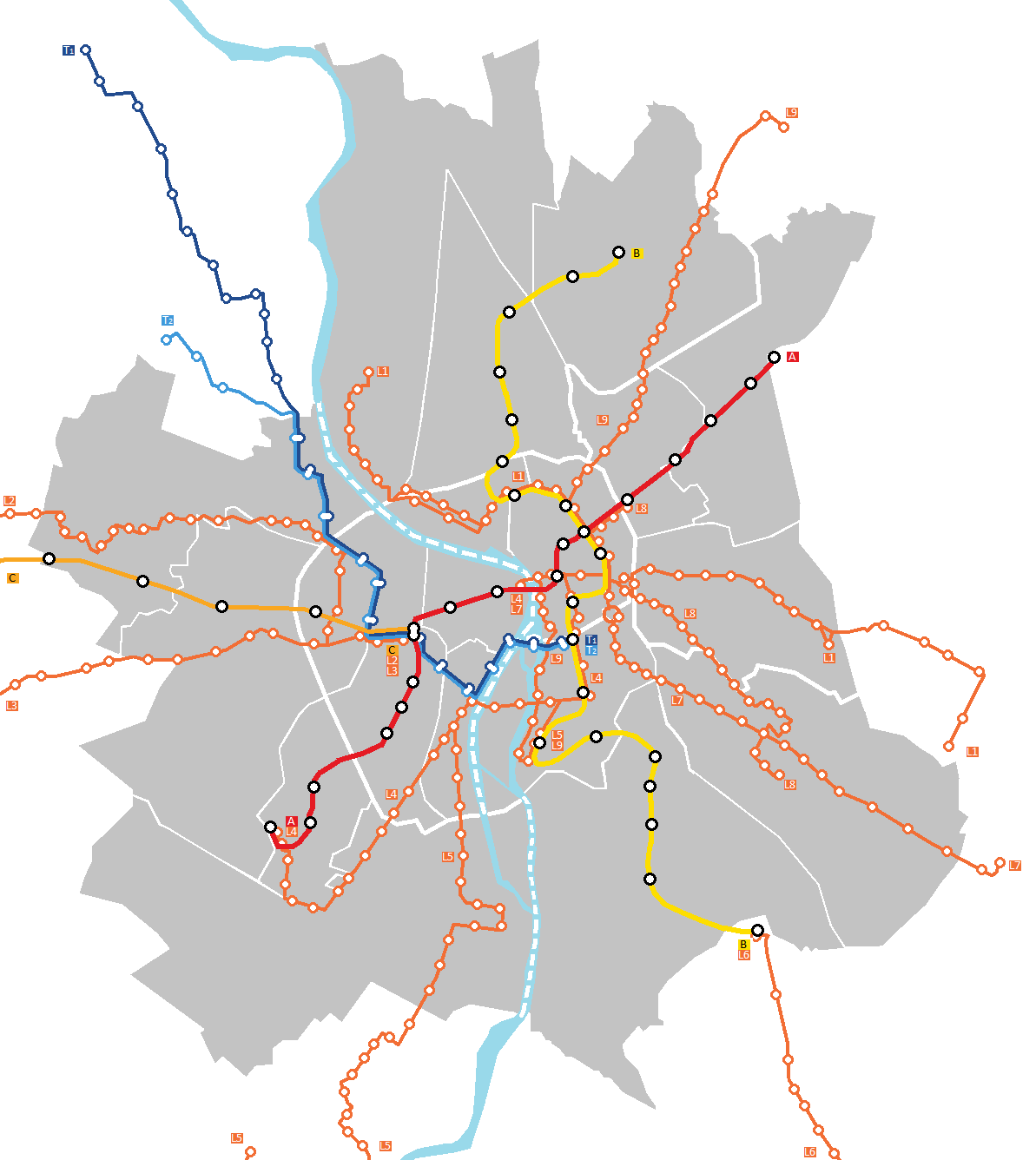
Toulouse public transport map that shows metro lines, tram lines and the high-level bus network called Lineo

=== Train ===
The main railway station, with regional and national services, is Toulouse-Matabiau station. In addition, there are several smaller stations in the city: Toulouse-Saint-Agne, Gallieni-Cancéropôle, Toulouse-Saint-Cyprien-Arènes, Le TOEC, Lardenne, Saint-Martin-du-Touch, Les Ramassiers, Montaudran and Lacourtensourt. The stations of Lalande-L'Église and Route-de-Launaguet were served until 2016.

=== Metro ===
All urban bus, metro and tram services are operated by Tisséo. In addition to an extensive bus system (145 lines), the Toulouse Metro is a VAL (Véhicule Automatique Léger) metro system made up of driverless (automatic) rubber-tyred trains:

- Line A runs for 12.5 km (7.8 mi) from Balma-Gramont in the north-east to Basso Cambo in the south-west.
- Line B, which opened in June 2007, serves 20 stations north to south and intersects line A at Jean Jaurès.

Line C is under construction for an opening in 2028 with 21 stations over 27 km. It will cross line B at 2 stations (La Vache and François Verdier) and will cross line A at Matabiau Gares (central train station).

Actual Line C has existed since line A was completed. It is not VAL but an urban railway line operated by SNCF. It connects to line A at Arènes. Two other stations located in Toulouse are also served by line C. Lardenne, formerly named "Gare des Capelles", changed its name in September 2003 when line C opened. Le TOEC station opened on 1 September 2003 with the creation of line C, allowing an urban train service in Toulouse and close western suburbs. Since 2023, the service is now named Arènes-Colomiers train line to leave the name for the new metro line.

Similarly, Line D runs south from Toulouse Matabiau to Muret.

=== Tramway ===
The Toulouse conurbation has two tram lines:

- The tramway line T1, with 25 stations and 14.8 km long, has been in service since December 2010. It links Toulouse to the new MEETT Exhibition and Convention Centre in Beauzelle, via Blagnac.
- The tramway line T2, which connects Toulouse-Blagnac airport, is a branch of the first line. It is currently stopped to transform it into an airport express tram which will be connected to metro line C in 2028.

=== Cable car ===
Since 13 May 2022, the city of Toulouse has had a new mode of public transportation called Téléo. This is a cable car that links Paul-Sabatier University to Rangueil Hospital and the Oncopole (a major cancer research centre). It allows to fly over the Garonne and the hill of Pech David and, with its 3 kilometres, it is the longest urban cable car in France. It is presented as the first link in a public transport belt that is not radial and oriented towards the city centre, but designed to encircle the south of Toulouse.

=== Bicycle ===
In 2007, a citywide bicycle rental scheme called VélôToulouse was introduced, with bicycles available from automated stations for a daily, weekly, monthly or yearly subscription.

=== Airports ===
Airports include:

- Toulouse Blagnac: the principal local airport
- Toulouse Francazal: former principal airport, then former military airfield, its activity is nowadays reduced
- Toulouse Lasbordes: this airfield is dedicated to leisure aviation and flying clubs

=== Canal ===
The Canal du Midi begins in Toulouse and runs up to Sète.

=== Toulouse public transportation statistics ===
The average amount of time people spend commuting with public transit in Toulouse on a weekday is 44 minutes. 9.1% of public transit riders ride for more than 2 hours every day. The average amount of time people wait at a stop or station for public transit is 9 minutes, while 10.4% of riders wait for over 20 minutes on average every day. The average distance people usually ride in a single trip with public transit is 7 kilometres (4.3 mi), while 8% travel for over 12 kilometres (7.5 mi) in a single direction.

== Communications ==
Toulouse is the home of Bonhoure Radio Tower, a 61-metre-tall (200 ft) lattice tower used for FM and TV transmission. In 2001 a 100-kilometre (62 mi) optical fiber (symmetric 360 Gbit/s) network named Infrastructure Métropolitaine de Télécommunications was deployed around the city and suburbs.

== Culture ==
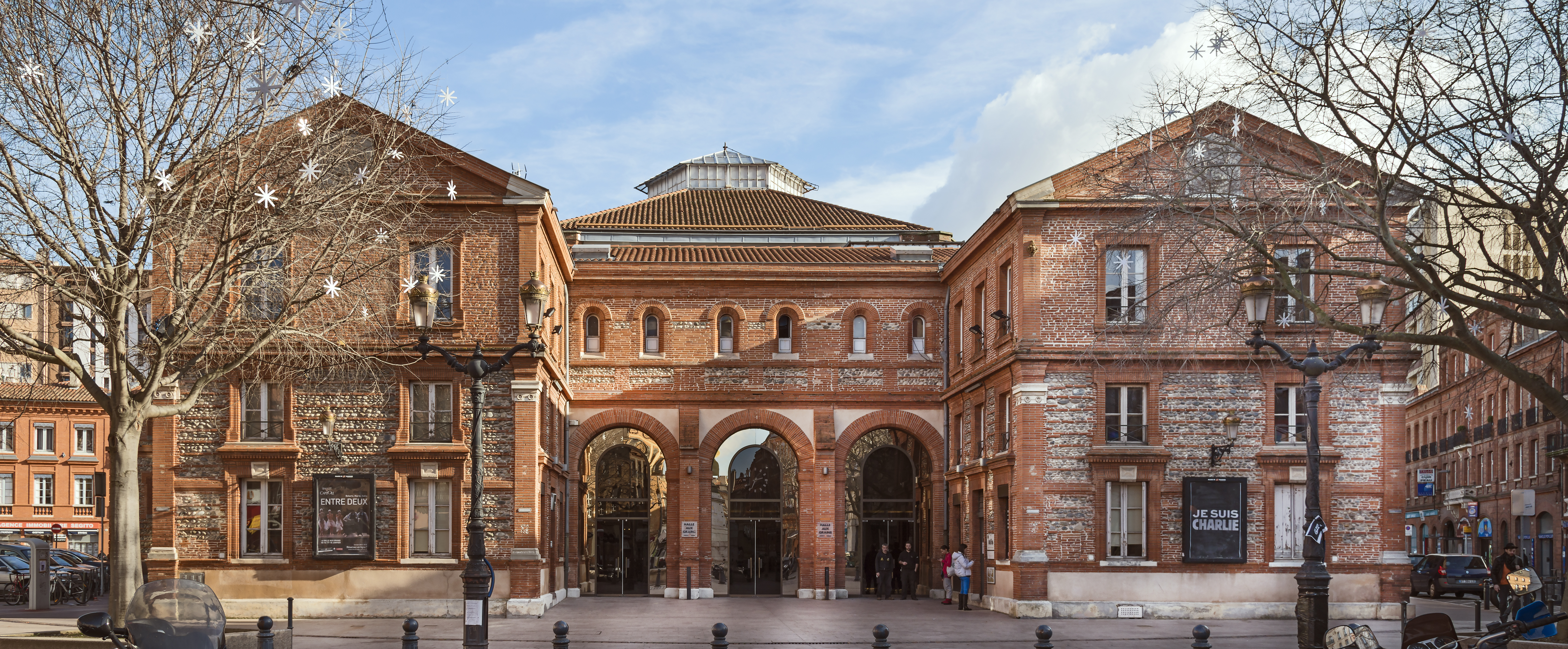
The Halle aux grains, a former grain market now used as a concert hall

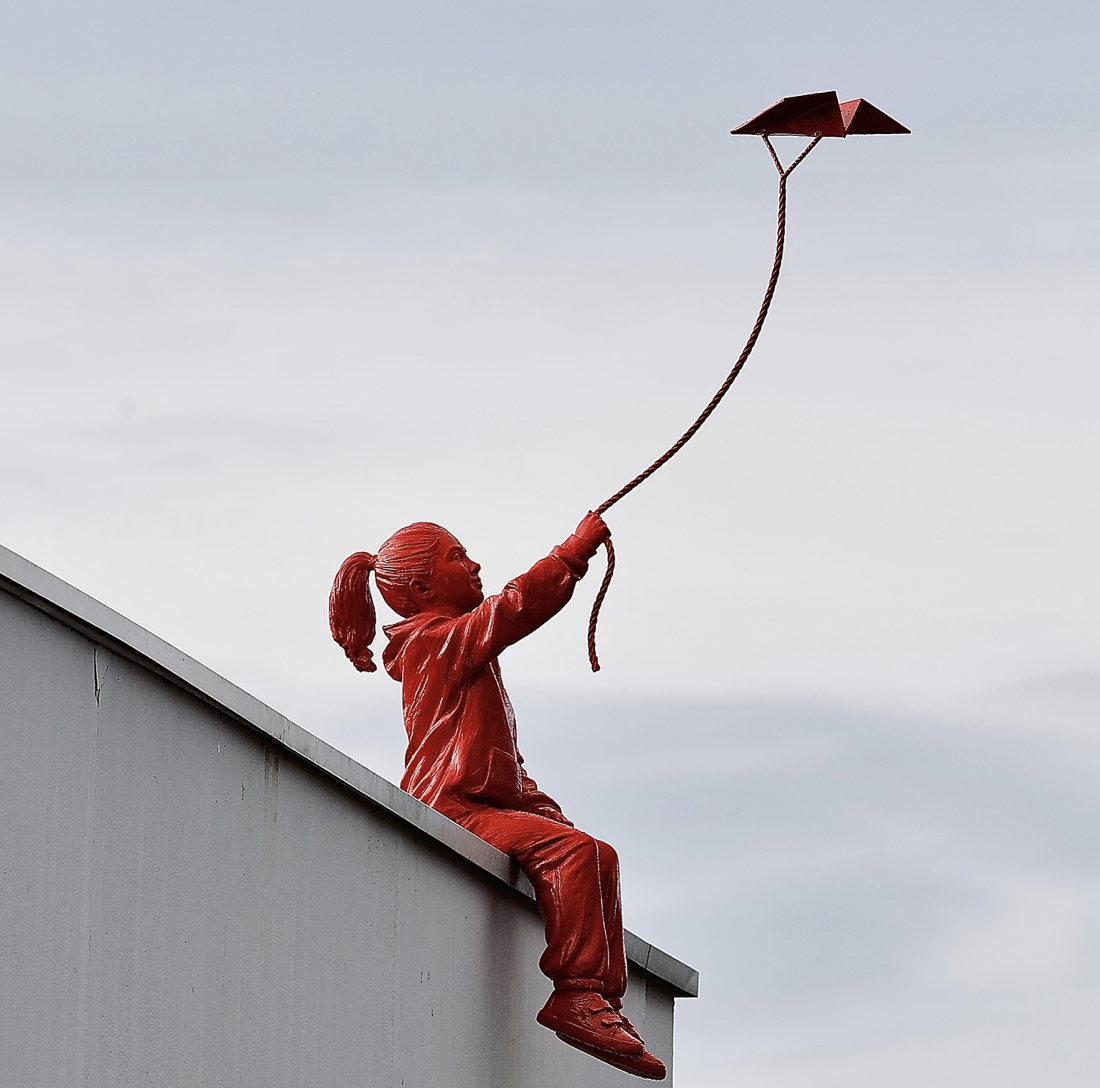
"The little girl with the kite" by James Colomina

The Théâtre du Capitole is the home of opera and ballet; there has been a theatre on the site since 1736. The Orchestre National du Capitole, long associated with Michel Plasson, plays at the Halle aux Grains. On 31 October 2023, Toulouse was named UNESCO City of Music.

Le Château d'Eau, an old 19th-century water-tower, was converted as a gallery in 1974 by Jean Dieuzaide, a French photographer from Toulouse and is now one of the oldest public places dedicated to photography in the world. Toulouse's art museums include the Musée des Augustins, the Musée des Abattoirs, the Musée Georges Labit, and the Fondation Bemberg in the Hôtel d'Assézat. The Musée Saint-Raymond is devoted to Antiquity and the Muséum de Toulouse to natural history.

Toulouse is the seat of the Académie des Jeux Floraux, the equivalent of the French Academy for the Occitan-speaking regions of southern France, making Toulouse the unofficial capital of Occitan culture. The traditional Cross of Toulouse (from Provence, under the name of cross of Provence), emblem of the County of Toulouse and commonly widespread around all of Occitania during the Middle Ages is the symbol of the city and of the newly founded Midi-Pyrénées région, as well as a popular Occitan symbol.

The city's gastronomic specialties include the Saucisse de Toulouse, a type of sausage, cassoulet Toulousain, a bean and pork stew, and garbure, a cabbage soup with poultry. Also, foie gras, the liver of an overfed duck or goose, is a delicacy commonly made in the Midi-Pyrénées.

== Sport ==
Stade Toulousain of the Top 14 is the most successful rugby union club in Europe, having been crowned European champions a record six times and French champions a record twenty-five times, most recently in 2024 and 2025 respectively. It is traditionally one of the main providers for the France national rugby union team and its youth academy is one of the best in the world. The club's home ground is the Stade Ernest-Wallon.

Toulouse Olympique represents the city in rugby league. The club has been playing in the British rugby league system since 2016. After gaining promotion to the Super League for the first time in 2021, they suffered relegation in their debut season, but were promoted to the top tier again in 2025. The club has had historical success in the French rugby league system, having won the French championship six times.

The city also has a professional football team, Toulouse FC, which plays in Ligue 1, the highest level of football in France. Toulouse FC won the Coupe de France in 2023, defeating FC Nantes in the final. (Note: An unrelated and now defunct club, also based in the city and named Toulouse Football Club, won the 1957 final.) The club plays at the Stadium de Toulouse, which was a venue during the 1998 FIFA World Cup and 2007 Rugby World Cup, and has hosted several Rugby League World Cup matches and important club rugby games. Toulouse was also a host city in EuroBasket 1999.

Major sports facilities and professional clubs

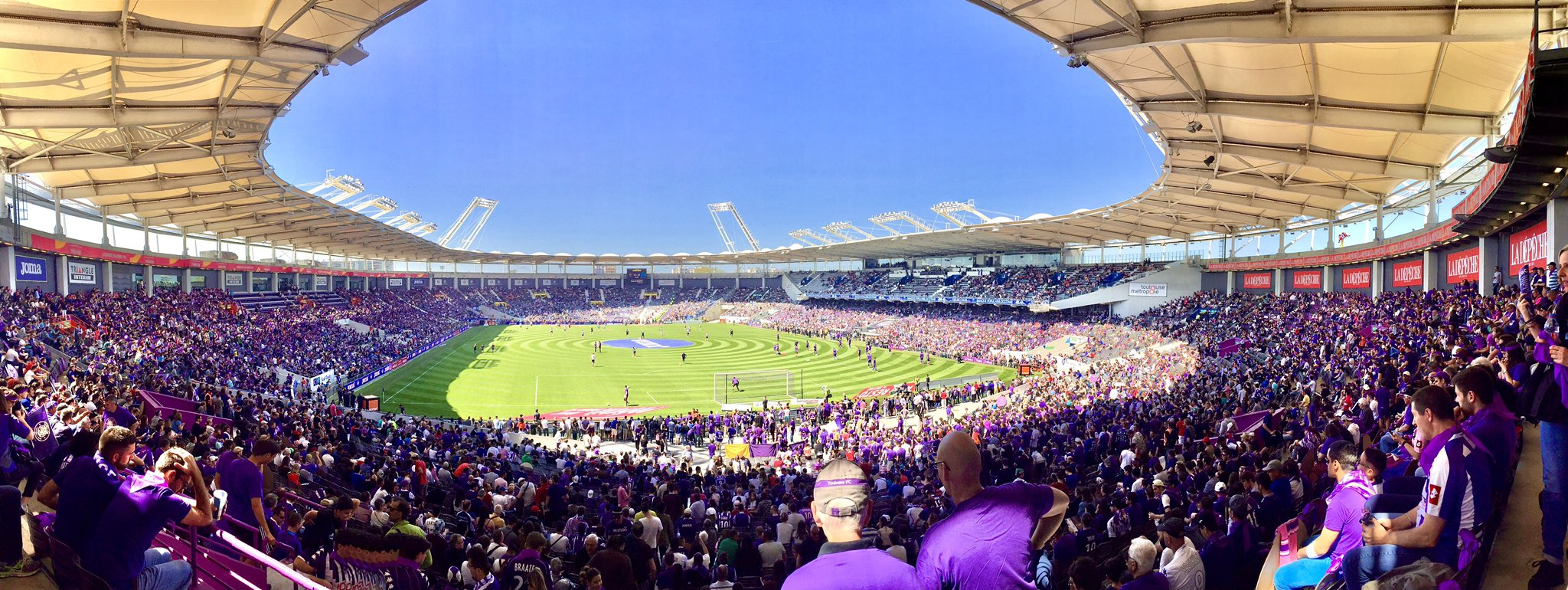
Stadium de Toulouse (capacity: 33,150)

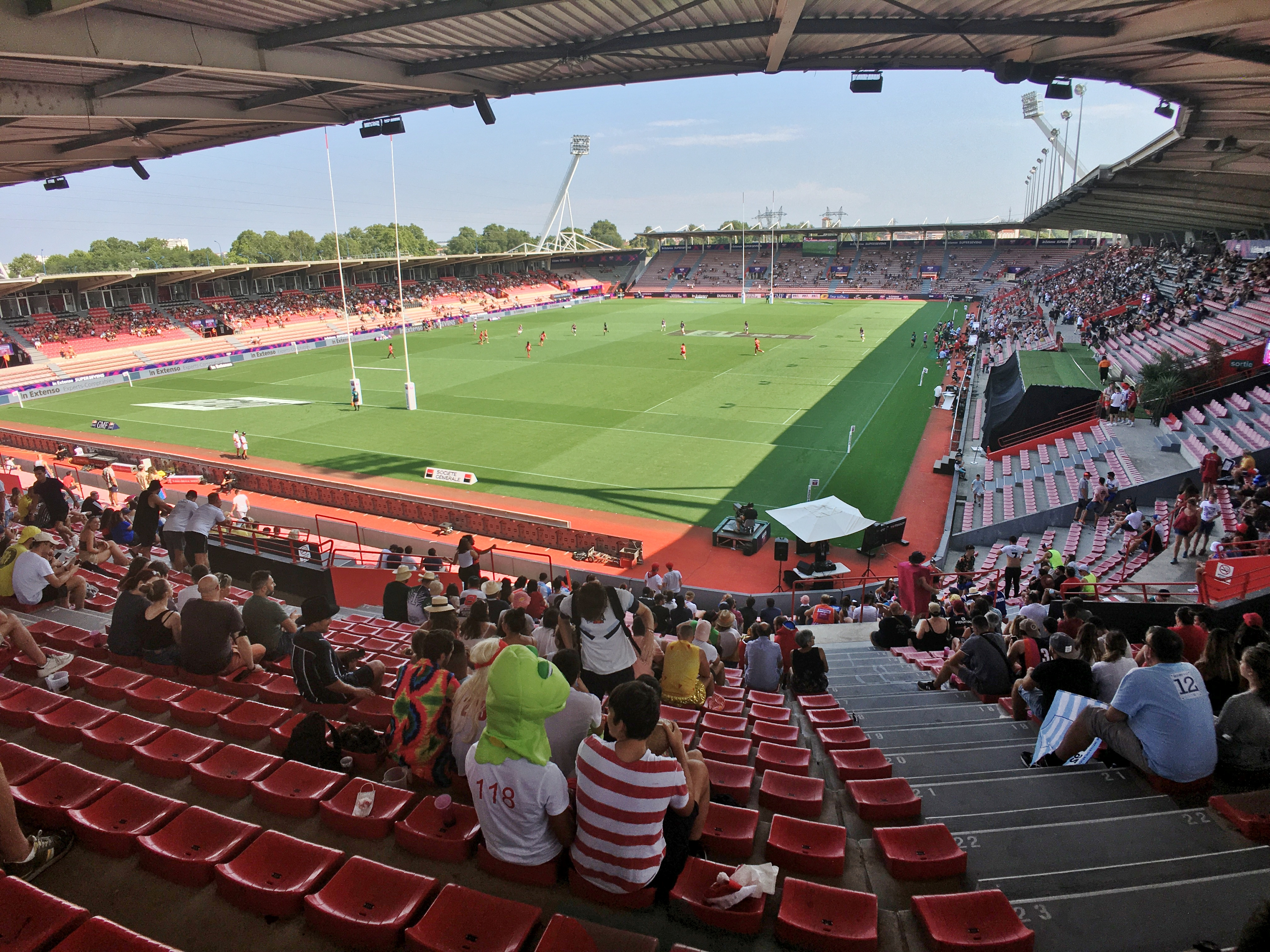
Stade Ernest Wallon (capacity: 19,500)

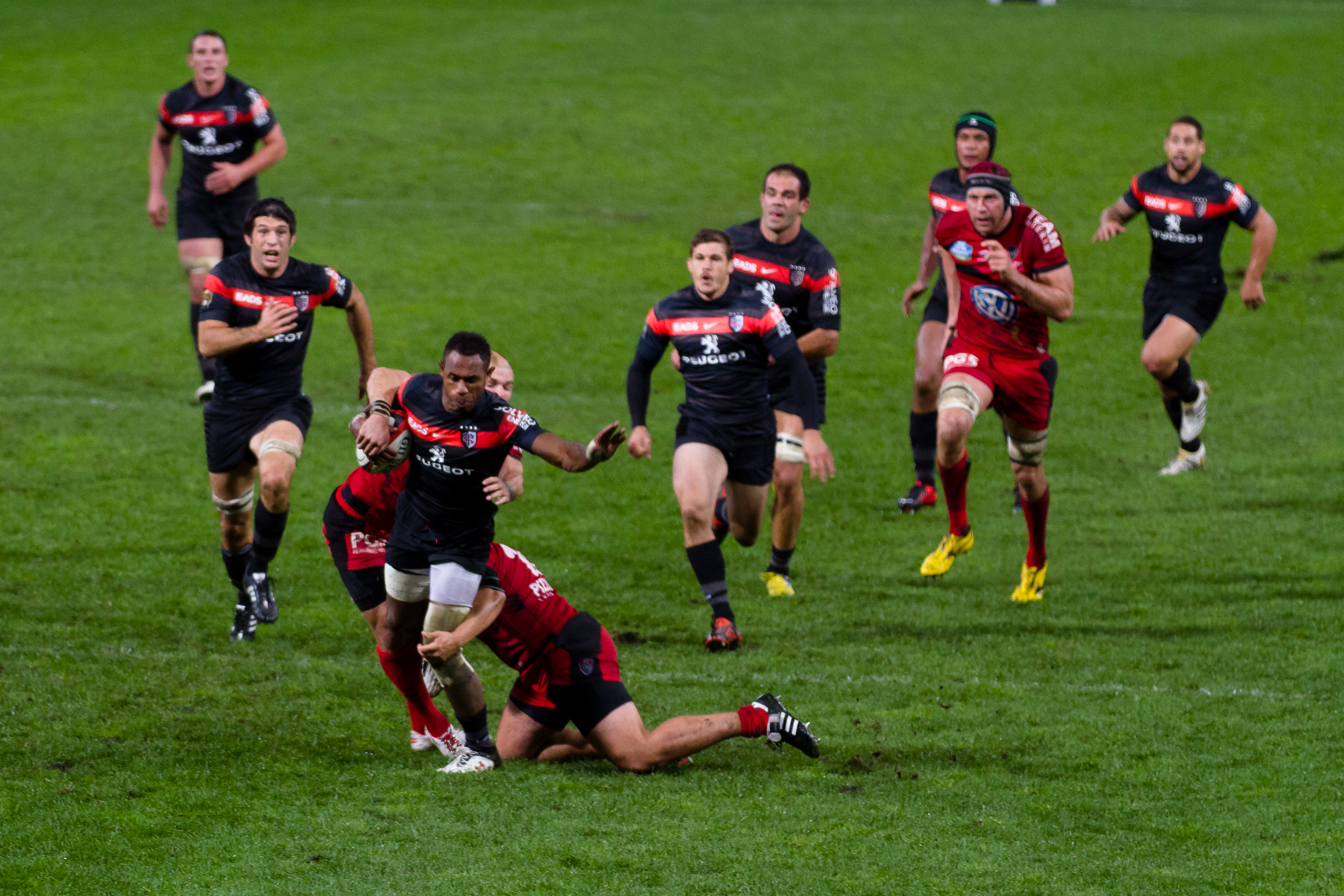
Rugby union: Stade Toulousain.

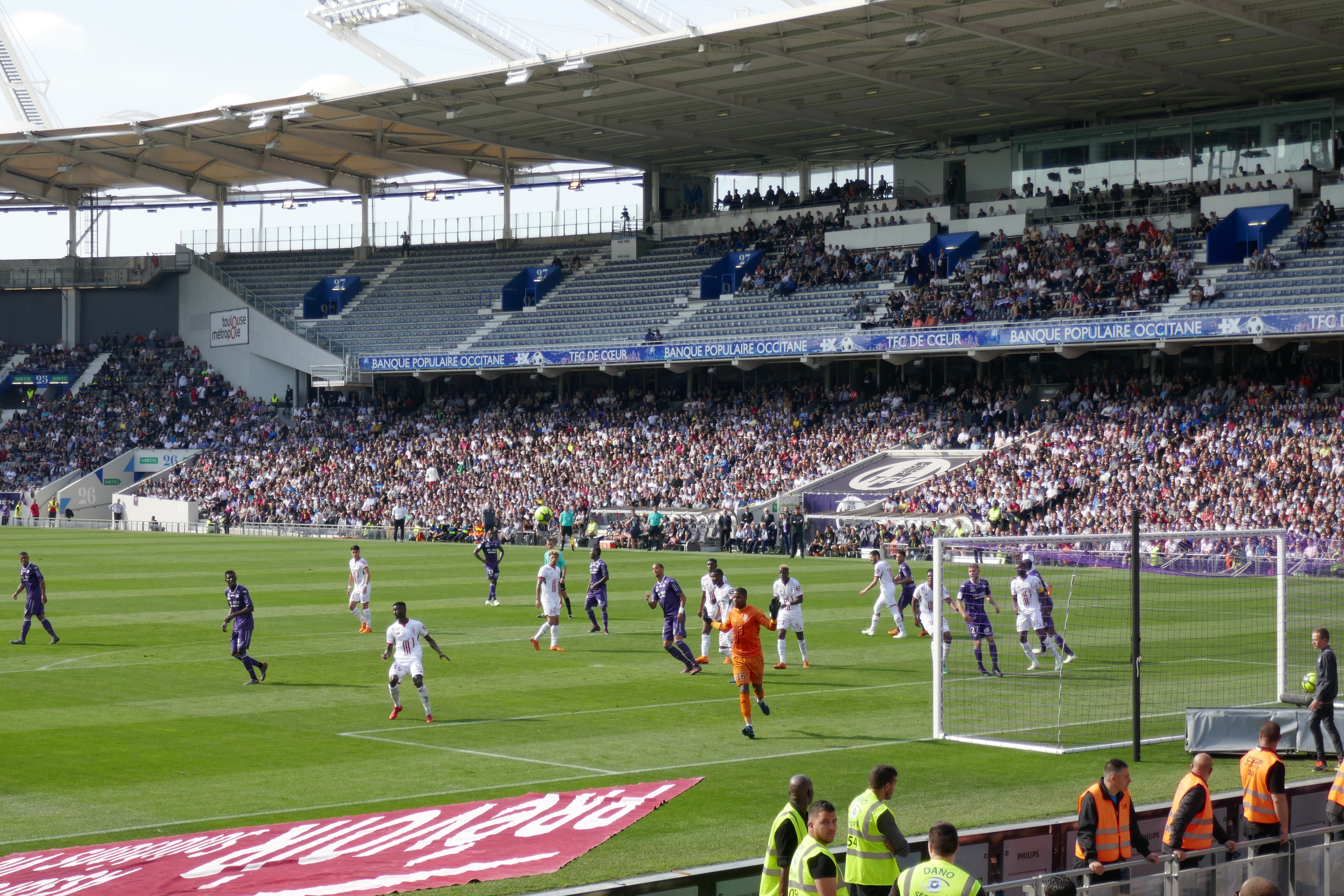
Football: Toulouse Football Club.

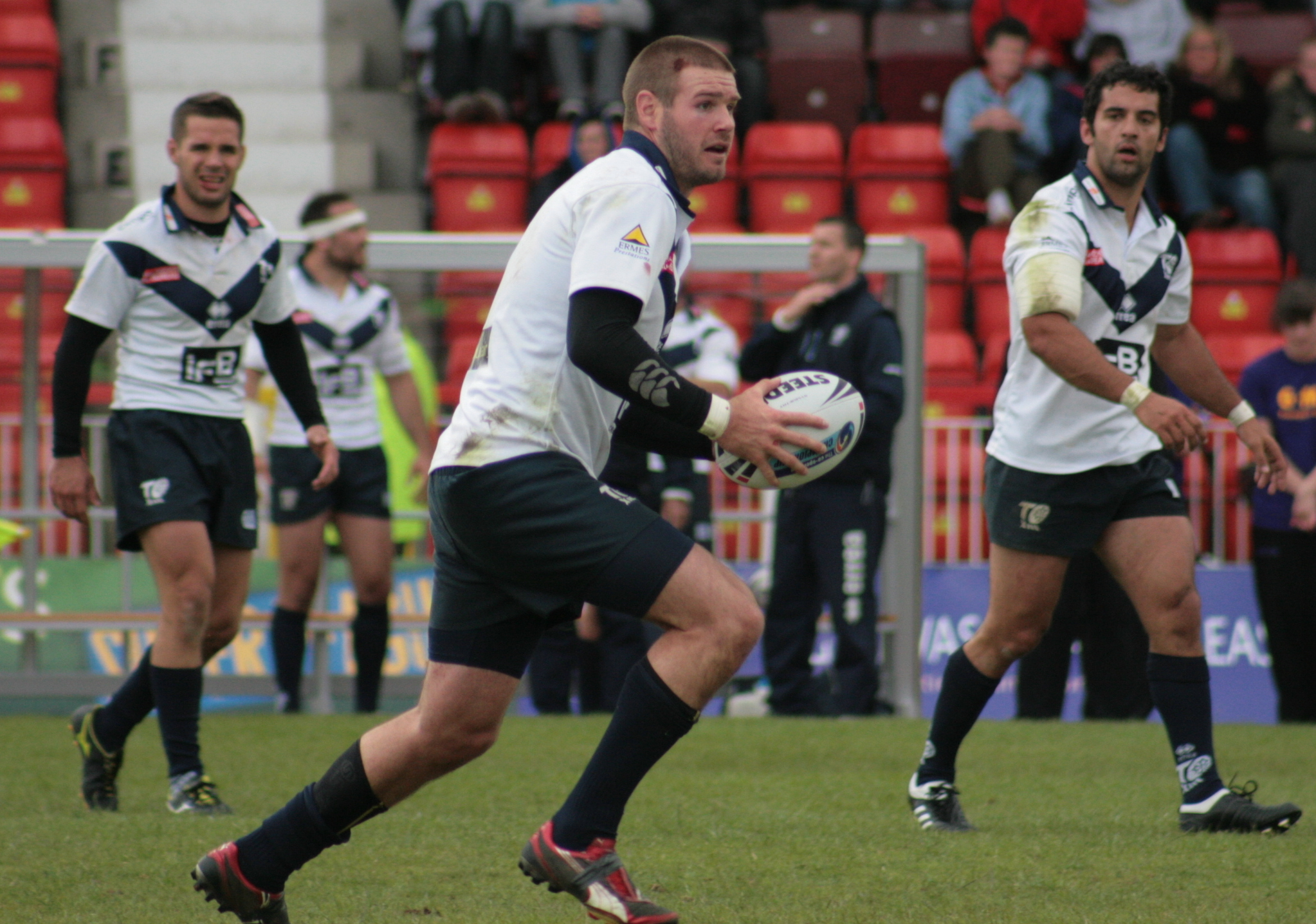
Rugby league: Toulouse Olympique.

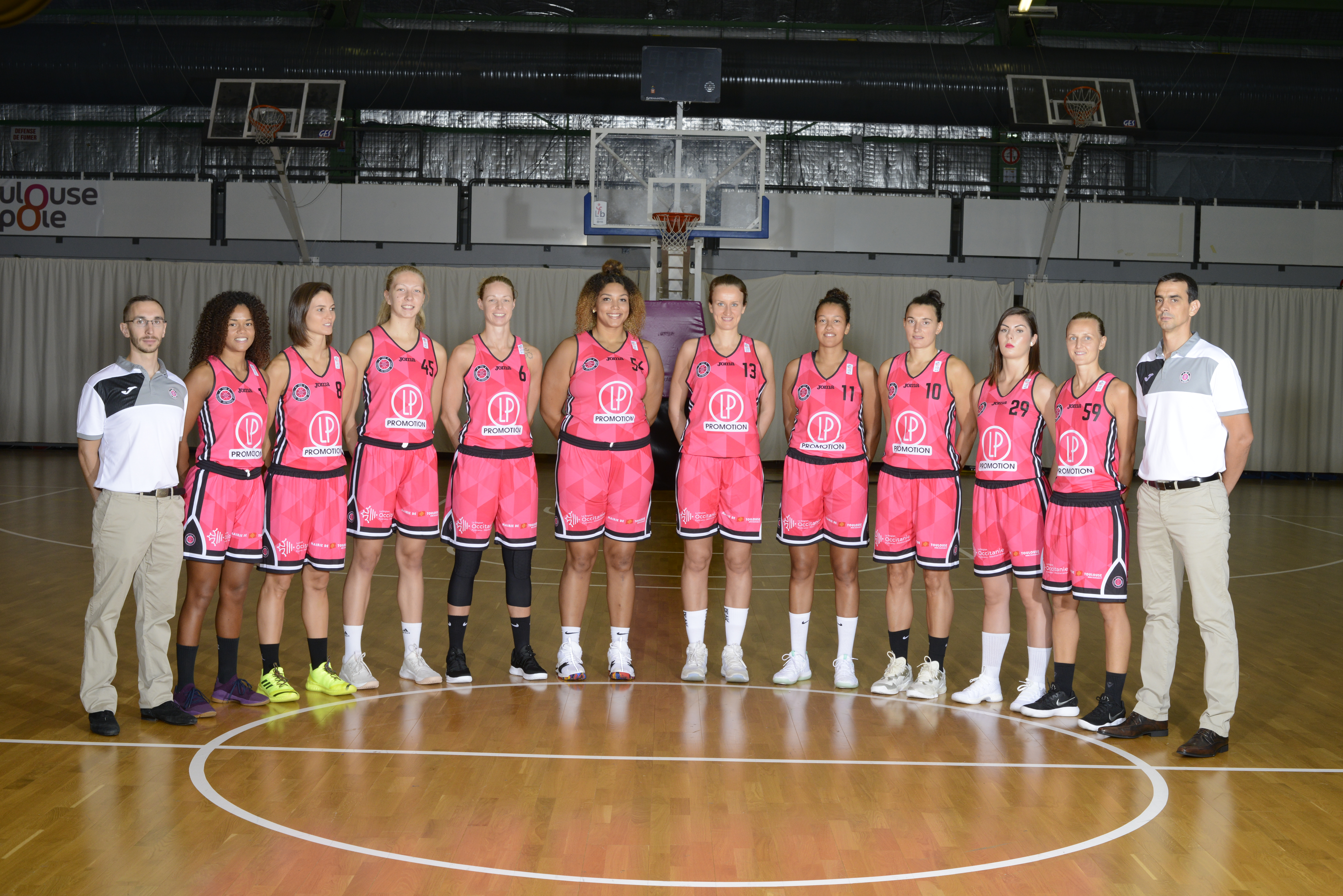
Women's basketball: Toulouse Métropole Basket.

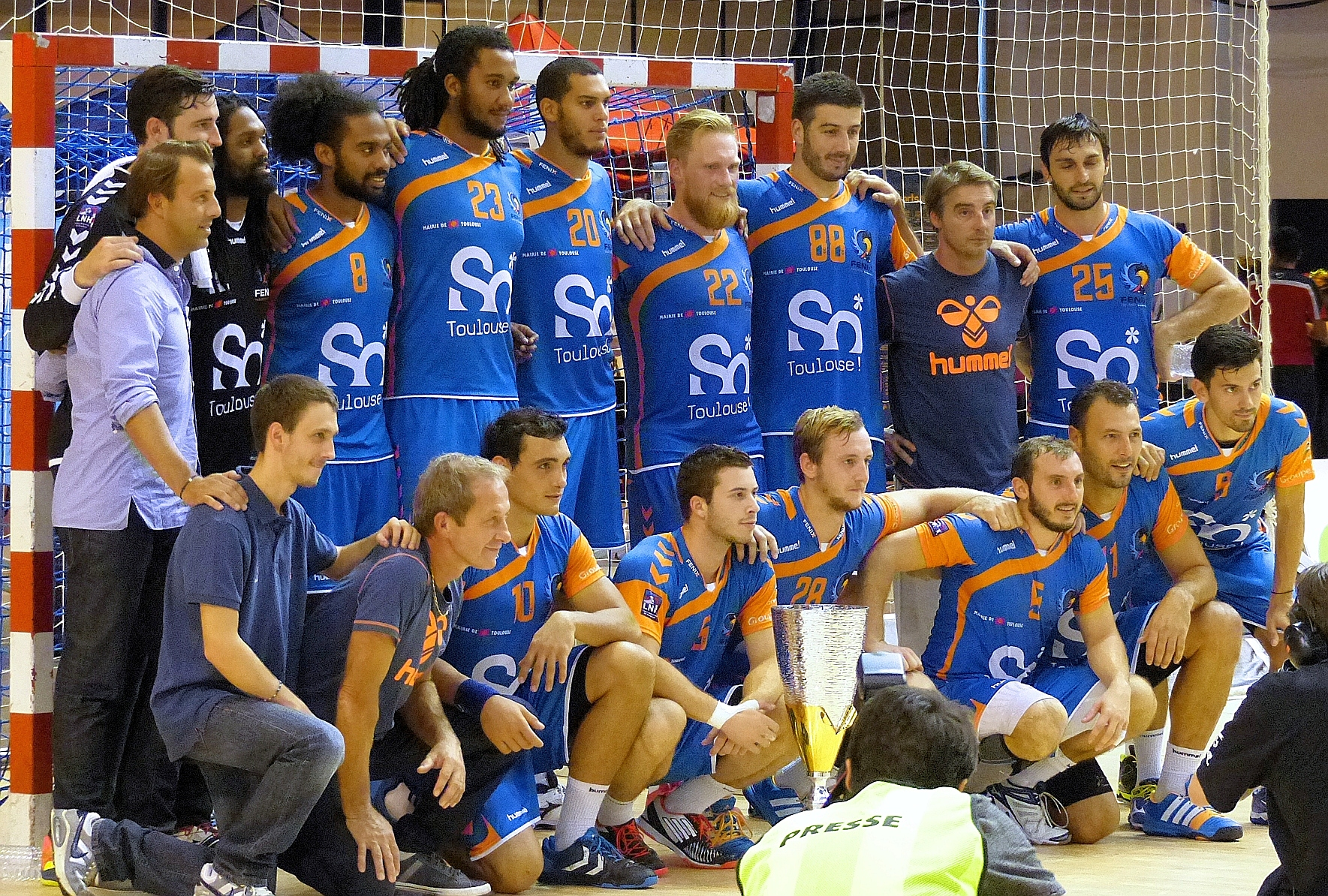
Handball: Fenix Toulouse Handball.

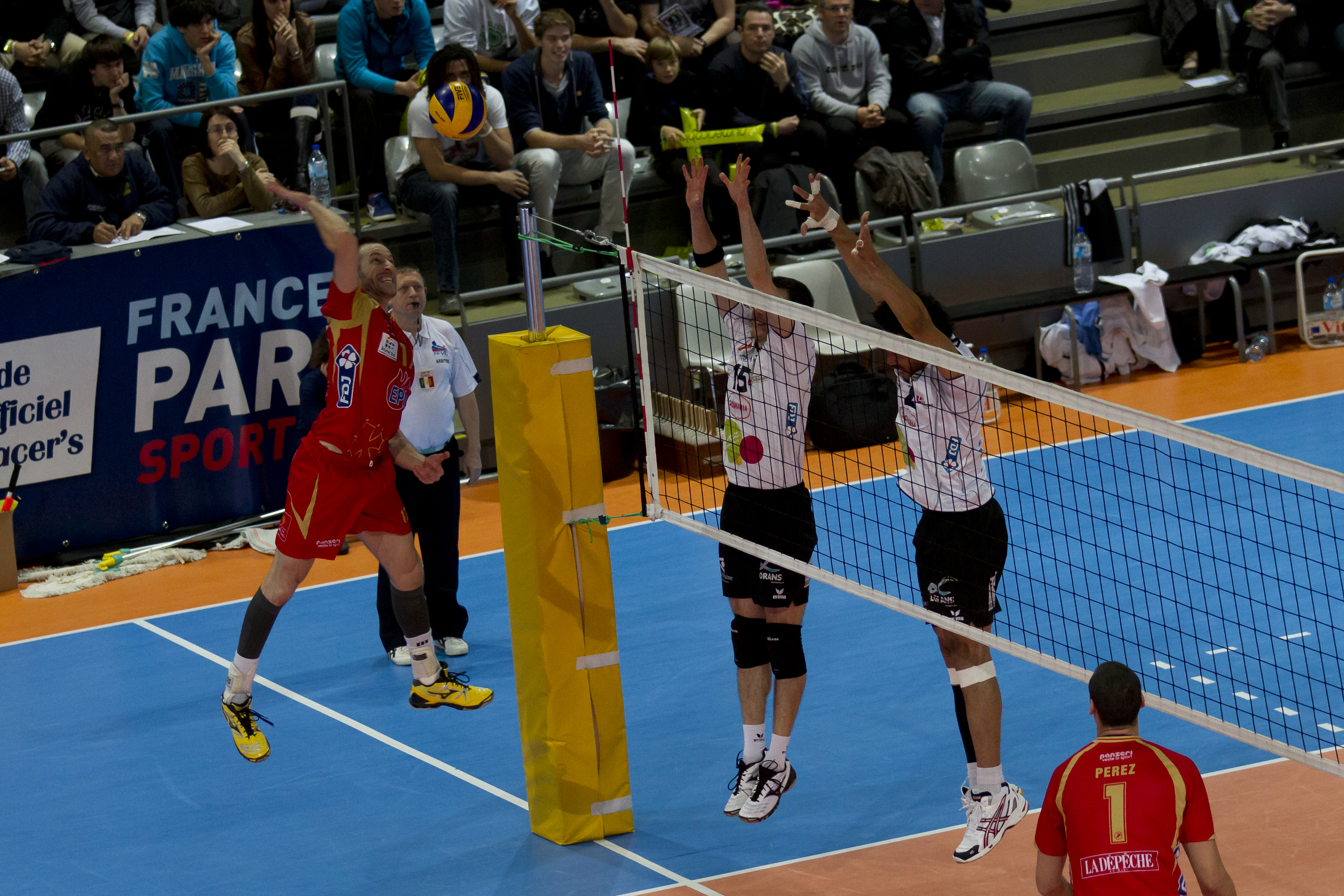
Volleyball: Spacer's Toulouse Volley.

== Notable people ==
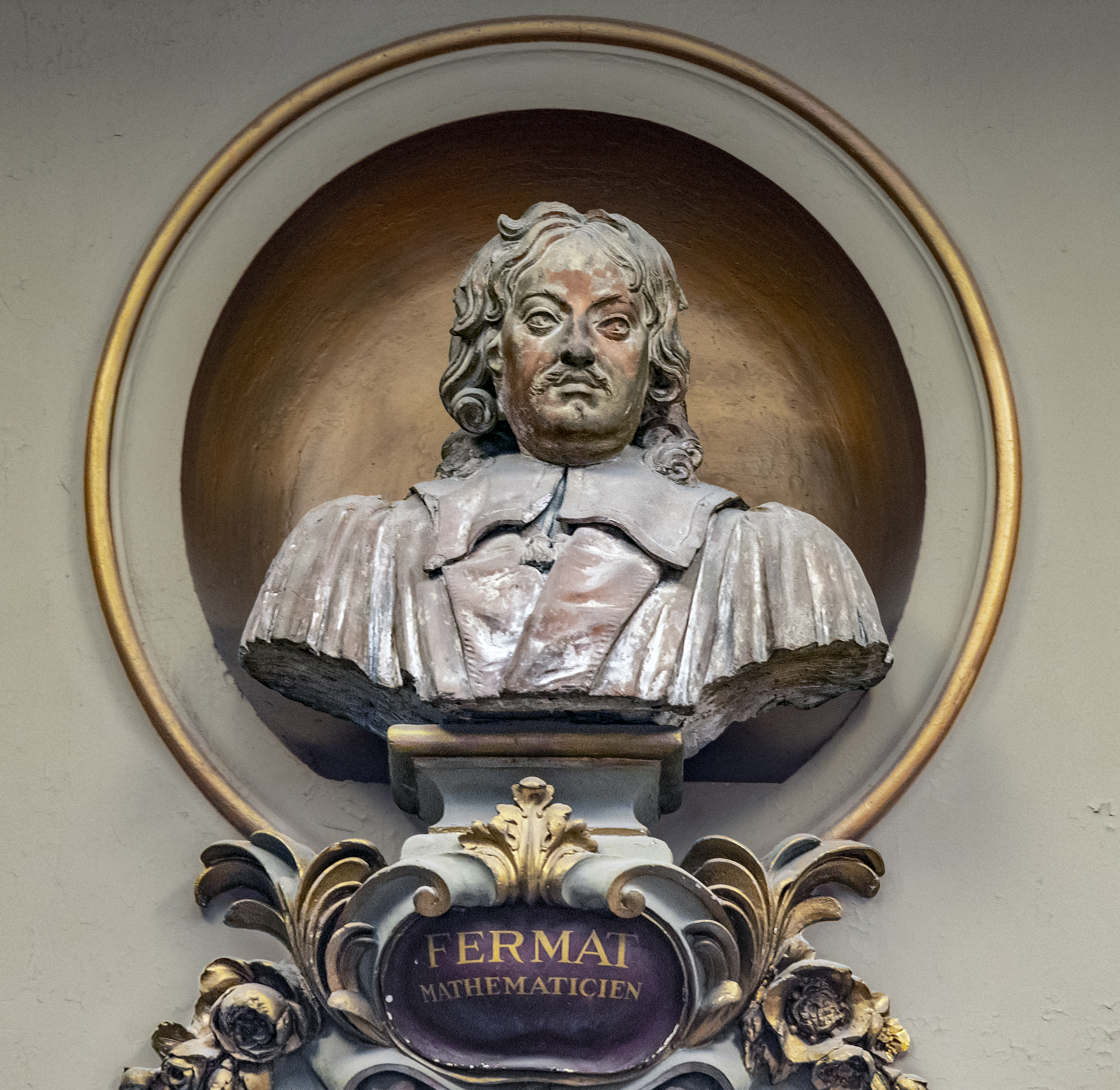
Bust of mathematician Pierre de Fermat in the Capitole de Toulouse

Several notable Toulousains have been scientists, such as Jean Dausset (1916–2009), 1980 winner of the Nobel Prize in Physiology or Medicine; 17th-century mathematician Pierre de Fermat (1607–1665), who spent his life in Toulouse, where he wrote Fermat's Last Theorem and was a lawyer in the city's parlement; Paul Sabatier (1854–1941), 1912 winner of the Nobel Prize in Chemistry; Albert Fert (b. 1938), 2007 winner of the Nobel Prize in Physics who grew up in Toulouse where he attended the Lycée Pierre-de-Fermat and Jean Tirole (b. 1953), owner of the 2014 Nobel Prize in Economic Sciences, chairman and founder of the Toulouse School of Economics along with Jean-Jacques Laffont.

Musically, Toulouse is one of the two controversial, disputed birthplaces of Carlos Gardel (1890–1935) (the other being Tacuarembo, Uruguay), probably the most prominent figure in the history of the tango. The city's most renowned songwriter is Claude Nougaro (1929–2004). The composer and organist Georges Guiraud (1868–1928) and songwriter Jain (b. 1992) were born in Toulouse.

Concerning arts, Toulouse is the birthplace of Impressionist painter Henri Martin (1860–1943) as well as sculptors Alexandre Falguière (1831–1900), Antonin Mercié (1845–1916) and illustrator Edmund Dulac (1882–1953). Moreover, Jean-Auguste-Dominique Ingres (1780–1867) and Antoine Bourdelle (1861–1929) were trained at the Toulouse fine arts school. Post Impressionist painter Henri de Toulouse-Lautrec's (1864–1901) father was Count Alphonse Charles de Toulouse-Lautrec Monfa (1838–1913) and was part of an aristocratic family of Counts of Toulouse, Odet de Foix, Vimcomte de Lautrec and the Viscounts of Montfa.

Raymond IV, Count of Toulouse (c. 1041–1105), one of the leaders of the First Crusade, was born in Toulouse. Aviation pioneer Clément Ader (1841–1925), acrobatic performer Jules Léotard (1838–1870) who gave his name to the leotard, and psychiatrist Jean-Étienne Dominique Esquirol (1772–1840) were also natives. French football legend Just Fontaine (1933–2023), record holder for the most goals in a single FIFA World Cup (thirteen in six games in 1958), lived in Toulouse for the last 60 years of his life. Léon Marchand (b. 2002), swimmer and four-time Olympic gold medalist grew up in Toulouse where he attended Toulouse III - Paul Sabatier University.

== International relations ==
=== Twin towns and sister cities ===
Toulouse is twinned with:

- Atlanta, United States, since 1975
- Bologna, Italy, since 1981
- Elche, Spain, since 1981
- Chongqing, China, since 1981
- Kyiv, Ukraine, since 1975
- Tel Aviv, Israel, since 1962

=== Other cooperations ===
Toulouse also has accords of cooperation with the following towns:

- Zaragoza, Aragón, Spain
- N'Djamena, Chad
- Hanoi, Vietnam
- Saint-Louis, Senegal
- Düsseldorf, Germany
- Kfardebian, Lebanon

== See also ==
- 138 Tolosa, an asteroid
- Roman Catholic Archdiocese of Toulouse
- André Abbal
- Listing of the works of Alexandre Falguière
- The works of Antonin Mercié
- List of the mayors of Toulouse
