= List of SNCF stations in Occitanie =

This article contains a list of current SNCF railway stations in the Occitanie region of France.

== Ariège (09) ==
- Andorre-L'Hospitalet
- Ax-les-Thermes
- Les Cabannes
- Foix
- Luzenac-Garanou
- Mérens-les-Vals
- Pamiers
- Saint-Jean-de-Verges
- Saverdun
- Tarascon-sur-Ariège
- Varilhes
- Le Vernet-d'Ariège

== Aude (11) ==
- Bram
- Carcassonne
- Castelnaudary
- Couffoulens-Leuc
- Coursan
- Leucate-La Franqui
- Lézignan-Corbières
- Limoux
- Limoux-Flassian
- Narbonne
- Pomas
- Port-la-Nouvelle
- Verzeille

== Aveyron (12) ==
- Aubin
- Baraqueville-Carcenac-Peyralès
- Campagnac-Saint-Geniez
- Capdenac
- Cransac
- Luc-Primaube
- Millau
- Montpaon
- Najac
- Naucelle
- Nuces
- Rodez
- Saint-Christophe
- Saint-Georges-de-Luzençon
- Saint-Rome-de-Cernon
- Salles-Courbatiès
- Sévérac-le-Château
- Tournemire-Roquefort
- Villefranche-de-Rouergue
- Viviez-Decazeville

== Gard (30) ==
- Aigues-Mortes
- Aimargues
- Alès
- Beaucaire
- Beauvoisin
- Boucoiran
- Le Cailar
- Chamborigaud
- Fons-Saint-Mamert
- Gallargues
- Générac
- Génolhac
- Grand'Combe-la-Pise
- Le Grau-du-Roi
- La Lavade
- Milhaud
- Nîmes
- Nîmes-Pont-du-Gard
- Nozières-Brignon
- Saint-Césaire
- Sainte-Cécile-d'Andorage
- Saint-Geniès-de-Malgoirès
- Saint-Laurent-d'Aigouze
- Uchaud
- Vauvert
- Vergèze-Codognan

== Gers (32) ==
- Aubiet
- Auch
- Gimont-Cahuzac
- L'Isle-Jourdain

== Haute-Garonne (31) ==
- Auterive
- Avignonet
- Baziège
- Boussens
- Brax-Léguevin
- Carbonne
- Castelnau-d'Estrétefonds
- Cazères
- Cintegabelle
- Colomiers
- Colomiers-Lycée-International
- Escalquens
- Le Fauga
- Gallieni-Cancéropôle
- Gragnague
- Labège-Innopole
- Labège-Village
- Lacourtensourt
- Lardenne
- Longages-Noé
- Martres-Tolosane
- Mérenvielle
- Montastruc-la-Conseillère
- Montaudran
- Montlaur
- Montrabé
- Montréjeau-Gourdan-Polignan
- Muret
- Pibrac
- Pins-Justaret
- Portet-Saint-Simon
- Ramassiers
- Roqueserière-Buzet
- Saint-Gaudens
- Saint-Jory
- Saint-Martin-du-Touch
- Saint-Martory
- Le TOEC
- Toulouse-Matabiau
- Toulouse-Saint-Agne
- Toulouse-Saint-Cyprien-Arènes
- Venerque-le-Vernet
- Villefranche-de-Lauragais
- Villenouvelle

== Hautes-Pyrénées (65) ==
- Capvern
- Lannemezan
- Lourdes
- Ossun
- Saint-Pé-de-Bigorre
- Tarbes
- Tournay

== Hérault (34) ==
- Agde
- Baillargues
- Bédarieux
- Béziers
- Le Bousquet-d'Orb
- Les Cabrils
- Ceilhes-Roqueredonde
- Frontignan
- Lunas
- Lunel
- Lunel-Viel
- Magalas
- Marseillan-Plage
- Montpellier-Saint-Roch
- Montpellier Sud de France
- Saint-Aunès
- Sète
- Valergues-Lansargues
- Vias
- Vic-Mireval
- Villeneuve-lès-Maguelone

== Lot (46) ==
- Assier
- Bagnac
- Bretenoux-sur-Biars
- Cahors
- Dégagnac
- Figeac
- Gignac-Cressensac
- Gourdon
- Gramat
- Lalbenque-Fontanes
- Laval-de-Cère
- Puybrun
- Les Quatre-Routes
- Rocamadour-Padirac
- Saint-Denis-près-Martel
- Souillac

== Lozère (48) ==
- Allenc
- Aumont-Aubrac
- Bagnols-Chadenet
- Balsièges-Bourg
- Banassac-La Canourgue
- Barjac
- La Bastide–Saint-Laurent-les-Bains
- Belvezet
- Le Bruel
- Chanac
- Chapeauroux
- Chasseradès
- Chirac
- Langogne
- Luc
- Marvejols
- Mende
- Le Monastier
- Saint-Chély-d'Apcher
- Les Salelles
- Villefort

== Pyrénées-Orientales (66) ==
- Argelès-sur-Mer
- Banyuls-sur-Mer
- Béna Fanès
- Bolquère-Eyne
- Bourg-Madame
- Cerbère
- Collioure
- Elne
- Err
- Estavar
- Fontpédrouse-Saint-Thomas-les-Bains
- Font-Romeu-Odeillo-Via
- Ille-sur-Têt
- Joncet
- Latour-de-Carol-Enveitg
- Marquixanes
- Millas
- Mont-Louis-La Cabanasse
- Nyer
- Olette-Canaveilles-les-Bains
- Osséja
- Perpignan
- Planès
- Porté-Puymorens
- Port-Vendres-Ville
- Prades-Molitg-les-Bains
- Ria
- Rivesaltes
- Saillagouse
- Sainte-Léocadie
- Saint-Féliu-d'Avall
- Salses
- Sauto
- Serdinya
- Le Soler
- Thuès-Carança
- Thuès-les-Bains
- Ur-Les Escaldes
- Villefranche–Vernet-les-Bains
- Vinça

== Tarn (81) ==
- Albi-Madeleine
- Albi-Ville
- Carmaux
- Castres
- Les Cauquillous
- Cordes-Vindrac
- Damiatte-Saint-Paul
- Gaillac
- Labruguière
- Lavaur
- Lisle-sur-Tarn
- Marssac-sur-Tarn
- Mazamet
- Rabastens-Couffouleux
- Saint-Sulpice
- Tanus
- Tessonnières
- Vielmur-sur-Agout

== Tarn-et-Garonne (82) ==
- Albias
- Castelsarrasin
- Caussade
- Dieupentale
- Grisolles
- Laguépie
- Lamagistère
- Lexos
- Moissac
- Montauban-Ville-Bourbon
- Montbartier
- Valence-d'Agen
- La Ville-Dieu

== See also ==
- List of SNCF stations for SNCF stations in other regions
