= Les Cabrils station =

Railway station in Roqueredonde, France

Les Cabrils
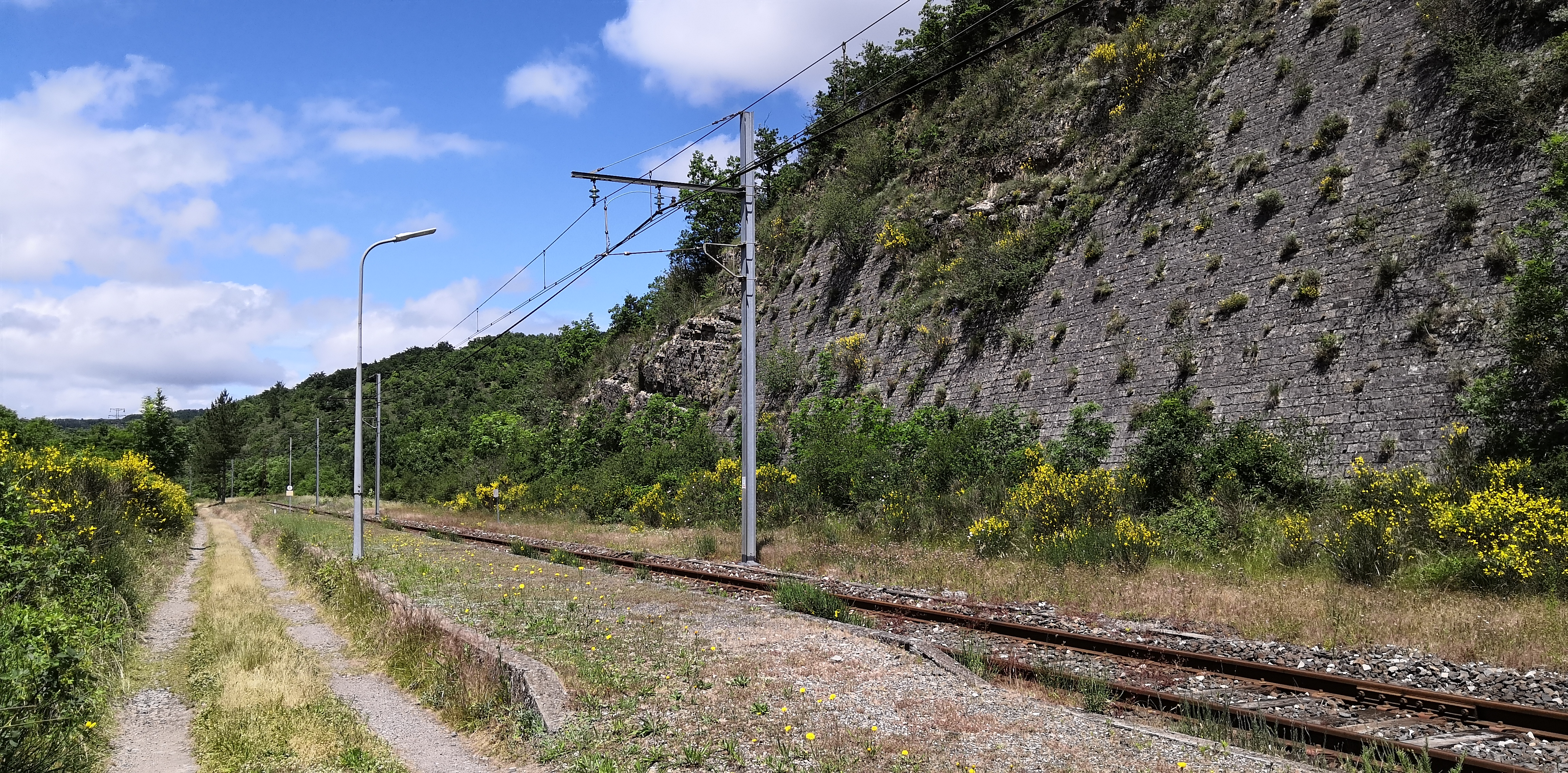
- Passenger platform at the station.

General information
- Location: RD 138e3, 34650 Roqueredonde
- Coordinates: 43.7795°N 3.1860°E
- Owner: SNCF
- Operator: SNCF
- Platforms: 1
- Tracks: 1

Construction
- Structure type: Open-air shelter
- Parking: no
- Accessible: yes

History
- Opened: 18 October 1874

Passengers
- 2019: 15
- Rank: least-used station on the SNCF

Services
Preceding station	TER Occitanie	Following station
Ceilhes-Roqueredonde towards Saint-Chély-d'Apcher	28	Lunas towards Béziers
Location

Les Cabrils station (French: Gare des Cabrils) is a French train station on the Béziers–Neussargues railway, located at Les Cabrils, in the Roqueredonde commune, in the Hérault department, in Occitanie.

It was put into service 1874, by the Compagnie des chemins de fer du Midi et du Canal latéral à la Garonne.

It is an SNCF passenger stop, served by the TER Occitanie service.

== Railway location ==
At an altitude of 526 metres (1,726 ft), les Cabrils is located at kilometeric point (PK) 495,311 of the Béziers- Neussargues rail line, between the former Joncels station and Ceilhes - Roqueredonde station.

A transit station, it has a platform served by a single-track railway.

== History ==
Les Cabrils station opened for train service on 18 October 1874 by the Compagnie des chemins de fer du Midi et du Canal latéral à la Garonne when it opened the section of the line from Bousquet-d'Orb station to Millau station. It was established in a place called "des Cabrils" (goat in patois).

In 2014, the passenger stop was classified as a local interest passenger station (SNCF category C : less than 100 000 travellers a year from 2010 to 2011), which has a single track platform.

It is the least frequented active SNCF passenger station, with only 14 boardings recorded in 2015.

=== Station information ===
Operating as an SNCF railway stop, it is an unstaffed, open air shelter. As of 2021, SNCF confirms the station has an automatic regional rail ticket dispenser and is handicapped accessible.

=== Area served ===
Les Cabrils is served by TER Occitanie trains running between Béziers - Saint-Chély-d'Apcher station, or Millau. It serves residents of the valley as a transportation link to the larger towns in the area

As of February 2021, there appears to have been a second track and a passing loop at the location, long since removed. Two trains in each direction travel to the location. The open-air shelter was noted to have a timetable, onwards travel information and a help point/ emergency telephone.

The location of the stop in the middle of nature, perhaps of interest to local hikers going to the Monts d'Orb, the Causse de Gabriac and the Escandorgue plateau, is in an otherwise "illogical" place.

Marianne magazine featured the site in a July 2020 article, calling it "the most deserted station in France" and confirming how little-used the station is, even if it serves a somewhat-limited function, allowing residents of the largely rural area to access larger urban centers for shopping or other needs.

== Railway Heritage ==
The former passenger station building has been turned into a private residence.

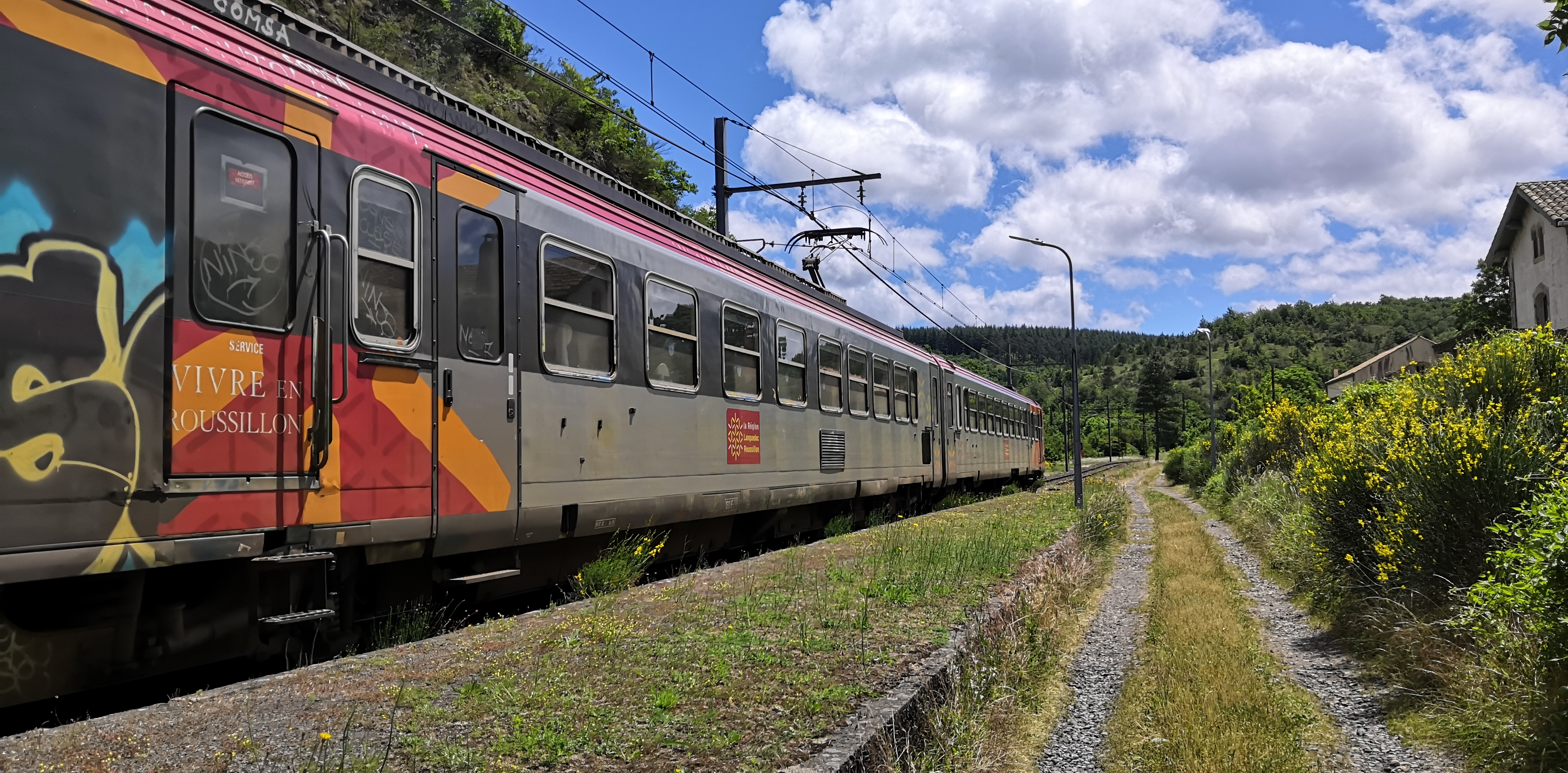
A TER stopped at the station.

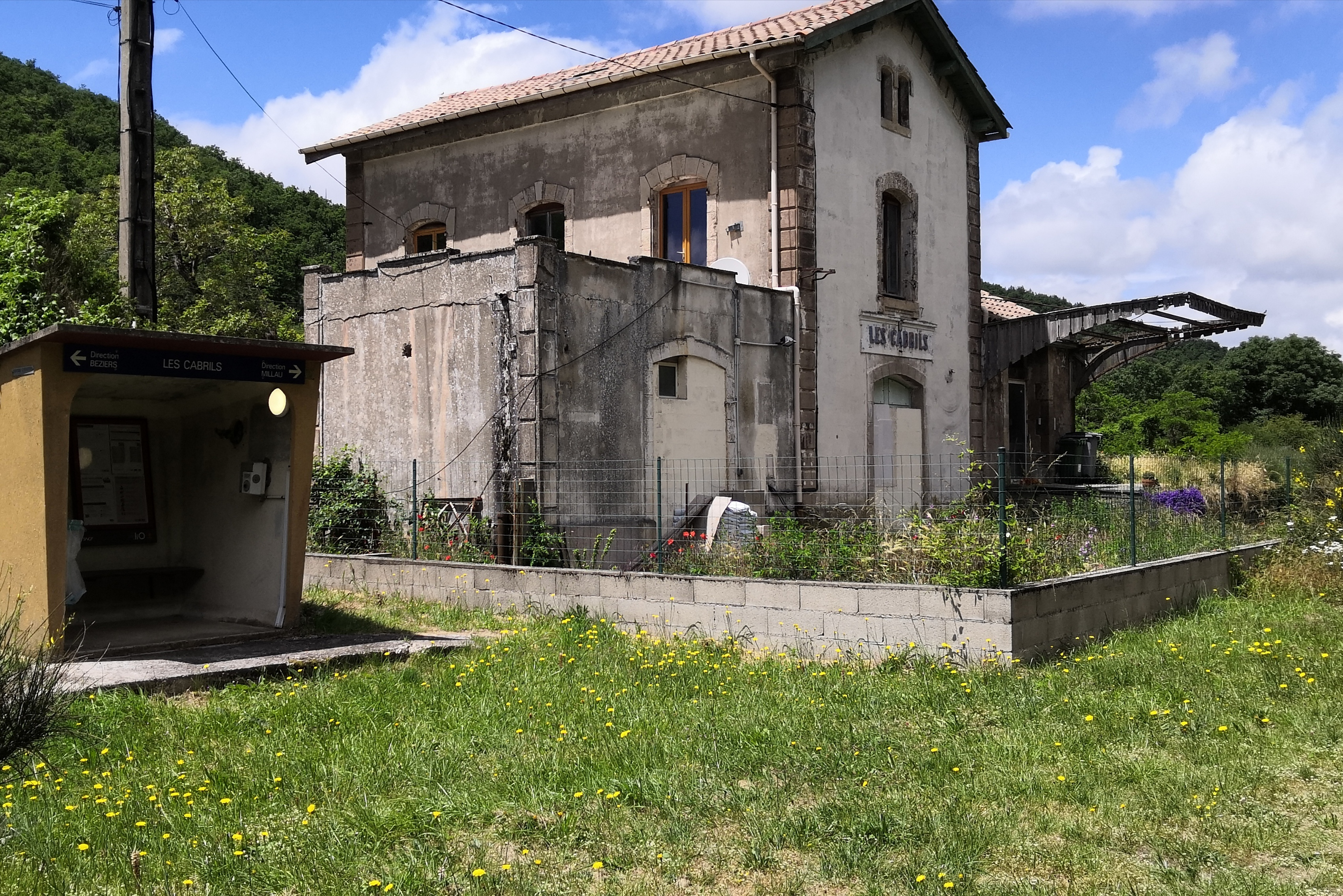
The former passenger station beside the current shelter.

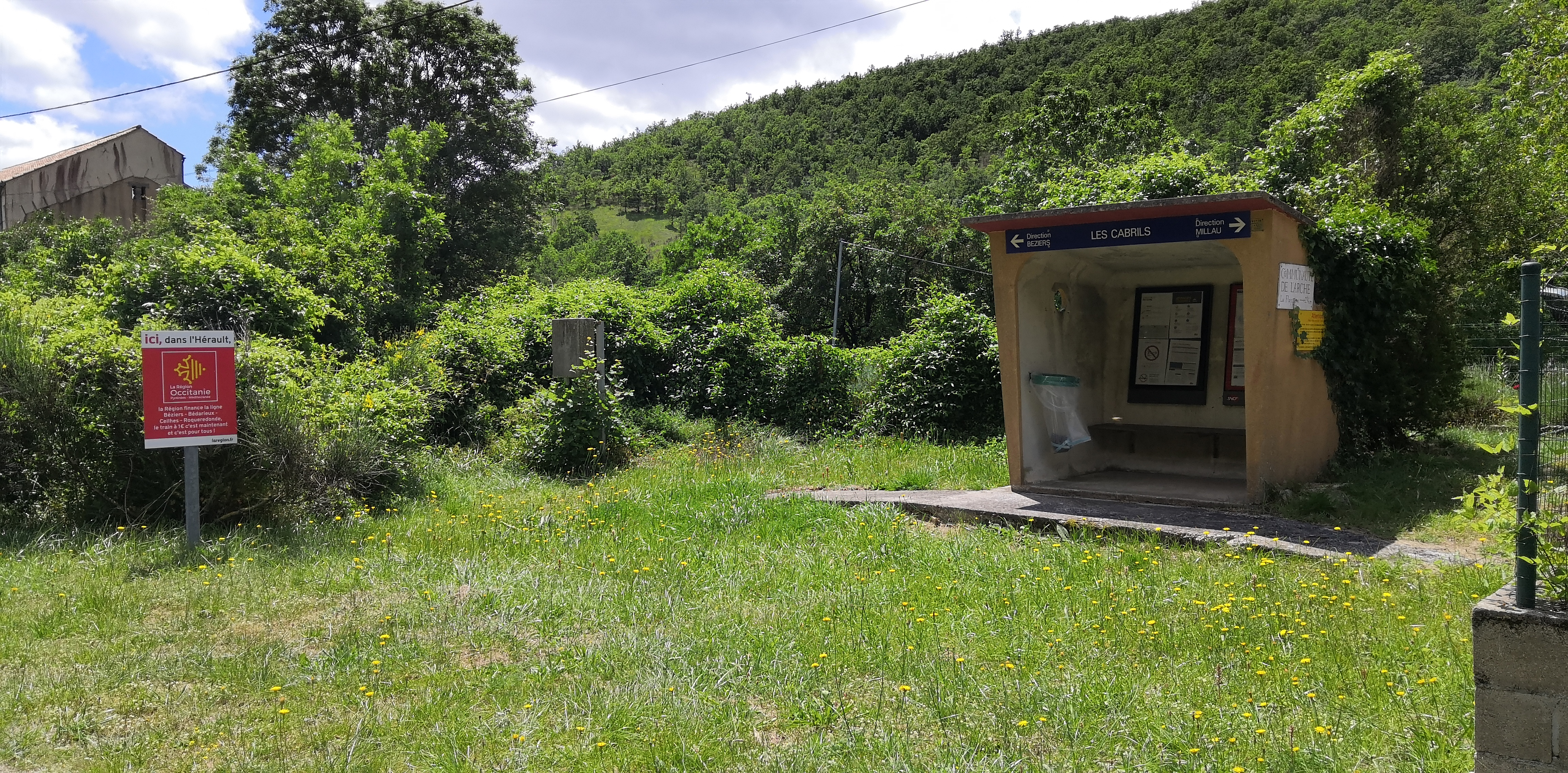
Passenger shelter.

== See also ==
- List of SNCF stations in Occitanie
