= Montlaur station =

Railway station in Montlaur, France

Montlaur

General information
- Location: Montlaur, Haute-Garonne, Occitanie, France
- Coordinates: 43.4752°N 1.57771°E
- Line: Bordeaux–Sète railway

Other information
- Station code: 87618207

Services
Preceding station	TER Occitanie	Following station
Escalquens towards Toulouse	10	Baziège towards Narbonne
Location

Montlaur is a railway station in Montlaur, Haute-Garonne, Occitanie, southern France. Within TER Occitanie, it is part of line 10 (Toulouse–Narbonne).
