= Agde station =

Railway station in Agde, France

Agde
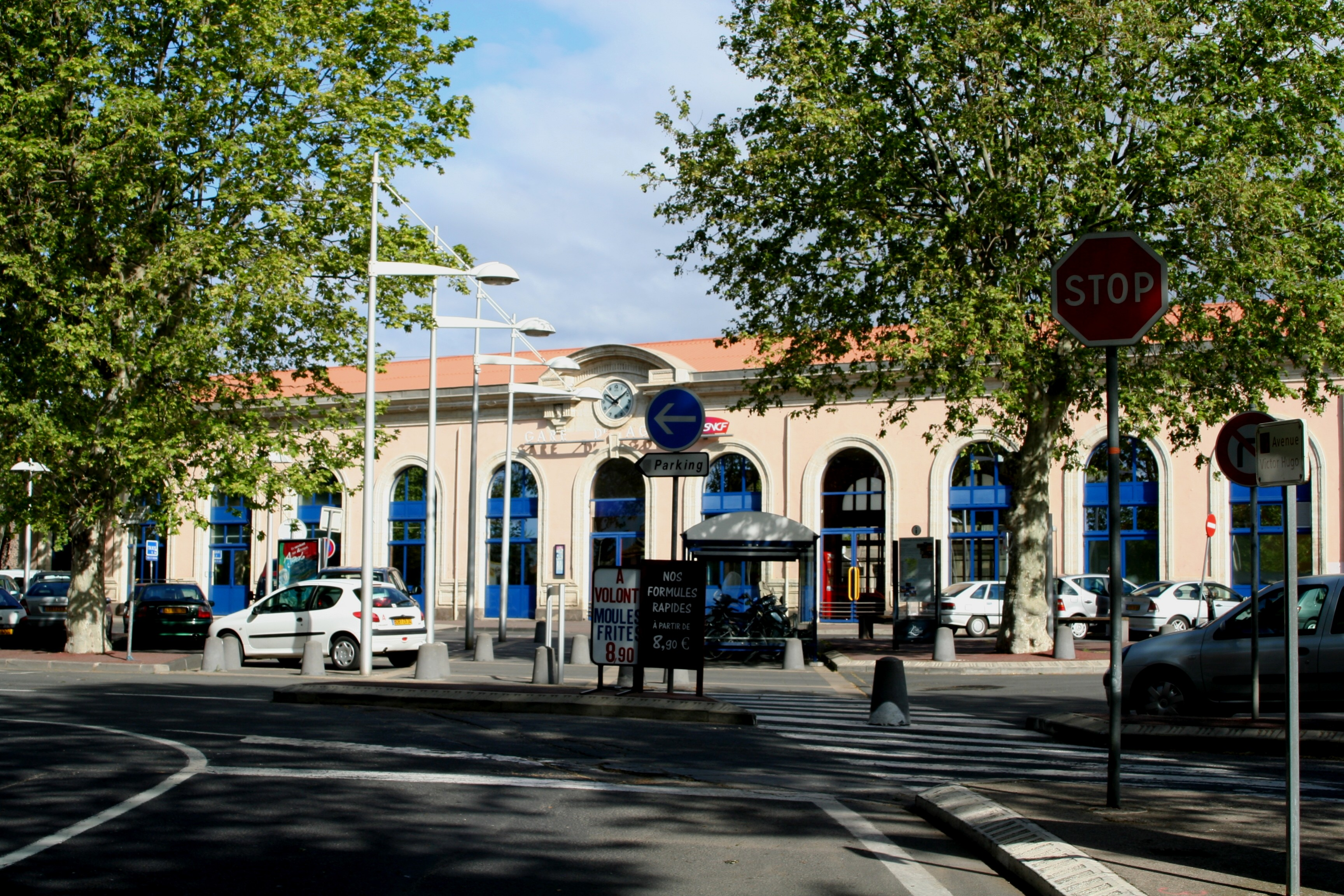
- Agde railway station

General information
- Location: Agde, Hérault, Occitanie, France
- Coordinates: 43°19′03″N 3°27′55″E
- Line: Bordeaux–Sète railway
- Platforms: 4
- Tracks: 4

Other information
- Station code: 87781278

History
- Opened: 19 January 1857

Services
Preceding station	SNCF	Following station
Sète towards Paris-Lyon	TGV inOui	Béziers Terminus
Sète towards Paris-Lyon	TGV inOui	Béziers towards Perpignan
Sète towards Paris-Lyon	TGV inOui	Béziers towards Barcelona Sants
Preceding station	TER Occitanie	Following station
Béziers towards Narbonne	6	Sète towards Marseille
Vias towards Narbonne	21	Marseillan-Plage towards Avignon-Centre
Béziers towards Portbou	22	Sète towards Avignon-Centre
Location

Agde station is in the département of Hérault in the south of France. Its railway station was opened in 1857 and is on the Bordeaux–Sète line. Its train services are operated by the SNCF. TGV, Intercités and TER Occitanie trains stop at Agde. The station serves the nearby tourist resort of Cap d'Agde.

== Train services ==
Train services depart from Agde to major French cities including Paris, Montpellier, Perpignan, Toulouse, Avignon, and Marseille.

International services operate to Barcelona.

The station is served by the following service(s):

- High-speed services (TGV) Paris–Valence–Nîmes–Montpellier (–Béziers)
- High-speed services (TGV) Paris–Lyon–Nîmes–Montpellier–Narbonne–Perpignan
- High-speed service (TGV) Paris–Valence–Nîmes–Montpellier–Perpignan–Barcelona
- Regional service (TER Occitanie) Narbonne–Béziers–Montpellier–Nîmes–Avignon
- Regional service (TER Occitanie) Cerbère–Perpignan–Narbonne–Montpellier–Nîmes–Avignon
- Regional service (TER Occitanie) Narbonne–Montpellier–Nîmes–Arles–Marseille

== Gallery ==
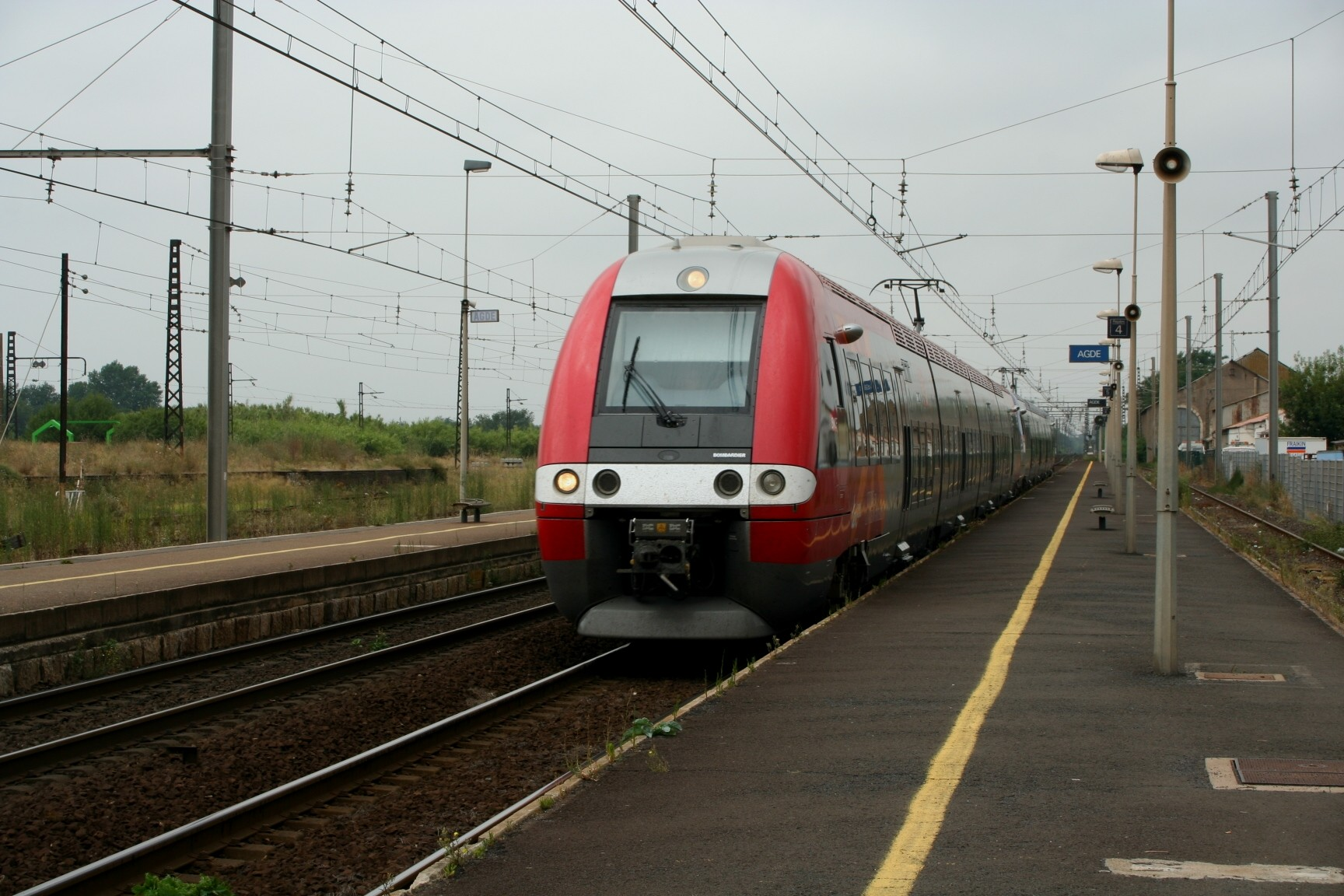
A TER train at Agde

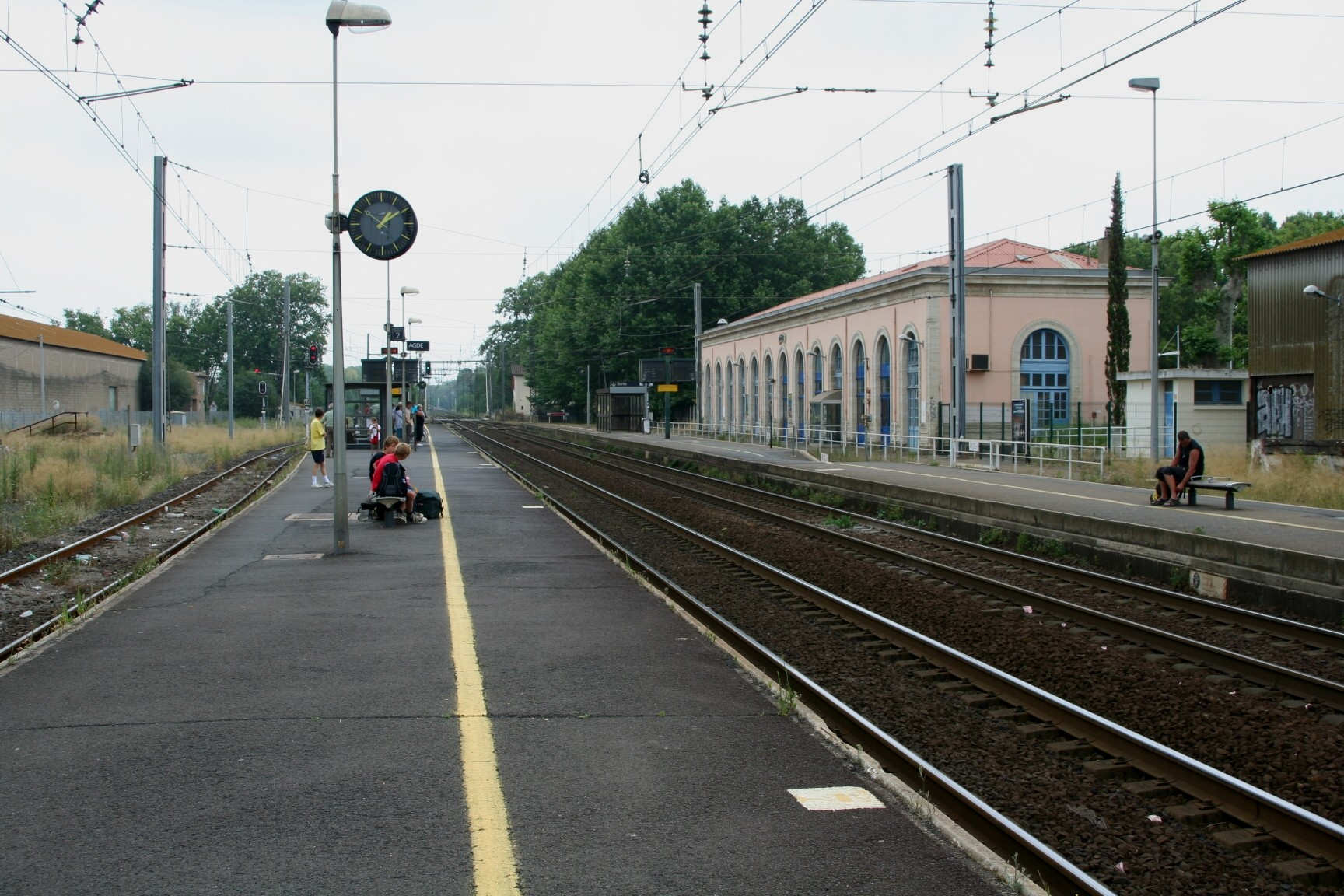
The platforms
