= Sète station =

Railway station in Sète, France

Coordinates: 43°24′46″N 3°41′46″E

Sète
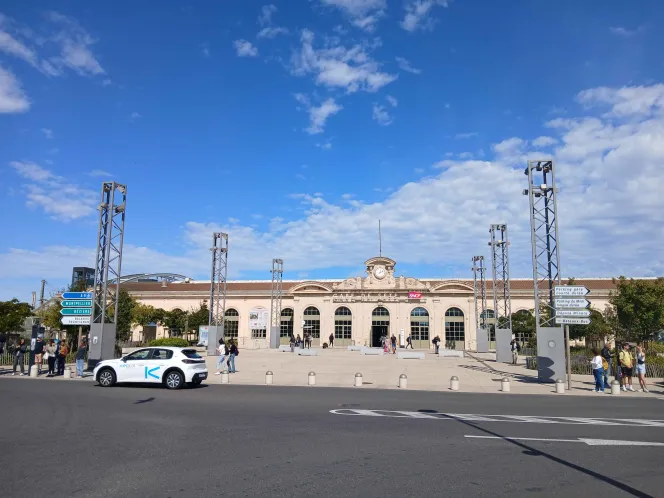
- Station building and entrance

General information
- Location: 20 Place Cambon; 34200 Sète; Hérault; France
- Owner: SNCF
- Operator: SNCF

History
- Opened: 22 April 1857

Passengers
- 2024: 1,506,642
Location

Sète station (French: Gare de Sète) is the railway station serving the town of Sète in the Hérault département of southern France. It is the eastern terminus of the Bordeaux–Sète railway.

== Train services ==
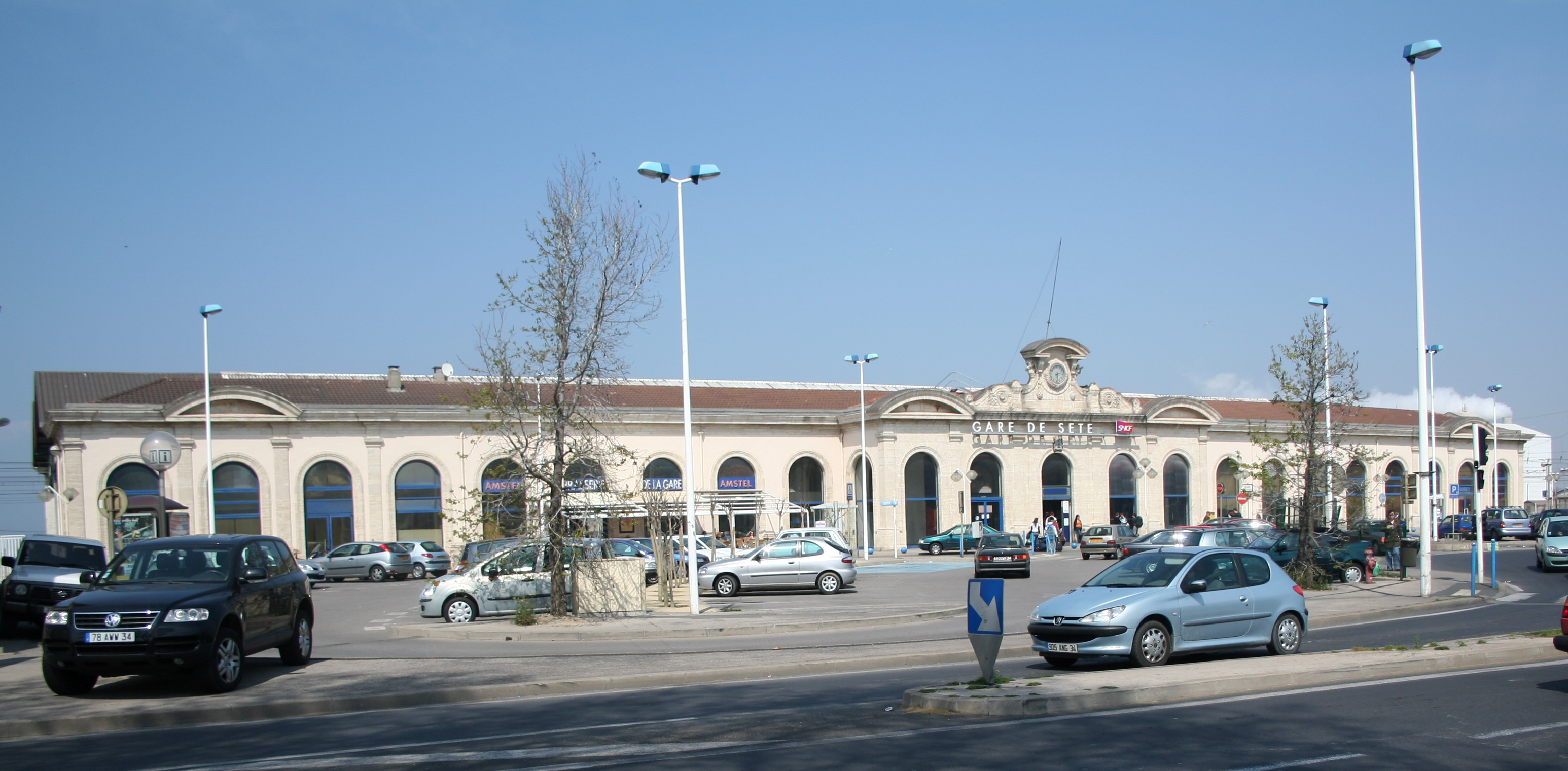
Sète station

The station is served by the following service(s):

- High-speed services (TGV) Paris–Valence–Nîmes–Montpellier (- Béziers)
- High-speed services (TGV) Paris–Lyon–Nîmes–Montpellier–Narbonne–Perpignan
- High-speed service (TGV) Paris–Valence–Nîmes–Montpellier–Perpignan–Barcelona
- Intercity services (Intercités) Bordeaux–Toulouse–Montpellier–Marseille
- Regional service (TER Occitanie) Narbonne–Béziers–Montpellier–Nîmes–Avignon
- Regional service (TER Occitanie) Cerbère–Perpignan–Narbonne–Montpellier–Nîmes–Avignon
- Regional service (TER Occitanie) Narbonne–Montpellier–Nîmes–Arles–Marseille

== See also ==
- List of SNCF stations in Occitanie

Preceding station	SNCF	Following station
Montpellier-Saint-Roch towards Paris-Lyon	TGV inOui	Agde towards Barcelona Sants
Montpellier-Saint-Roch towards Paris-Lyon	TGV inOui	Agde towards Perpignan
Montpellier-Saint-Roch towards Paris-Lyon	TGV inOui	Agde towards Béziers
Béziers towards Bordeaux	Intercités	Montpellier towards Marseille
Preceding station	TER Occitanie	Following station
Agde towards Narbonne	6	Frontignan towards Marseille
Marseillan-Plage towards Narbonne	21	Frontignan towards Avignon-Centre
Agde towards Portbou	22	Frontignan towards Avignon-Centre
