= Saint-Jory station =

Railway station in Saint-Jory, France

Saint-Jory

General information
- Location: Saint-Jory, Haute-Garonne; Occitanie, France
- Coordinates: 43°44′17″N 1°22′18″E
- Line: Bordeaux–Sète railway
- Platforms: 2
- Tracks: 2

Other information
- Station code: 87611657

Services
Preceding station	TER Occitanie	Following station
Castelnau-d'Estrétefonds towards Brive-la-Gaillarde	19	Lacourtensourt towards Toulouse
Location

Saint-Jory is a railway station located in Saint-Jory, Occitanie, France. The station is located on the Bordeaux–Sète railway. The station is served by TER (local) services operated by SNCF.

== Train services ==
As of 2022, the following services call at Saint-Jory:

- local service (TER Occitanie) Brive-la-Gaillarde–Cahors–Montauban–Toulouse
- local service (TER Occitanie) Montauban–Toulouse
