= Montpellier-Saint-Roch station =

Main railway station of Montpellier, France

Montpellier-Saint-Roch
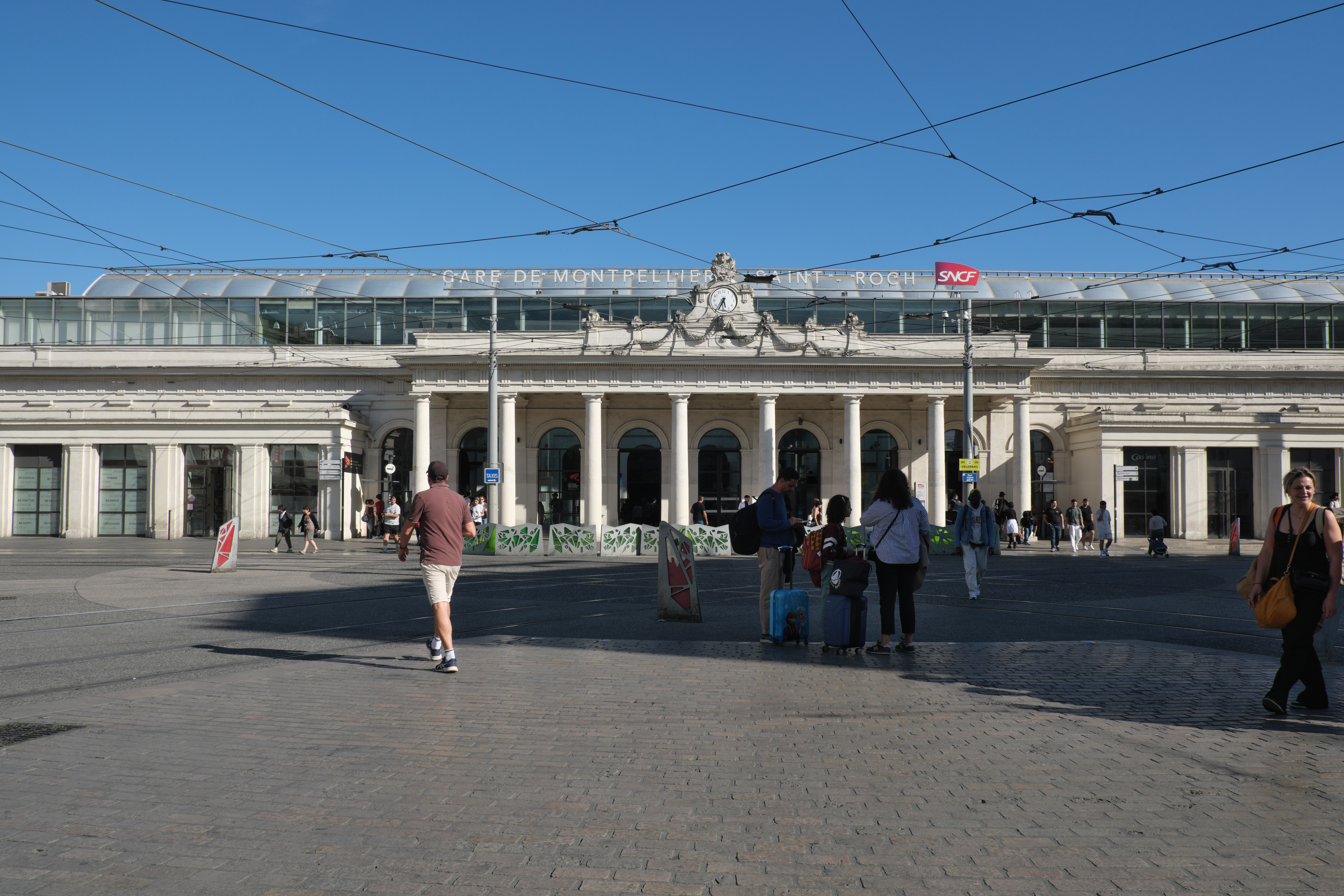
- Historic façade and newer additions, from Place Auguste Gibert, 2024

General information
- Location: Montpellier, Hérault, Occitanie, France
- Coordinates: 43°36′17″N 3°52′52″E
- Line: Tarascon–Sète railway

Other information
- Station code: 87773002

Passengers
- 2024: 7,534,414
Services
Preceding station	Renfe Operadora	Following station
Nîmes towards Marseille-St-Charles	AVE	Béziers towards Madrid Atocha
Nîmes towards Lyon-Part-Dieu	AVE	Béziers towards Barcelona Sants
Preceding station	SNCF	Following station
Nîmes towards Paris-Lyon	TGV inOui	Sète towards Barcelona Sants
Nîmes towards Paris-Lyon	TGV inOui	Sète towards Béziers
Nîmes towards Paris-Lyon	TGV inOui	Sète towards Perpignan
Nîmes towards Rennes, Luxembourg, Metz-Ville, Lille-Europe or Lille-Flandres	TGV inOui	Terminus
Nîmes towards Lyon-Part-Dieu	TGV inOui	Sète towards Toulouse
Sète towards Bordeaux	Intercités	Nîmes towards Marseille
Preceding station	Ouigo	Following station
Nîmes towards Paris-Lyon	Grande Vitesse	Terminus
Preceding station	TER Occitanie	Following station
Frontignan towards Narbonne	6	Lunel towards Marseille
Villeneuve-lès-Maguelone towards Narbonne	21	Saint-Aunès towards Avignon-Centre
Frontignan towards Portbou	22	Lunel towards Avignon-Centre
Location

Montpellier-Saint-Roch station (French: Gare de Montpellier-Saint-Roch, pronounced [ɡaʁ də mɔ̃pəlje sɛ̃ ʁɔk]) is the main railway station in Montpellier, France. The station was formerly known as Gare de Montpellier, but since March 2005 it has been named after Saint Roch, a native of the city who was born in the 14th century. Saint-Roch is one of the principal transport hubs of Languedoc-Roussillon, situated between the stations of Nîmes and Sète.

The station building comprises a listed front face and a passenger building laid out on three levels. What was the bus station above the tracks is now a short-stay car park. Since the beginning of the 2000s, the station has been in the middle of an urban regeneration project involving old railway property called the Nouveau Saint-Roch.

Until December 2013, there was a EuroCity service between Montpellier, Barcelona and Cartagena in Spain. This service was cut when high-speed services were extended to Barcelona and Madrid.

== Destinations ==
Due to its position in the south of France and on the lines from Paris and Spain, many international trains stop in Montpellier.

From Montpellier train services depart to major French cities such as: Paris, Lyon, Marseille, Perpignan, Lille, Dijon, Toulouse, Bordeaux and Besançon.

International services operate to Spain: Barcelona and Madrid.

== Train services ==
The station is served by the following services:

- High speed services (TGV)
  - Paris–Valence–Nîmes–Montpellier (– Béziers)
  - Paris–Lyon–Nîmes–Montpellier–Béziers–Narbonne–Perpignan
  - Paris–Valence–Nîmes–Montpellier–Béziers–Perpignan–Barcelona
  - Lyon–Nîmes–Montpellier–Perpignan–Barcelona
  - Lille–Paris-CDG Airport–Lyon–Nîmes–Montpellier
  - Lyon–Nîmes–Montpellier–Toulouse
- High speed services (AVE)
  - Marseille–Nîmes–Montpellier–Béziers–Perpignan–Barcelona–Saragosse–Madrid
- High speed services (TGV Ouigo)
  - Marne-la-Vallée–Lyon Saint-Exupéry–Nîmes–Montpellier
- Intercity services (Intercités)
  - Bordeaux–Toulouse–Montpellier–Nîmes–Marseille
- Regional services (TER Occitanie)
  - Narbonne–Béziers–Montpellier–Nîmes–Avignon
  - Cerbère–Perpignan–Narbonne–Montpellier–Nîmes–Avignon
  - Narbonne–Montpellier–Nîmes–Arles–Marseille

== Gallery ==
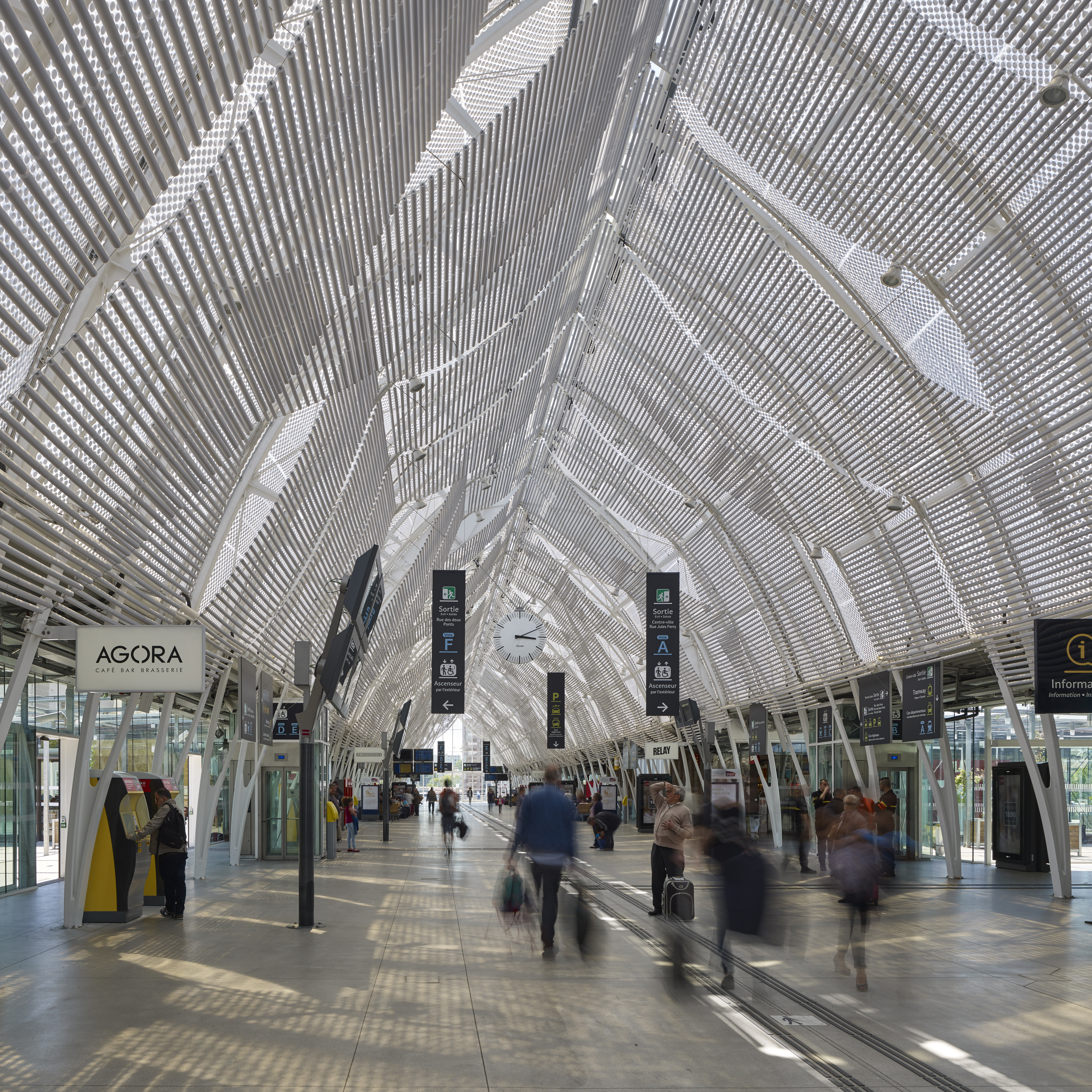
Interior of the concourse, 2016

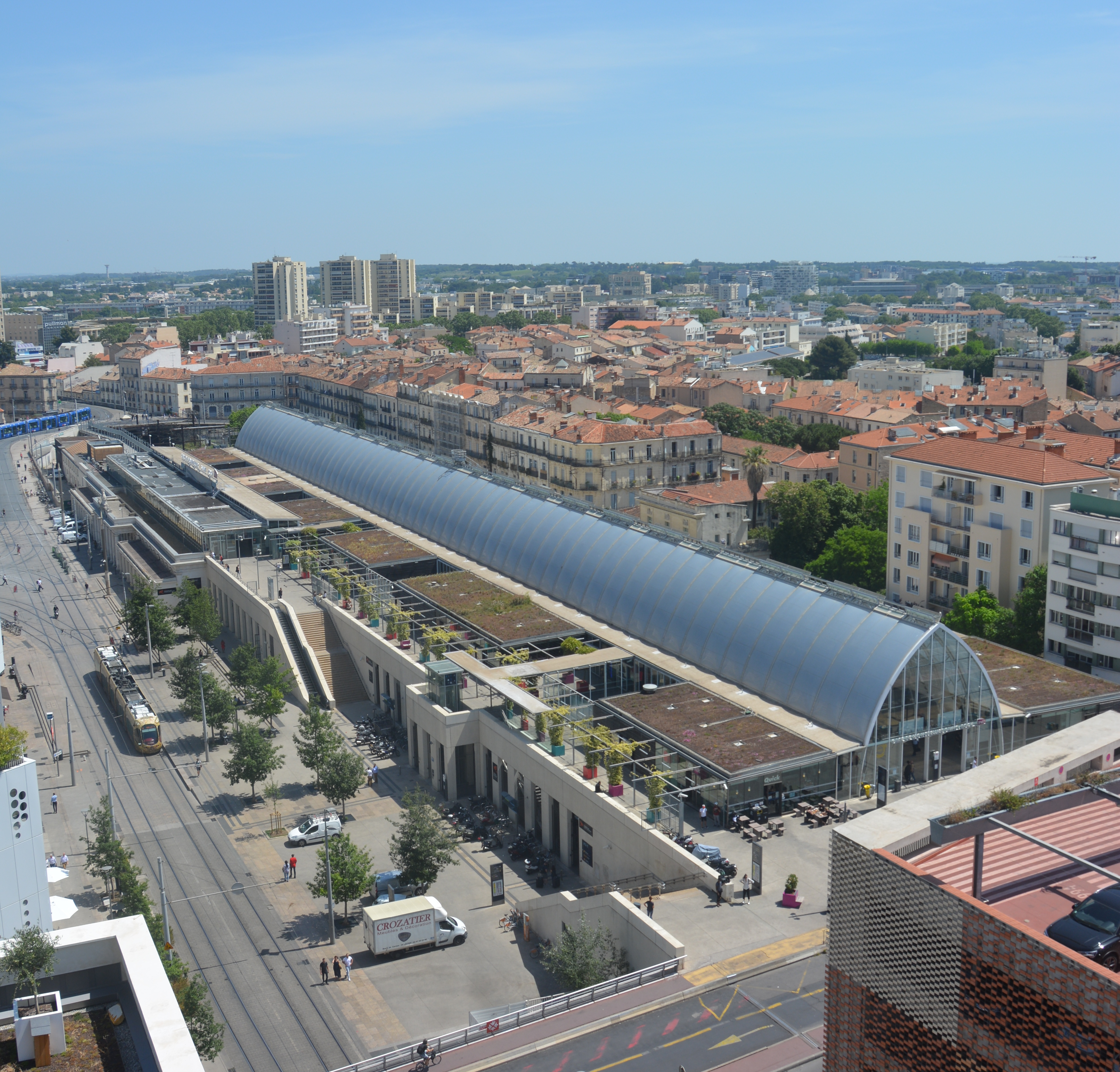
Aerial view from the west, 2022

== See also ==
- List of SNCF stations in Occitanie
