= Coursan station =

Railway station in Occitanie, France

Coursan
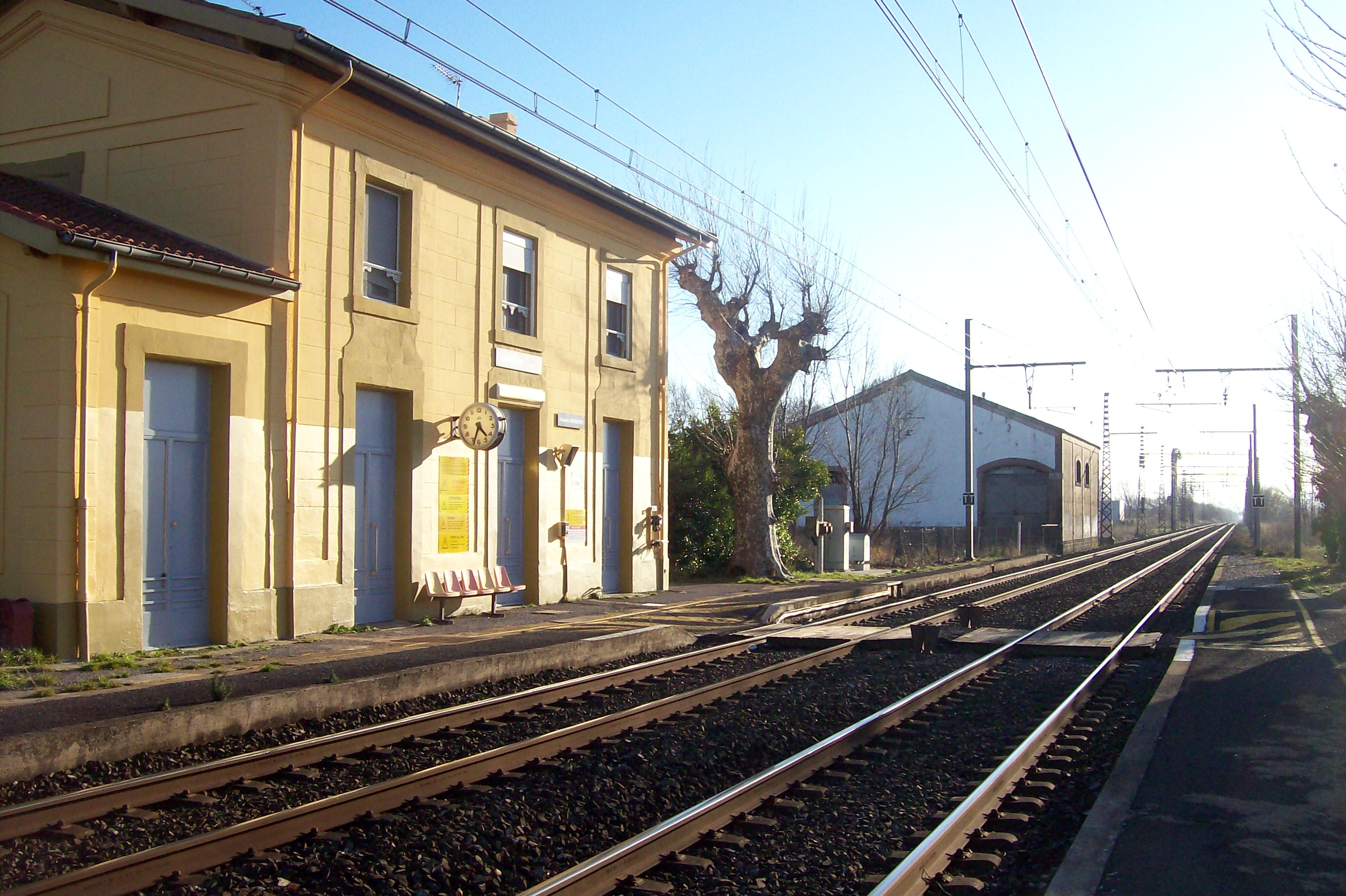
- Coursan station

General information
- Location: Coursan, Occitanie, France
- Coordinates: 43.23374°N 3.05092°E
- Line: Bordeaux–Sète railway

Other information
- Station code: 87781161

Services
Preceding station	TER Occitanie	Following station
Narbonne Terminus	21	Béziers towards Avignon-Centre
Location

Coursan is a railway station in Coursan, Occitanie, southern France. Within TER Occitanie, it is part of line 21 (Narbonne–Avignon).
