= Baraqueville–Carcenac-Peyralès station =

Railway station in France

Coordinates: 44°16′13″N 2°25′39″E

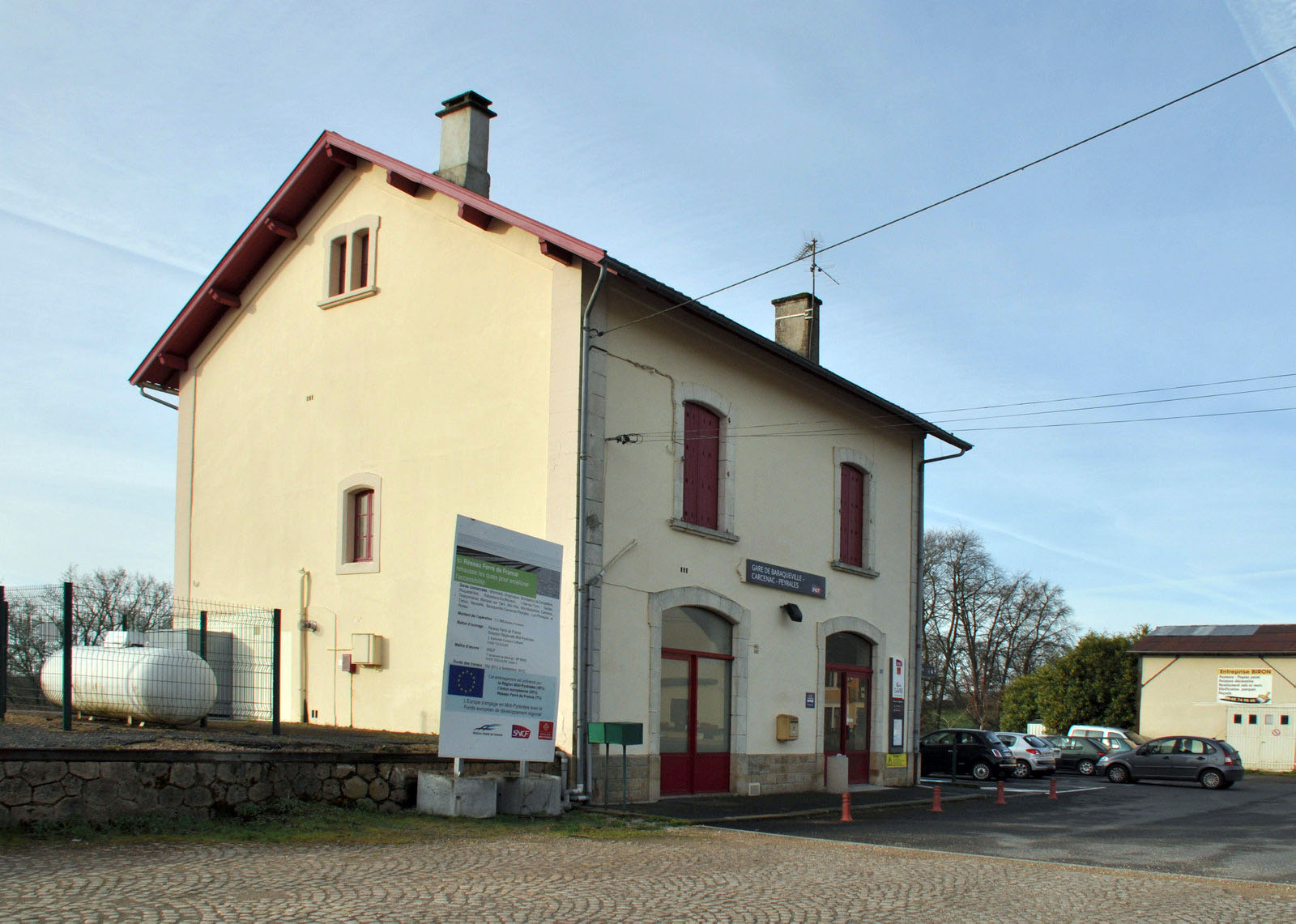
The station in 2015.

Baraqueville-Carcenac-Peyralès is a railway station that is situated in Baraqueville, Occitanie, France. Located on the Castelnaudary – Rodez railway line, the station is served by TER (local) services operated by SNCF.

== Train services ==
The following services currently call at Baraqueville:

- local service (TER Occitanie) Toulouse–Albi–Rodez

Preceding station	TER Occitanie	Following station
Naucelle towards Toulouse	2	Luc-Primaube towards Rodez
