= Vic–Mireval station =

Railway station in Mireval, France

Vic–Mireval
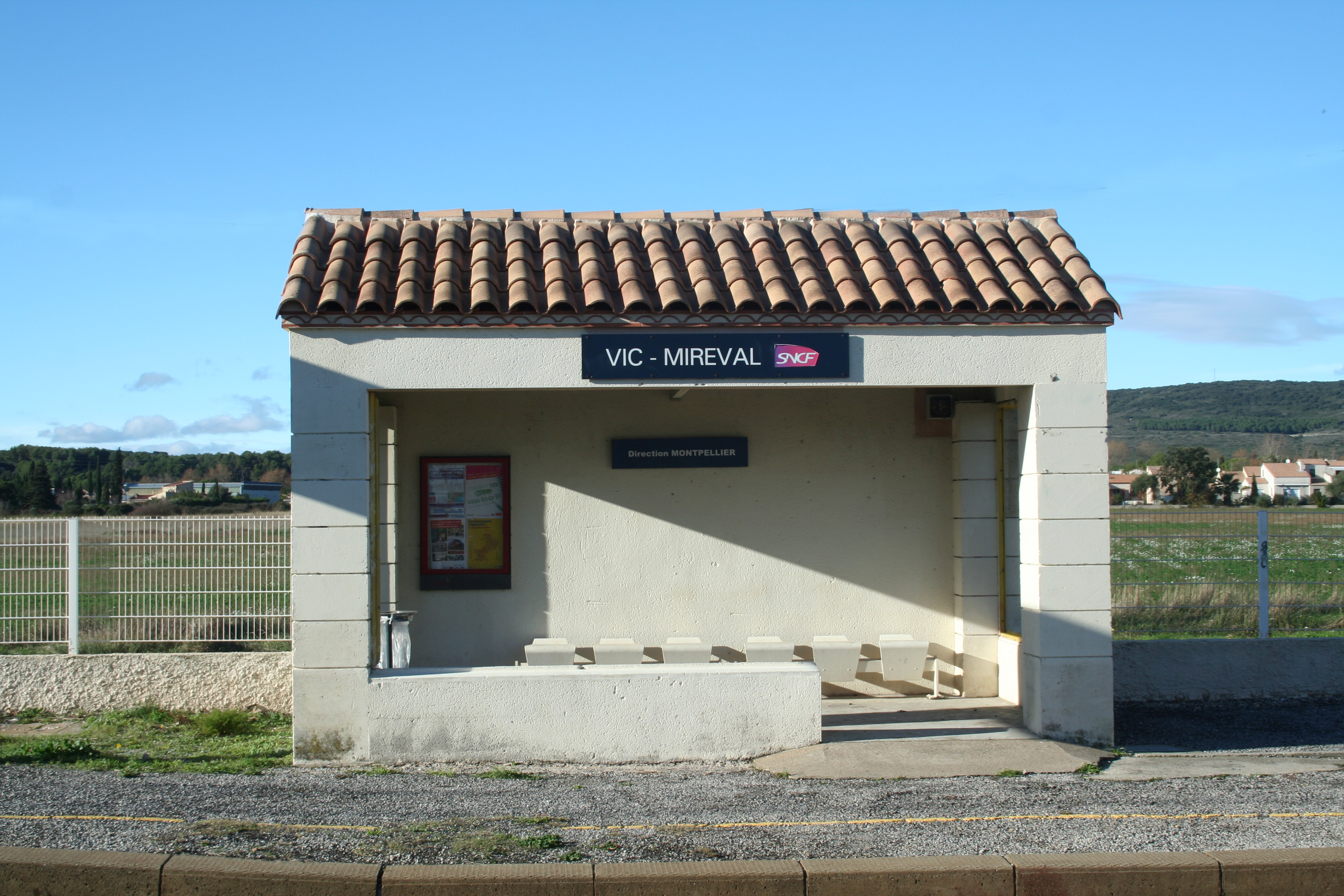
- Vic-Mireval Station

General information
- Location: Mireval, Occitanie, France
- Coordinates: 43.50071°N 3.79936°E
- Line: Tarascon–Sète railway

Other information
- Station code: 87773531

Services
Preceding station	TER Occitanie	Following station
Frontignan towards Narbonne	21	Villeneuve-lès-Maguelone towards Avignon-Centre
Location

Vic-Mireval station (French: Gare de Vic-Mireval) is a railway station in Mireval, Occitanie, southern France. Within TER Occitanie, it is part of line 21 (Narbonne–Avignon).
