= Frontignan station =

Railway station in Occitanie, France

Frontignan
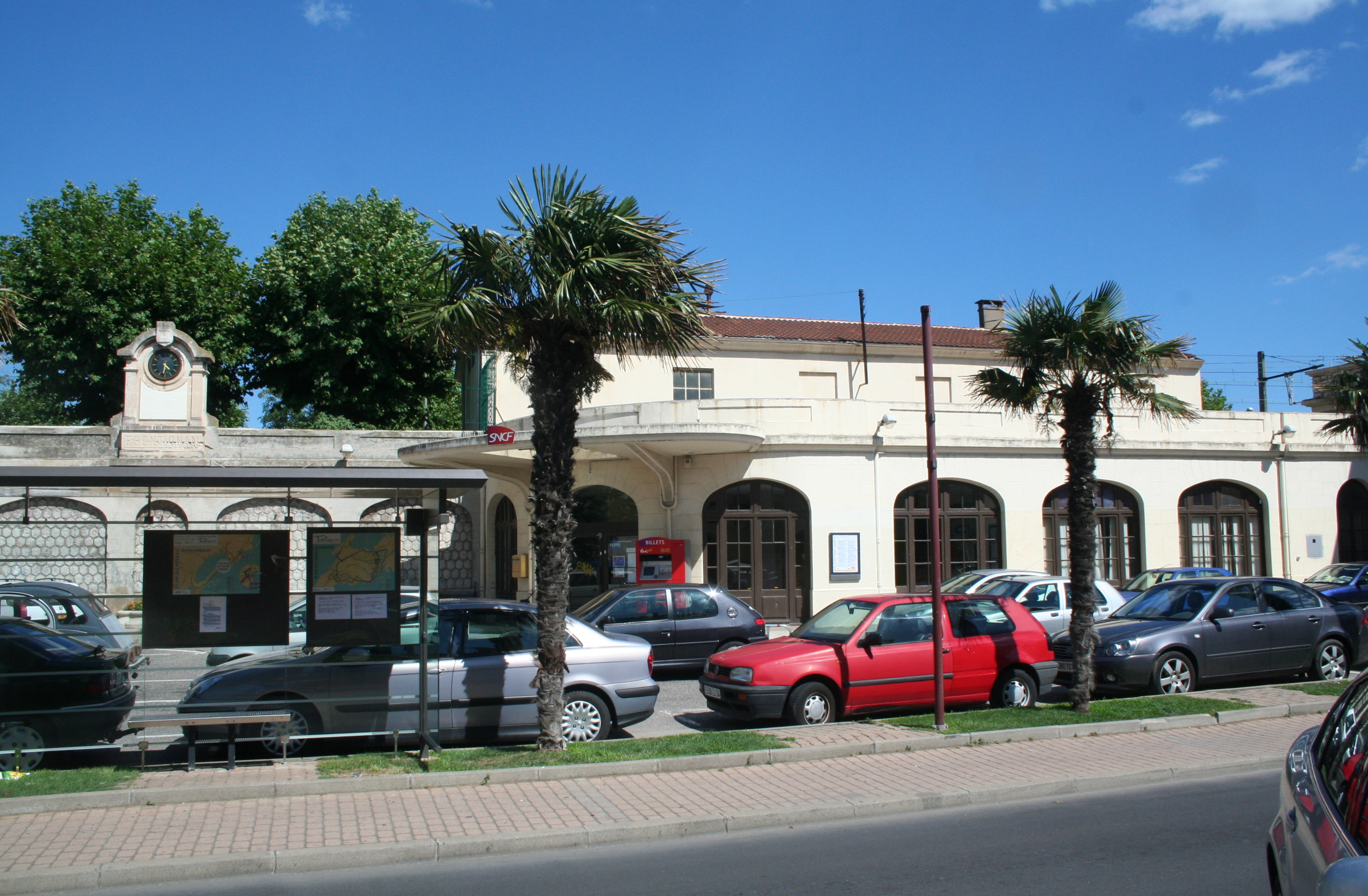
- Frontignan station

General information
- Location: Frontignan, Occitanie, France
- Coordinates: 43.44492°N 3.75891°E
- Line: Tarascon–Sète railway

Other information
- Station code: 87773556

Services
Preceding station	TER Occitanie	Following station
Sète towards Narbonne	6	Montpellier towards Marseille
Sète towards Narbonne	21	Vic–Mireval towards Avignon-Centre
Sète towards Portbou	22	Montpellier towards Avignon-Centre
Location

Frontignan is a railway station in Frontignan, Occitanie, southern France. Within TER Occitanie, it is part of lines 6 (Narbonne–Marseille), 21 (Narbonne–Avignon) and 22 (Portbou–Avignon).
