= Vauvert station =

Railway station in France

Vauvert
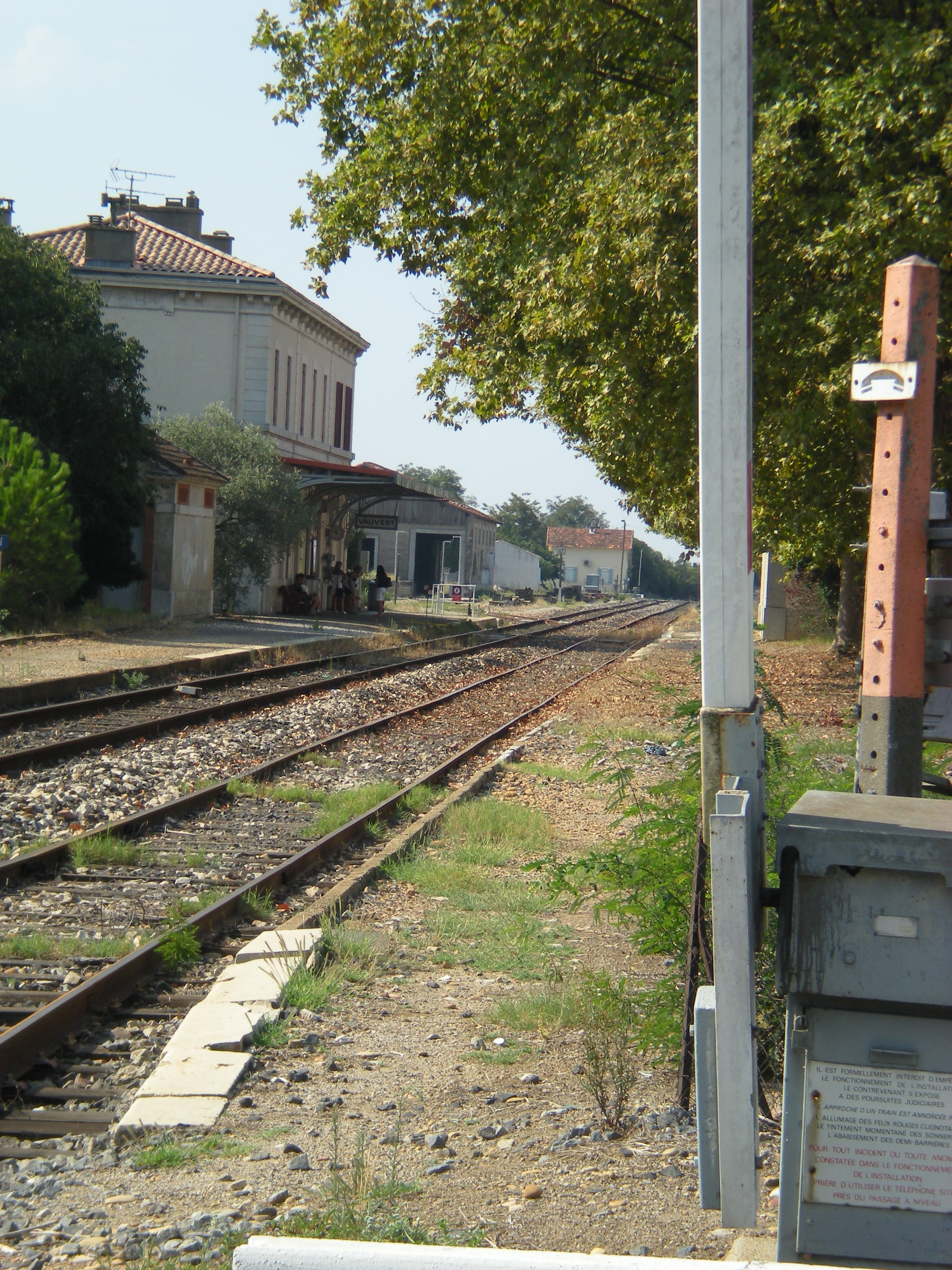
- Vauvert Station

General information
- Location: Vauvert, Occitanie, France
- Coordinates: 43.69507°N 4.27001°E
- Line: Saint-Césaire–Le Grau-du-Roi railway

Other information
- Station code: 87775817

Services
Preceding station	TER Occitanie	Following station
Beauvoisin towards Nîmes	26	Le Cailar towards Le Grau-du-Roi
Location

Vauvert is a railway station in Vauvert, Occitanie, southern France. Within TER Occitanie, it is part of line 26 (Nîmes–Le Grau-du-Roi).
