= Milhaud station =

Railway station in Milhaud, France

Milhaud
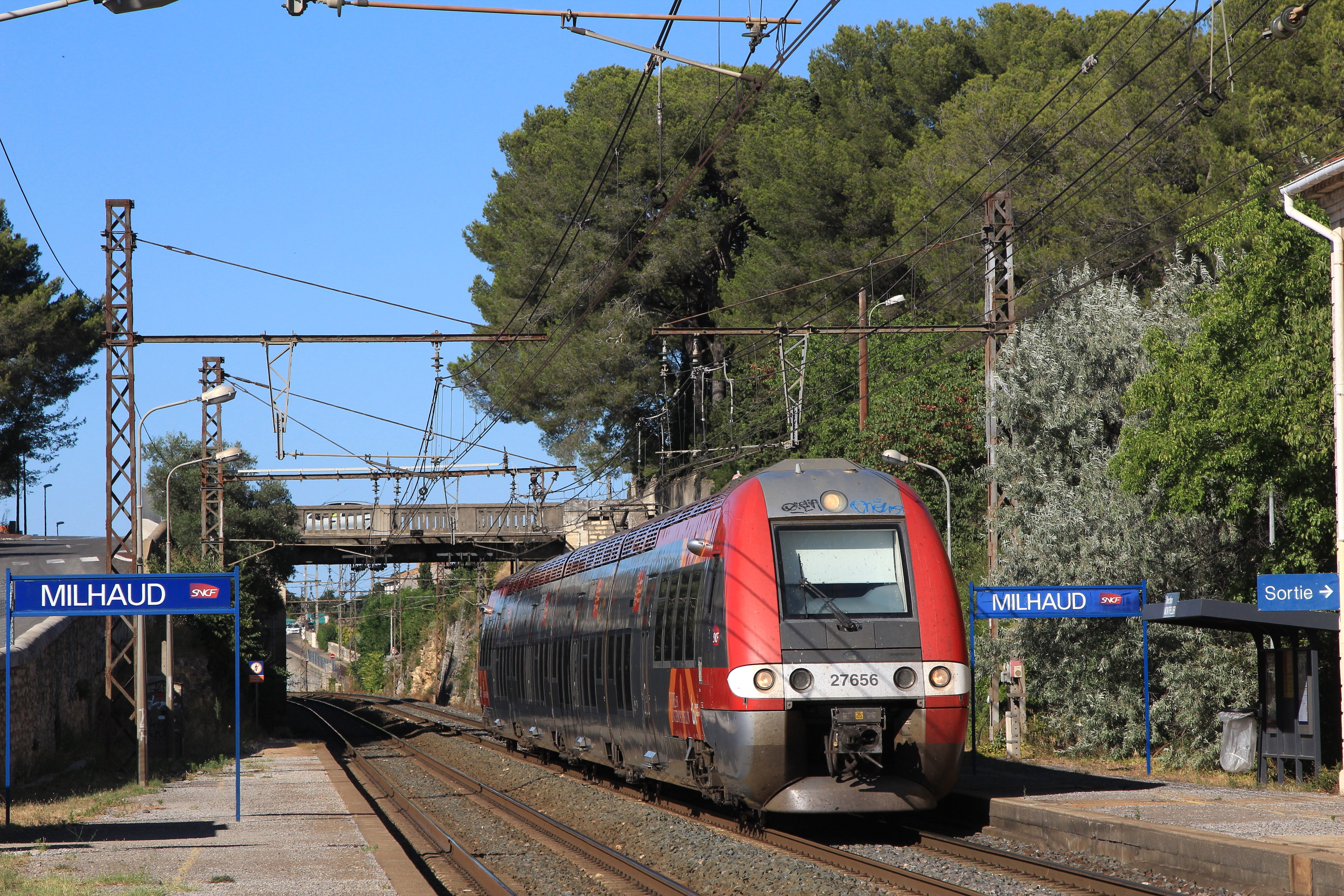
- Milhaud station

General information
- Location: Milhaud, Gard, Occitanie, France
- Coordinates: 43.78855°N 4.30323°E
- Line: Tarascon–Sète railway

Other information
- Station code: 87775098

Services
Preceding station	TER Occitanie	Following station
Uchaud towards Narbonne	21	Saint-Césaire towards Avignon-Centre
Location

Milhaud station (French: Gare de Milhaud) is a railway station in Milhaud, Gard, Occitanie, southern France. Within TER Occitanie, it is part of line 21 (Narbonne–Avignon).

The main entrance, on rue de la Gare, has the original station building and the platform for services running towards Montpellier and Narbonne. The secondary entrance from rue des Amandiers gives access directly to the platform for trains running in the direction of Nimes and Avignon.
