= Aimargues station =

Railway station in Aimargues, France

Aimargues
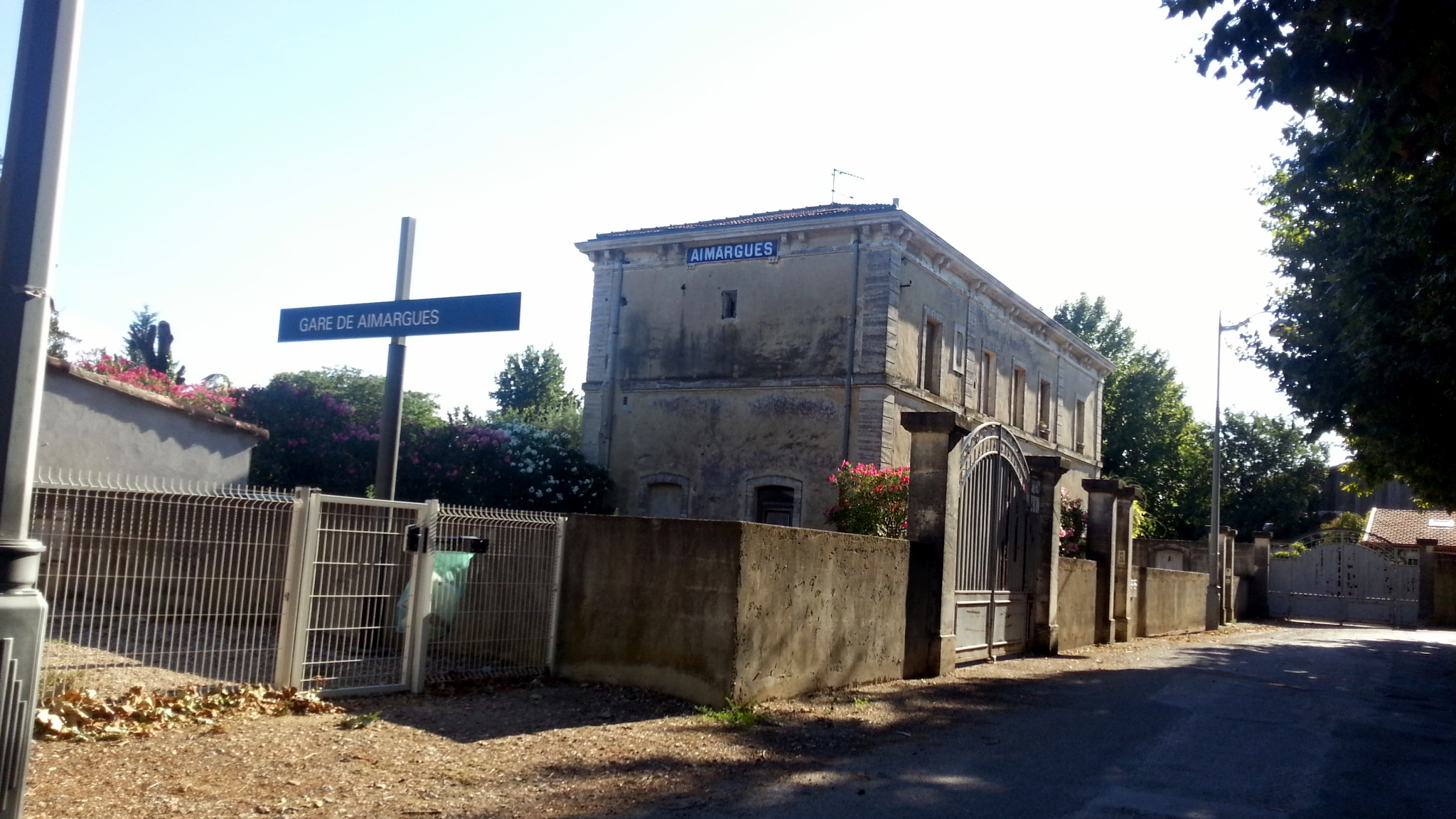
- Aimargues station

General information
- Location: Aimargues, Occitanie, France
- Coordinates: 43.67872°N 4.20875°E
- Line: Saint-Césaire–Le Grau-du-Roi railway

Other information
- Station code: 87775833

History
- Opened: 1868

Services
Preceding station	TER Occitanie	Following station
Le Cailar towards Nîmes	26	Saint-Laurent-d'Aigouze towards Le Grau-du-Roi
Location

Aimargues is a railway station in Aimargues, Occitanie, southern France. Within TER Occitanie, it is part of line 26 (Nîmes-Le Grau-du-Roi).
