= Gallargues station =

Railway station in Gallargues-le-Montueux, France

Gallargues
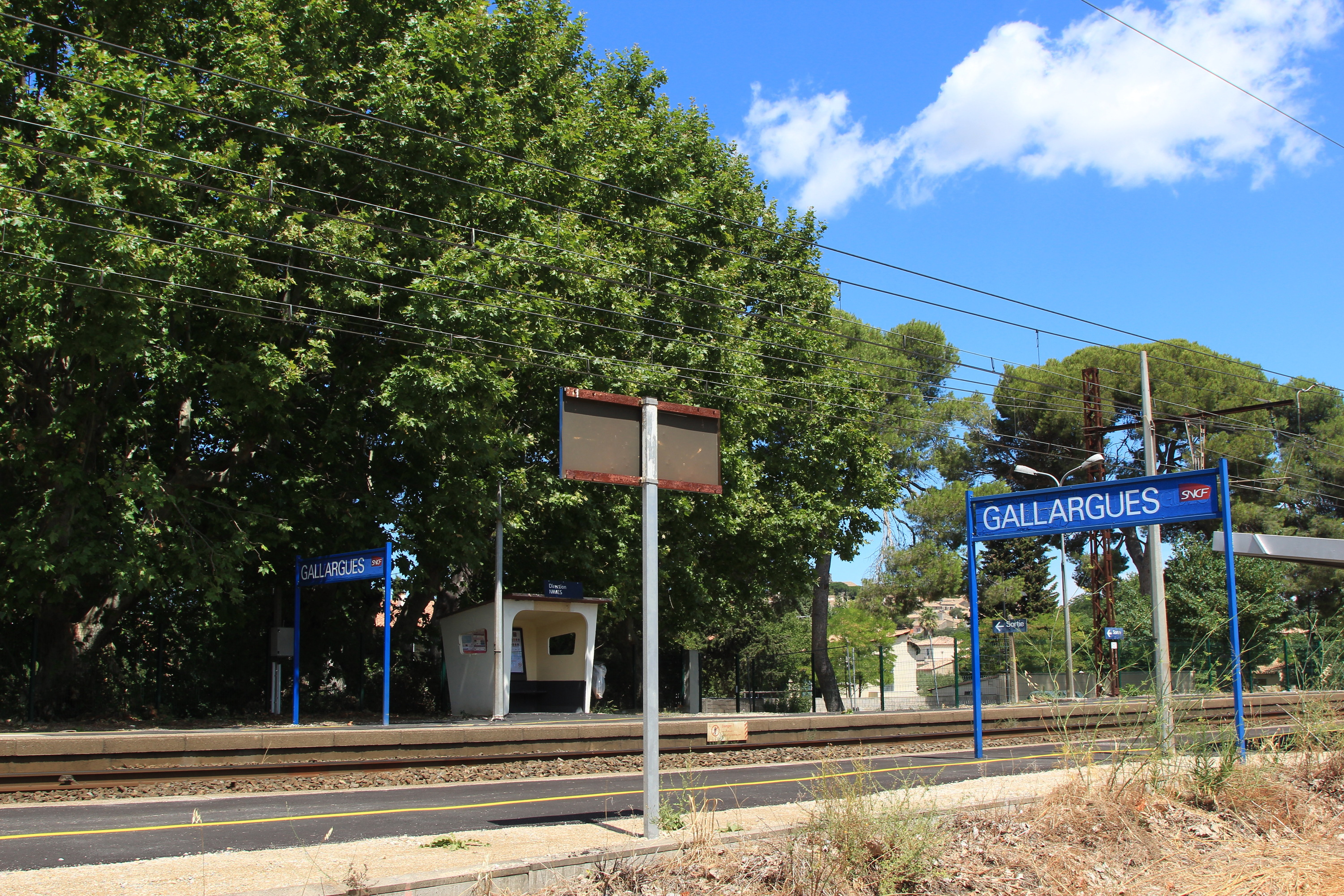
- Gallargues station

General information
- Location: Gallargues-le-Montueux, Occitanie, France
- Coordinates: 43.7161°N 4.17127°E
- Line: Tarascon–Sète railway

Other information
- Station code: 87775130

Services
Preceding station	TER Occitanie	Following station
Lunel towards Narbonne	21	Vergèze–Codognan towards Avignon-Centre
Location

Gallargues is a railway station in Gallargues-le-Montueux, Occitanie, southern France. Within TER Occitanie, it is part of line 21 (Narbonne–Avignon).
