= Naucelle station =

Railway station in Naucelle, France

Coordinates: 44°11′07″N 2°21′49″E

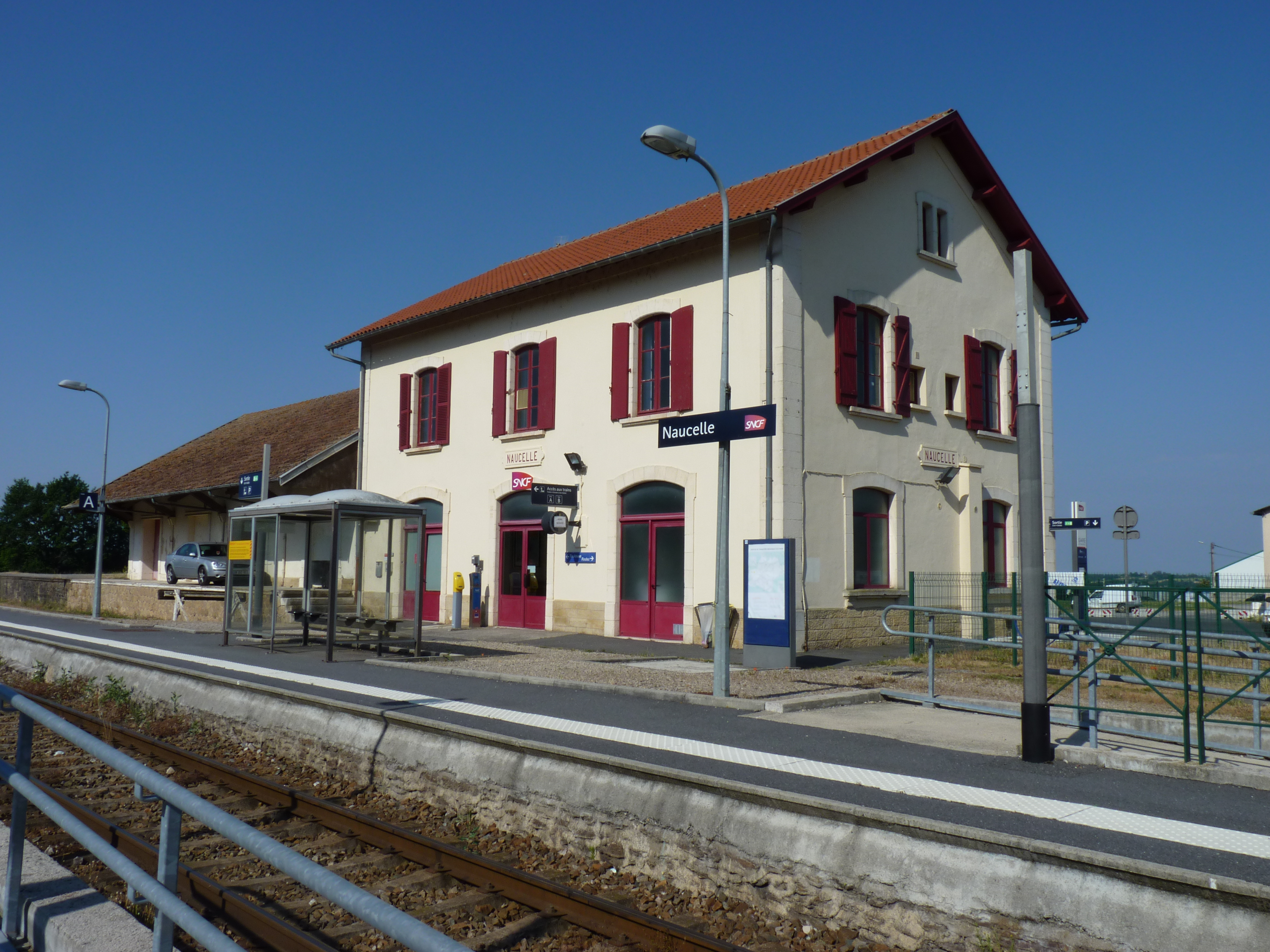
Naucelle station building

Naucelle is a railway station in Naucelle, Occitanie, which is the southernmost administrative region of France. The station is on the Castelnaudary–Rodez railway line. The station is served by TER (local) services operated by SNCF.

== Train services ==
The following services currently call at Naucelle:

- local service (TER Occitanie) Toulouse–Albi–Rodez

Preceding station	TER Occitanie	Following station
Tanus towards Toulouse	2	Baraqueville-Carcenac-Peyralès towards Rodez
