= Saint-Césaire station =

Railway station in Nîmes, France

Saint-Césaire

General information
- Location: Saint-Césaire-lès-Nîmes, Occitanie, France
- Coordinates: 43.81364°N 4.32781°E
- Lines: Tarascon–Sète railway Saint-Césaire–Le Grau-du-Roi railway

Other information
- Station code: 87775072

Services
Preceding station	TER Occitanie	Following station
Milhaud towards Narbonne	21	Nîmes towards Avignon-Centre
Nîmes Terminus	26	Générac towards Le Grau-du-Roi
Location

Saint-Césaire is a railway station in Saint-Césaire, a quarter of Nîmes, Occitanie, southern France. Within TER Occitanie, it is part of lines 21 (Narbonne–Avignon) and 26 (Nîmes-Le Grau-du-Roi).
