= Lunel-Viel station =

Railway station in Lunel-Viel, France

Lunel-Viel
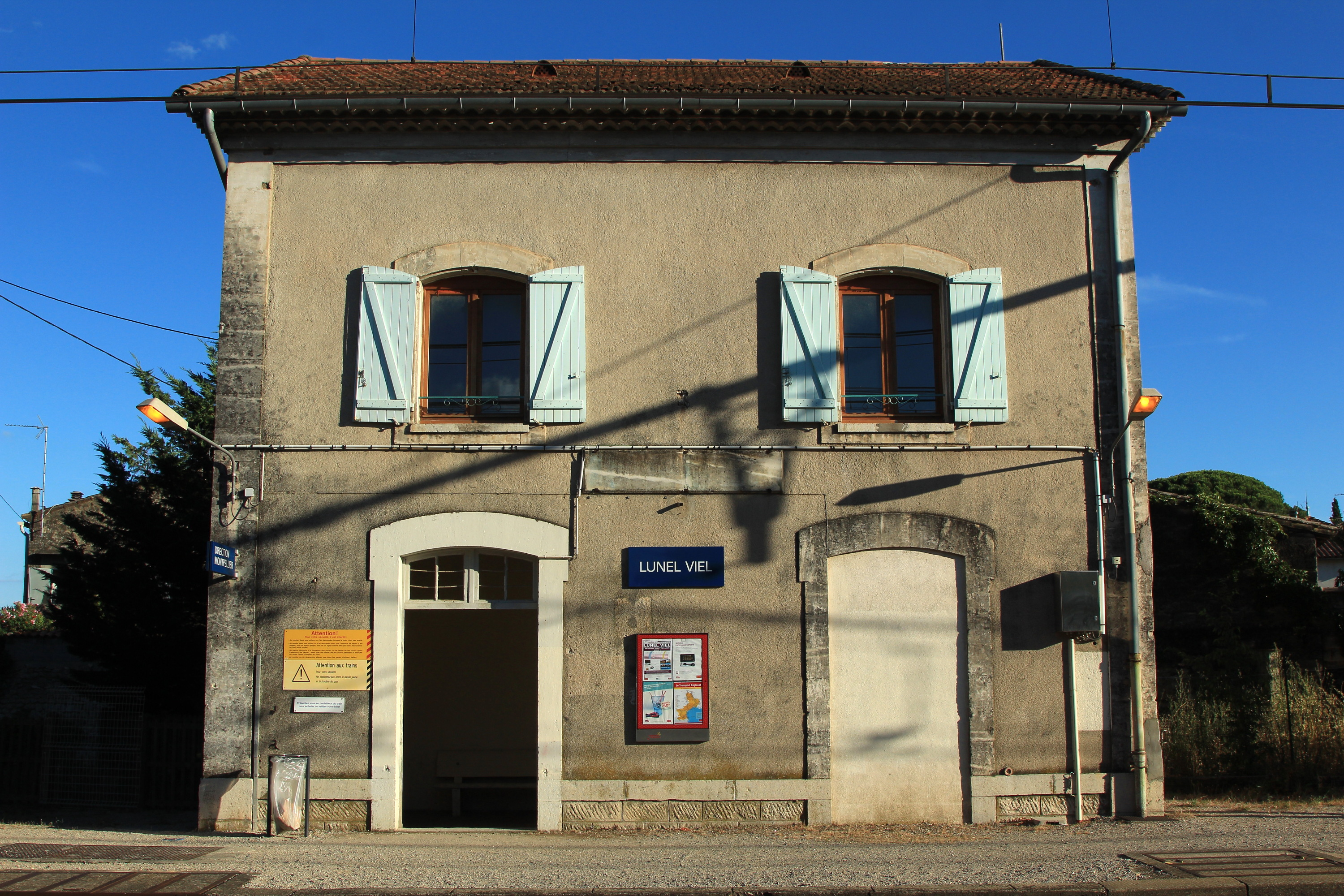
- Lunel-Viel station building

General information
- Location: Lunel-Viel, Occitanie, France
- Coordinates: 43.68114°N 4.09352°E
- Line: Tarascon–Sète railway

Other information
- Station code: 87773424

Services
Preceding station	TER Occitanie	Following station
Valergues–Lansargues towards Narbonne	21	Lunel towards Avignon-Centre
Location

Lunel-Viel is a railway station in Lunel-Viel, Occitanie, southern France. Within TER Occitanie, it is part of line 21 (Narbonne–Avignon).
