= Le Cailar station =

Railway station in Le Cailar, France

Le Cailar

General information
- Location: Le Cailar, Occitanie, France
- Coordinates: 43.68333°N 4.23485°E
- Line: Saint-Césaire–Le Grau-du-Roi railway

Other information
- Station code: 87775825

Services
Preceding station	TER Occitanie	Following station
Vauvert towards Nîmes	26	Aimargues towards Le Grau-du-Roi
Location

Le Cailar is a railway station in Le Cailar, Occitanie, southern France. Within TER Occitanie, it is part of line 26 (Nîmes-Le Grau-du-Roi).
