= Beauvoisin station =

Railway station in Beauvoisin, France

Beauvoisin

General information
- Location: Beauvoisin, Gard, Occitanie, France
- Coordinates: 43.72456°N 4.32131°E
- Line: Saint-Césaire–Le Grau-du-Roi railway

Other information
- Station code: 87775809

Services
Preceding station	TER Occitanie	Following station
Générac towards Nîmes	26	Vauvert towards Le Grau-du-Roi
Location

Beauvoisin is a railway station in Beauvoisin, Gard, Occitanie, southern France. Within TER Occitanie, it is part of line 26 (Nîmes-Le Grau-du-Roi).
