= Baillargues station =

Railway station in Baillargues, France

Baillargues
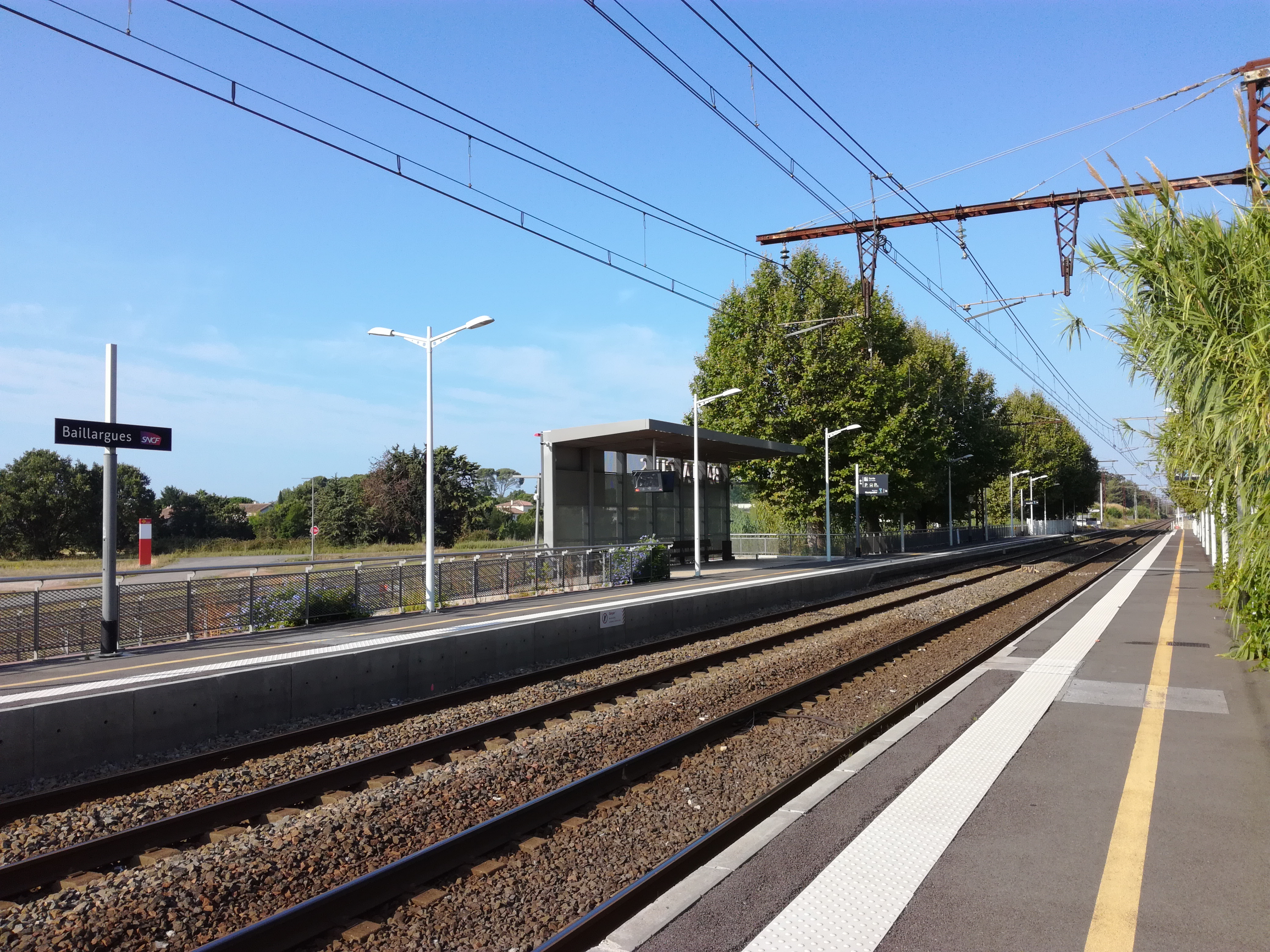
- Gare de Baillargues

General information
- Location: Baillargues, Occitanie, France
- Coordinates: 43.65327°N 4.00699°E
- Line: Tarascon–Sète railway

Other information
- Station code: 87773457

Services
Preceding station	TER Occitanie	Following station
Saint-Aunès towards Narbonne	21	Valergues–Lansargues towards Avignon-Centre
Location

Baillargues Is a railway station in Baillargues, Occitanie, southern France. Within TER Occitanie, it is part of line 21 (Narbonne–Avignon).
