= Luc-Primaube station =

Railway station in Luc-la-Primaube, France

Coordinates: 44°17′27″N 2°33′14″E

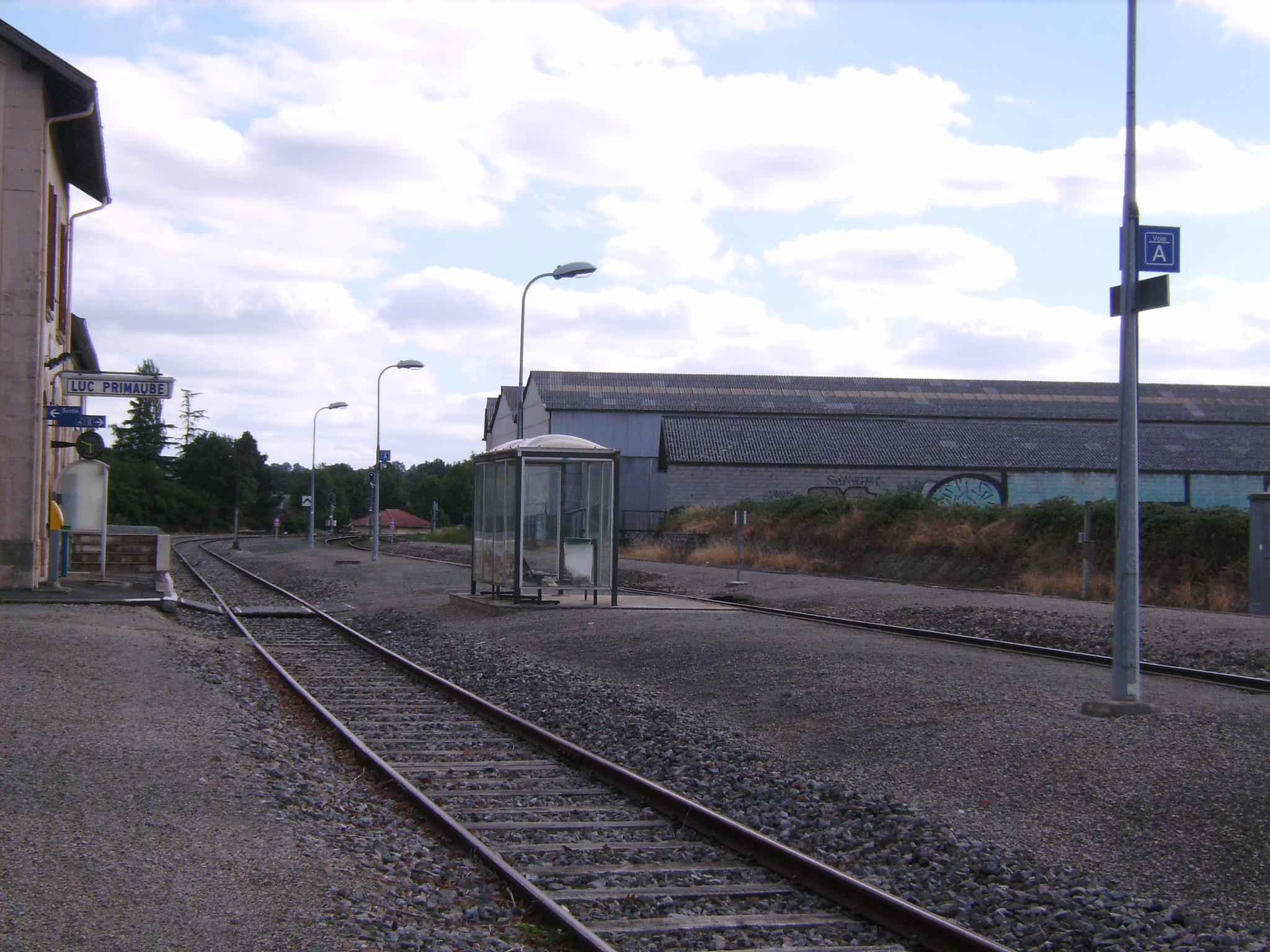
Luc-Primaube station

Luc-Primaube is a railway station in Luc-la-Primaube, Occitanie, which is the southernmost administrative region of France. The station opened in 1902 and is located on the Castelnaudary–Rodez line. The station is served by TER (local) services operated by SNCF.

== Train services ==
The following services currently call at Luc-Primaube:

- local service (TER Occitanie) Toulouse–Albi–Rodez

| Preceding station | TER Occitanie | Following station |
|---|---|---|
| Baraqueville-Carcenac-Peyralès towards Toulouse | 2 | Rodez Terminus |
