= Générac station =

Railway station in Générac, France

Générac

General information
- Location: Générac, Gard, Occitanie, France
- Coordinates: 43.73243°N 4.34337°E
- Line: Saint-Césaire–Le Grau-du-Roi railway

Other information
- Station code: 87775791

Services
Preceding station	TER Occitanie	Following station
Saint-Césaire towards Nîmes	26	Beauvoisin towards Le Grau-du-Roi
Location

Générac is a railway station in Générac, Gard, Occitanie, southern France. Within TER Occitanie, it is part of line 26 (Nîmes-Le Grau-du-Roi).
