= Alès station =

Railway station in Alès, France

Coordinates: 44°7′41″N 4°5′6″E

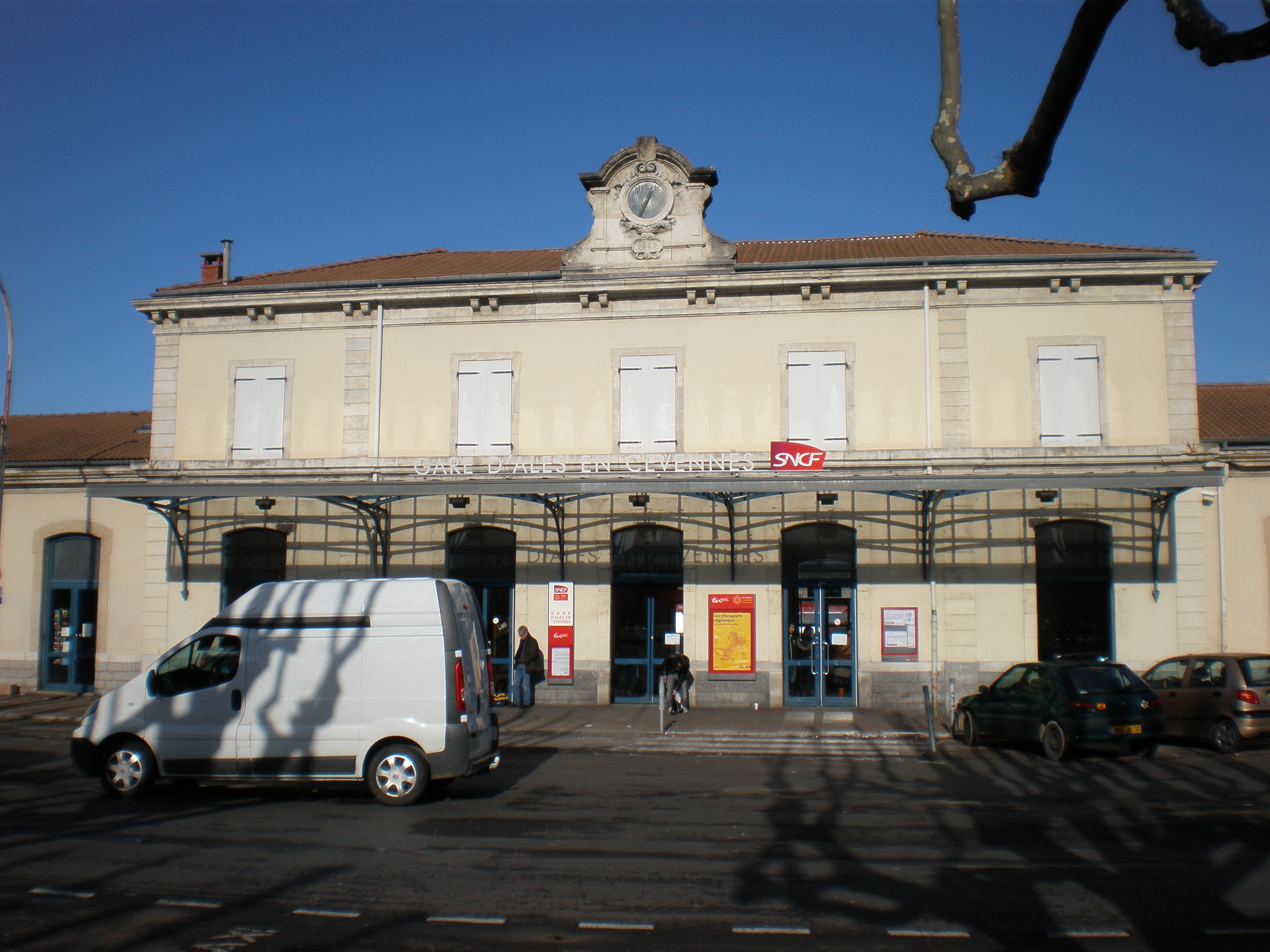
Alès station in 2009

Alès station is a railway station serving the town Alès, Gard department, southern France. It lies on the "Ligne des Cévennes" railway line from Clermont-Ferrand to Nîmes. The station is served by regional trains to Clermont-Ferrand, Mende and Nîmes.

| Preceding station | TER Occitanie | Following station |
|---|---|---|
| Grand'Combe-La Pise towards Clermont-Ferrand or Mende | 27 | Boucoiran towards Nîmes |
