= Castres station =

Railway station in Occitanie, France

Coordinates: 43°35′53″N 2°13′45″E

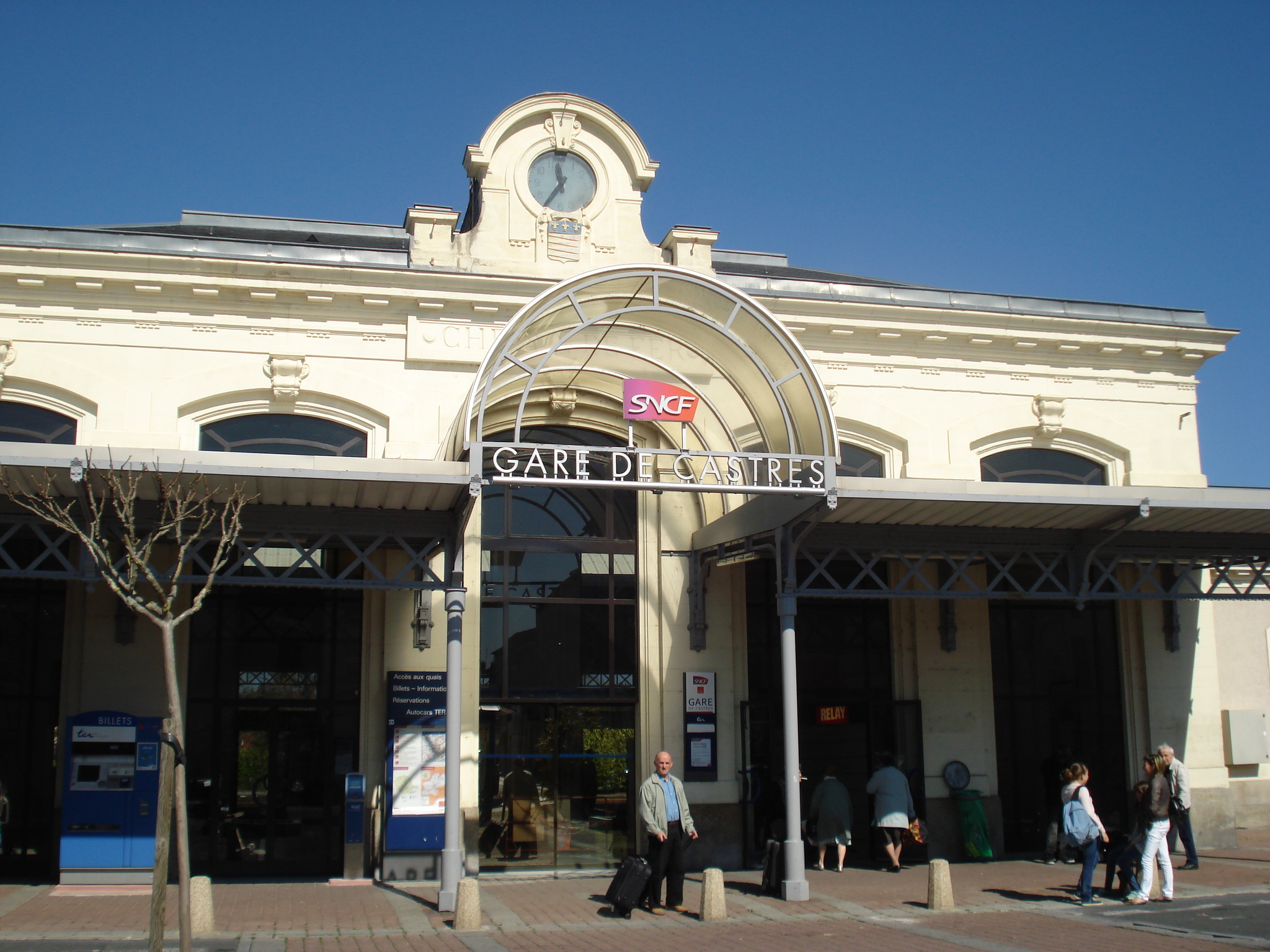
Gare de Castres

Castres is a railway station in Castres, Occitanie, France. It is on the Toulouse–Mazamet railway line. The station is served by TER (local) services operated by the SNCF. All trains have to stop at the station as it is a drive-in–reverse-out station.

== Train services ==
The following services currently call at Castres:

- local service (TER Occitanie) Toulouse–Castres–Mazamet

Preceding station	TER Occitanie	Following station
Vielmur-sur-Agout towards Toulouse	9	Labruguière towards Mazamet
