= Vergèze–Codognan station =

Railway station in Vergèze, France

Vergèze–Codognan
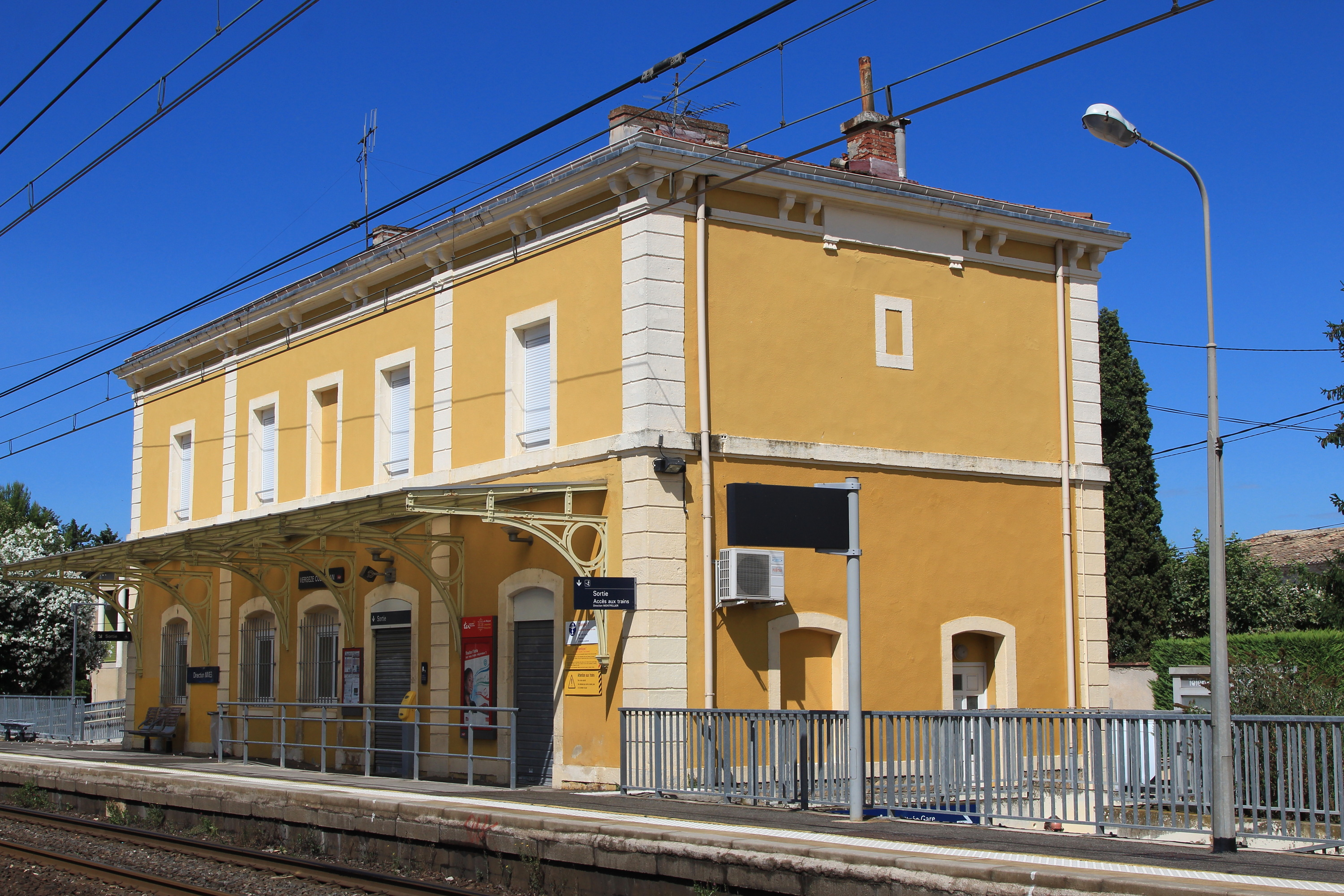
- Vergèze-Codognan station building in 2013.

General information
- Location: 6 Chemin de Vaunajol; 30310 Vergèze; Gard, France
- Coordinates: 43.73979°N 4.21894°E
- Line: Tarascon–Sète railway

Other information
- Station code: 87775114

Passengers
- 2016: 219,959

Services
Preceding station	TER Occitanie	Following station
Gallargues towards Narbonne	21	Uchaud towards Avignon-Centre
Location

Vergèze–Codognan station (French: Gare de Vergèze–Codognan) is a railway station in Vergèze, Occitanie, southern France. Within TER Occitanie, it is part of line 21 (Narbonne–Avignon).
