= Uchaud station =

Railway station in Uchaud, France

Uchaud
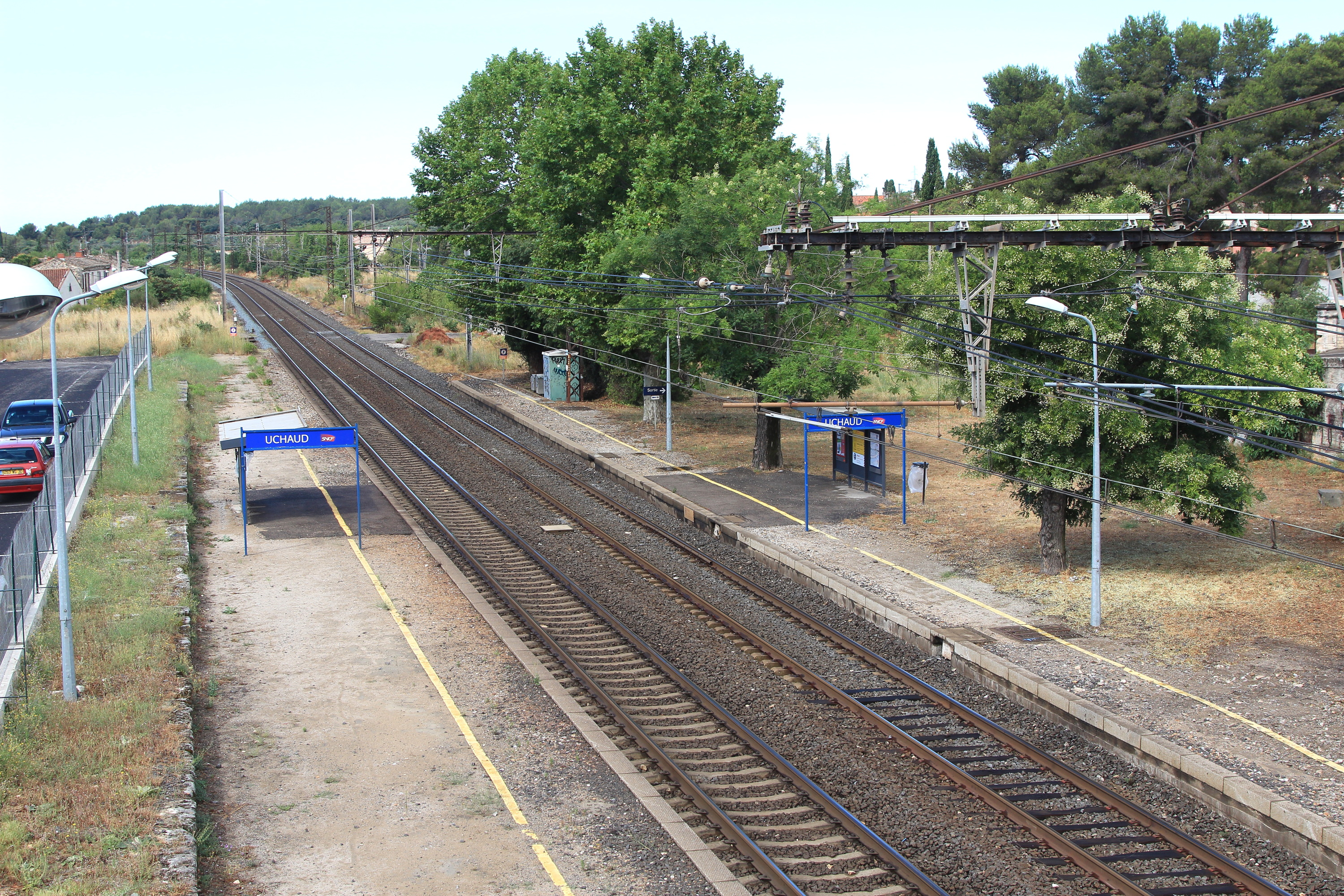

General information
- Location: Rue des Écoles; 30620 Uchaud; Gard, France
- Coordinates: 43.75798°N 4.26727°E
- Owner: SNCF
- Operator: SNCF
- Line: Tarascon–Sète railway
- Platforms: 2
- Tracks: 2

Other information
- Station code: 87775106

Services
Preceding station	TER Occitanie	Following station
Vergèze–Codognan towards Narbonne	21	Milhaud towards Avignon-Centre
Location

Uchaud station (French: Gare d'Uchaud) is a railway station in Uchaud, Occitanie, southern France. Within TER Occitanie, it is part of line 21 (Narbonne–Avignon).
