= Béziers station =

Railway station in France

Béziers
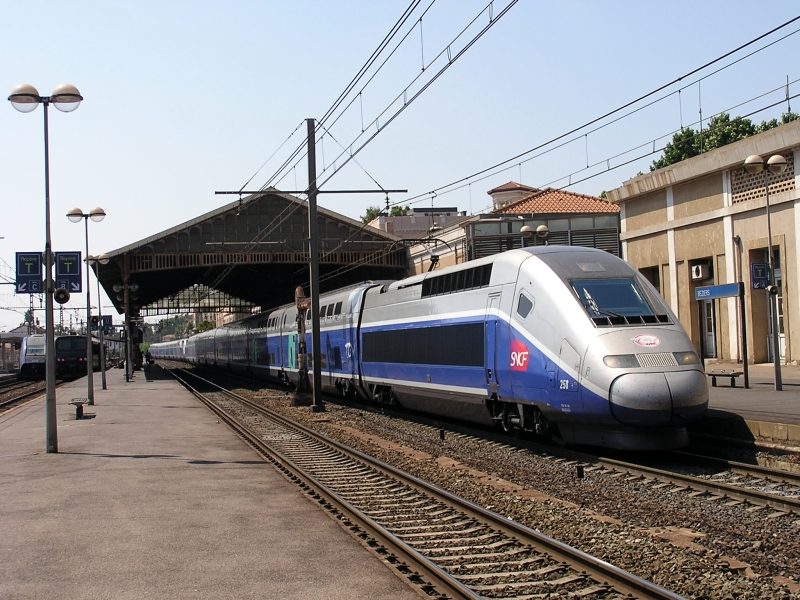
- Béziers station with a TGV Duplex in 2006.

General information
- Location: 14/14bis, boulevard de Verdun, 34500; Béziers; France
- Coordinates: 43.3363°N 3.2189°E
- Elevation: 18 m (59 ft)
- Owner: SNCF
- Operator: SNCF
- Lines: Bordeaux–Sète; Béziers–Neussargues

Other information
- Station code: 87781005

History
- Opened: 19 January 1857

Passengers
- 2024: 1,693,346
Services
Preceding station	Renfe Operadora	Following station
Montpellier-Saint-Roch towards Marseille-St-Charles	AVE	Narbonne towards Madrid Atocha
Montpellier-Saint-Roch towards Lyon-Part-Dieu	AVE	Narbonne towards Barcelona Sants
Preceding station	SNCF	Following station
Montpellier towards Paris-Lyon	TGV inOui	Narbonne towards Perpignan or Barcelona Sants
Agde towards Brussels-South	TGV inOui	Narbonne towards Perpignan
Sète towards Lyon-Part-Dieu	TGV inOui	Narbonne towards Toulouse
Narbonne towards Bordeaux	Intercités	Sète towards Marseille
Magalas towards Clermont-Ferrand	Intercités	Terminus
Preceding station	TER Occitanie	Following station
Narbonne Terminus	6	Agde towards Marseille
Coursan towards Narbonne	21	Vias towards Avignon-Centre
Narbonne towards Portbou	22	Agde towards Avignon-Centre
Magalas towards Saint-Chély-d'Apcher	28	Terminus
Location

Béziers station (French: Gare de Béziers; Occitan: Gara de Besièrs) is a French railway station that serves the town of Béziers in the Hérault département of southern France. It is on the Bordeaux–Sète railway.

== Train services ==
The station is currently served by the following services (2022):

- High-speed services
  - AVE Marseille–Nîmes–Montpellier–Perpignan–Barcelona–Madrid
  - TGV Paris–Valence–Nîmes–Montpellier–Perpignan–Barcelona
  - TGV Lyon–Nîmes–Montpellier–Perpignan–Barcelona
  - TGV Lyon–Nîmes–Montpellier–Toulouse
- Intercity services (Intercités)
  - Bordeaux–Toulouse–Montpellier–Marseille
  - Clermont-Ferrand–Millau–Béziers
- Local service (TER Occitanie)
  - Narbonne–Béziers–Montpellier–Nîmes–Avignon
  - Cerbère–Perpignan–Narbonne–Montpellier–Nîmes–Avignon
  - Narbonne–Montpellier–Nîmes–Arles–Marseille
  - Saint-Chély-d'Apcher–Marvejols–Millau–Béziers
