= LiO Train =

Regional rail network in southern France

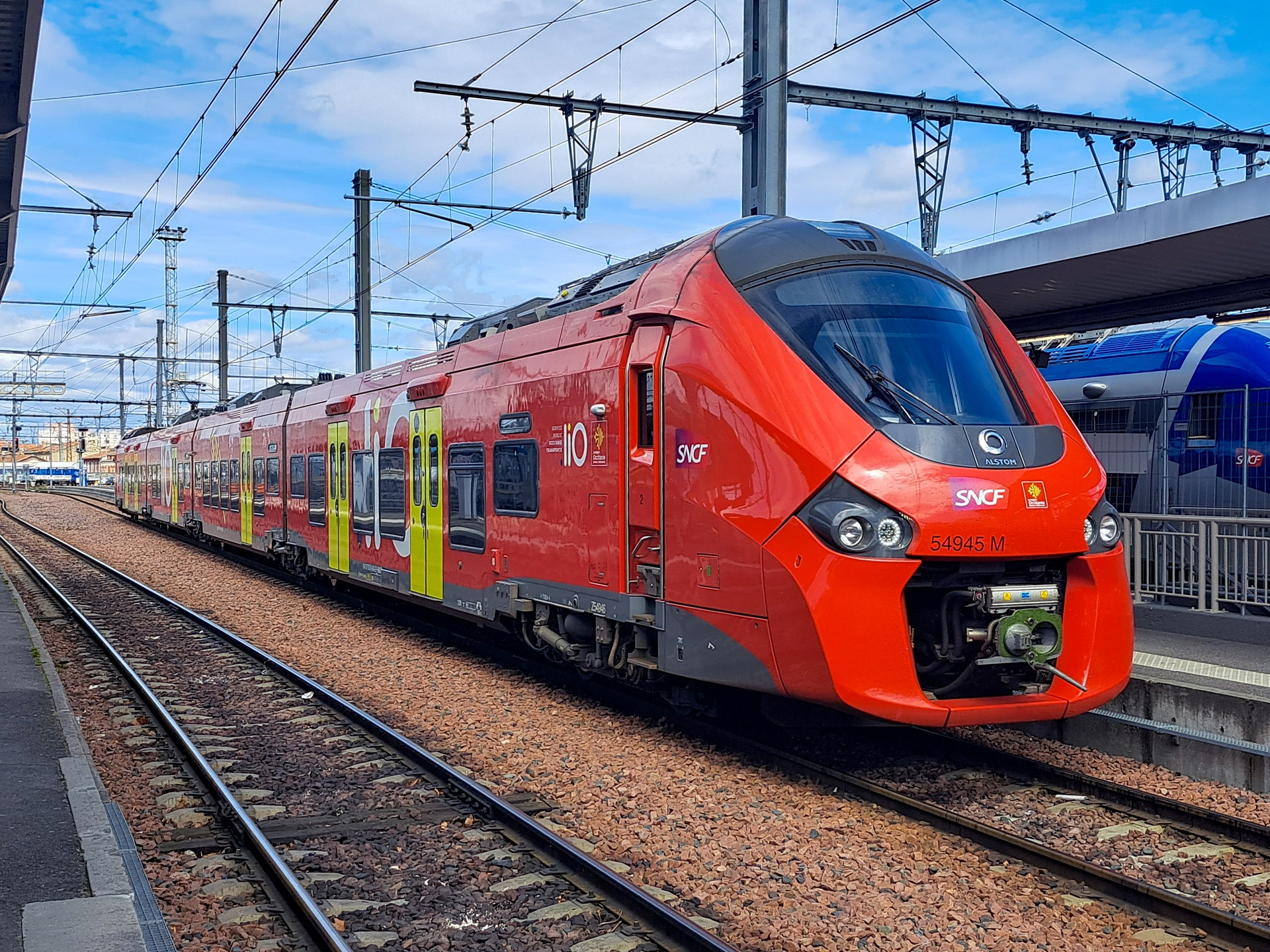
- Regiolis (Z 54900) at Toulouse-Matabiau.

Overview
- Owner: SNCF
- Area served: Occitanie, France
- Transit type: TER
- Number of lines: 63
- Number of stations: 274
- Daily ridership: 63,000
- Website: ter.sncf.com/occitanie

Operation
- Began operation: 1 July 2017
- Operator: SNCF

liO Train is the regional rail network organized since 2017 by the region of Occitanie, southern France. All lines are currently operated by the French national railway company SNCF, which also refers to this network as Train liO Occitanie, liO Train Occitanie, or TER liO Occitanie / TER Occitanie after its traditional commercial name TER (Trains Express Regional). The liO Train network was formed in 2017 as a merger of the previous networks TER Languedoc-Roussillon and TER Midi-Pyrénées, after the respective regions had also been merged.

== Network ==
Rail transport infrastructure map of Occitanie, showing main stations, number of tracks, power source and maximum speed.

The rail and bus network as of May 2022:

=== Rail ===
Line	Route
2 (1)	Toulouse-Matabiau – Montrabé† – Gragnague† – Montastruc-la-Conseillère† – Roqueserière-Buzet† – Saint-Sulpice – Rabastens-Couffouleux† – Lisle-sur-Tarn – Gaillac – Tessonnières† – Marssac-sur-Tarn† – Albi-Ville – Albi-Madeleine – Carmaux – Tanus† – Naucelle – Baraqueville – Luc-Primaube – Rodez
3	Toulouse-Matabiau – Saint-Sulpice – Lisle-sur-Tarn – Gaillac – Cordes-Vindrac – Lexos – Laguépie – Najac – Villefranche-de-Rouergue – Salles-Courbatiès – Capdenac – Figeac – Bagnac – Maurs – Boisset† – Le Rouget – Pers† – Lacapelle-Viescamp† – Ytrac† – Aurillac
6	Narbonne – Béziers – Agde – Sète – Frontignan† – Montpellier-Saint-Roch – Lunel† – Nîmes – Tarascon – Arles – Saint-Martin-de-Crau – Miramas – Vitrolles-Aéroport-Marseille-Provence – Marseille-Saint-Charles
7	Brive-la-Gaillarde – Turenne† – Les Quatre-Routes† – Saint-Denis-près-Martel – Rocamadour-Padirac – Gramat – Assier – Figeac – Capdenac – Viviez-Decazeville – Aubin – Cransac – Saint-Christophe – Rodez
9	Toulouse-Matabiau – Montrabé – Montastruc-la-Conseillère – Saint-Sulpice – Les Cauquillous – Lavaur – Damiatte-Saint-Paul – Vielmur-sur-Agout – Castres – Labruguière – Mazamet
10	Narbonne – Lézignan-Corbières – Carcassonne – Bram – Castelnaudary – Avignonet† – Villefranche-de-Lauragais – Villenouvelle† – Baziège – Montlaur† – Escalquens† – Labège-Village† – Labège-Innopole – Montaudran† – Toulouse-Matabiau
11	Toulouse-Matabiau – Toulouse-Saint-Agne – Portet-Saint-Simon – Pins-Justaret† – Venerque-le-Vernet† – Auterive – Cintegabelle – Saverdun – Le Vernet-d'Ariège – Pamiers – Varilhes – Saint-Jean-de-Verges† – Foix – Tarascon-sur-Ariège – Les Cabannes – Luzenac-Garanou – Ax-les-Thermes – Mérens-les-Vals – Andorre-L'Hospitalet – Porté-Puymorens – Latour-de-Carol-Enveitg
14	(Toulouse-Matabiau ...) Montréjeau-Gourdan-Polignan ... Luchon
15 (12)	Toulouse-Matabiau – Toulouse-Saint-Agne – Portet-Saint-Simon† – Muret – Le Fauga† – Longages-Noé† – Carbonne† – Cazères† – Martres-Tolosane† – Boussens – Saint-Martory† – Saint-Gaudens – Montréjeau-Gourdan-Polignan – Lannemezan – Capvern† – Tournay – Tarbes – Lourdes – Coarraze-Nay – Pau
16	Toulouse-Matabiau – Toulouse-Saint-Agne – Gallieni-Cancéropôle† – Toulouse-Saint-Cyprien-Arènes – Le TOEC† – Lardenne† – Saint-Martin-du-Touch† – Les Ramassiers† – Colomiers – Colomiers-Lycée International – Pibrac – Brax-Léguevin – Mérenvielle† – L'Isle-Jourdain – Gimont-Cahuzac – Aubiet – Auch
18	Agen – Lamagistère – Valence-d'Agen – Moissac – Castelsarrasin – La Ville-Dieu – Montauban-Ville-Bourbon – Castelnau-d'Estrétefonds – Toulouse-Matabiau
19 (17)	Brive-la-Gaillarde – Gignac-Cressensac† – Souillac – Gourdon – Dégagnac† – Cahors – Lalbenque-Fontanes† – Caussade – Albias† – Montauban-Ville-Bourbon – Montbartier† – Dieupentale† – Grisolles† – Castelnau-d'Estrétefonds – Saint-Jory† – Lacourtensourt† – Toulouse-Matabiau
21	Narbonne - Coursan - Béziers - Vias - Agde - Marseillan-Plage - Sète - Frontignan - Vic-Mireval - Villeneuve-lès-Maguelone - Montpellier-Saint-Roch - Saint-Aunès - Baillargues - Valergues-Lansargues - Lunel-Viel - Lunel – Gallargues – Vergèze-Codognan – Uchaud – Milhaud – Saint-Césaire – Nîmes-Centre – Nîmes-Pont-du-Gard – Beaucaire – Tarascon – Avignon-Centre
22	(Spain) Portbou – Cerbère – Perpignan – Narbonne – Béziers – Agde – Sète – Frontignan – Montpellier-Saint-Roch – Lunel – Nîmes – Nîmes-Pont-du-Gard – Tarascon – Avignon-Centre
23	(Spain) Portbou – Cerbère ... Perpignan ... Narbonne
24	Villefranche–Vernet-les-Bains ... Perpignan
25	(Spain) Portbou – Cerbère ... Perpignan ... Narbonne ... Toulouse-Matabiau
26	Nîmes – Saint-Césaire – Générac – Beauvoisin – Vauvert – Le Cailar – Aimargues – Saint-Laurent-d'Aigouze – Aigues-Mortes – Le Grau-du-Roi
27	Clermont-Ferrand ... Brioude ... Langeac ... La Bastide–Saint-Laurent-les-Bains ... Génolhac ... Alès ... Nîmes branch line: Mende ... La Bastide–Saint-Laurent-les-Bains
28	Béziers ... Bédarieux ... Millau ... Sévérac-le-Château ... Marvejols ... Saint-Chély-d'Apcher
29	Carcassonne – Couffoulens-Leuc – Verzeille – Pomas – Limoux-Flassian – Limoux
32	Latour-de-Carol-Enveitg – Enveitg-Village-Béna-Fanès – Ur-Les Escaldes – Bourg-Madame – Osséja – Sainte-Léocadie – Err – Saillagouse – Estavar – Font-Romeu-Odeillo-Via – Bolquère-Eyne – Mont-Louis-La Cabanasse – Planès – Sauto – Fontpédrouse-Saint-Thomas-les-Bains – Thuès-Carança – Thuès-les-Bains – Nyer – Olette-Canaveilles-les-Bains – Joncet – Serdinya – Villefranche–Vernet-les-Bains
† Not all trains call at this station

=== Bus ===
- 8: Rodez – Laissac – Sévérac-le-Château – Millau
- 13: Longages-Noé – Saint-Sulpice-sur-Lèze
- 14: Montréjeau-Gourdan-Polignan – Luchon

== See also ==
- Réseau Ferré de France
- List of SNCF stations in Occitanie
