= Bordeaux–Sète railway =

Railway line in southern France

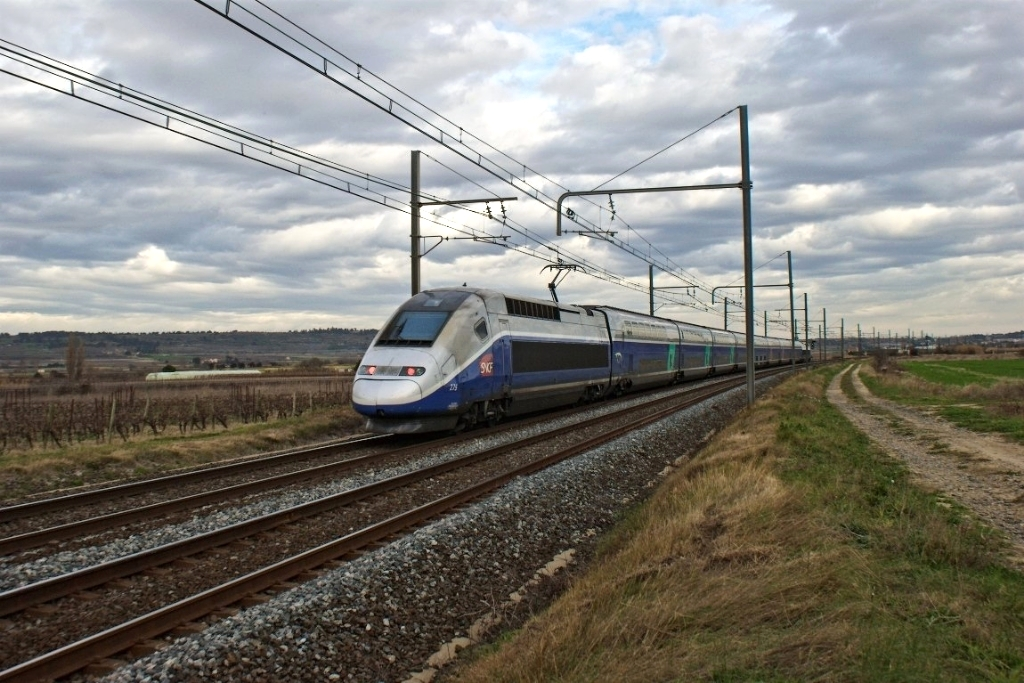

Overview
- Status: Operational
- Owner: RFF
- Locale: France (Nouvelle-Aquitaine, Occitanie)
- Termini: Bordeaux-Saint-Jean station; Sète station

Service
- System: SNCF
- Operator(s): SNCF

History
- Opened: 1855-1858

Technical
- Line length: 476 km (296 mi)
- Number of tracks: Double track
- Track gauge: 1,435 mm (4 ft 8 1/2 in) standard gauge
- Electrification: 1.5 kV DC

The railway from Bordeaux to Sète is an important French 476-kilometre long railway line, that connects the southwestern port city Bordeaux (on the Bay of Biscay) to the southern port Sète (on the Mediterranean) via Toulouse and Narbonne. The railway was opened in several stages between 1855 and 1858.

== Route ==
The Bordeaux–Sète railway leaves the Bordeaux-Saint-Jean station in southeastern direction, following the river Garonne upstream on its left bank. It crosses the Garonne at Langon, and continues upstream along the right Garonne bank in eastern direction, turning southeast near La Réole. It crosses the river Lot near Aiguillon, and passes through Agen. At Castelsarrasin the railway leaves the Garonne and runs east towards Montauban on the river Tarn, where it turns sharply southeast, and then south to Toulouse.

At Toulouse the railway leaves the Garonne again, following the small river Hers-Mort in southeastern direction. Beyond Carcassonne it follows the river Aude downstream, in eastern direction. At Narbonne the railway turns northeast until Béziers, where it turns east. At Agde it reaches the Mediterranean Sea coast, and runs northeast along the spit that separates the Étang de Thau from the sea. It reaches its eastern terminus Sète after 476 km.

=== Main stations ===
The main stations on the Bordeaux–Sète railway are:

- Bordeaux-Saint-Jean station
- Agen station
- Montauban-Ville-Bourbon station
- Toulouse-Matabiau station
- Carcassonne station
- Narbonne station
- Béziers station
- Sète station

== History ==
The railway was built by the Compagnie des Chemins de fer du Midi. The first section that was opened in 1855 led from Bordeaux to Tonneins. The section between Tonneins and Toulouse was opened in 1856. In 1857 the line was extended to near Sète. Finally in 1858 the line was connected with the existing PLM line from Sète to Montpellier.

== Services ==
The Bordeaux–Sète railway is used by the following passenger services:

- TGV from Paris to Toulouse on the section between Bordeaux and Toulouse
- AVE from Barcelona to Toulouse on the section between Toulouse and Narbonne
- Intercités from Paris to Toulouse and Perpignan on the section between Montauban and Narbonne, from Nantes to Toulouse on the section between Bordeaux and Toulouse and from Bordeaux to Marseille and Nice on the whole line
- TER Nouvelle-Aquitaine and TER Occitanie regional services on the whole line
