= Estavar station =

Railway station in Saillagouse, France

Estavar
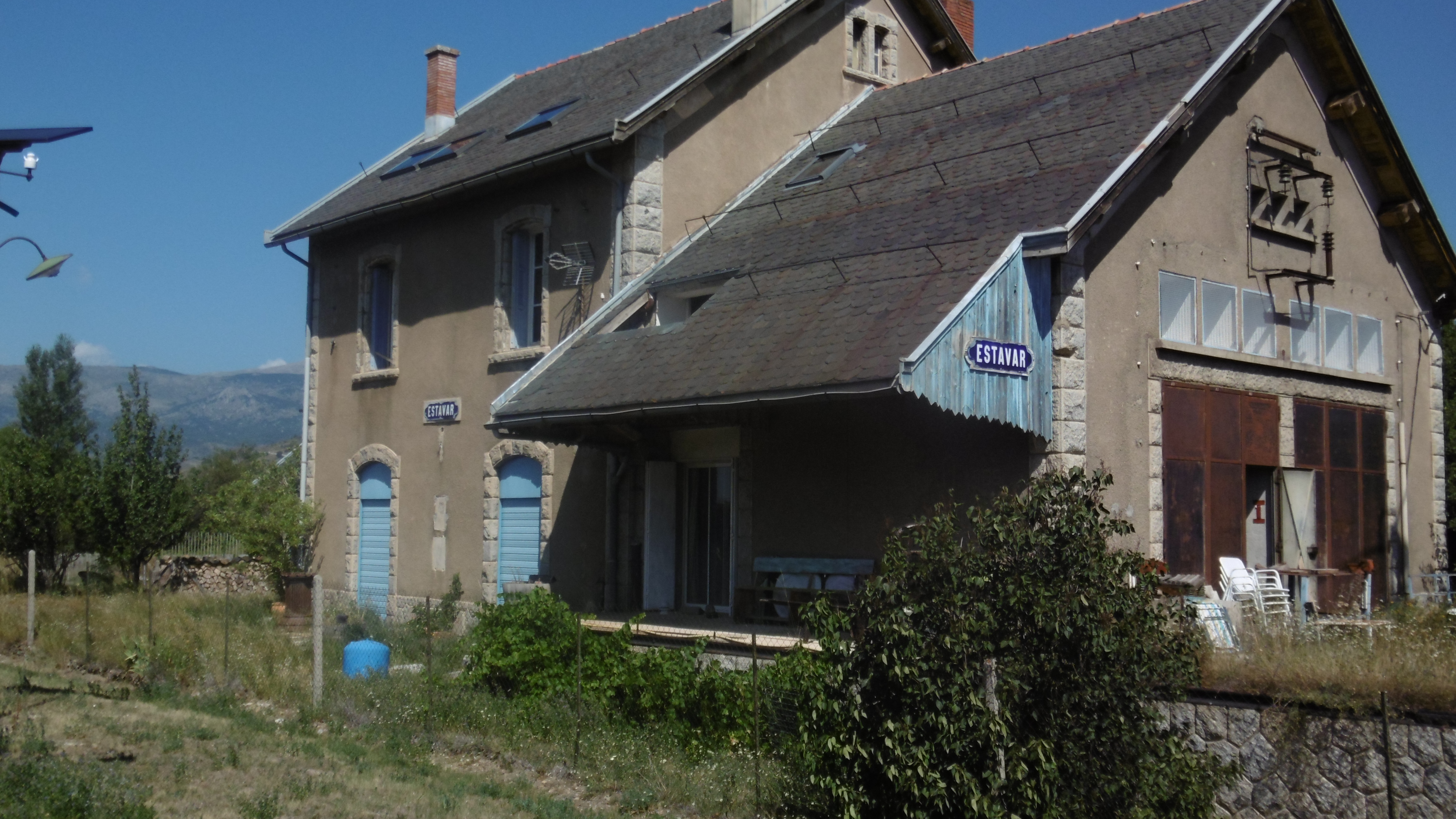
- Gare d'Estavar

General information
- Location: Rue de la gare 66800 Saillagouse; Pyrénées-Orientales; France
- Coordinates: 42.46333°N 2.01806°E
- Elevation: 1,327 m (4,354 ft)
- Owner: SNCF
- Operator: SNCF
- Line: Ligne de Cerdagne
- Distance: 42.463 km
- Platforms: 1
- Tracks: 1

Other information
- Station code: 87784827

Services
Preceding station	TER Occitanie	Following station
Saillagouse towards Latour-de-Carol	32 (Ligne de Cerdagne)	Font-Romeu-Odeillo-Via towards Villefranche–Vernet-les-Bains
Location

Estavar station (French: Gare d'Estavar) is a railway station located in the commune of Saillagouse and close to Estavar, in the department of Pyrénées-Orientales, southern France. The station is owned and operated by SNCF and served by TER Occitanie line 32 (Latour-de-Carol-Enveitg–Villefranche-Vernet-les-Bains, Train Jaune).

The station is located at kilometric point 42.463 of the Ligne de Cerdagne, colloquially known as the Little Yellow Train.
