= Joncet station =

Railway station in Serdinya, France

Joncet
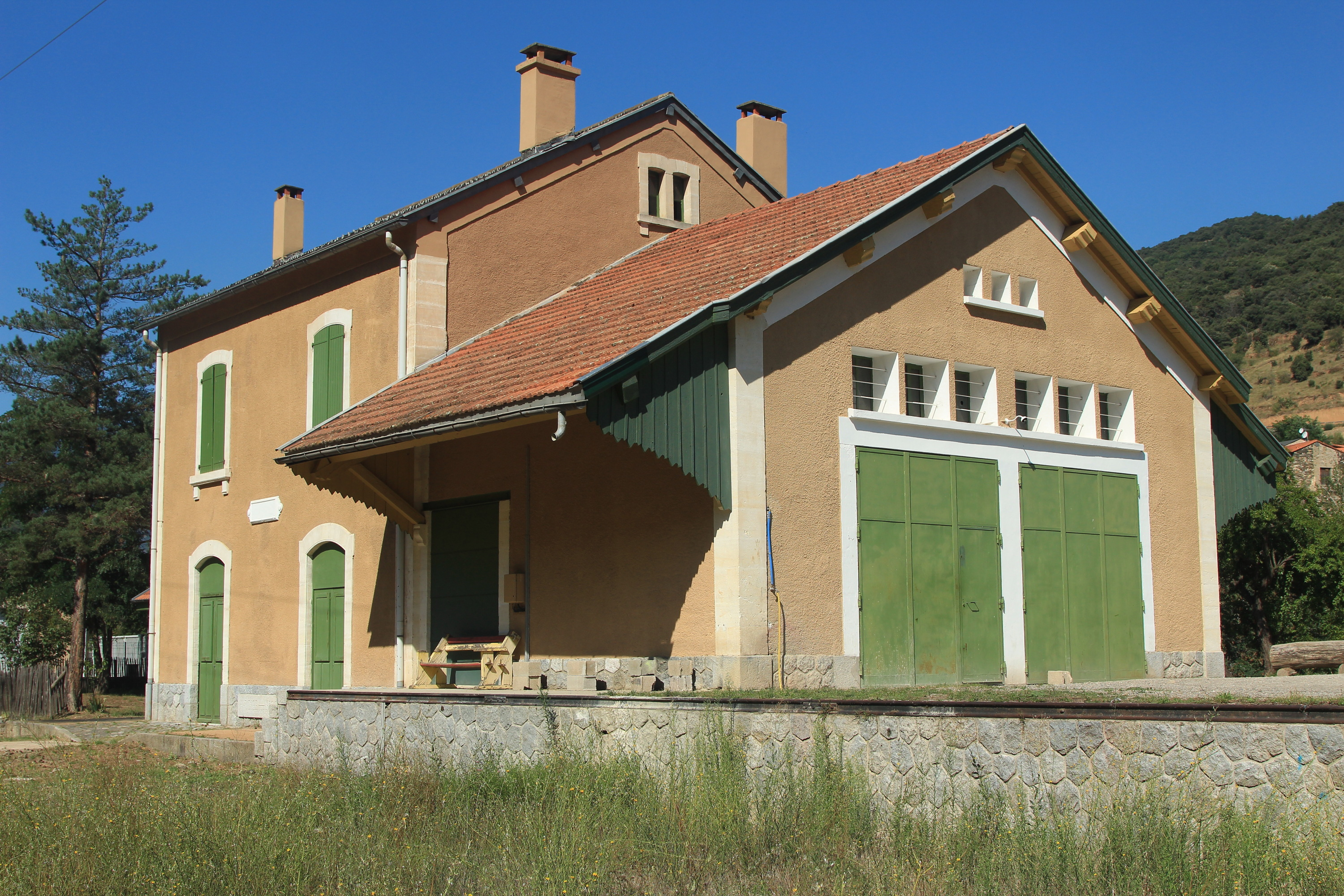
- Joncet station

General information
- Location: Départementale 27; 66360 Serdinya; Pyrénées-Orientales; France
- Coordinates: 42.5617°N 2.3110°E
- Elevation: 549 m (1,801 ft)
- Owner: SNCF
- Operator: SNCF
- Line: Ligne de Cerdagne
- Distance: 6.229 km
- Platforms: 1
- Tracks: 1

Other information
- Station code: 87784710

History
- Opened: 18 July 1910

Passengers
- 2018: 29

Services
Preceding station	TER Occitanie	Following station
Olette-Canaveilles-les-Bains towards Latour-de-Carol	32 (Ligne de Cerdagne)	Serdinya towards Villefranche–Vernet-les-Bains
Location

Joncet station (French: Gare de Joncet) is a French railway station located in the village of Joncet le Sola on the territory of the commune of Serdinya in the department of Pyrénées-Orientales. It is located at kilometric point (KP) 6.229 km on the Ligne de Cerdagne and is served by TER Occitanie operated by the SNCF, line 32 (Latour-de-Carol-Enveitg–Villefranche-Vernet-les-Bains, Train Jaune).

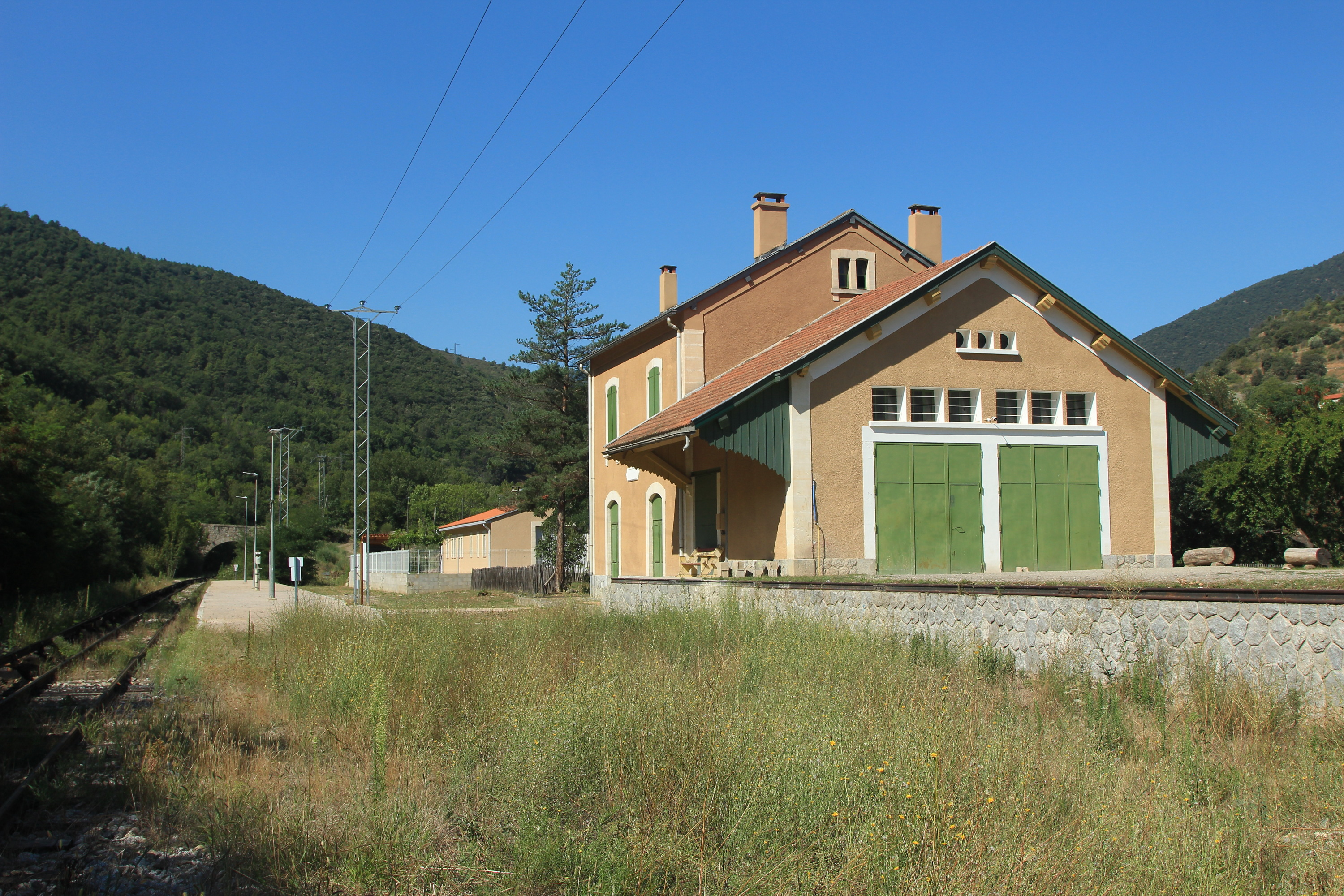
View of the station platforms in 2017.

In 2018, the SNCF estimated that 29 passengers passed through the station.

== History ==
The station was opened on 18 July 1910 by the Chemins de fer du Midi, along with the first section of the Ligne de Cerdagne between Villefranche and Mont-Louis.
