= Thuès-Carança station =

Railway station in Thuès-Entre-Valls, France

Thuès-Carança
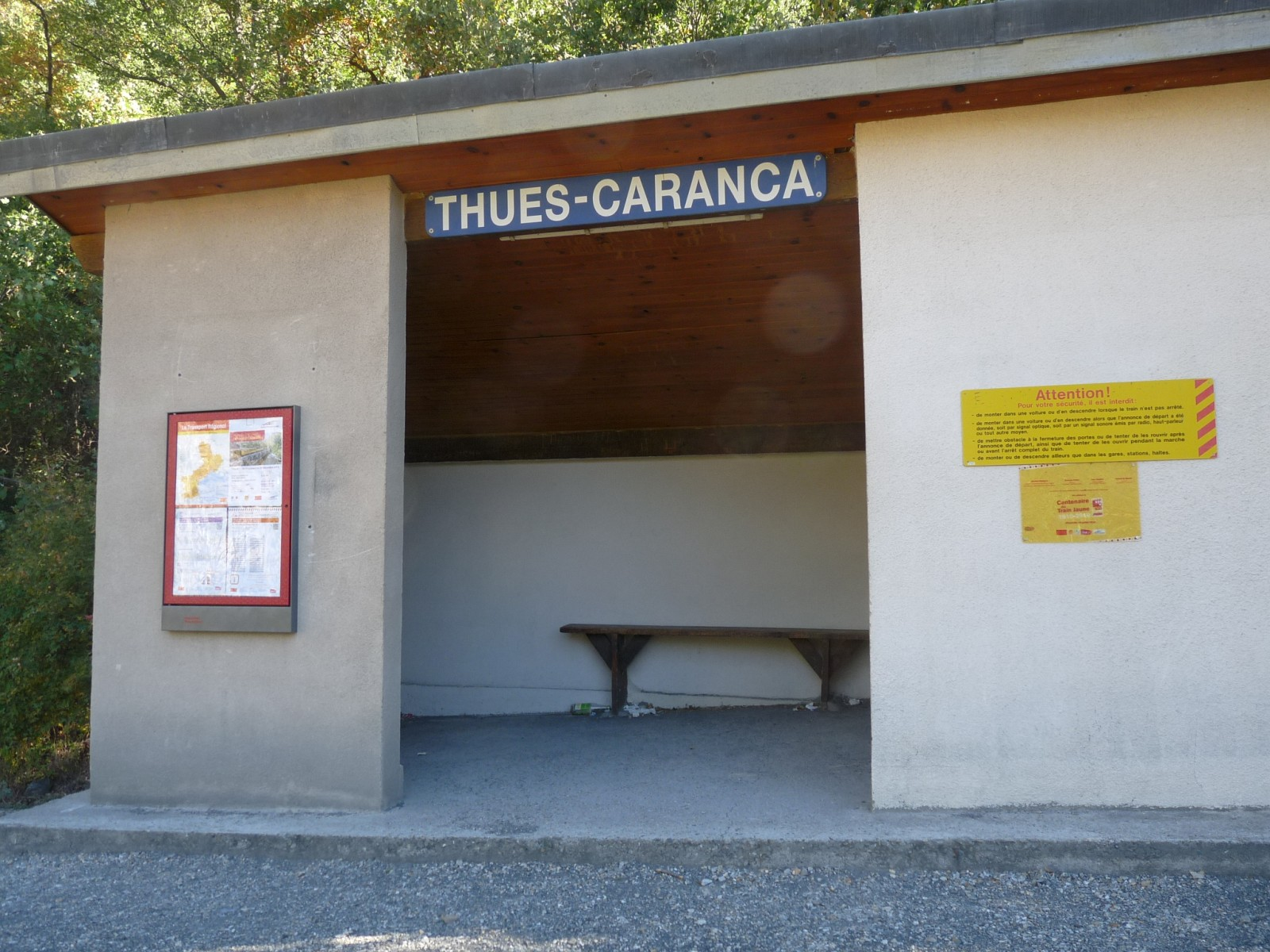

General information
- Location: Thuès-Entre-Valls, Occitanie, France
- Coordinates: 42.52373°N 2.22743°E
- Line: Ligne de Cerdagne

Other information
- Station code: 87784751

Services
Preceding station	TER Occitanie	Following station
Fontpédrouse-Saint-Thomas-les-Bains towards Latour-de-Carol	32 (Ligne de Cerdagne)	Thuès-les-Bains towards Villefranche–Vernet-les-Bains
Location

Thuès-Carança station (French: Gare de Thuès-Carença; formerly Thuès-Village) is a railway station in Pyrénées-Orientales, southern France. Within TER Occitanie, it is part of line 32 (Latour-de-Carol-Enveitg - Villefranche–Vernet-les-Bains, Train Jaune).
