= Osséja station =

Railway station in Osséja, France

Osséja
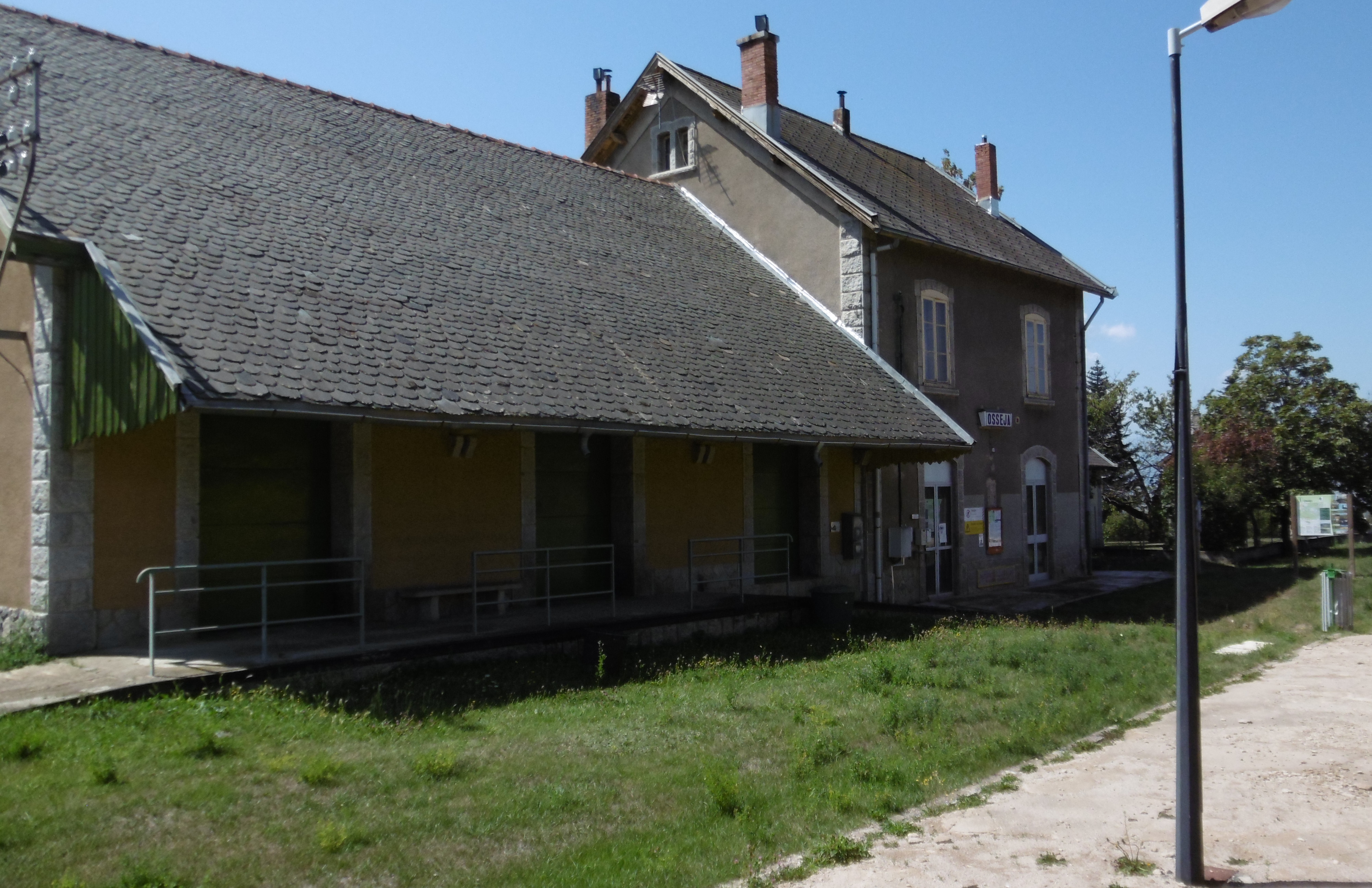
- Osséja railway station

General information
- Location: Osséja, Pyrénées-Orientales, Occitanie, France
- Coordinates: 42°25′11″N 1°58′38″E
- Line: Ligne de Cerdagne
- Platforms: 1
- Tracks: 1

Other information
- Station code: 87784868

Services
Preceding station	TER Occitanie	Following station
Bourg-Madame towards Latour-de-Carol	32 (Ligne de Cerdagne)	Sainte-Léocadie towards Villefranche–Vernet-les-Bains
Location

Osséja is a railway station in Osséja, Occitanie, France. The station is on the Ligne de Cerdagne. The line is a narrow gauge line at 1,000 mm (3 ft 3 3/8 in) and has a third rail pickup at 750 V DC (3rd Rail). Osséja is the southernmost station on the French mainland. The station is served by TER Occitanie (local) trains (known as Train Jaune) operated by the SNCF.

== Train services ==
The following services currently call at Osséja:

- local service (TER Occitanie) Latour-de-Carol-Enveitg–Font-Romeu–Villefranche-Vernet-les-Bains
