= Béna Fanès station =

Railway station in Enveitg, France

Béna Fanès
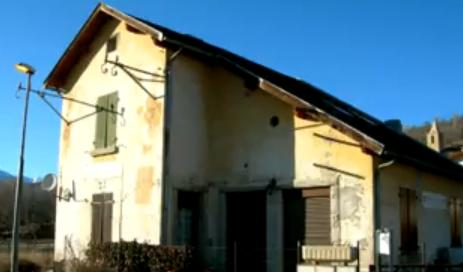
- Béna Fanès railway station

General information
- Location: Enveitg, Pyrénées-Orientales, Occitanie, France
- Coordinates: 42°27′28″N 1°55′01″E
- Line: Ligne de Cerdagne
- Platforms: 1
- Tracks: 1

Other information
- Station code: 87784892

Services
Preceding station	TER Occitanie	Following station
Latour-de-Carol Terminus	32 (Ligne de Cerdagne)	Ur-Les Escaldes towards Villefranche–Vernet-les-Bains
Location

Béna Fanès is a railway station in Enveitg, Occitanie, France. The station is on the Ligne de Cerdagne. The line is a narrow gauge line at 1,000 mm (3 ft 3 3/8 in) and has a third rail pickup at 750 V DC (3rd Rail). The station is served by TER Occitanie (local) trains (known as Train Jaune) operated by the SNCF.

== Train services ==
The following services currently call at Béna Fanès:

- local service (TER Occitanie) Latour-de-Carol-Enveitg–Font-Romeu–Villefranche-Vernet-les-Bains
