= Thuès-Entre-Valls =

Thuès-Entre-Valls Tuès Entre Valls
- Commune
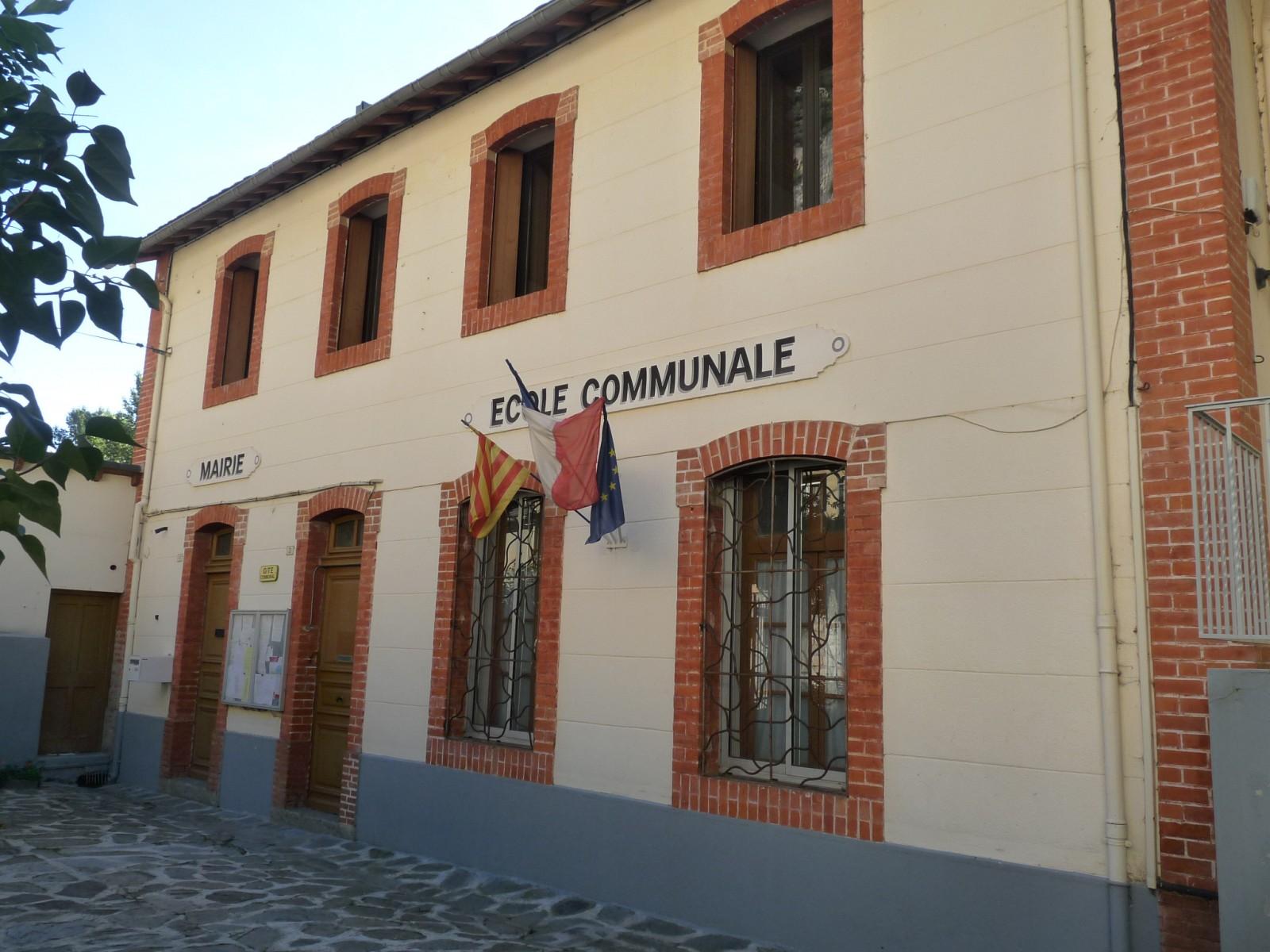
- The town hall in Thuès-Entre-Valls
- Location of Thuès-Entre-Valls
- Location within France Location within Occitanie
- Coordinates: 42°31′31″N 2°13′27″E
- Country: France
- Region: Occitania
- Department: Pyrénées-Orientales
- Arrondissement: Prades
- Canton: Les Pyrénées catalanes

Government
  - Mayor (2020–2026): Jean-Jacques Rouch
- Area^{1}: 20.41 km^{2} (7.88 sq mi)
- Elevation: 810 m (2,660 ft)
- Highest elevation: 2,606 m (8,550 ft)
- Lowest elevation: 740 m (2,430 ft)
- Population (2023): 25
  - Density: 1.2/km^{2} (3.2/sq mi)
- Time zone: UTC+01:00 (CET)
  - Summer (DST): UTC+02:00 (CEST)
- INSEE/Postal code: 66209 /66360
- ^{1} French Land Register data, which excludes lakes, ponds, glaciers > 1 km^{2} (0.386 sq mi or 247 acres) and river estuaries.

Thuès-Entre-Valls (French pronunciation: [tɥɛs ɑ̃tʁ vajs]; Catalan: Toès i Entrevalls) is a commune in the Pyrénées-Orientales department in southern France.

== Geography ==
=== Localisation ===
Thuès-Entre-Valls is located in the canton of Les Pyrénées catalanes and in the arrondissement of Prades.

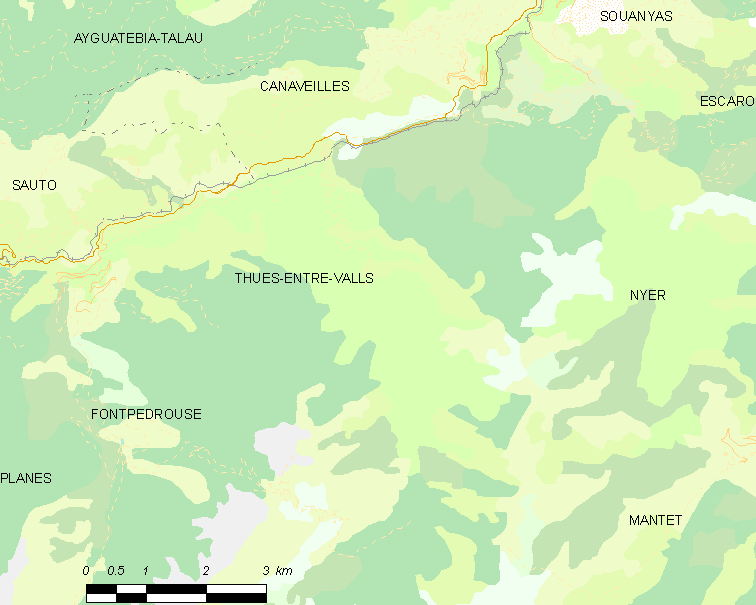
Map of Thuès-Entre-Valls and its surrounding communes

=== Transports ===
The Ligne de Cerdagne and its Yellow train has a station in town, named Thuès-Carança.

== Population ==
Historical population
| Year | Pop. | ±% p.a. |
|---|---|---|
| 1968 | 46 | — |
| 1975 | 23 | −9.43% |
| 1982 | 38 | +7.44% |
| 1990 | 48 | +2.96% |
| 1999 | 41 | −1.74% |
| 2007 | 36 | −1.61% |
| 2012 | 31 | −2.95% |
| 2017 | 37 | +3.60% |
| 2023 | 25 | −6.33% |
Source: INSEE

== See also ==
- Communes of the Pyrénées-Orientales department
