= Saillagouse station =

Railway station in Saillagouse, France

Saillagouse
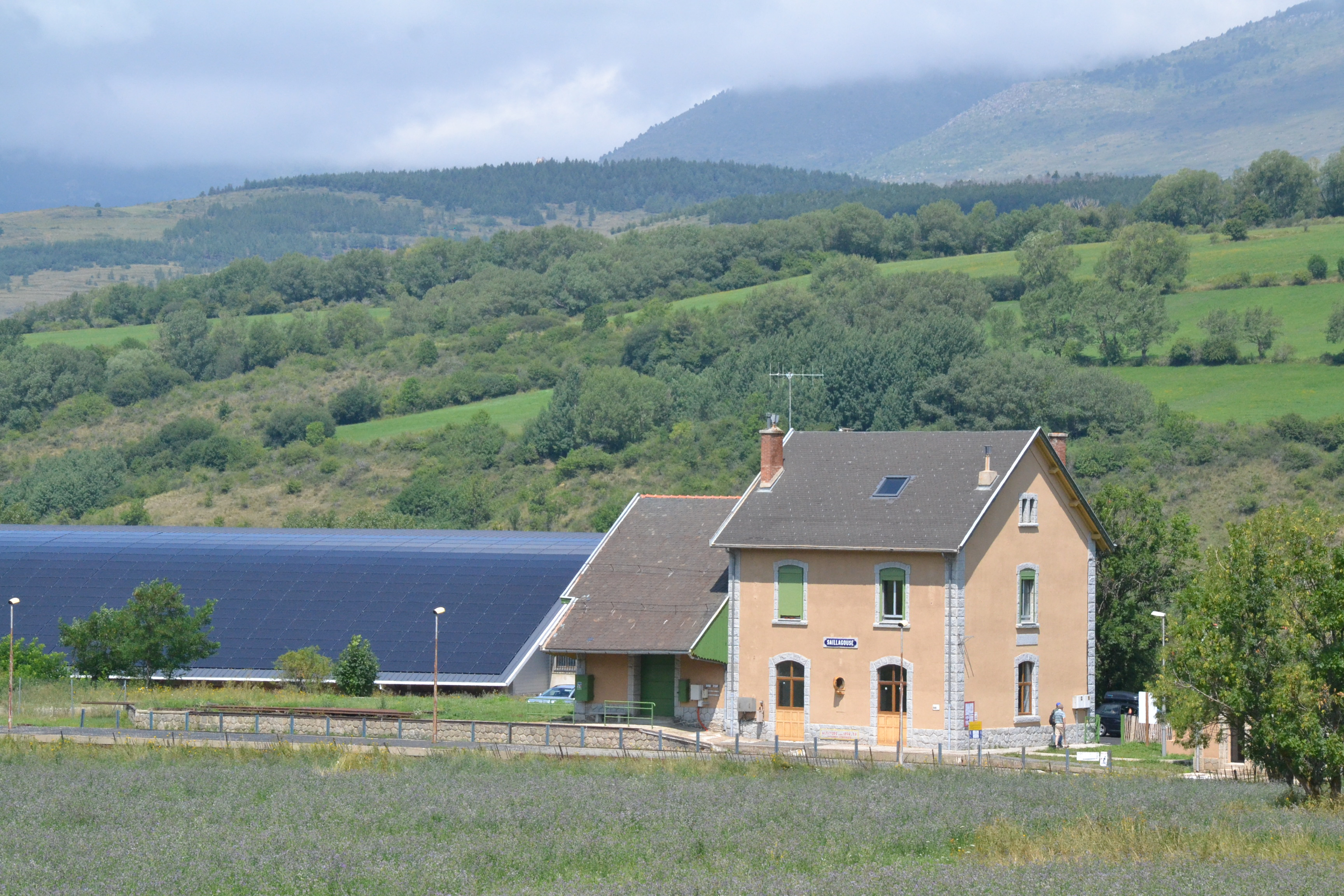
- Gare de Saillagouse

General information
- Location: Saillagouse, Occitanie, France
- Coordinates: 42.45688°N 2.03219°E
- Line: Ligne de Cerdagne

Other information
- Station code: 87784835

Services
Preceding station	TER Occitanie	Following station
Err towards Latour-de-Carol	32 (Ligne de Cerdagne)	Estavar towards Villefranche–Vernet-les-Bains
Location

Saillagouse is a railway station in Saillagouse, Occitanie, southern France. Within TER Occitanie, it is part of line 32 (Latour-de-Carol-Enveitg–Villefranche-Vernet-les-Bains, Train Jaune).
