= Bourg-Madame station =

Railway station in France

Bourg-Madame
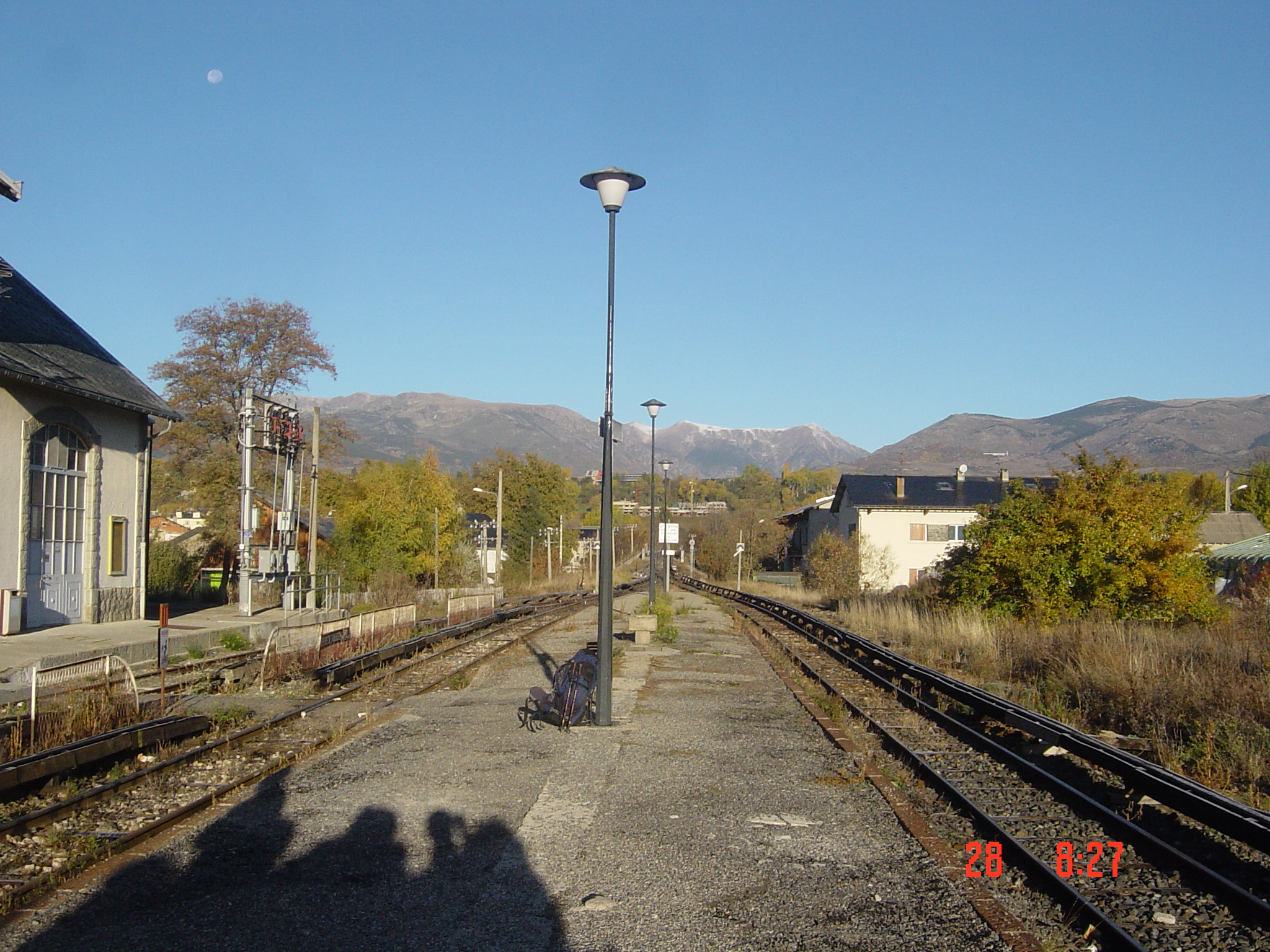
- Bourg-Madame railway station

General information
- Location: Bourg-Madame, Pyrénées-Orientales, Occitanie, France
- Coordinates: 42°25′56″N 1°56′57″E
- Line: Ligne de Cerdagne
- Platforms: 3
- Tracks: 3

Other information
- Station code: 87784876

Services
| Preceding station | TER Occitanie | Following station |
|---|---|---|
| Ur-Les Escaldes towards Latour-de-Carol | 32 (Ligne de Cerdagne) | Osséja towards Villefranche–Vernet-les-Bains |
Location

Bourg-Madame is a railway station in Bourg-Madame, Occitanie, France. The station is on the Ligne de Cerdagne. The line is a narrow gauge line at 1,000 mm (3 ft 3 3/8 in) and has a third rail pickup at 750 V DC (3rd Rail). The station is served by TER Occitanie (local) trains (known as Train Jaune) operated by the SNCF.

== Train services ==
The following services currently call at Bourg-Madame:

- local service (TER Occitanie) Latour-de-Carol-Enveitg–Font-Romeu–Villefranche-Vernet-les-Bains

== Gallery ==
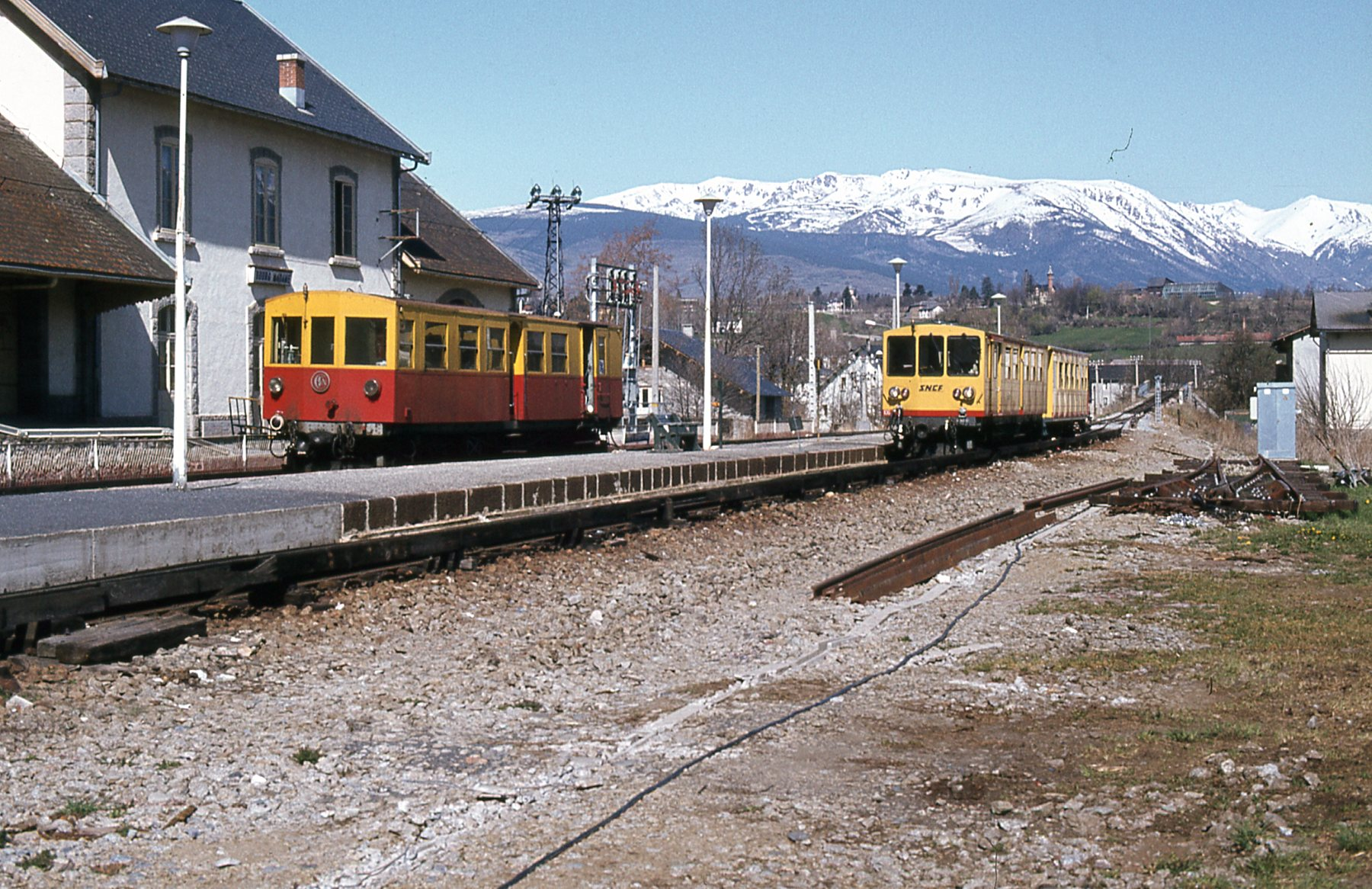
The Station in 1985
