= Ur–Les Escaldes station =

Railway station in Ur, France

Ur–Les Escaldes
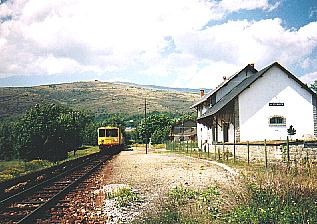
- Ur–Les Escaldes station

General information
- Location: Route d'Espagne; 66760 Ur; Pyrénées-Orientales; France
- Coordinates: 42°27′26″N 1°56′25″E
- Elevation: 1,188 metres (3,898 ft)
- Owner: SNCF
- Operator: SNCF
- Line: Ligne de Cerdagne
- Platforms: 1
- Tracks: 1
- Train operators: TER Occitanie (Train Jaune)

Other information
- Station code: 87784884

Services
| Preceding station | TER Occitanie | Following station |
|---|---|---|
| Béna Fanès towards Latour-de-Carol | 32 (Ligne de Cerdagne) | Bourg-Madame towards Villefranche–Vernet-les-Bains |
Location

Ur–Les Escaldes station (French: Gare d'Ur-Les Escaldes) is a French railway station in Ur, Occitanie, France. The station is on the Ligne de Cerdagne, a narrow gauge line at 1,000 mm (3 ft 3 3/8 in) with a third rail pickup at 750 V DC (3rd rail). The station is served by TER Occitanie (local) trains (known as Train Jaune) operated by the SNCF.

== Train services ==
The following services currently call at Ur-Les Escaldes:

- local service (TER Occitanie) Latour-de-Carol-Enveitg–Font-Romeu–Villefranche-Vernet-les-Bains

== Gallery ==
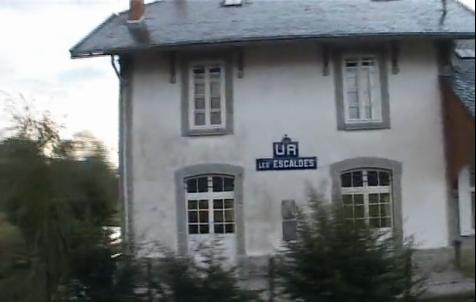
The station

== See also ==
- List of SNCF stations in Occitanie
