= Bolquère–Eyne station =

Railway station in Bolquère, France

Bolquère–Eyne
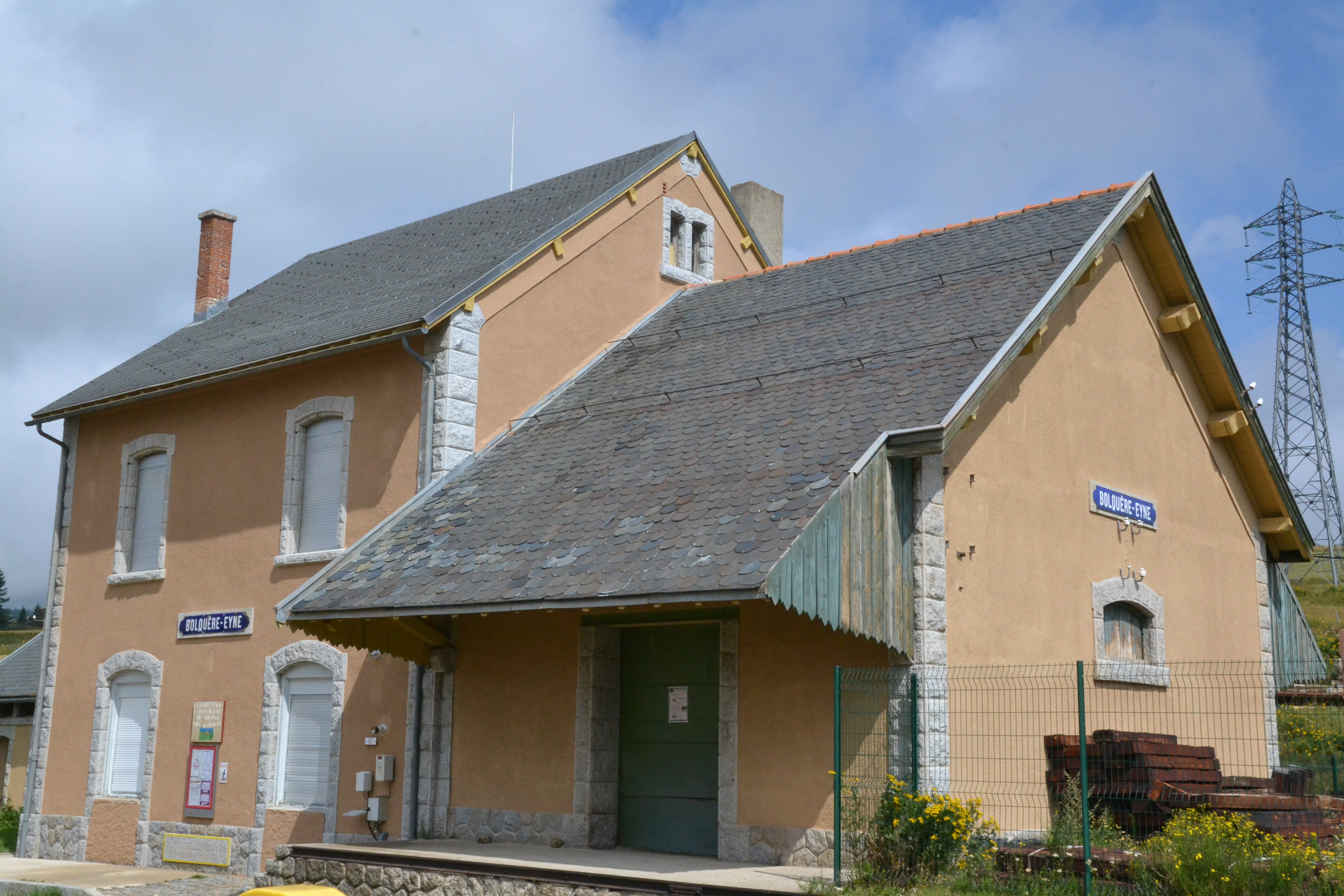
- Gare de Bolquère – Eyne

General information
- Location: Bolquère, Occitanie, France
- Coordinates: 42.49795°N 2.08748°E
- Line: Ligne de Cerdagne

Other information
- Station code: 87784801

Services
Preceding station	TER Occitanie	Following station
Font-Romeu-Odeillo-Via towards Latour-de-Carol	32 (Ligne de Cerdagne)	Mont-Louis-La Cabanasse towards Villefranche–Vernet-les-Bains
Location

Bolquère–Eyne is a railway station in Bolquère, Occitanie, southern France. It is the highest altitude SNCF railway station in France at 1593m. Within TER Occitanie, it is part of line 32 (Latour-de-Carol-Enveitg–Villefranche-Vernet-les-Bains, Train Jaune).
