= Font-Romeu-Odeillo-Via station =

Railway station in Font-Romeu-Odeillo-Via, France

Font-Romeu-Odeillo-Via
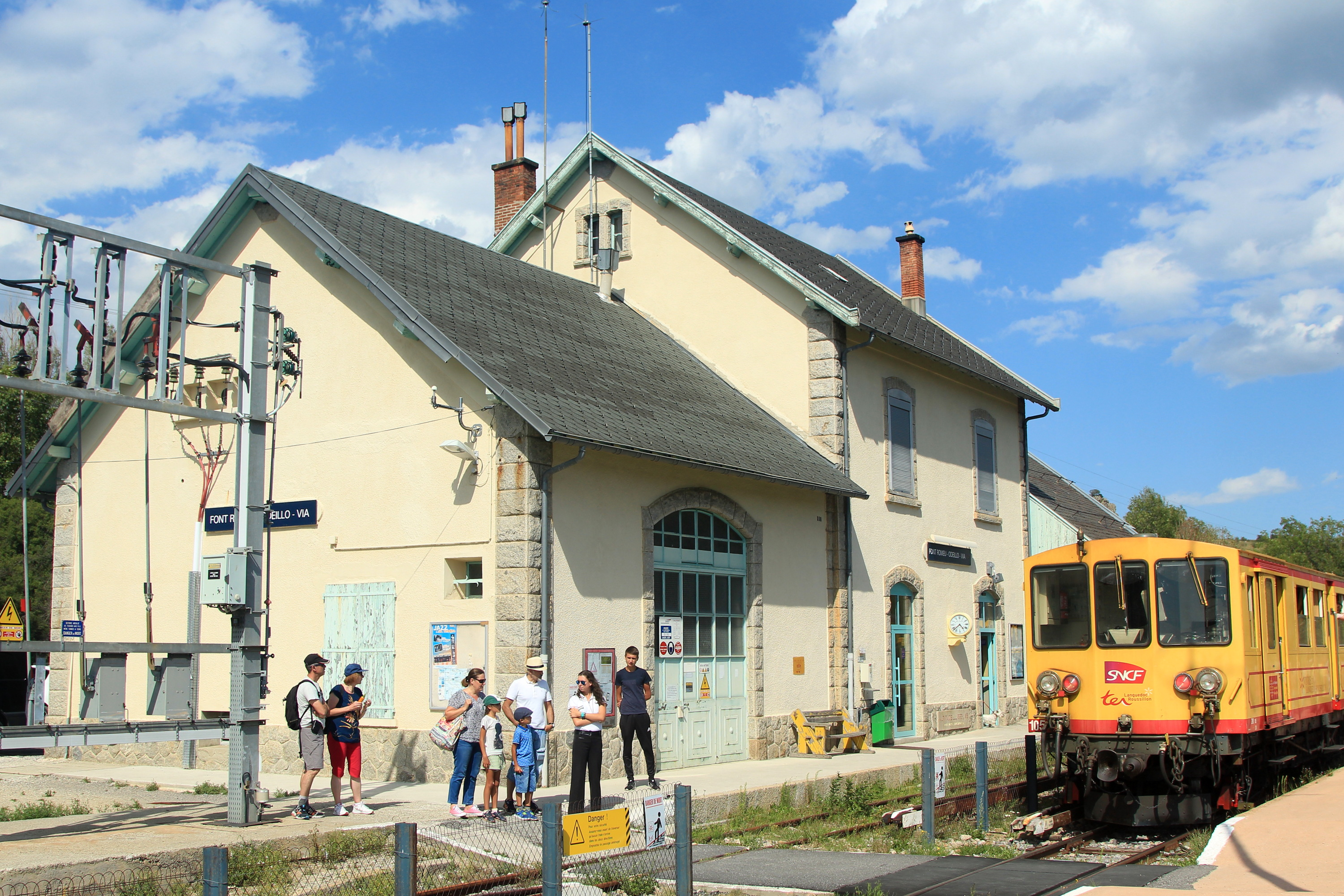
- Arrival of the Train Jaune at Font-Romeu-Odeillo-Via railway station.

General information
- Location: Font-Romeu-Odeillo-Via, Pyrenées-Orientales, France
- Coordinates: 42.49124°N 2.03835°E
- Line: Ligne de Cerdagne

Other information
- Station code: 87784819

Services
| Preceding station | TER Occitanie | Following station |
|---|---|---|
| Estavar towards Latour-de-Carol | 32 (Ligne de Cerdagne) | Bolquère-Eyne towards Villefranche–Vernet-les-Bains |
Location

Font-Romeu-Odeillo-Via is a railway station in Font-Romeu-Odeillo-Via, Pyrenées-Orientales, southern France. Within TER Occitanie, it is part of line 32 (Latour-de-Carol-Enveitg – Villefranche-Vernet-les-Bains, Train Jaune).
