= Fontpédrouse-Saint-Thomas-les-Bains station =

Railway station in Fontpédrouse, France

Fontpédrouse Saint-Thomas-les-Bains
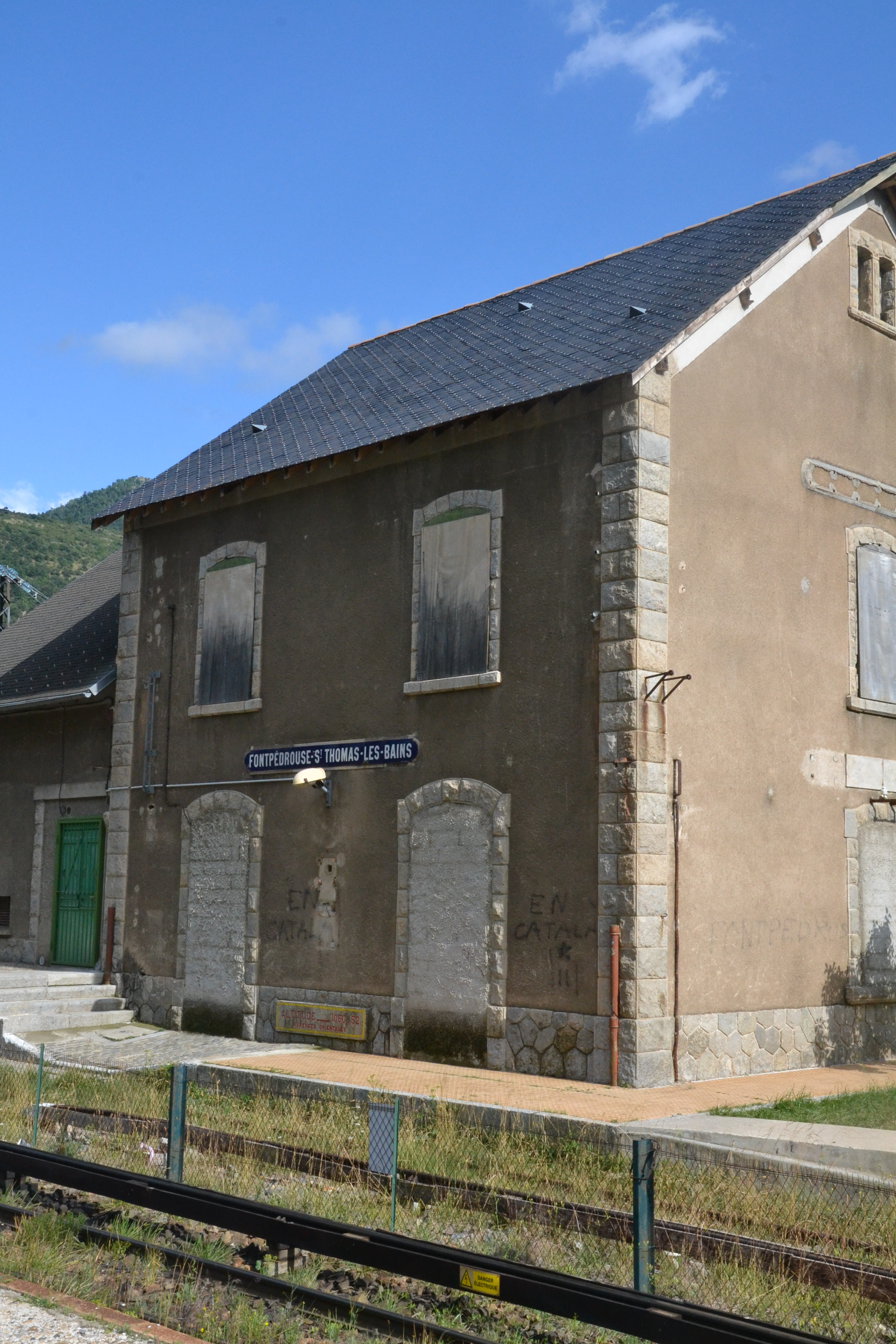
- Fontpédrouse–Saint-Thomas-les-Bains station

General information
- Location: Fontpédrouse, Occitanie, France
- Coordinates: 42.51376°N 2.1885°E
- Line: Ligne de Cerdagne

Other information
- Station code: 87784769

Services
Preceding station	TER Occitanie	Following station
Sauto towards Latour-de-Carol	32 (Ligne de Cerdagne)	Thuès-Carança towards Villefranche–Vernet-les-Bains
Location

Fontpédrouse–Saint-Thomas-les-Bains station (French: Gare de Fontpédrouse–Saint-Thomas-les-Bains) is a railway station in Fontpédrouse, Occitanie, southern France. Within TER Occitanie, it is part of line 32 (Latour-de-Carol-Enveitg–Villefranche-Vernet-les-Bains, Train Jaune).
