= Ligne de Cerdagne =

Railway line in France

Coordinates: 42°30′14″N 2°07′40″E

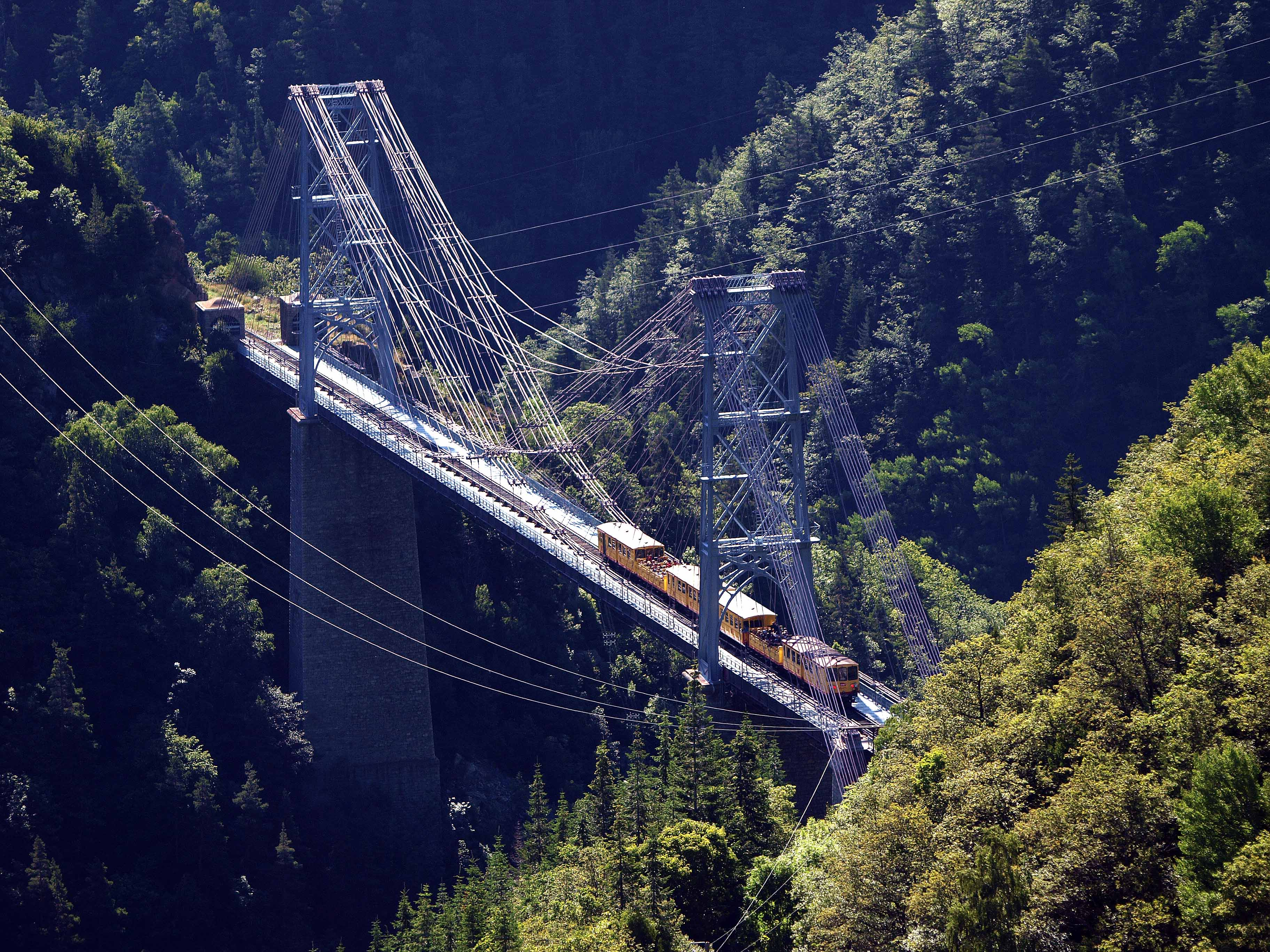
- The unusual rail suspension bridge at Pont Gisclard between Sauto and Planès

Overview
- Other name: Yellow Train
- Status: operational
- Locale: France
- Stations: 22

History
- Opened: 1910

Technical
- Line length: 63 km (39 mi)
- Track gauge: 1,000 mm (3 ft 3 3/8 in) metre gauge
- Electrification: 850 V DC third rail
- Operating speed: 55 km/h (34 mph)
- Highest elevation: 1,593 m (5,226 ft)

The Ligne de Cerdagne (French pronunciation: [liɲ də sɛʁdaɲ]), usually referred to as the Train Jaune (English: Yellow Train, Catalan: Tren Groc), is a 1,000 mm (3 ft 3 3/8 in) gauge railway that runs from Villefranche-de-Conflent to Latour-de-Carol-Enveitg in the French Pyrenees.

== History of the Line ==
The section of line between Villefranche-de-Conflent and Bourg-Madame was declared a public utility by law on 4 March 1903. This same law approved the granting of a concession for the line, signed on 5 December 1902, between the Minister of Public Works and the Compagnie des Chemins de Fer du Midi et du Canal Latéral à la Garonne. The law also superseded an earlier proposed standard gauge railway which had been authorised between Villefranche-de-Conflent and Olette, but never built.

A second law was approved on 23 March 1914 to extend the railway from Bourg-Madame to the 'French frontier station' of the transpyrenean line from Ax les Thermes to Ripoll, although the present station name at the terminus of Latour de Carol Enveitg was not mentioned. The declaration of public utility for this section of the line was confirmed on 4 September 1922.

Construction started in 1903 and the section to Mont-Louis was completed in 1910, followed by the extension to Latour-de-Carol in 1927.

== Description of the Line ==
The line is 63 kilometres (39 mi) long and climbs to 1,593 metres (5,226 ft) at Bolquère-Eyne, the highest railway station in France. The line serves 22 stations, fourteen of which are "request stops" (i.e., the train only stops when specifically requested by passengers). There are 19 tunnels, the longest of which is the Tunnel du Pla de Llaurar with a length of 380 metres (1,250 ft), located at kilometre point 59.639.

Amongst the various structures along the line are two viaducts over the River Têt classified as Historic Monuments because of their architectural and technical importance:

1. The Pont Séjourné, a 236.70 meters-long masonry viaduct at kilometer 18.002 in the town of Fontpédrouse
2. The Pont Cassagne (also known as Pont Gisclard) at kilometre 24.422 is 253 metres (830 ft) long and, unusual for a railway bridge, a suspension bridge - the only one in France located on an operating railway. In 2023, a major project was carried out to replace 12 of the suspension cables.

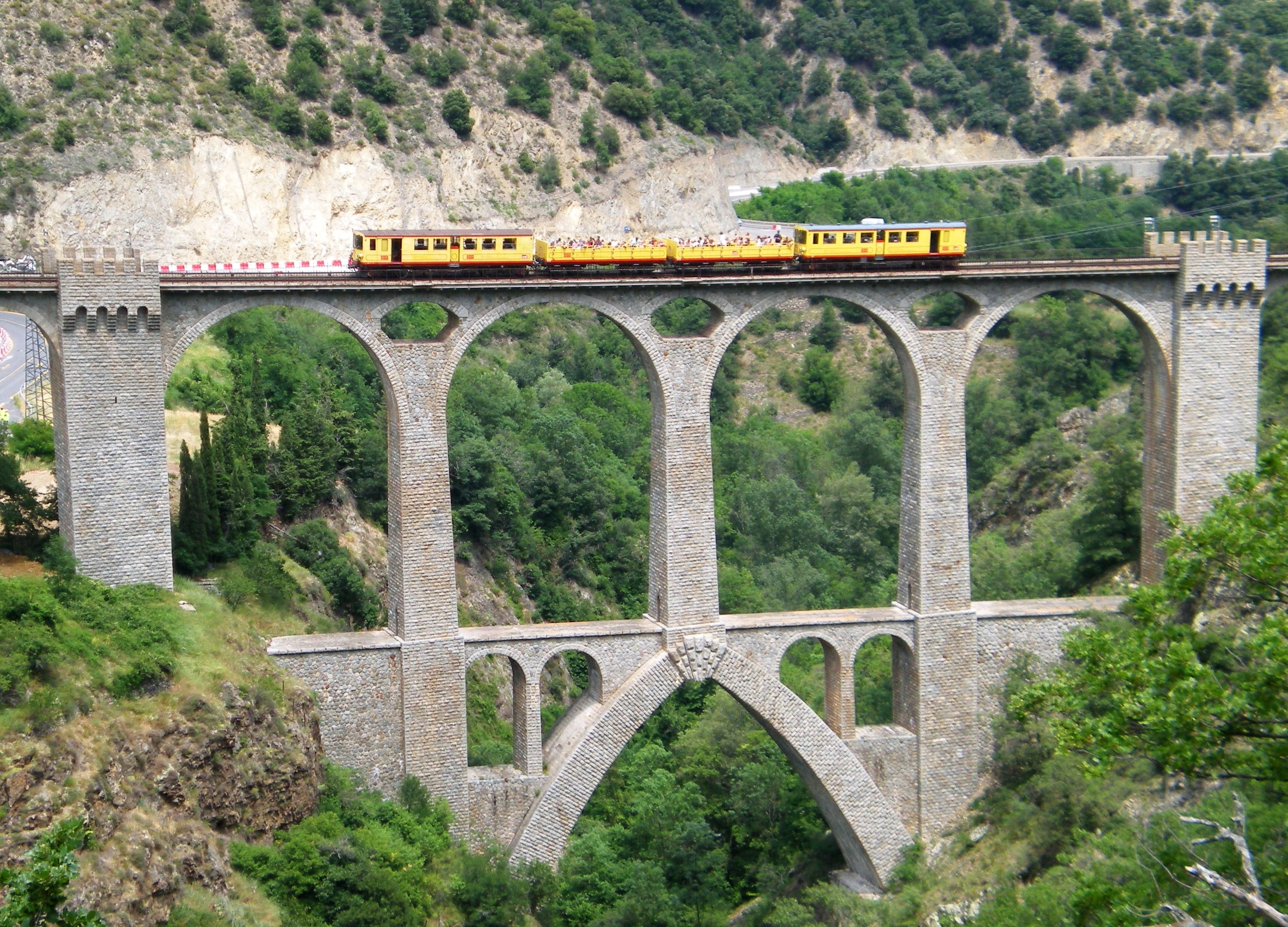
The Séjourné Bridge.

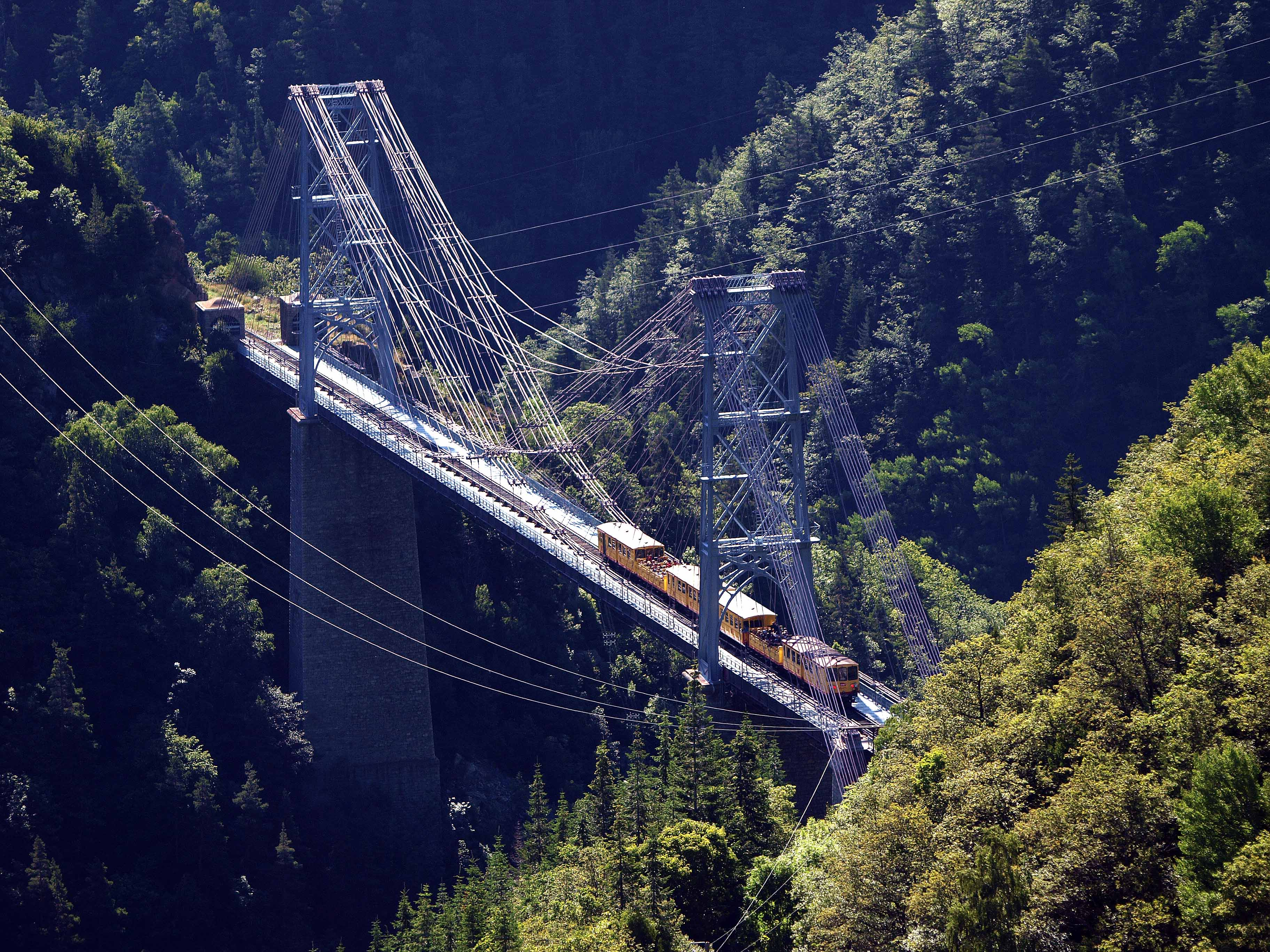
The Gisclard Bridge.

The line is single-track with passing loops at, for example, Mont-Louis and Fontpédrouse-Saint-Thomas-les-Bains.

The trains are powered by electricity at 850 volts DC, supplied by third rail. The power is supplied by hydro-electric generators on the River Têt. The maximum speed of the train is 55 km/h (34 mph). Two types of train are used: ones using modern, entirely closed two-car multiple units, and others using old-style trailer carriages and powered carriages - most are enclosed, though open carriages are also used when the weather allows. The open carriages allow dramatic views as the train traverses the twisting route and are popular with tourists. Line maintenance vehicles are stored at Villefranche-de-Conflent.

It is named after its yellow and red colours, derived from the Catalan flag. The line was constructed to provide an all-weather route from the high Cerdagne valley to the coast but, as the adjacent N116 road has been progressively improved, there has been population loss in the Cerdagne and the rail link is now chiefly a tourist attraction. Though its long-term future was in doubt in 2017, 80 million euros was invested in the line between 2010 and 2023 by the agency 'Plan Rail'.

== List of stations ==
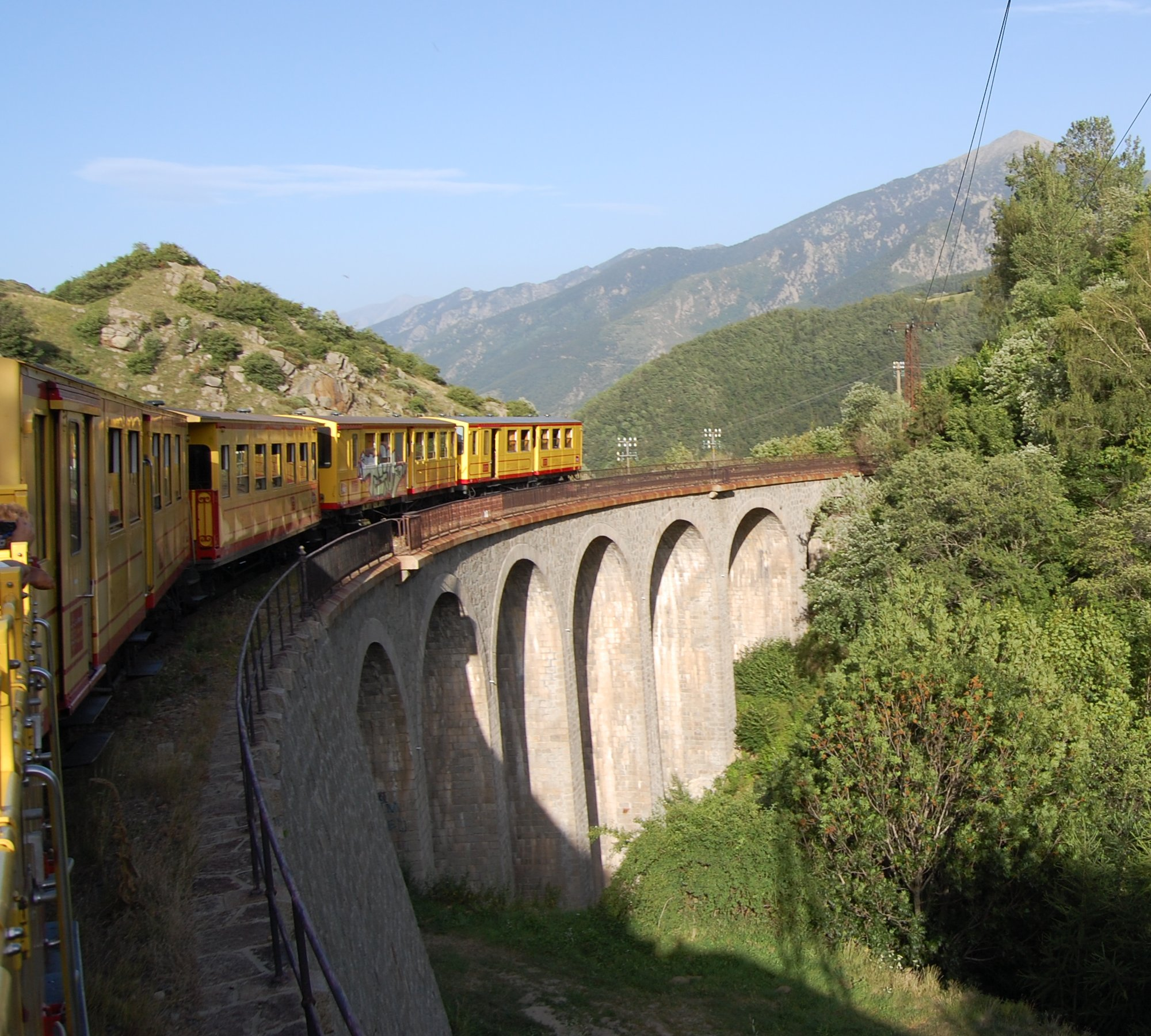
Crossing a viaduct

km	Station	Altitude (m)	Local attractions
0	Villefranche-Vernet-les-Bains (interchange with services to Perpignan)	427	walled town, Fort Liberia, Grottes Les Canalettes
4.990	Serdinya	526	
6.229	Joncet	550	
9.720	Olette-Canaveilles-les-Bains	608	
11.613	Nyer (halt)	664	Nature reserve, exhibition of bats at the Maison de la réserve
13.860	Thuès-les-Bains	747	
16.273	Thuès-Carança	789	access to the Gorges de la Carança
19.704	Fontpédrouse-Saint-Thomas-les-Bains	1051	Baths at St-Thomas-les-Bains
22.727	Sauto	1224	
25.222	Planès	1373	11th-century church
27.871	Mont-Louis-La Cabanasse	1511	Citadelle de Mont-Louis; Mont-Louis Solar Furnace
30.214	Bolquère-Eyne	1593	summit of the line
34.925	Font-Romeu-Odeillo-Via	1534	
42.463	Estavar	1328	
44.670	Saillagouse	1302	
46.613	Err	1335	10th-century church of Our Lady of Err
48.389	Sainte-Léocadie	1281	Musée de Cerdagne
52.835	Osséja	1241	
55.689	Bourg-Madame	1144	Espace d'Art Contemporain; border town
58.711	Ur-Les Escaldes	1188	romanesque church
61.384	Béna Fanès		
62.561	Latour-de-Carol-Enveitg (interchange with services to Toulouse and Barcelona)	1247	Enveitg castle and baroque chapel

== Electrical discharges ==
In 1911, railway workers reported a fireball on the third rail between kilometres 28 and 40. A similar phenomenon occurred again when a train was hit by one of these fireballs during a thunderstorm. Lightning rods were installed where these events had occurred and the phenomenon has not been reported since installation.

== See also ==
- List of highest railways in Europe
