= Estavar =

- Commune
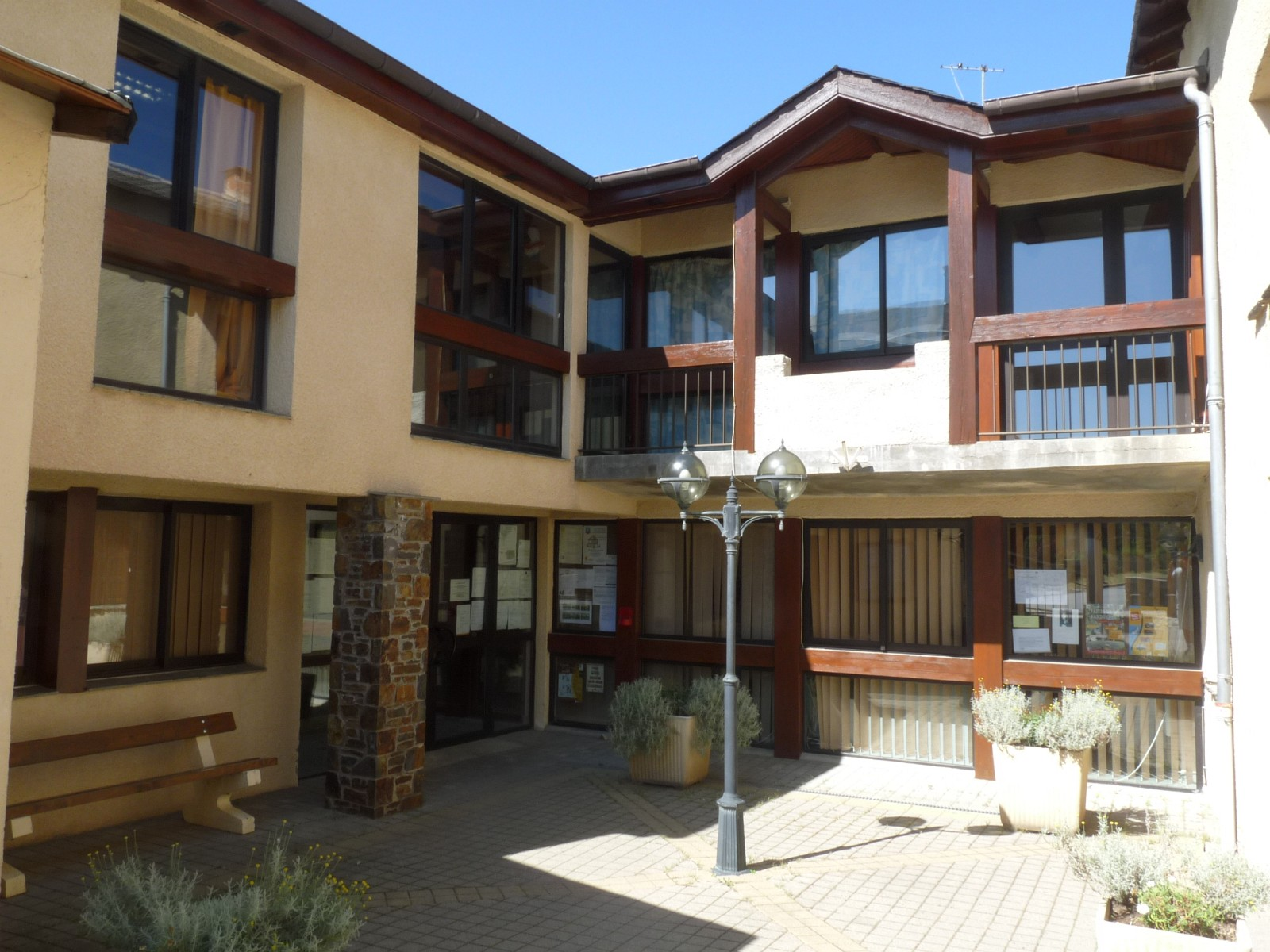
- The town hall in Estavar

- Coat of arms
- Location of Estavar
- Location within France Location within Occitanie
- Coordinates: 42°28′17″N 1°59′53″E
- Country: France
- Region: Occitania
- Department: Pyrénées-Orientales
- Arrondissement: Prades
- Canton: Les Pyrénées catalanes
- Intercommunality: Pyrénées Cerdagne

Government
  - Mayor (2020–2026): Laurent Leygue
- Area^{1}: 9.24 km^{2} (3.57 sq mi)
- Elevation: 1,293 m (4,242 ft)
- Highest elevation: 1,659 m (5,443 ft)
- Lowest elevation: 1,200 m (3,900 ft)
- Population (2023): 443
  - Density: 47.9/km^{2} (124/sq mi)
- Time zone: UTC+01:00 (CET)
  - Summer (DST): UTC+02:00 (CEST)
- INSEE/Postal code: 66072 /66800
- ^{1} French Land Register data, which excludes lakes, ponds, glaciers > 1 km^{2} (0.386 sq mi or 247 acres) and river estuaries.

Estavar (French pronunciation: [ɛstavaʁ]; Catalan: Estavar) is a commune in the Pyrénées-Orientales department in southern France.

== Geography ==
Estavar is located in the canton of Les Pyrénées catalanes and in the arrondissement of Prades. Estavar station has rail connections to Villefranche-de-Conflent and Latour-de-Carol.

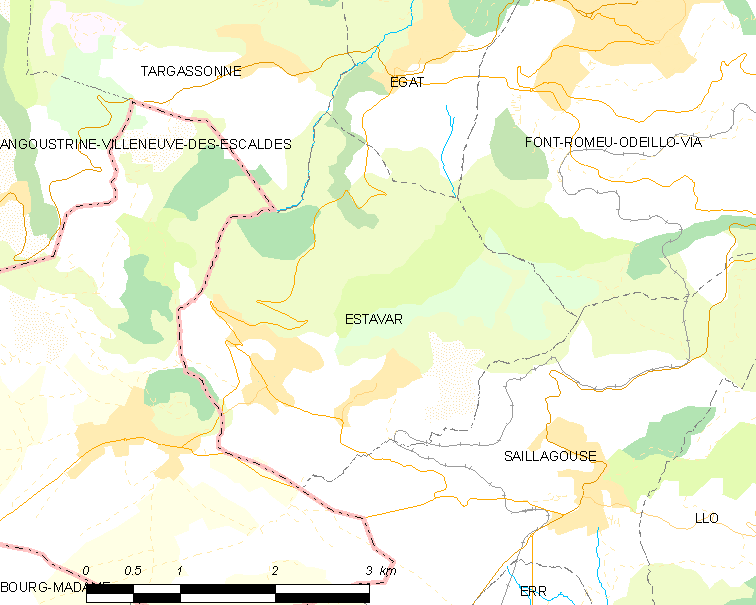
Map of Estavar and its surrounding communes

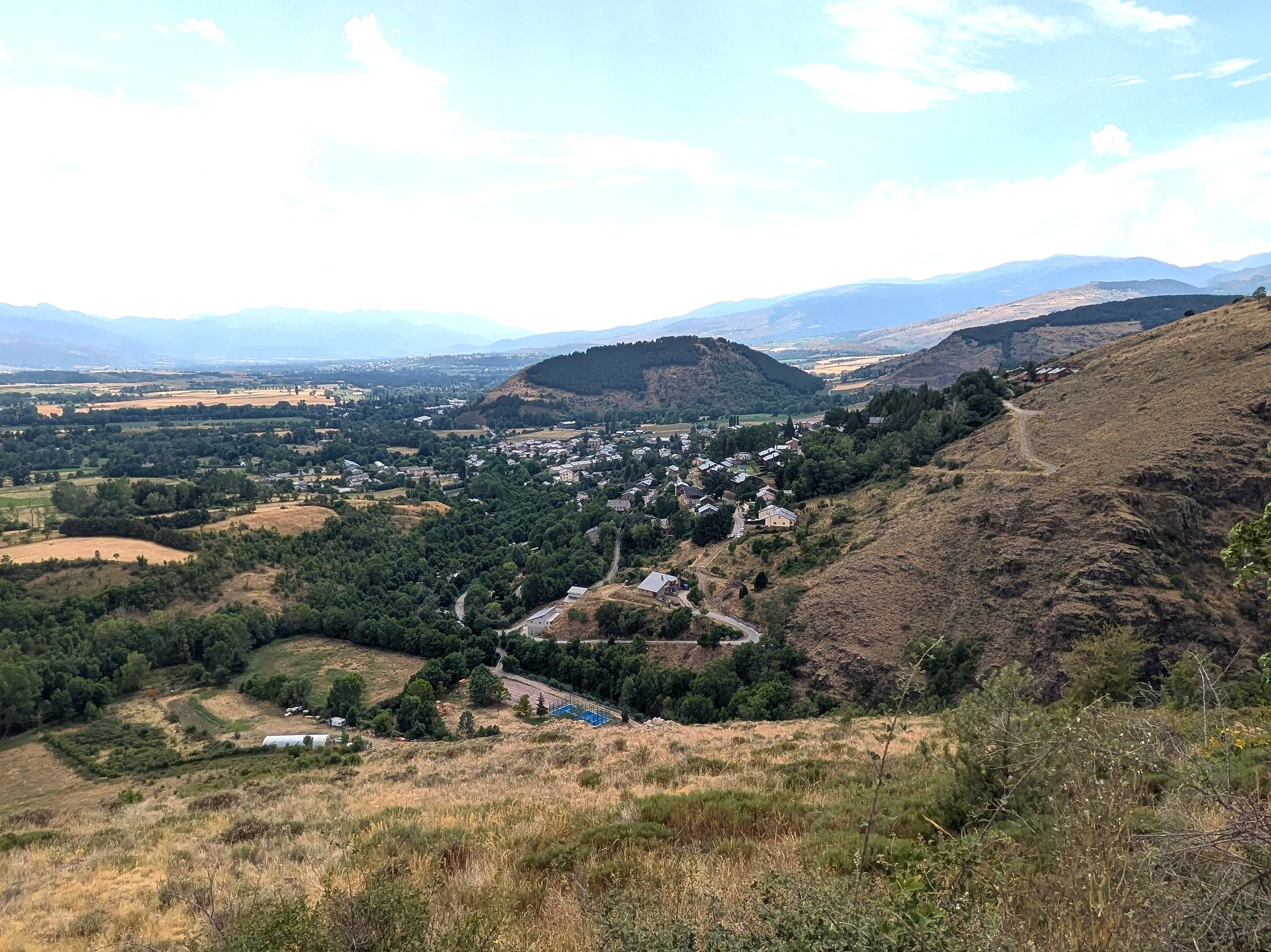
Estavar village, view to the west. The rounded hill beyond Estavar is in the Spanish enclave of Llívia.

== Population ==
Historical population
Year	Pop.	±% p.a.
1968	178	—
1975	206	+2.11%
1982	281	+4.54%
1990	358	+3.07%
1999	409	+1.49%
2007	470	+1.75%
2012	408	−2.79%
2017	472	+2.96%
2023	443	−1.05%
Source: INSEE

== See also ==
- Communes of the Pyrénées-Orientales department
