= Fontpédrouse =

Fontpédrouse Fontpedrosa
- Commune
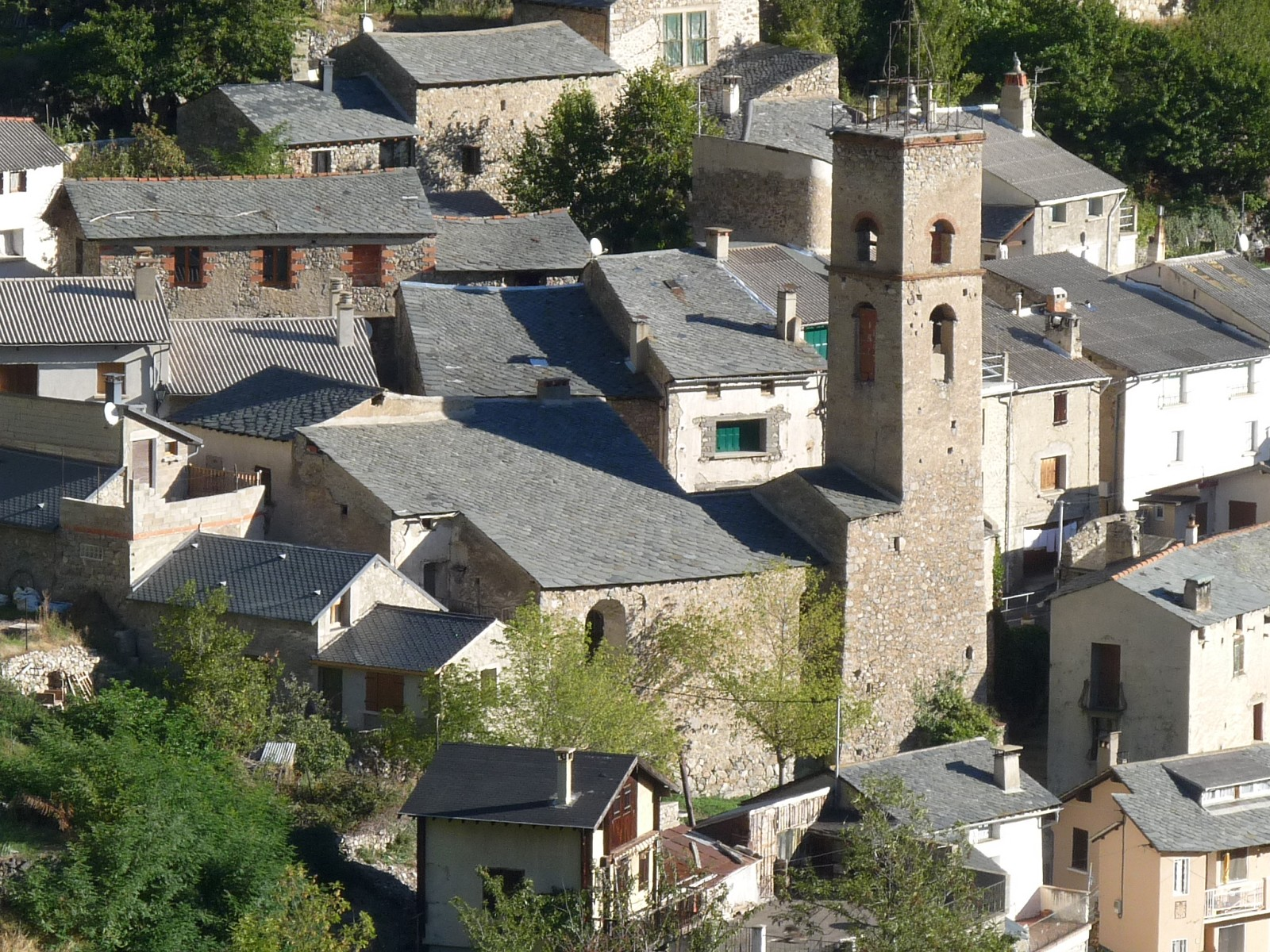
- The church in Fontpédrouse
- Location of Fontpédrouse
- Location within France Location within Occitanie
- Coordinates: 42°30′46″N 2°10′51″E
- Country: France
- Region: Occitania
- Department: Pyrénées-Orientales
- Arrondissement: Prades
- Canton: Les Pyrénées catalanes

Government
  - Mayor (2020–2026): Chantal Calvet
- Area^{1}: 64.35 km^{2} (24.85 sq mi)
- Elevation: 1,062 m (3,484 ft)
- Highest elevation: 2,865 m (9,400 ft)
- Lowest elevation: 880 m (2,890 ft)
- Population (2023): 125
  - Density: 1.94/km^{2} (5.03/sq mi)
- Time zone: UTC+01:00 (CET)
  - Summer (DST): UTC+02:00 (CEST)
- INSEE/Postal code: 66080 /66360
- ^{1} French Land Register data, which excludes lakes, ponds, glaciers > 1 km^{2} (0.386 sq mi or 247 acres) and river estuaries.

Fontpédrouse (French pronunciation: [fɔ̃pedʁuz]; Catalan: Fontpedrosa) is a commune in the Pyrénées-Orientales department in southern France.

== Geography ==
Fontpédrouse is located in the canton of Les Pyrénées catalanes and in the arrondissement of Prades. Fontpédrouse-Saint-Thomas-les-Bains station has rail connections to Villefranche-de-Conflent and Latour-de-Carol.

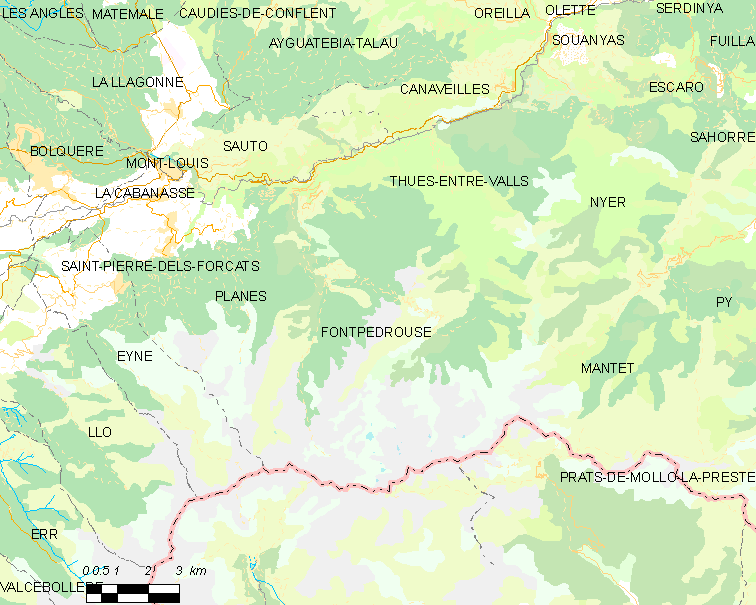
Map of Fontpédrouse and its surrounding communes

The village of Fontpédrouse is located in the Têt valley.

== History ==
On 26 June 1822 (204 years ago), the commune of Prats-Saint-Thomas was merged into Fontpédrouse.

In December 1932, parts of the hamlets of Prats-Saint-Thomas were destroyed by heavy rains which caused several landslides.

== Population ==
Historical population
Year	Pop.	±% p.a.
1968	188	—
1975	147	−3.45%
1982	108	−4.31%
1990	138	+3.11%
1999	123	−1.27%
2007	123	+0.00%
2012	133	+1.58%
2017	123	−1.55%
2023	125	+0.27%
Source: INSEE

== See also ==
- Communes of the Pyrénées-Orientales department
