= Osséja =

Osséja Oceja (Catalan)
- Commune
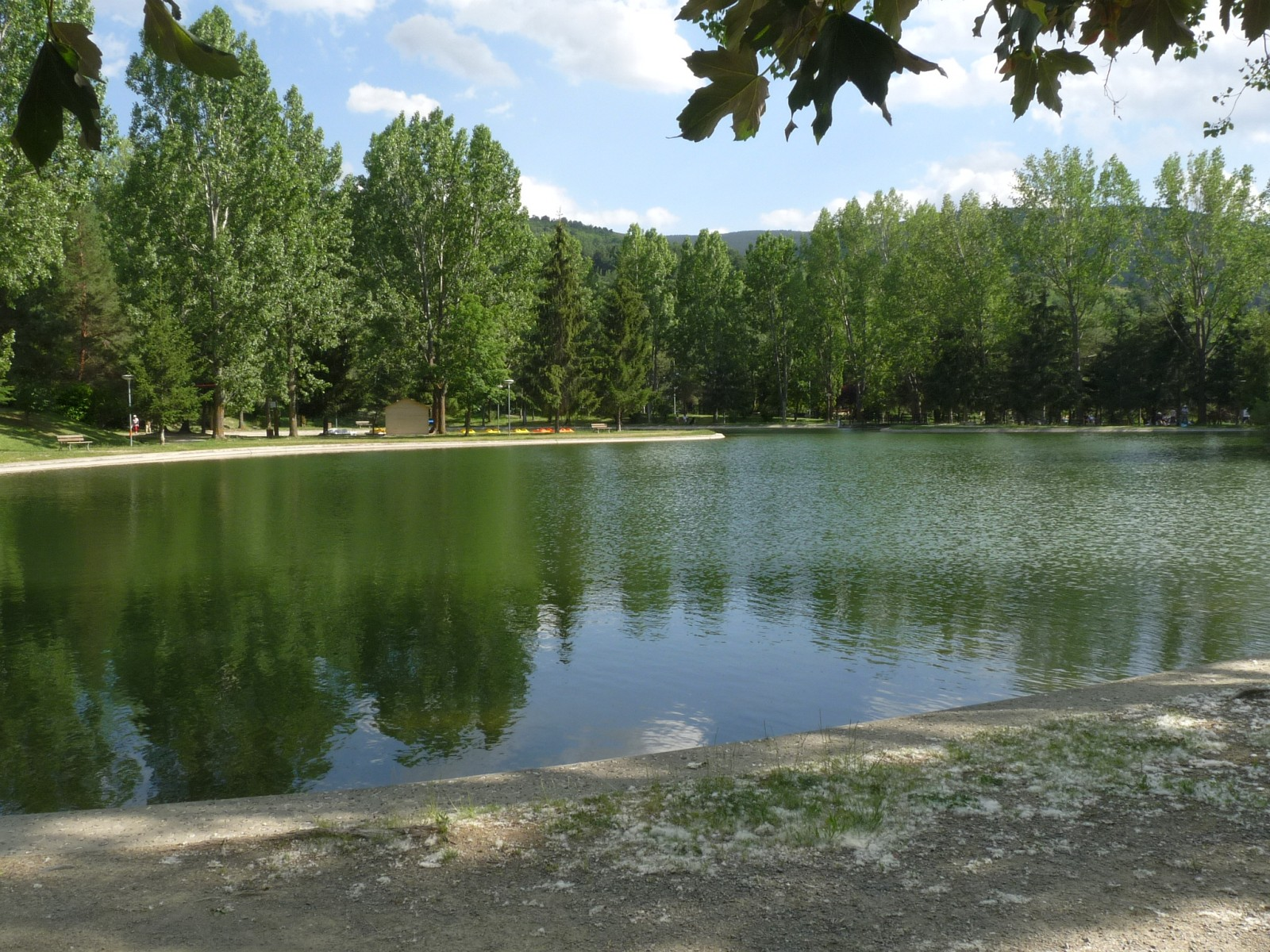
- The Lake of Osséja

- Coat of arms
- Location of Osséja
- Location within France Location within Occitanie
- Coordinates: 42°25′01″N 1°58′54″E
- Country: France
- Region: Occitania
- Department: Pyrénées-Orientales
- Arrondissement: Prades
- Canton: Les Pyrénées catalanes
- Intercommunality: Pyrénées Cerdagne

Government
  - Mayor (2020–2026): Roger Ciurana
- Area^{1}: 17.13 km^{2} (6.61 sq mi)
- Elevation: 1,247 m (4,091 ft)
- Highest elevation: 2,192 m (7,192 ft)
- Lowest elevation: 1,187 m (3,894 ft)
- Population (2023): 1,390
  - Density: 81.1/km^{2} (210/sq mi)
- Time zone: UTC+01:00 (CET)
  - Summer (DST): UTC+02:00 (CEST)
- INSEE/Postal code: 66130 /66340
- ^{1} French Land Register data, which excludes lakes, ponds, glaciers > 1 km^{2} (0.386 sq mi or 247 acres) and river estuaries.

Osséja (French: [ɔseʒa]; Catalan: Oceja [uˈseʒə]) is a commune in the Pyrénées-Orientales department in southern France.

== Geography ==
Osséja is located in the canton of Les Pyrénées catalanes and in the arrondissement of Prades. Osséja station has rail connections to Villefranche-de-Conflent and Latour-de-Carol.

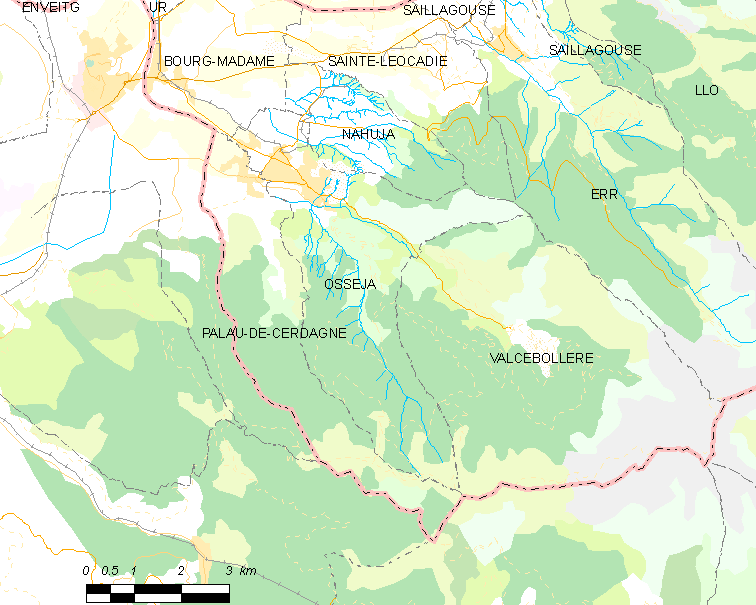
Map of Osséja and its surrounding communes

== Population ==
Historical population
Year	Pop.	±% p.a.
1968	1,082	—
1975	1,134	+0.67%
1982	1,279	+1.73%
1990	1,274	−0.05%
1999	1,282	+0.07%
2007	1,480	+1.81%
2012	1,400	−1.11%
2017	1,330	−1.02%
2023	1,390	+0.74%
Source: INSEE

== See also ==
- Communes of the Pyrénées-Orientales department
