= Ur, Pyrénées-Orientales =

Ur
- Commune
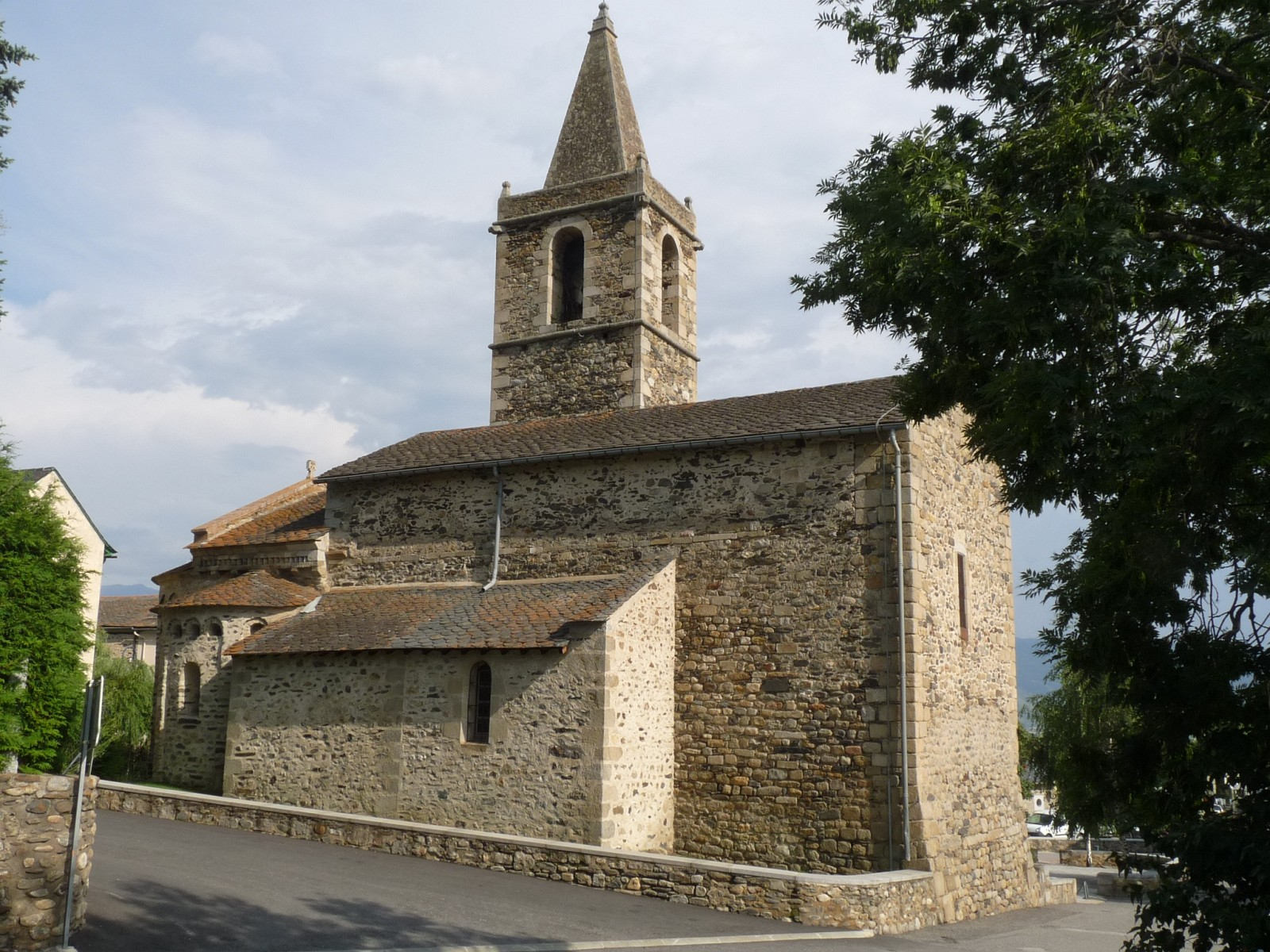
- The church of Saint-Martin, in Ur

- Coat of arms
- Location of Ur
- Location within France Location within Occitanie
- Coordinates: 42°27′46″N 1°56′18″E
- Country: France
- Region: Occitania
- Department: Pyrénées-Orientales
- Arrondissement: Prades
- Canton: Les Pyrénées catalanes
- Intercommunality: Pyrénées Cerdagne

Government
  - Mayor (2020–2026): Francis Gantou
- Area^{1}: 6.79 km^{2} (2.62 sq mi)
- Elevation: 1,250 m (4,100 ft)
- Highest elevation: 1,540 m (5,050 ft)
- Lowest elevation: 1,155 m (3,789 ft)
- Population (2023): 382
  - Density: 56.3/km^{2} (146/sq mi)
- Time zone: UTC+01:00 (CET)
  - Summer (DST): UTC+02:00 (CEST)
- INSEE/Postal code: 66218 /66760
- ^{1} French Land Register data, which excludes lakes, ponds, glaciers > 1 km^{2} (0.386 sq mi or 247 acres) and river estuaries.

Ur (French: [yʁ]; Catalan: Ur, [ur]) is a commune in the Pyrénées-Orientales department in southern France.

== Toponymy ==
The name of the village is attested in the form Hur as early as 839 AD, and is of pre-Indo-European origin, coming from the Ur-Or-Ar root - quite common in the Pyrenees - which designates a place where there is a spring or a river; the pre-Celtic root *Ur- still means "water" in Basque. Despite local folklore, there is no known relation to the city-state of Ur which is mentioned in the Bible.

== Geography ==
Ur is located in the canton of Les Pyrénées catalanes and in the arrondissement of Prades. Ur-Les Escaldes station has rail connections to Villefranche-de-Conflent and Latour-de-Carol.

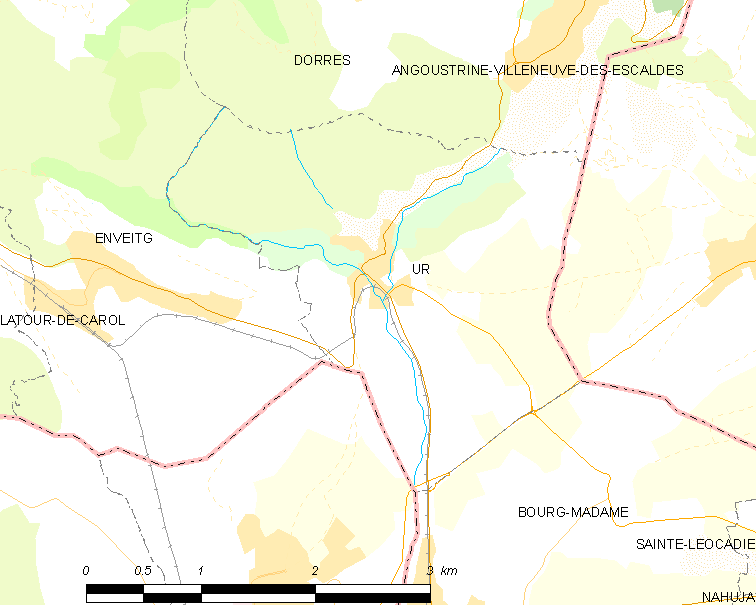
Map of Ur and its surrounding communes

== Population ==
Historical population
Year	Pop.	±% p.a.
1968	256	—
1975	272	+0.87%
1982	260	−0.64%
1990	269	+0.43%
1999	308	+1.52%
2007	332	+0.94%
2012	353	+1.23%
2017	363	+0.56%
2023	382	+0.85%
Source: INSEE

== See also ==
- Communes of the Pyrénées-Orientales department
