= Mont-Louis–La Cabanasse station =

Railway station in Mont-Louis, Pyrenées-Orientales, France

Mont-Louis–La Cabanasse
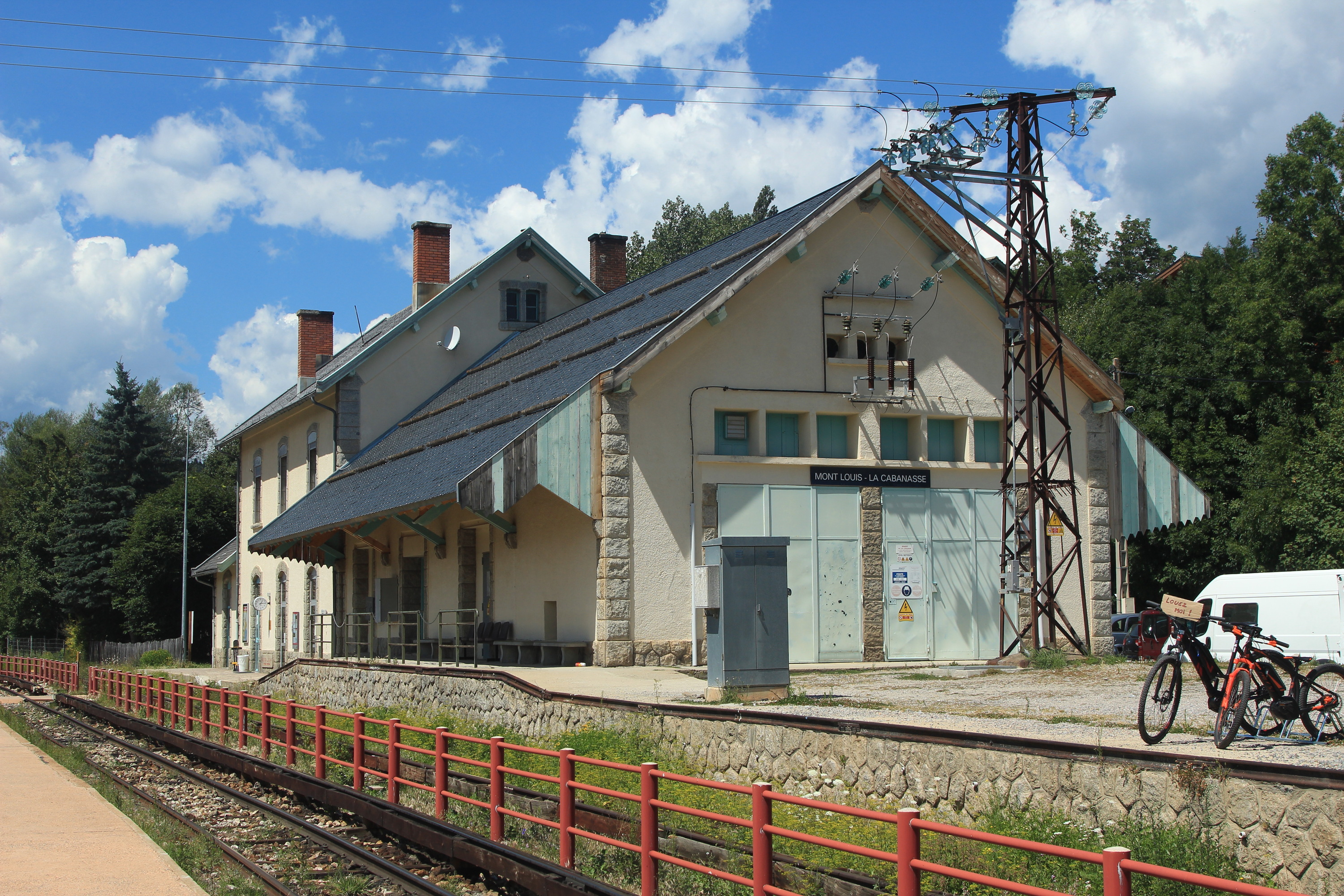
- Gare de Mont-Louis–La Cabanasse

General information
- Location: Mont-Louis, Occitanie, France
- Coordinates: 42.50209°N 2.11309°E
- Line: Ligne de Cerdagne

Other information
- Station code: 87784793

Services
Preceding station	TER Occitanie	Following station
Bolquère-Eyne towards Latour-de-Carol	32 (Ligne de Cerdagne)	Planès towards Villefranche–Vernet-les-Bains
Location

Mont-Louis–La Cabanasse is a railway station in Mont-Louis, Pyrenées-Orientales, southern France. Within TER Occitanie, it is part of line 32 (Latour-de-Carol-Enveitg–Villefranche-Vernet-les-Bains, Train Jaune).
