= Bolquère =

Bolquère Bolquera
- Commune
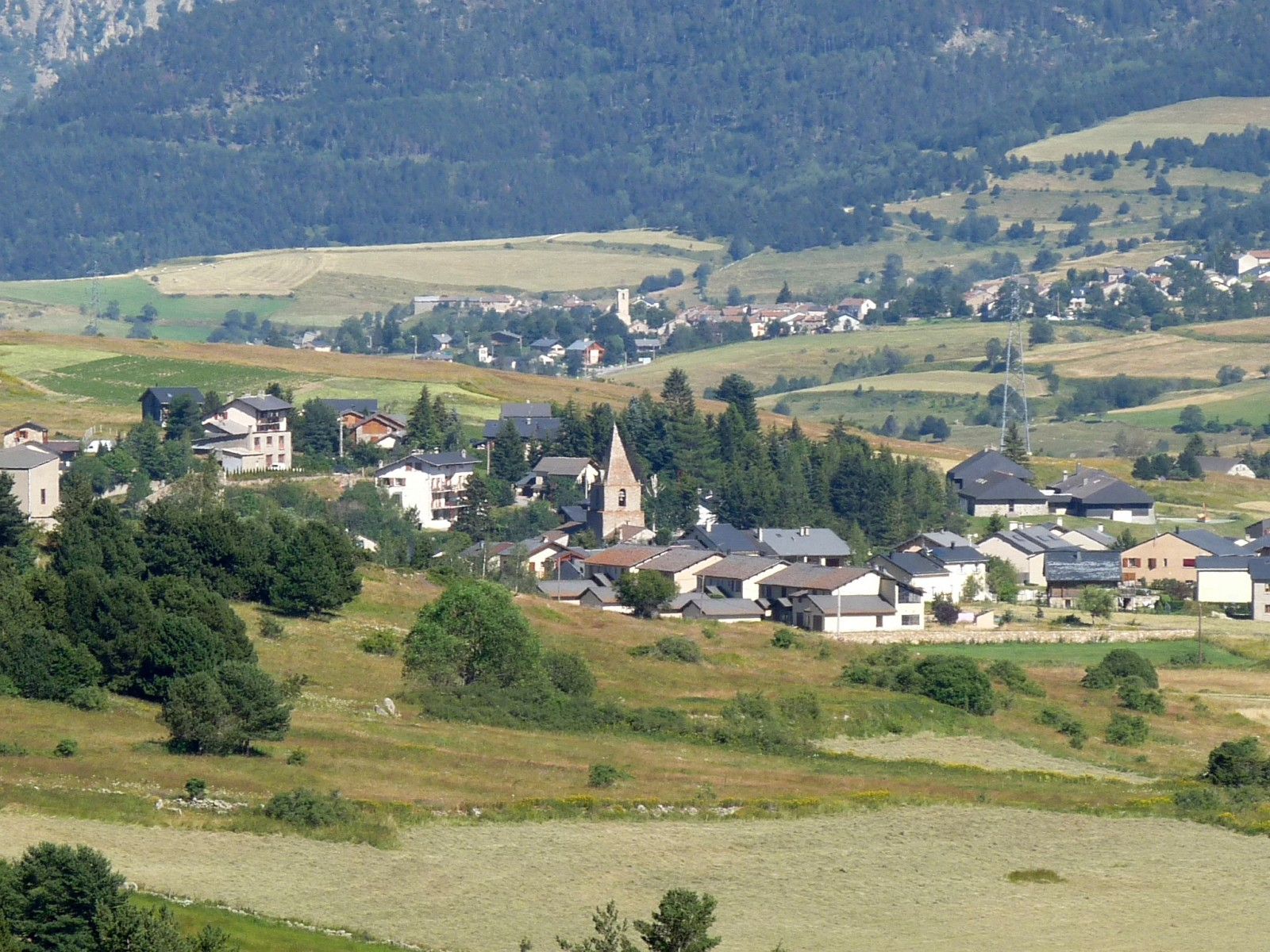
- Bolquère seen from Font-Romeu
- Location of Bolquère
- Location within France Location within Occitanie
- Coordinates: 42°30′14″N 2°04′40″E
- Country: France
- Region: Occitania
- Department: Pyrénées-Orientales
- Arrondissement: Prades
- Canton: Les Pyrénées catalanes
- Intercommunality: Pyrénées catalanes

Government
  - Mayor (2022–2026): Henri Baudet
- Area^{1}: 17.61 km^{2} (6.80 sq mi)
- Elevation: 1,613 m (5,292 ft)
- Highest elevation: 2,099 m (6,886 ft)
- Lowest elevation: 1,478 m (4,849 ft)
- Population (2023): 816
  - Density: 46.3/km^{2} (120/sq mi)
- Time zone: UTC+01:00 (CET)
  - Summer (DST): UTC+02:00 (CEST)
- INSEE/Postal code: 66020 /66210
- ^{1} French Land Register data, which excludes lakes, ponds, glaciers > 1 km^{2} (0.386 sq mi or 247 acres) and river estuaries.

Bolquère (French pronunciation: [bɔlkɛʁ]; Catalan: Bolquera) is a commune in the Pyrénées-Orientales department in southern France.

== Geography ==
=== Localization ===
Bolquère is located in the canton of Les Pyrénées catalanes and in the arrondissement of Prades.

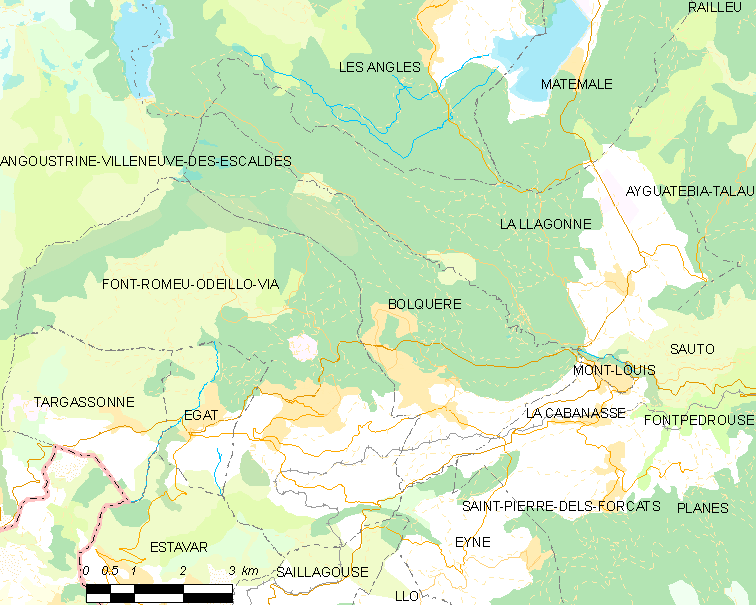
Map of Bolquère and its surrounding communes

=== Transportation ===
Bolquère-Eyne station is the highest railway station on the SNCF network at an elevation of 1593m [the highest SNCF station is the Gare du Lac at 1914m on the stand-alone Train de L' Artouste line]. It serves the Yellow Train exclusively.

== Government and politics ==
Mayors

Mayor	Term start	Term end
Pierre Patau	?	June 1815
Jean Inbern	June 1815	?
Raymond Guinovart	1983	1989
Jean-Pierre Abel	2001	2020
Jackie Coll	2020	incumbent

== Population ==
Historical population
Year	Pop.	±% p.a.
1968	249	—
1975	373	+5.94%
1982	503	+4.36%
1990	617	+2.59%
1999	730	+1.89%
2007	798	+1.12%
2012	781	−0.43%
2017	808	+0.68%
2023	816	+0.16%
Source: INSEE

== See also ==
- Communes of the Pyrénées-Orientales department
