= Saillagouse =

Saillagouse Sallagosa
- Commune
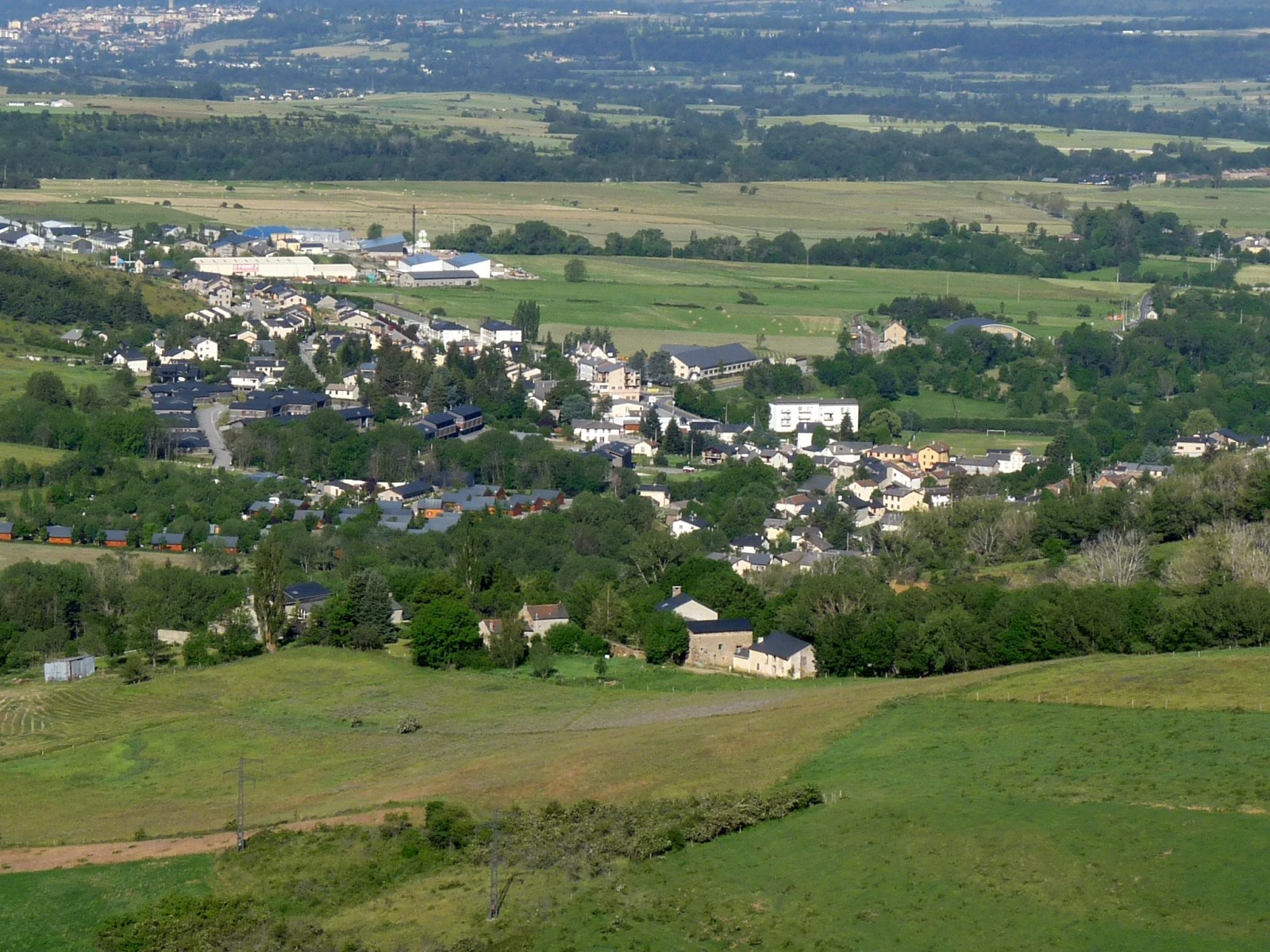
- A view of Saillagouse from the road between Eyne and Llo

- Coat of arms
- Location of Saillagouse
- Location within France Location within Occitanie
- Coordinates: 42°27′39″N 2°02′25″E
- Country: France
- Region: Occitania
- Department: Pyrénées-Orientales
- Arrondissement: Prades
- Canton: Les Pyrénées catalanes
- Intercommunality: Pyrénées Cerdagne

Government
  - Mayor (2020–2026): Georges Armengol
- Area^{1}: 11.35 km^{2} (4.38 sq mi)
- Elevation: 1,300 m (4,300 ft)
- Highest elevation: 2,160 m (7,090 ft)
- Lowest elevation: 1,230 m (4,040 ft)
- Population (2023): 1,155
  - Density: 101.8/km^{2} (263.6/sq mi)
- Time zone: UTC+01:00 (CET)
  - Summer (DST): UTC+02:00 (CEST)
- INSEE/Postal code: 66167 /66800
- ^{1} French Land Register data, which excludes lakes, ponds, glaciers > 1 km^{2} (0.386 sq mi or 247 acres) and river estuaries.

Saillagouse (French pronunciation: [sajaɡuz]; Catalan: Sallagosa) is a commune in the Pyrénées-Orientales department in southern France.

The inhabitants are called Saillagousains.

== Geography ==
Saillagouse is in the canton of Les Pyrénées catalanes and in the arrondissement of Prades. Saillagouse station has rail connections to Villefranche-de-Conflent and Latour-de-Carol.

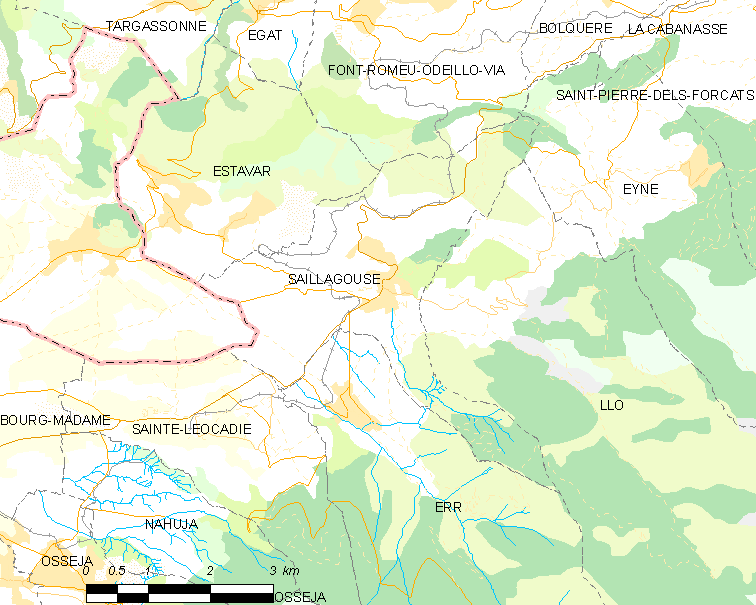
Map of Saillagouse and its surrounding communes

== Population ==
Historical population
Year	Pop.	±% p.a.
1968	728	—
1975	767	+0.75%
1982	763	−0.07%
1990	825	+0.98%
1999	820	−0.07%
2007	1,009	+2.63%
2012	1,052	+0.84%
2017	1,089	+0.69%
2023	1,155	+0.99%
Source: INSEE

== See also ==
- Communes of the Pyrénées-Orientales department
