= Serdinya =

Serdinya Serdinyà
- Commune
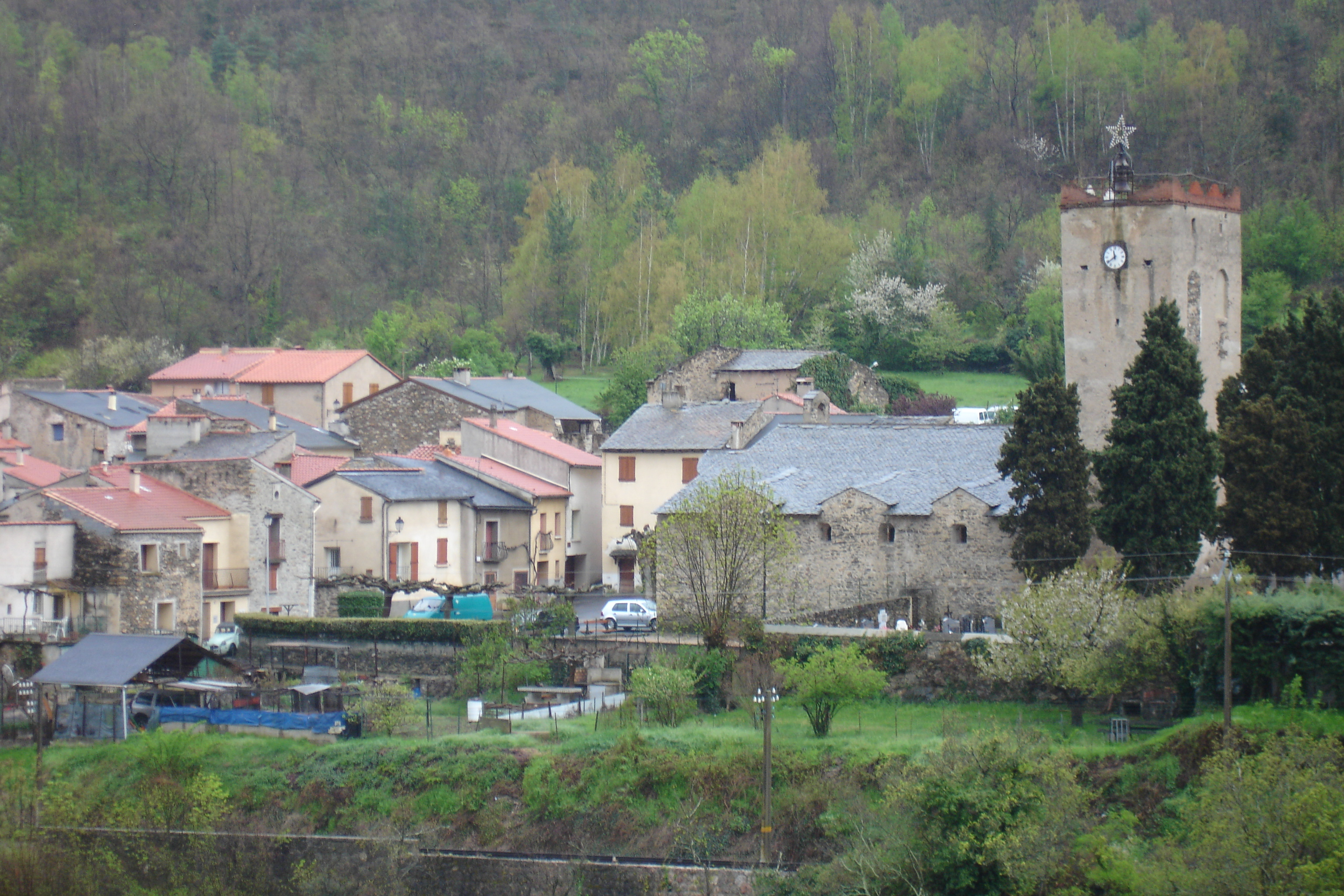
- Serdinya seen from Route nationale 116

- Coat of arms
- Location of Serdinya
- Location within France Location within Occitanie
- Coordinates: 42°34′08″N 2°19′20″E
- Country: France
- Region: Occitania
- Department: Pyrénées-Orientales
- Arrondissement: Prades
- Canton: Les Pyrénées catalanes
- Intercommunality: Conflent-Canigó

Government
  - Mayor (2020–2026): Jean-Marie Maydat
- Area^{1}: 16.91 km^{2} (6.53 sq mi)
- Elevation: 530 m (1,740 ft)
- Highest elevation: 1,792 m (5,879 ft)
- Lowest elevation: 449 m (1,473 ft)
- Population (2023): 236
  - Density: 14.0/km^{2} (36.1/sq mi)
- Time zone: UTC+01:00 (CET)
  - Summer (DST): UTC+02:00 (CEST)
- INSEE/Postal code: 66193 /66360
- ^{1} French Land Register data, which excludes lakes, ponds, glaciers > 1 km^{2} (0.386 sq mi or 247 acres) and river estuaries.

Serdinya (French pronunciation: [sɛʁdiɲa]; Catalan: Serdinyà) is a commune in the Pyrénées-Orientales department in southern France.

Residents are Serdinya are called Serdinyanais in French and Serdinyanencs in Catalan.

== Geography ==
=== Localisation ===
Serdinya is located in the canton of Les Pyrénées catalanes and in the arrondissement of Prades.

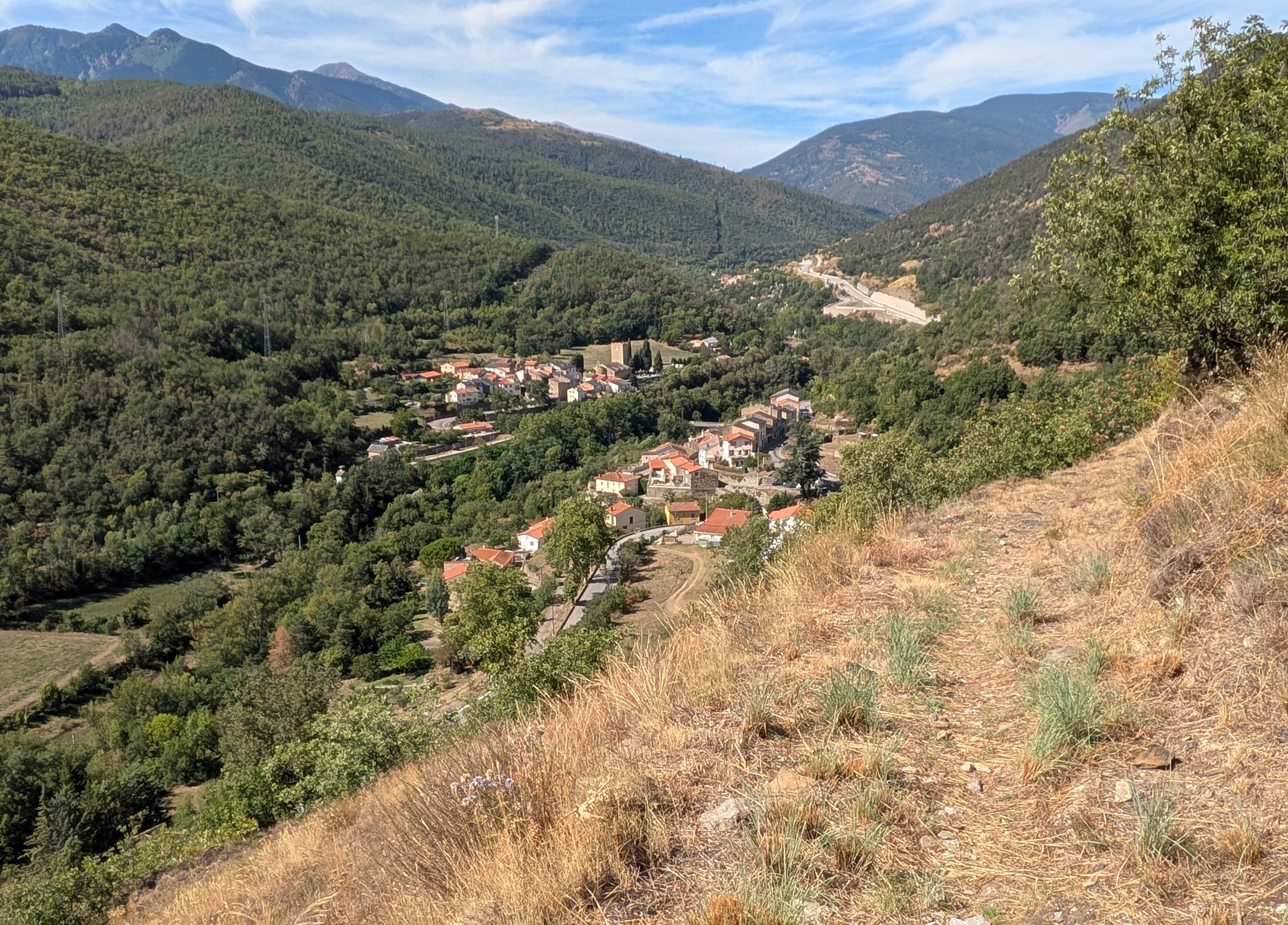
The village of Serdinya, in the Têt valley.

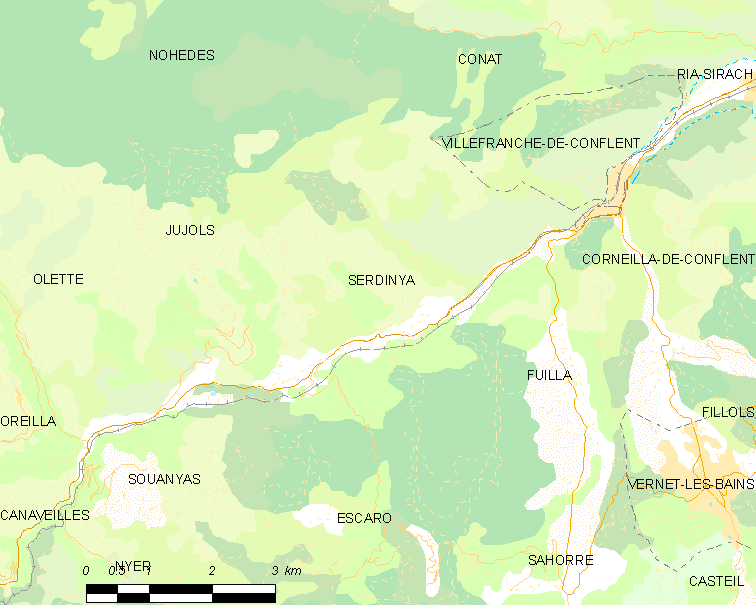
Map of Serdinya and its surrounding communes

=== Transport ===
Route nationale 116 (RN 116) connecting Perpignan and Bourg-Madame (near the Spanish and Andorran borders) passes through Serdinya. Serdinya station and Joncet station have rail connections to Villefranche-de-Conflent and Latour-de-Carol.

== Politics and administration ==
=== Municipal administration ===
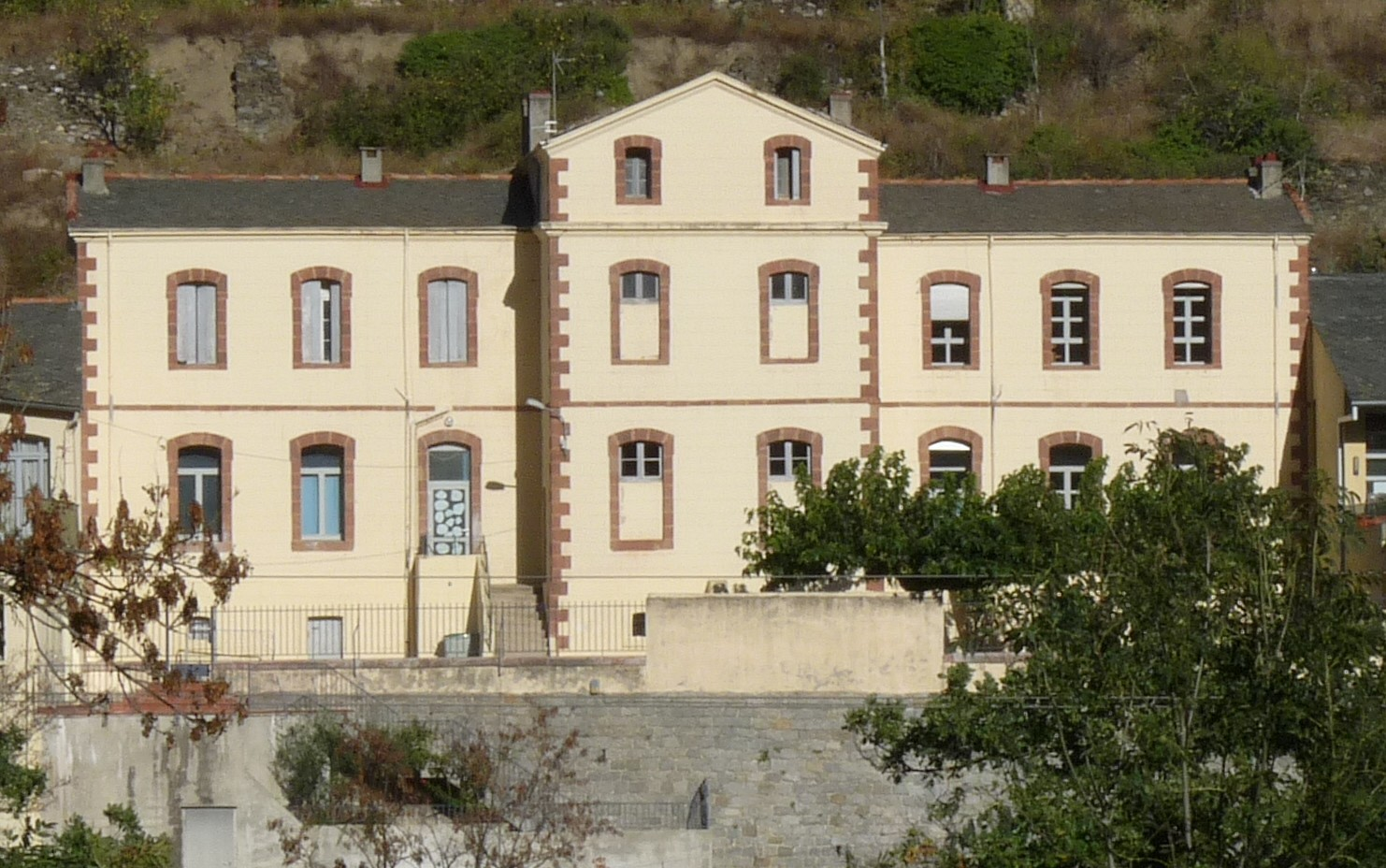
Serdinya town hall.

=== List of mayors ===
List of successive mayors of Serdinya
In office		Name	Party	Capacity	Ref.
March 1983	June 1995	Paul Maranges	DVD		
June 1995	Incumbent	Jean-Marie Maydat	PS		

== Population ==
Historical population
Year	Pop.	±% p.a.
1968	307	—
1975	271	−1.77%
1982	233	−2.14%
1990	213	−1.12%
1999	233	+1.00%
2007	220	−0.72%
2012	207	−1.21%
2017	246	+3.51%
2023	236	−0.69%
Source: INSEE

== See also ==
- Communes of the Pyrénées-Orientales department
