= Villefranche–Vernet-les-Bains station =

Railway station in Villefranche-de-Conflent, France

Villefranche–Vernet-les-Bains
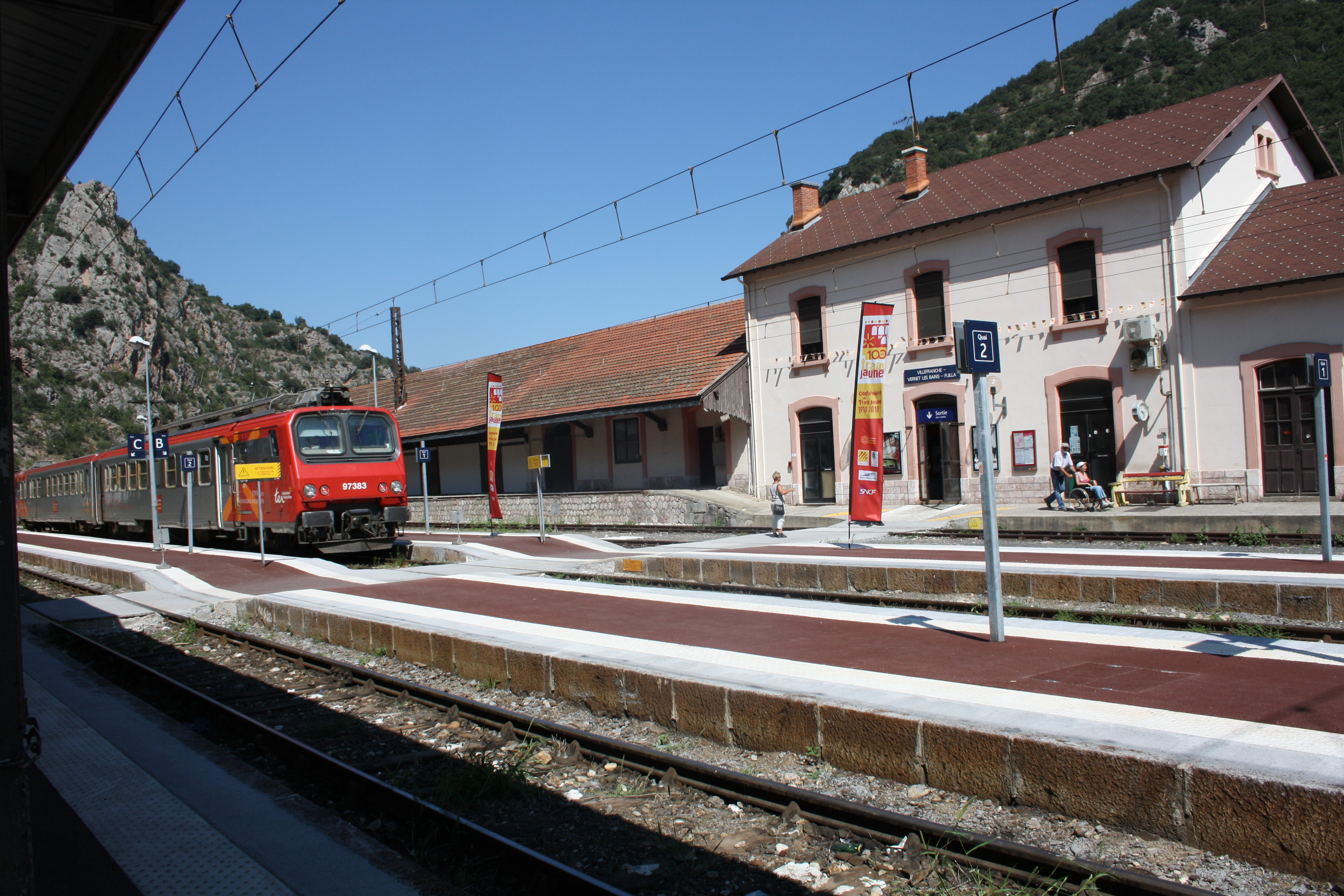
- Villefranche–Vernet-les-Bains Station

General information
- Location: Quartier de la Gare; 66500 Villefranche-de-Conflent; Pyrénées-Orientales; France
- Coordinates: 42.591626°N 2.369803°E
- Elevation: 427 metres (1,401 ft)
- Owner: SNCF
- Operator: SNCF
- Lines: Ligne de Cerdagne; Perpignan–Villefranche-Vernet-les-Bains railway

Other information
- Station code: 87784686

History
- Opened: 2 June 1895

Services
Preceding station	TER Occitanie	Following station
Terminus	24	Ria towards Perpignan
Serdinya towards Latour-de-Carol	32 (Ligne de Cerdagne)	Terminus
Location

Villefranche–Vernet-les-Bains is a railway station in Villefranche-de-Conflent and about 5 km from Vernet-les-Bains, Occitanie, southern France. Within TER Occitanie, it is part of lines 24 (Villefranche–Vernet-les-Bains↔Perpignan) and 32 (Latour-de-Carol-Enveitg↔Villefranche–Vernet-les-Bains).

== See also ==
- List of SNCF stations in Occitanie
