= René Fontayne =

French painter

- Born: 3 January 1891; Vergèze, France
- Died: 17 September 1952 (aged 61); Vergèze, France
- Known for: Painting

René Fontayne (born 1891 in Vergèze, died 1952 in Vergèze), was a French painter and illustrator.

== Biography ==
René Fontayne's artistic career began to take off during the fertile period between the two world wars. Born in Vergèze, in the Gard, on 3 January 1891, he graduated from the École Municipale des Beaux-Arts de Nîmes in 1910, and in 1912 went to Paris on a national scholarship to further his talent as a painter and decorative artist, a talent that would come to be especially active and appreciated in the field of decorative arts. His first-known works date from the start of the 1920s. Fontayne expressed an early fondness for detailed drawing, particularly evident in his still lifes. The artist simply and directly arranges the elements against a uniform background. The same economy of means is also seen in his early landscapes, which suggest a figurative Cubism like that taught by André Lothe in the academy he founded in 1921 in the Rue d’Odessa.

=== Paris and Brittany ===
The year 1929 marks a turning point in Fontayne's career. At his initial appearance at the Salon des Indépendants, his decorative compositions sparked interest from the Galerie Simonson in Paris, which offered the artist his first solo show in April of the same year. For his Paris debut, Fontayne immediately demonstrated his fondness for landscape. His search for subjects led him to the basilica at Vézelay and to the Limousin for views of Uzerche and Crozant, as Armand Guillaumin had done before him. Along the Vézère, flowing through the Corrèze and Périgord, Fontayne captured the reflections of the houses in the water, the subject of one painting acquired by the French government in 1928 at the 19th Exposition de l’Éclectique.

Between 1931 and 1933 Fontayne, now in great demand, took part in a range of group shows in Paris.13 The exhibition ‘Artistes Protestants Modernes’, which featured, along with Fontayne, such renowned artists as Raoul Dufy, Gérard Sandoz, Jacques-Émile Ruhlmann, Jean Dunand, Le Corbusier and Jean Jeanneret, questioned the identity of a specifically French Protestant art. The restraint of Fontayne's compositions clearly resonated with this philosophy, like the rigour that pervades the lines of the Art Deco furniture and modernist architecture.

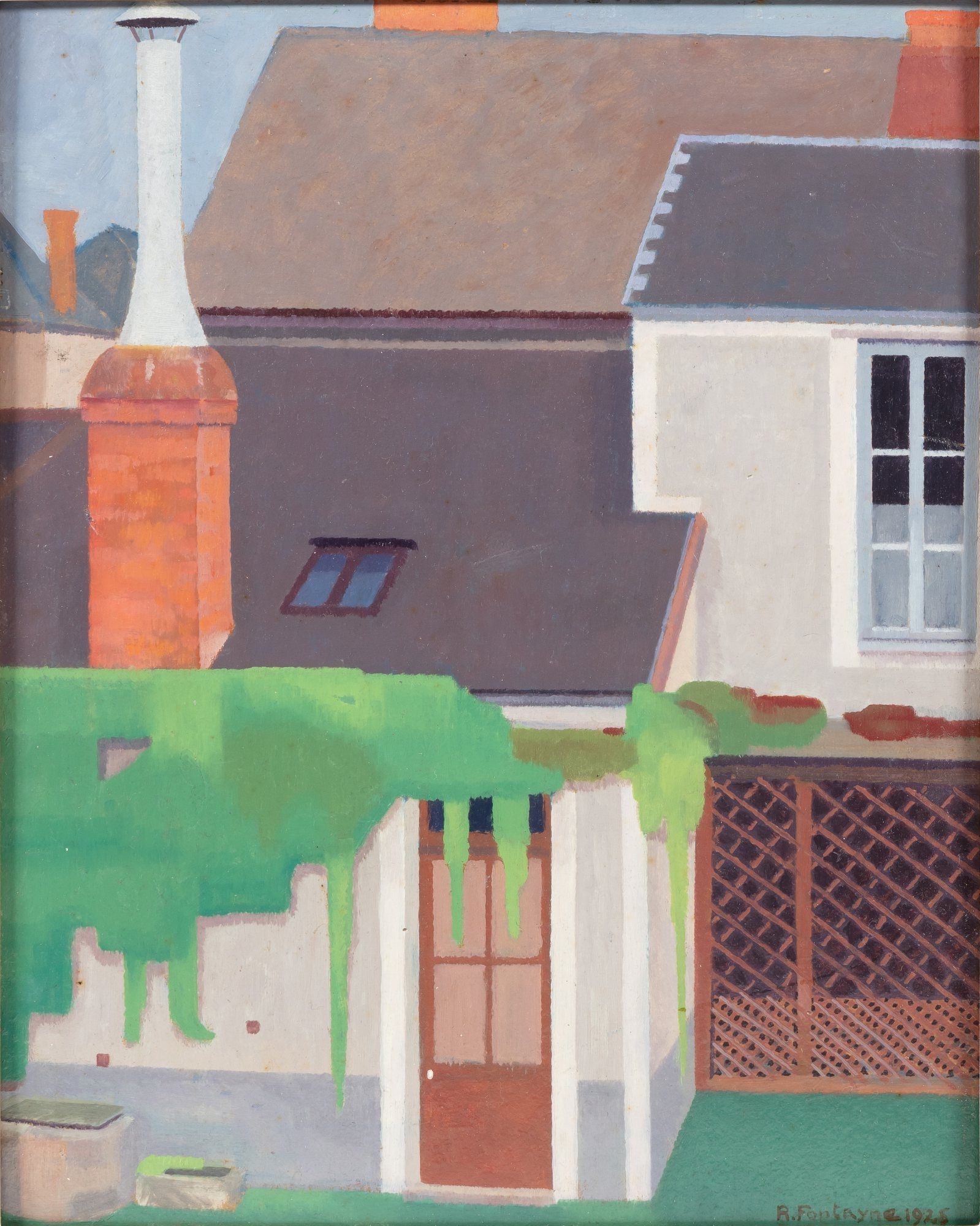
"L’arrière-cour" by René Fontayne (1925)

=== Fontayne and the Art Deco style ===
His several watercolours reveal a sensitive study of light, for example those of the Jardin du Luxembourg in Paris, where he sketched the park's regular visitors and, with sharp observation of nature, produced some tree studies. An easel painter, Fontayne was also a recognised interior designer, fully involved in the Art Deco movement launched at Paris's Exposition Internationale des Arts Décoratifs of 1925. His first essays in this style were large decorative panels, similar to that exhibited at the 1932 Salon des Indépendants. An easel painter, Fontayne was also a recognised interior designer, fully involved in the Art Deco movement launched at Paris's Exposition Internationale des Arts Décoratifs of 1925. His first essays in this style were large decorative panels, similar to that exhibited at the 1932 Salon des Indépendants. He also composed a number of other similar decorative panels such as he showed at the 22nd Salon de la Société des Artistes Décorateurs of Paris (Paris, Grand Palais). The 1932 Salon de la Société des Artistes Décorateurs saw the creation of the Study Committee to organise the 1937 Exposition Internationale des Arts et Techniques. Fontayne won the competition to design the décor of the National Pavilion for ‘Mobilier et des Ensembles Mobiliers’ (Furniture and Furniture Sets)’. For this prestigious location, the French government commissioned Fontayne to produce a vast ceiling, no longer extant, like most of the design features created for this event. In section 38 of the show, Fontayne exhibited, on the stand of the Barbès Gallery, which represented the artist, the complete décor of a Salon-Boudoir in a harmonious pale-green hue. This set is made up of rosewood furniture, wall lamps and two decorative paintings. Here Fontayne acts as a professional interior designer, just like a Jacques-Émile Ruhlmann, with whom he had exhibited six years earlier.

=== Fontayne's teaching ===
Fontayne’s varied gifts and accomplishments as painter and designer naturally led him to teaching. In 1931 he was appointed professor of decorative compositions at the École Nationale Supérieure des Arts et Industries Textiles de Roubaix. A dedicated teacher who took his mission seriously, Fontayne had his students participate in the different decorative projects under his direction. This is how, starting in 1931, a small group formed around him that was responsible for the decorative scheme of the main staircase designed for the new town hall of Vincennes. The building was inaugurated in 1935. Five years later, he had his students at the École des Arts Appliqués de Paris create the sets and costumes for Mon oncle Benjamin, a musical comedy by Francis Bousquet. Fontayne had been appointed to the post of professor of manufactured fabrics at the school in 1940. In the 1940s Fontayne preferred to exhibit regularly at the Salon des Indépendants, rather than at the other Parisian salons. Remaining faithful to his Vieilles maisons in the Périgord and Aveyron, the painter continued to show Languedoc landscapes and paintings of flowers until 1950. Less productive as the years passed – he rarely exhibited more than two works per salon after 1940 – in 1942 Fontayne answered the call of the landscape painter André Dauchez, who invited him to take part in the first ever National Indépendant show, a salon that broke with the official shows.

=== Main exhibitions ===
In 1942 the Galerie Bailly and later, in 1946, the Galerie Allard made themselves available to Fontayne. In 1943, the Musée d’Art Moderne de la Ville de Paris invited the artist to take part in a group show. Due final homage was paid to Fontayne during his lifetime, this time from his profession, with a solo show at the Maison des Artistes, in October 1947. René Fontayne died five years later, on 17 September 1952, in the modest village of his birth, Vergèze, from which he drew the noble simplicity of his art. Two years later the Galerie Van Ryck in Paris devoted a retrospective to his landscapes painted in southern France that featured forty-five canvases, inspired by his travels in the Gard, Aude, Aveyron and Tarn.

== Exhibitions ==
(non-exhaustive list)

- René Fontayne - 20 October - 10 November 1933, Nouvelle Galerie Simonson, Paris
- Rétrospective René Fontayne - 1954, Galerie Van Ryck, Paris
- French Naturalist Painters 1890-1950 - 12 June - 7 July 2012, The Fleming Collection, London
