= La Bastide-de-Bousignac =

Commune in Occitanie, France

- Commune
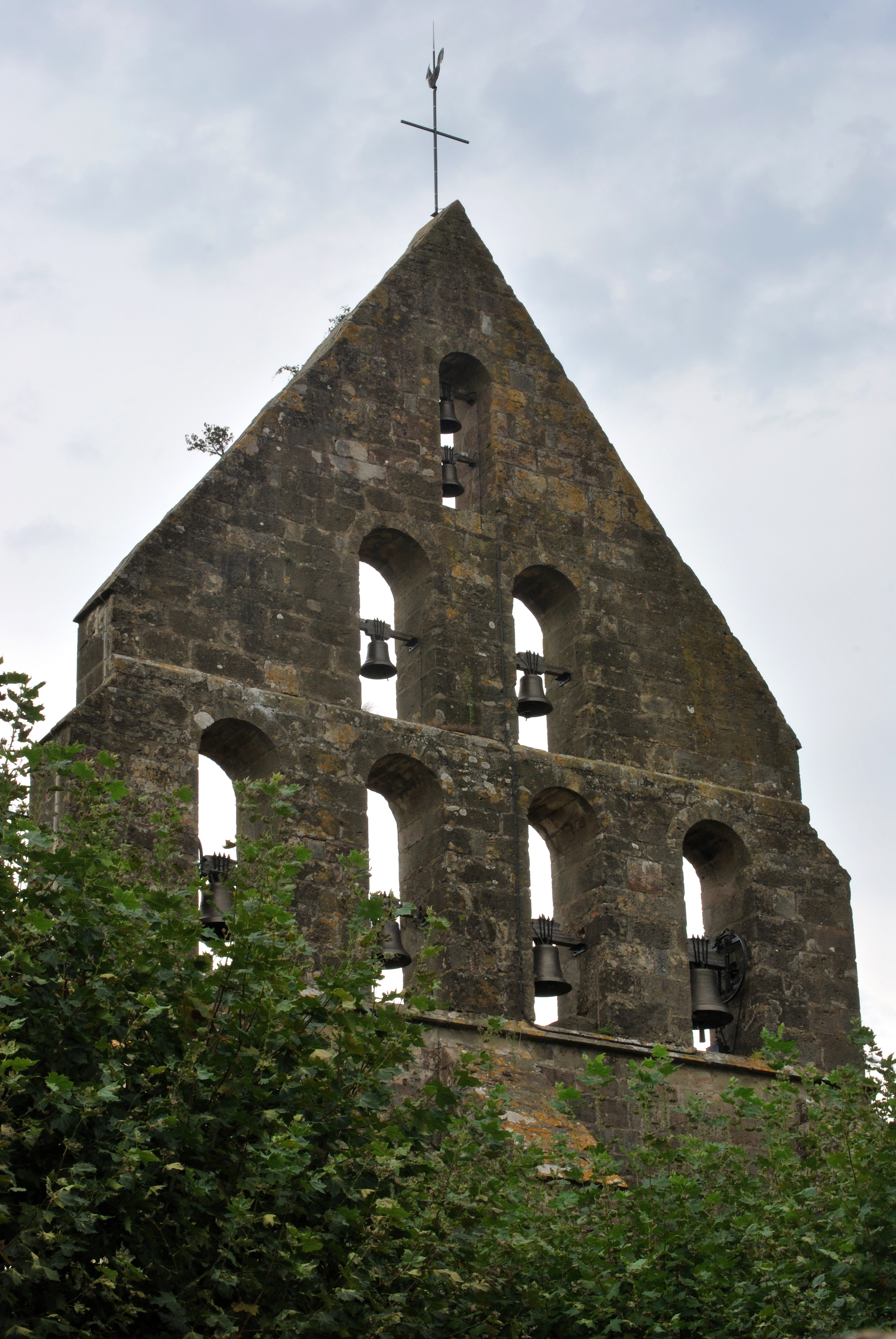
- The bell tower in La Bastide-de-Bousignac

- Coat of arms
- Location of La Bastide-de-Bousignac
- Location within France Location within Occitanie
- Coordinates: 43°03′17″N 1°53′10″E
- Country: France
- Region: Occitania
- Department: Ariège
- Arrondissement: Pamiers
- Canton: Mirepoix
- Intercommunality: Pays de Mirepoix

Government
  - Mayor (2020–2026): Alain Simorre
- Area^{1}: 12.53 km^{2} (4.84 sq mi)
- Elevation: 326 m (1,070 ft)
- Highest elevation: 500 m (1,600 ft)
- Lowest elevation: 310 m (1,020 ft)
- Population (2023): 331
  - Density: 26.4/km^{2} (68.4/sq mi)
- Time zone: UTC+01:00 (CET)
  - Summer (DST): UTC+02:00 (CEST)
- INSEE/Postal code: 09039 /09500
- ^{1} French Land Register data, which excludes lakes, ponds, glaciers > 1 km^{2} (0.386 sq mi or 247 acres) and river estuaries.

La Bastide-de-Bousignac (French pronunciation: [la bastid də buziɲak]; Occitan: La Bastida de Bosinhac) is a commune in the Ariège department in the Occitanie region of south-western France.

== Geography ==
La Bastide-de-Bousignac is located just 3 km south of Mirepoix and 2 km north of Saint-Quentin-la-Tour. Access to the commune is by the D625 road from Mirepoix which passes through the centre of the commune and the village and continues south to Saint-Quentin-la-Tour. The D7 goes east from the village to Lagarde. The D7A goes south-west from the village to Saint-Julien-de-Gras-Capou. The D78 comes from Saint-Julien-de-Gras-Capou in the south and passes north through the western arm of the commune continuing to join the D13 south of Besset. The commune is mixed farmland and forest.

The Countirou river flows from the south through the centre of the commune and the village and continues north to join the Hers at Mirepoix. The Ruisseau de Gradal rises in the east of the commune and flows west to join the Countirou north of the village. The Ruisseau de Mazeroles flows through the western arm of the commune from south to north continuing north to join the Hers at Besset.

== History ==
La Bastide-de-Bousignac appears as la Baftide de Bouzujnac on the 1750 Cassini Map and as la Baftide on the 1790 version.

== Administration ==
List of Successive Mayors

From	To	Name
1790	1792	Jean Lanta
1792	1794	Jean Boudouresque
1794	1798	Jean Pilles
1798	1815	Joseph Boudouresque
1815	1824	Baptiste Fidency
1824	1830	Maurice Boudouresque
1830	1847	François Authie
1847	1865	François Boudouresque
1865	1870	Jean Baptiste Authie
1870	1871	François Boudouresque
1871	1877	Jean Baptiste Authie
1877	1909	Maurice Boudouresque
1909	1920	Noël Authie
1920	1929	Jules Sénié
1929	1947	Joseph Henri Elie Cassagne
1947	2014	Roger Sénié
2014	2020	Grégory Balard
2020	2026	Alain Simorre

In February 2013 Roger Senie announces he would not stand in 2014. In July 2013 he was reelected mayor after resigning in protest against the forced inclusion of La Bastide-de-Bousignac into the community of communes of the Pays de Mirepoix. Serving from 1947 to 2014, he was the oldest mayor in France equally with Arthur Richier, the mayor of Faucon-du-Caire in Alpes-de-Haute-Provence. who, like him, did not stand in March 2014.

== Demography ==
The inhabitants of the commune are known as Bousignacois or Bousignacoises in French.

Historical population

Year	Pop.	±% p.a.
1793	454	—
1821	460	+0.05%
1846	516	+0.46%
1872	449	−0.53%
1901	355	−0.81%
1921	272	−1.32%
1946	267	−0.07%
1962	276	+0.21%
1968	251	−1.57%

Year	Pop.	±% p.a.
1975	248	−0.17%
1982	296	+2.56%
1990	311	+0.62%
1999	327	+0.56%
2007	333	+0.23%
2012	338	+0.30%
2017	338	+0.00%
2023	331	−0.35%

Source: EHESS and INSEE

== Culture and heritage ==
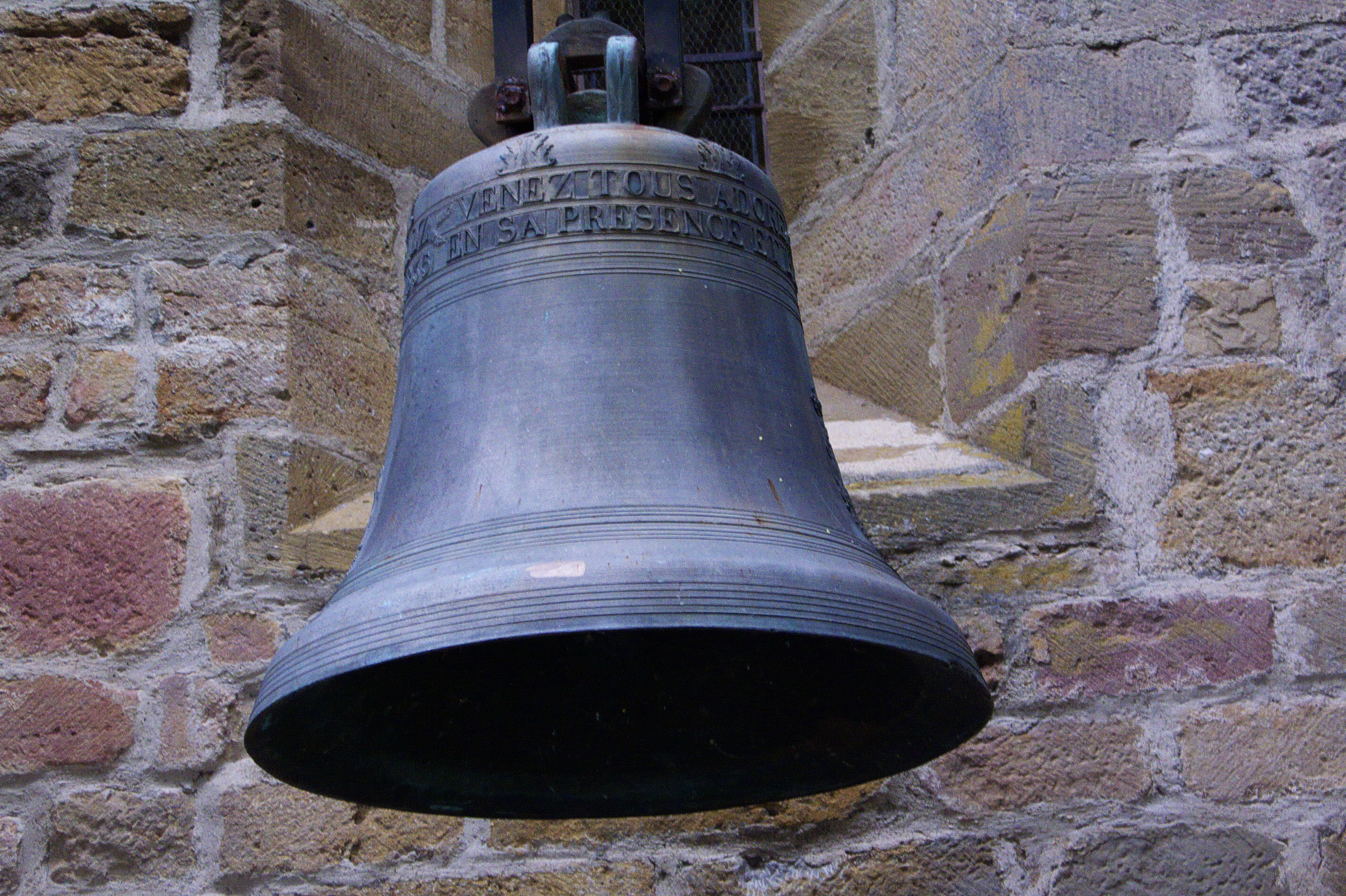
The Church Bell

=== Religious heritage ===
- The Church Bell (Middle Ages) is registered as an historical monument.

== Notable people linked to the commune ==
- Pierre Espert de Sibra (1771–1835), General of the armies of the Republic and the Empire, died in the hamlet of Balach.
- Roger Sénié (born in 1921), Mayor of the commune from 1947 to 2014

== See also ==
- Communes of the Ariège department
