= Roger Sénié =

French politician (1920–2021)

Mayor of La Bastide-de-Bousignac
- In office 26 October 1947 – 4 April 2014
- Preceded by: Joseph Henri Élie Cassagne
- Succeeded by: Grégory Balard

General Councilor of the Canton of Mirepoix
- In office 28 April 1954 – 15 March 1964
- Preceded by: Urbain Rouch
- Succeeded by: Gilbert Faure

Personal details
- Born: 19 July 1920 Aigues-Vives, France
- Died: 11 September 2021 (aged 101)
- Party: RPR; UMP

Roger Sénié (19 July 1920 – 11 September 2021) was a French politician. He served as Mayor of La Bastide-de-Bousignac from 1947 to 2014 as a member of the Rally for the Republic (RPR) and the Union for a Popular Movement (UMP). In 2014, he was the oldest mayor in France alongside Arthur Richier.

== Biography ==
Sénié succeeded his former schoolteacher as Mayor of La Bastide-de-Bousignac in 1947. His grandfather had served as Mayor from 1920 to 1929. In 2001, Jean Cazal, one of Sénié's municipal councilors since 1977, set up a rival coalition and put his re-election campaign in doubt. However, Sénié remained victorious, winning 65% of the vote.

In 2008, Sénié was re-elected for the 11th time. However, the election results were annulled by Toulouse administrative tribunal on 6 June 2008. The elections took place again on 20 July, resulting in a victory for Sénié with 66% of the vote. On 15 June 2013, he, along with the rest of the municipal council, resigned in protest of the prefecture's decision to include La Bastide-de-Bousignac in the Communauté de communes du Pays de Mirepoix, which would cause the commune to lose €145,000 in annual tax revenue. He then began a hunger strike. He was elected back into office on 21 July 2013. He did not stand for re-election in 2014.

Roger Sénié died on 11 September 2021 at the age of 101.
