= Aigues-Vives tramway =

Historic French narrow-gauge railway

Coordinates: 43.727917°N 4.191845°E

Chemin de Fer d’Aigues-Vives
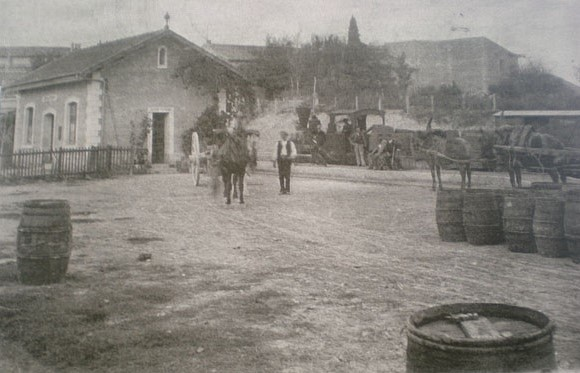
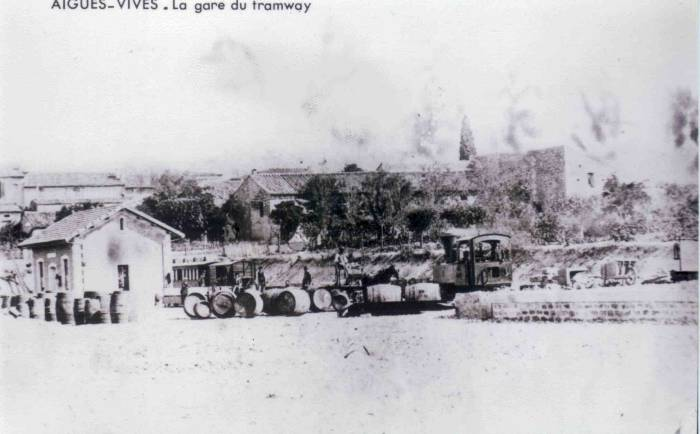
- Weidknecht locomotive at station in the village of Aigues-Vives Wine barrels and mixed passenger and goods train in the village

Technical
- Line length: 6 kilometres (3.7 mi)
- Track gauge: 600 mm (1 ft 11 5/8 in)
Route map
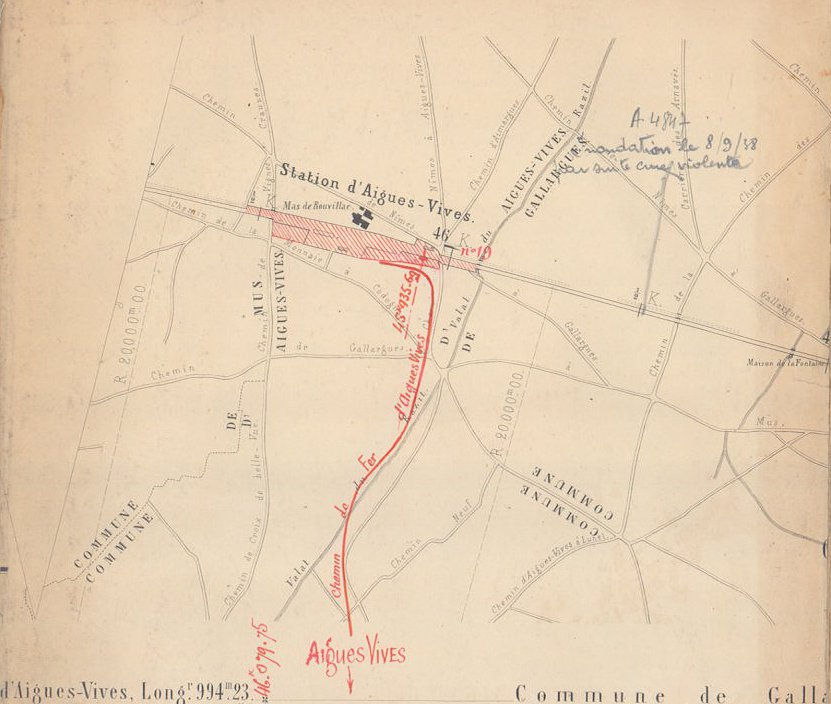
Terminus at PLM station on a historic map (North is downwards)
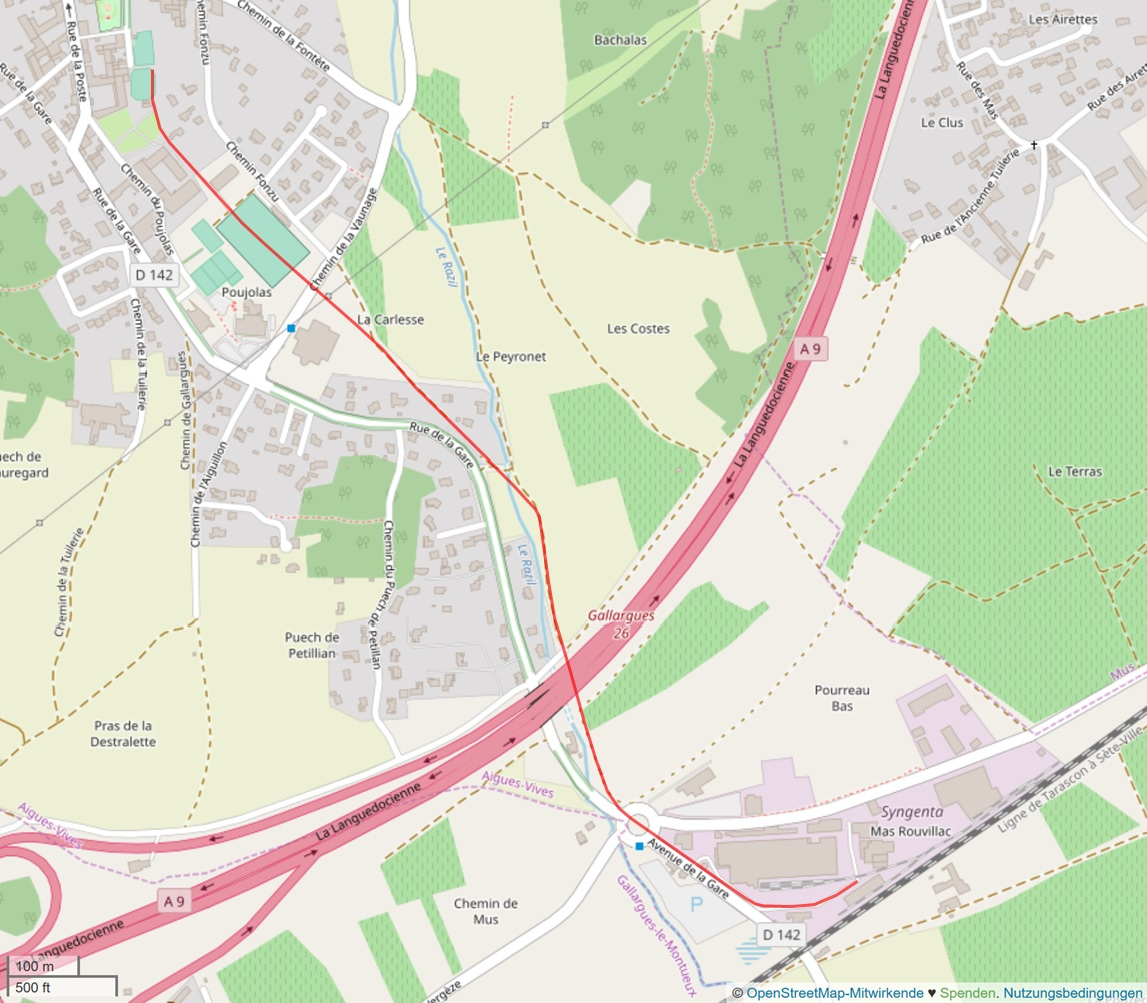
Former route of the tramway on a modern map

The Aigues-Vives tramway (French Chemin de Fer d'Aigues-Vives-Bourg a Aigues-Vives PLM or colloquially La Lignette) was a 2 km (1.2 mi) long narrow-gauge railway with a gauge of 600 mm (1 ft 11 5/8 in) in Aigues-Vives in the department Gard in Southern France. It operated from 1892 to 1901.

== History ==
=== Planning ===
The secondary railway with a gauge of 600 mm (1 ft 11 5/8 in) connected the Aigues-Vives station^{(fr)} on the Nîmes-Lunel line of the Chemins de fer de Paris à Lyon et à la Méditerranée (PLM) with the local fruit processing companies. The companies produced mainly wine, jams and fruit syrups as well as wooden barrels for the transport of these fruit products.

Gard's member of the National Assembly, Émile Jamais, who was born in Aigues-Vives, belonged to the railway committee that was set-up in June 1886 for obtaining the concession. This explains why the committee was well acquainted with the laws governing the construction of narrow-gauge railways and the necessary application procedure. The concession for the local railway was awarded in 1891 to the Societe Nationale des Chemins de Fer a Voie Etroite (national state-owned company for narrow-gauge railways) and three Parisian investors, who immediately began construction work.

=== Construction ===
The final route and transportation tariffs were approved in 1891. The railway was completed in early 1892 and officially opened on 18 June 1892. The 1697 m long single-track route ran from a square in the village to the station of the PLM on a 3.20 m wide route.

=== Operation ===
According to the time table, four trains with one passenger car per day were used for mixed passenger and freight traffic in each direction. The local traders were obliged to transport all the goods they bought or sold by train. In the last years of the 19th century, more than 40 companies, some of which were very significant, were active in wholesale or barrique wine trade. At this time, Aigues-Vives' economic prosperity peaked. Later the wine was increasingly bottled in the consumer countries, whereby the direct transport from the winery was made much easier initially with wooden wine barrel wagons and later with steel tank wagons. Thereupon the coopers and finally the wine wholesalers gradually disappeared, so that the transport volume decreased.

The original concessionaire was the Compagnie Nationale de Chemins de Fer a Voie Etroite with effect from 1891. This was a short-lived enterprise working out of a luxury hotel in Paris, probably just speculators. The Conseil Municipal took the project forward. The Société Cévenole du Chemin de Fer d'Aigues-Vives-Bourg a Aigues-Vives PLM operated the line since 1897.

=== Closure ===
On 5 February 1901, the business was closed due to financial difficulties. On 28 March 1901, the company was dissolved due to the accumulated deficit. The disused route was dismantled, only the small bridges were initially preserved, and parts of the route were used as a dirt road that runs almost parallel to Rue de la Gare, which leads from the village to the train station. Later, the site of the former narrow-gauge railway station in the village was used from 1931 as a bullring and as a fairground.

== Rail vehicles ==
- No. 1 and No. 2: Two three-axle 0-4-2 Weidknecht steam locomotives from (works numbers 568 and 569, delivered in 1892).
- A two-axle 0-4-0 Orenstein & Koppel steam locomotive (same type as the locomotive of the sand pits in Nemours)
- Open and covered Decauville freight wagons
