= Bernis =

Commune in Occitanie, France

- Commune
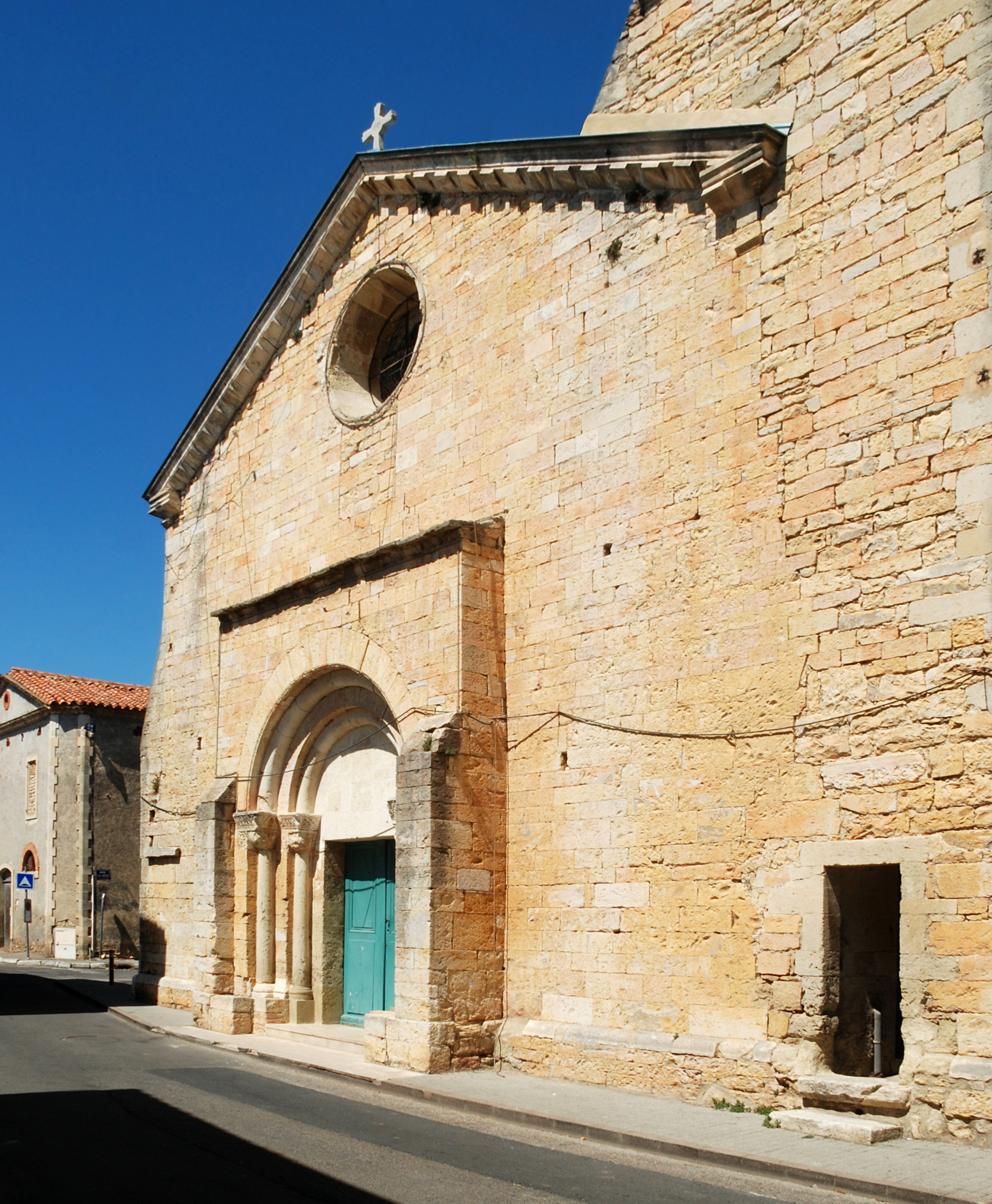
- The church in Bernis
- Location of Bernis
- Location within France Location within Occitanie
- Coordinates: 43°45′59″N 4°17′12″E
- Country: France
- Region: Occitania
- Department: Gard
- Arrondissement: Nîmes
- Canton: Vauvert
- Intercommunality: CA Nîmes Métropole

Government
  - Mayor (2020–2026): Théos Granchi
- Area^{1}: 12.8 km^{2} (4.9 sq mi)
- Elevation: 12 m (39 ft)
- Highest elevation: 101 m (331 ft)
- Lowest elevation: 16 m (52 ft)
- Population (2023): 3,286
  - Density: 257/km^{2} (665/sq mi)
- Time zone: UTC+01:00 (CET)
  - Summer (DST): UTC+02:00 (CEST)
- INSEE/Postal code: 30036 /30620
- ^{1} French Land Register data, which excludes lakes, ponds, glaciers > 1 km^{2} (0.386 sq mi or 247 acres) and river estuaries.

Bernis (French pronunciation: [bɛʁnis]; Occitan: Berniç) is a commune in the Gard department in southern France.

== Population ==
Historical population
Year	Pop.	±% p.a.
1968	1,081	—
1975	1,480	+4.59%
1982	2,220	+5.96%
1990	2,502	+1.51%
1999	2,657	+0.67%
2007	3,021	+1.62%
2012	3,209	+1.21%
2017	3,420	+1.28%
2023	3,286	−0.66%
Source: INSEE

== See also ==
- Costières de Nîmes AOC
- Communes of the Gard department
