= Canton of Vauvert =

Administrative division of the Gard department, France

Coordinates: 43.69°N 4.28°E

The canton of Vauvert is an administrative division of the Gard department, southern France. Its borders were modified at the French canton reorganisation which came into effect in March 2015. Its seat is in Vauvert.

It consists of the following communes:

1. Aigues-Vives
2. Aubord
3. Beauvoisin
4. Bernis
5. Codognan
6. Mus
7. Uchaud
8. Vauvert
9. Vergèze
10. Vestric-et-Candiac
