= Communauté de communes de Petite-Camargue =

Federation of municipalities in France

Coordinates: 43.6887°N 4.2748°E

Petite-Camargue
- Communauté de communes
- Country: France
- Region: Occitania
- Department: Gard
- No. of communes: {{{nbcomm}}}
- Established: November 2001

Government
  - President: André Brundu
- Area: 203.59 km^{2} (78.61 sq mi)
- Population (2018): 26,997
  - Density: 132.60/km^{2} (343.44/sq mi)
- Website: www.petitecamargue.fr

The Communauté de communes de Petite-Camargue is a federation of municipalities (communauté de communes) in the Gard département and in the Occitanie région of France. Its seat is Vauvert. Its area is 203.6 km^{2}, and its population was 26,997 in 2018.

== Composition ==
The communauté de communes consists of the following 5 communes:

1. Aimargues
2. Aubord
3. Beauvoisin
4. Le Cailar
5. Vauvert

== Administration ==
=== Presidents ===
- Jean Denat, (PS, 2001–2002)
- Reine Bouvier (Divers gauche, 2002–2014)
- Jean-Paul Franc (independent politician, 2014–2020)
- André Brundu (2020–)

== See also ==
- Communes of the Gard department
