= Vestric-et-Candiac =

- Commune
- Coat of arms
- Location of Vestric-et-Candiac
- Location within France Location within Occitanie
- Coordinates: 43°44′28″N 4°15′35″E
- Country: France
- Region: Occitania
- Department: Gard
- Arrondissement: Nîmes
- Canton: Vauvert
- Intercommunality: Rhôny Vistre Vidourle

Government
  - Mayor (2020–2026): Jean-François Laurent
- Area^{1}: 10.92 km^{2} (4.22 sq mi)
- Elevation: 16 m (52 ft)
- Highest elevation: 83 m (272 ft)
- Lowest elevation: 12 m (39 ft)
- Population (2023): 1,354
  - Density: 124.0/km^{2} (321.1/sq mi)
- Time zone: UTC+01:00 (CET)
  - Summer (DST): UTC+02:00 (CEST)
- INSEE/Postal code: 30347 /30600
- ^{1} French Land Register data, which excludes lakes, ponds, glaciers > 1 km^{2} (0.386 sq mi or 247 acres) and river estuaries.

Vestric-et-Candiac (French pronunciation: [vɛstʁik e kɑ̃djak]; Occitan: Vestric e Candiac) is a commune in the Gard department in southern France.

== Geography ==
=== Climate ===
Vestric-et-Candiac has a hot-summer Mediterranean climate (Köppen climate classification Csa). The average annual temperature in Vestric-et-Candiac is 14.9 °C (58.8 °F). The average annual rainfall is 700.5 mm (27.58 in) with October as the wettest month. The temperatures are highest on average in July, at around 24.1 °C (75.4 °F), and lowest in January, at around 6.7 °C (44.1 °F). The highest temperature ever recorded in Vestric-et-Candiac was 45.4 °C (113.7 °F) on 28 June 2019; the coldest temperature ever recorded was −14.0 °C (6.8 °F) on 15 January 1985.

Climate data for Vestric-et-Candiac (1981−2010 normals, extremes 1966−2020)
Month	Jan	Feb	Mar	Apr	May	Jun	Jul	Aug	Sep	Oct	Nov	Dec	Year
Record high °C (°F)	21.8 (71.2)	25.3 (77.5)	29.0 (84.2)	32.5 (90.5)	36.0 (96.8)	45.4 (113.7)	39.0 (102.2)	41.0 (105.8)	36.2 (97.2)	32.5 (90.5)	26.5 (79.7)	21.0 (69.8)	45.4 (113.7)
Mean daily maximum °C (°F)	11.3 (52.3)	12.6 (54.7)	16.3 (61.3)	18.9 (66.0)	23.2 (73.8)	27.6 (81.7)	30.8 (87.4)	30.4 (86.7)	25.8 (78.4)	20.7 (69.3)	14.9 (58.8)	11.6 (52.9)	20.4 (68.7)
Daily mean °C (°F)	6.7 (44.1)	7.6 (45.7)	10.7 (51.3)	13.3 (55.9)	17.3 (63.1)	21.2 (70.2)	24.1 (75.4)	23.8 (74.8)	19.9 (67.8)	15.8 (60.4)	10.4 (50.7)	7.4 (45.3)	14.9 (58.8)
Mean daily minimum °C (°F)	2.0 (35.6)	2.5 (36.5)	5.1 (41.2)	7.7 (45.9)	11.4 (52.5)	14.8 (58.6)	17.4 (63.3)	17.3 (63.1)	13.9 (57.0)	10.9 (51.6)	5.8 (42.4)	3.2 (37.8)	9.4 (48.9)
Record low °C (°F)	−14.0 (6.8)	−8.5 (16.7)	−6.5 (20.3)	−2.1 (28.2)	0.0 (32.0)	5.8 (42.4)	8.5 (47.3)	8.0 (46.4)	3.5 (38.3)	−1.5 (29.3)	−6.1 (21.0)	−9.0 (15.8)	−14.0 (6.8)
Average precipitation mm (inches)	57.2 (2.25)	46.0 (1.81)	37.3 (1.47)	58.7 (2.31)	46.9 (1.85)	32.0 (1.26)	22.1 (0.87)	44.0 (1.73)	99.4 (3.91)	113.1 (4.45)	79.7 (3.14)	64.1 (2.52)	700.5 (27.58)
Average precipitation days (≥ 1.0 mm)	5.9	4.8	4.9	6.7	5.5	3.9	2.3	3.7	4.8	7.0	6.7	6.1	62.4
Source: Météo-France

== Population ==
Historical population
Year	Pop.	±% p.a.
1968	436	—
1975	503	+2.06%
1982	654	+3.82%
1990	1,001	+5.46%
1999	1,324	+3.16%
2007	1,330	+0.06%
2012	1,377	+0.70%
2017	1,406	+0.42%
2023	1,354	−0.63%
Source: INSEE

== See also ==
- Costières de Nîmes AOC
- Communes of the Gard department
