= Empègue =

Type of graffiti produced in Occitania

- Empeguar
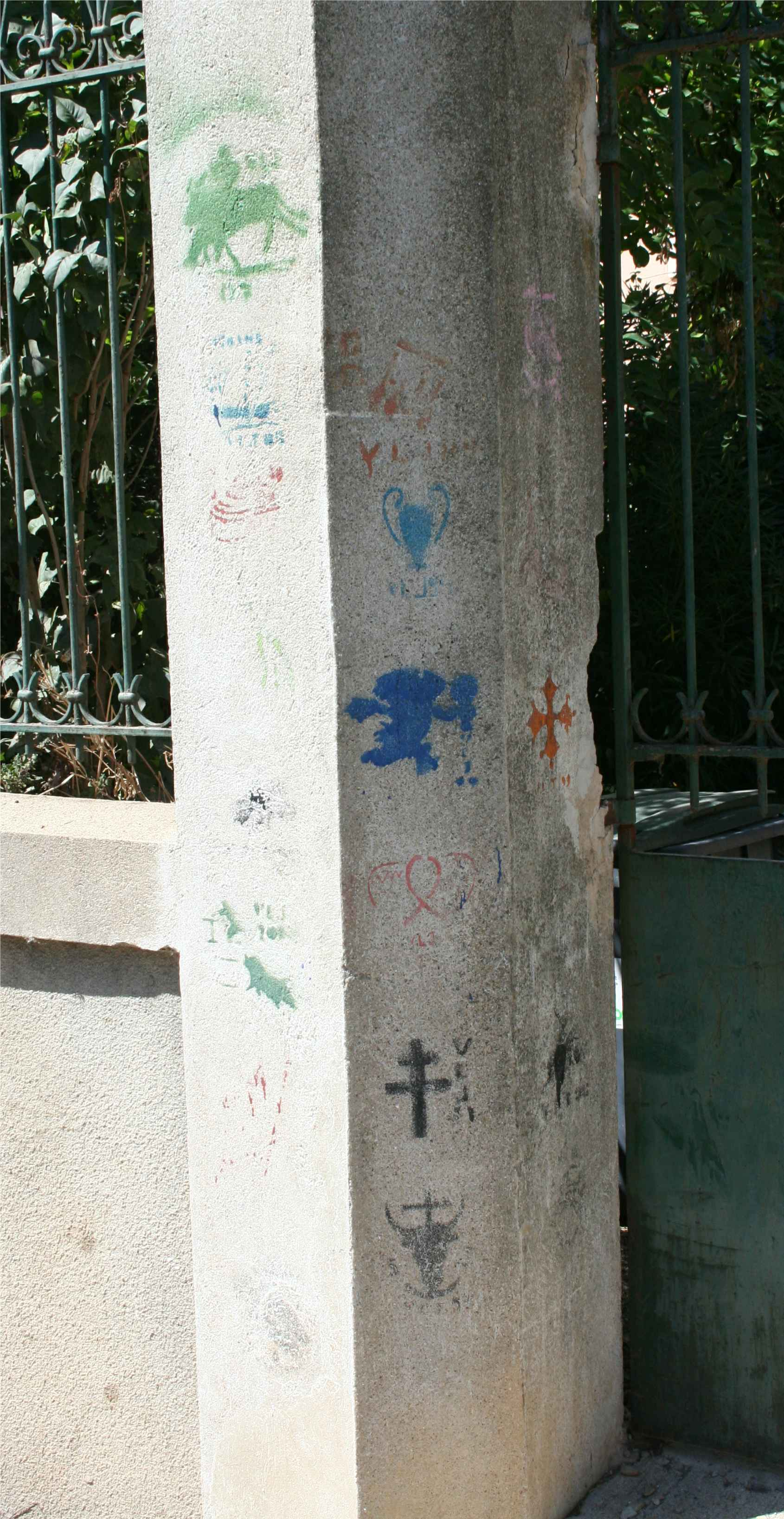
- Empègue around a doorway in Beauvoisin
- Type: Graffiti
- Material: Soot and paste; Spray paint
- Writing: VLJ (Viù Lo Joven)
- Symbols: Manade Horses; Flamingoes; Bulls
- Created: Early 20th century – present
- Present location: Occitania
- Culture: Occitan

Empègues are small images stencilled on doorways in the Occitania region of southern France. The empègue symbolizes that the household has contributed to groups of youths gathering funds for celebrations each August.

The drawings are made by the youths of a village and are said to date from the early part of the twentieth century when the local male youths would be conscripted into the military. Conscription is no longer practiced in France, but the tradition continues. The images are of traditional subjects which symbolize the local area. In the Petite Camargue the images frequently involve horses, flamingoes and, of, course, bulls because of the local version of bullfighting (Course camarguaise). In the version of bullfighting licensed in France, the bull is merely decorated with prizes which youths attempt to steal from the long-horned bull. The bull gets to fight another day.

== Etymology ==
The word is said to have derived from a word in Occitan, empeguar, which means "stick". In Spanish the meaning is to mark with pitch. Another suggestion is that it comes from Pegare - the word for paste. The original Empègues were made from a mixture of soot and paste.

== Detail ==
The images frequently include the abbreviation V.L.J. which stands for Vive La Jeunesse and the year of creation. In this way, it is possible to date the development of the designs over many years. The samples included here date back over 40 years to 1964 (when conscription was still practiced). Many of these images are from the village of Beauvoisin, but they could have come from any of the villages in Southern France where many of the smallest villages will have their own arena for bullfighting.

Groups are formed which fundraise for the season of celebrations of youth called the aubade in August. Groups will form to support their teams, to gather funds and to place their empègues around their area and at their base.

The purpose of the images is to record which houses have contributed to the funds for the festival. This is why the images vary from year to year and why the design is important. The Empègue is the brand of the group that collected money from you.

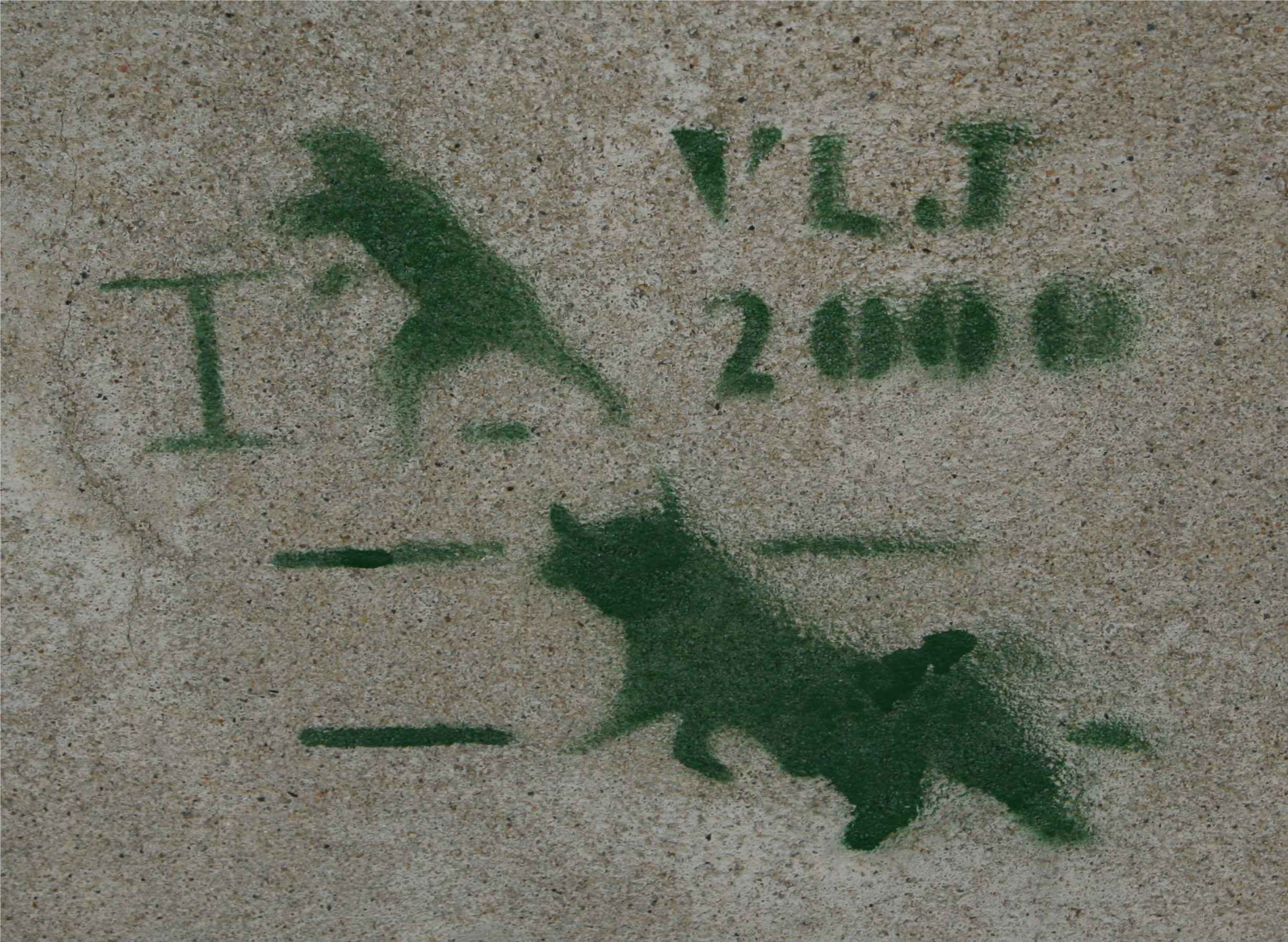
Beauvoisin ""VLJ 2000"" This millennium image shows the bull and the runner who is trying to capture prizes from the bulls horns.

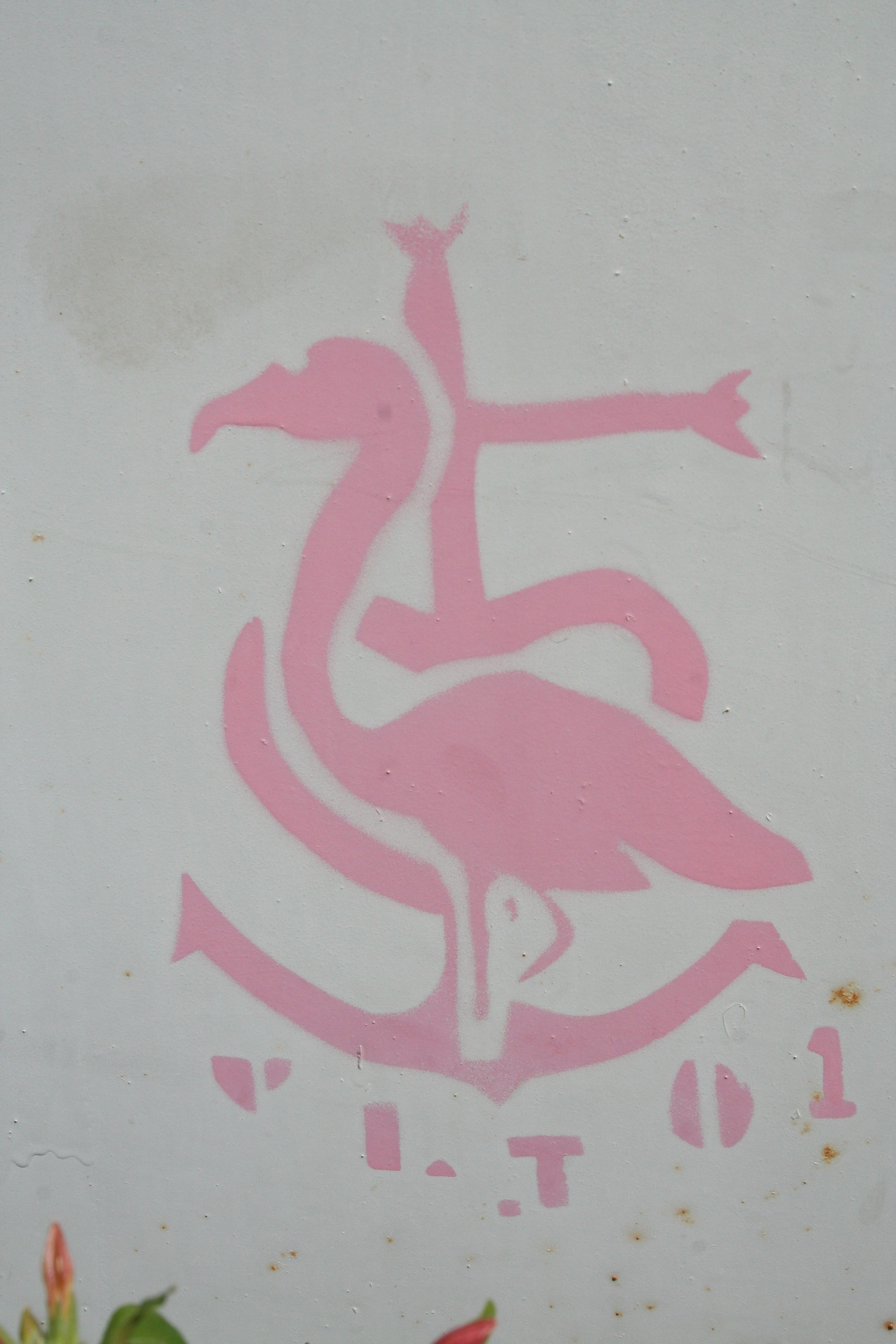
""VLJ 2001"" The flamingos are wild in southern France.

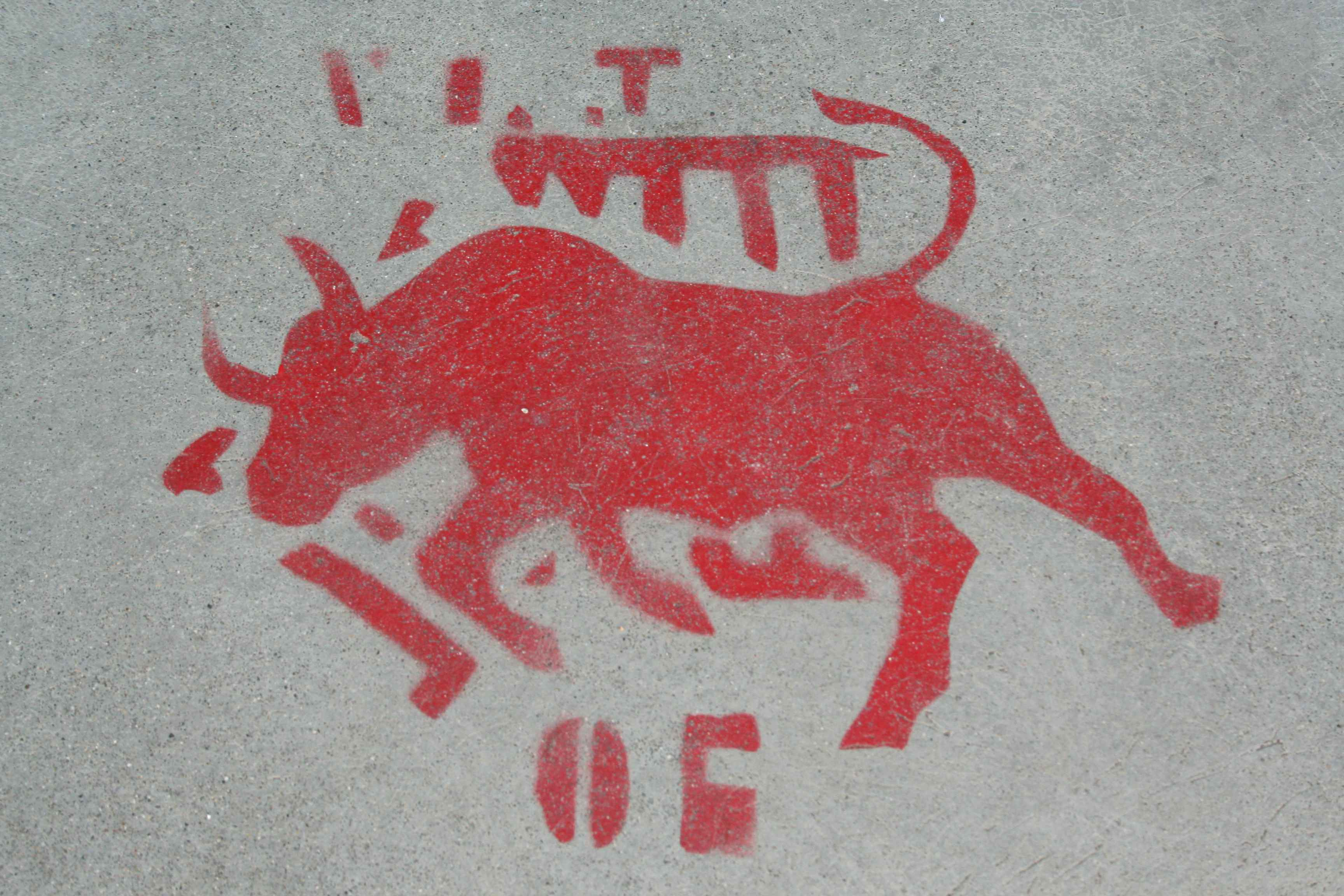
""VLJ 2006"" A charging bull from 2006.

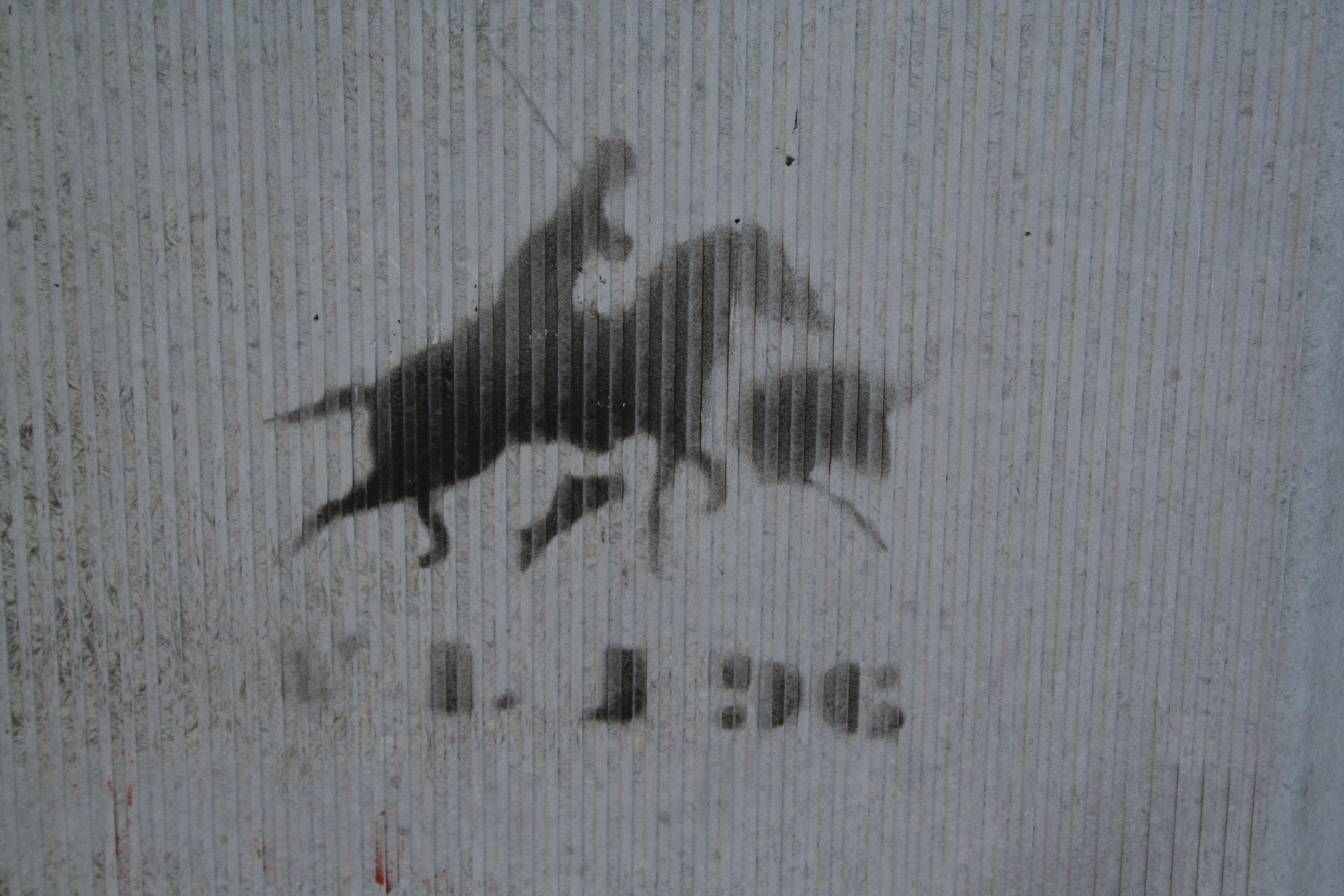
Beauvoisin ""VLJ 1996""

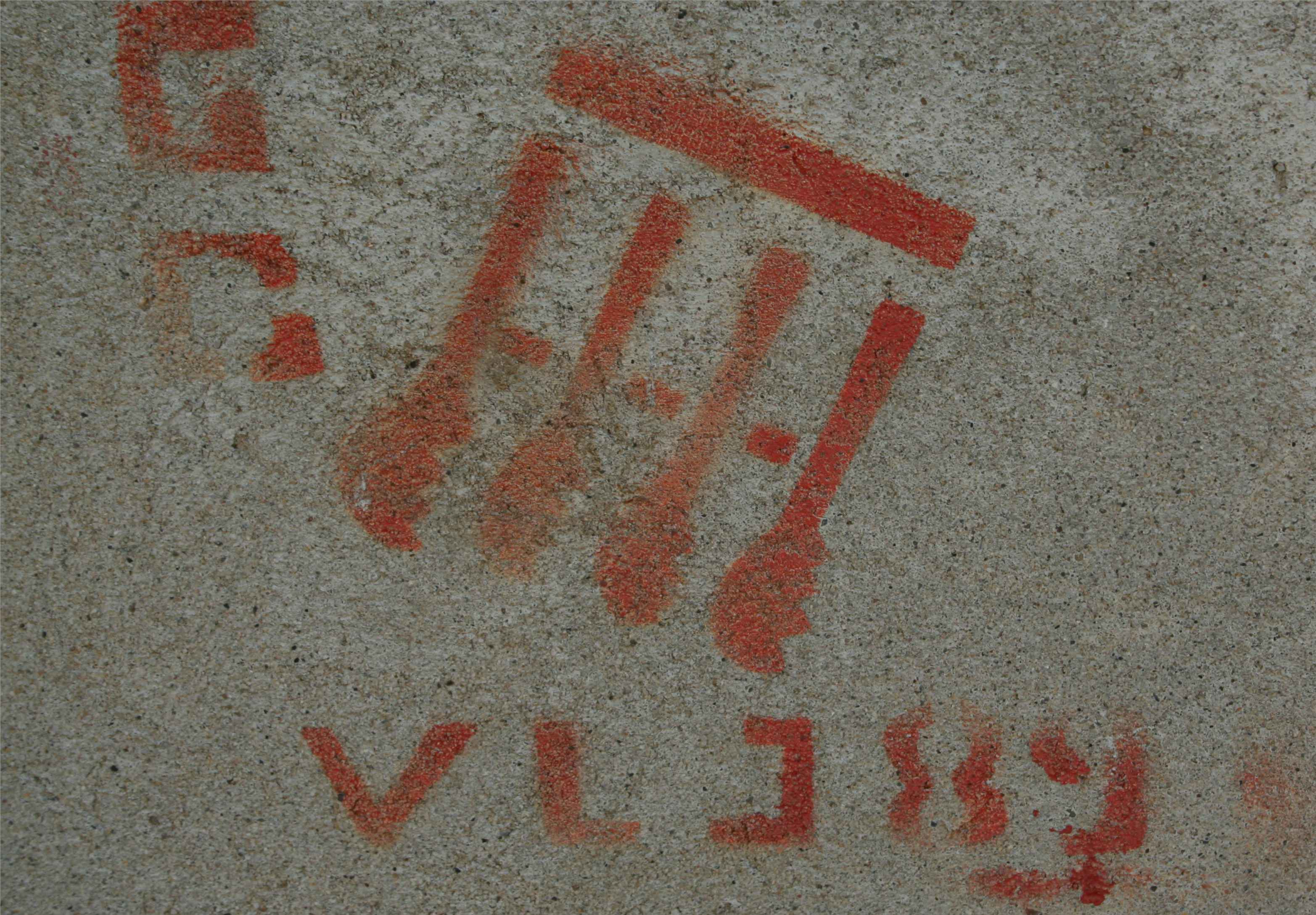
Beauvoisin ""VLJ 1989""

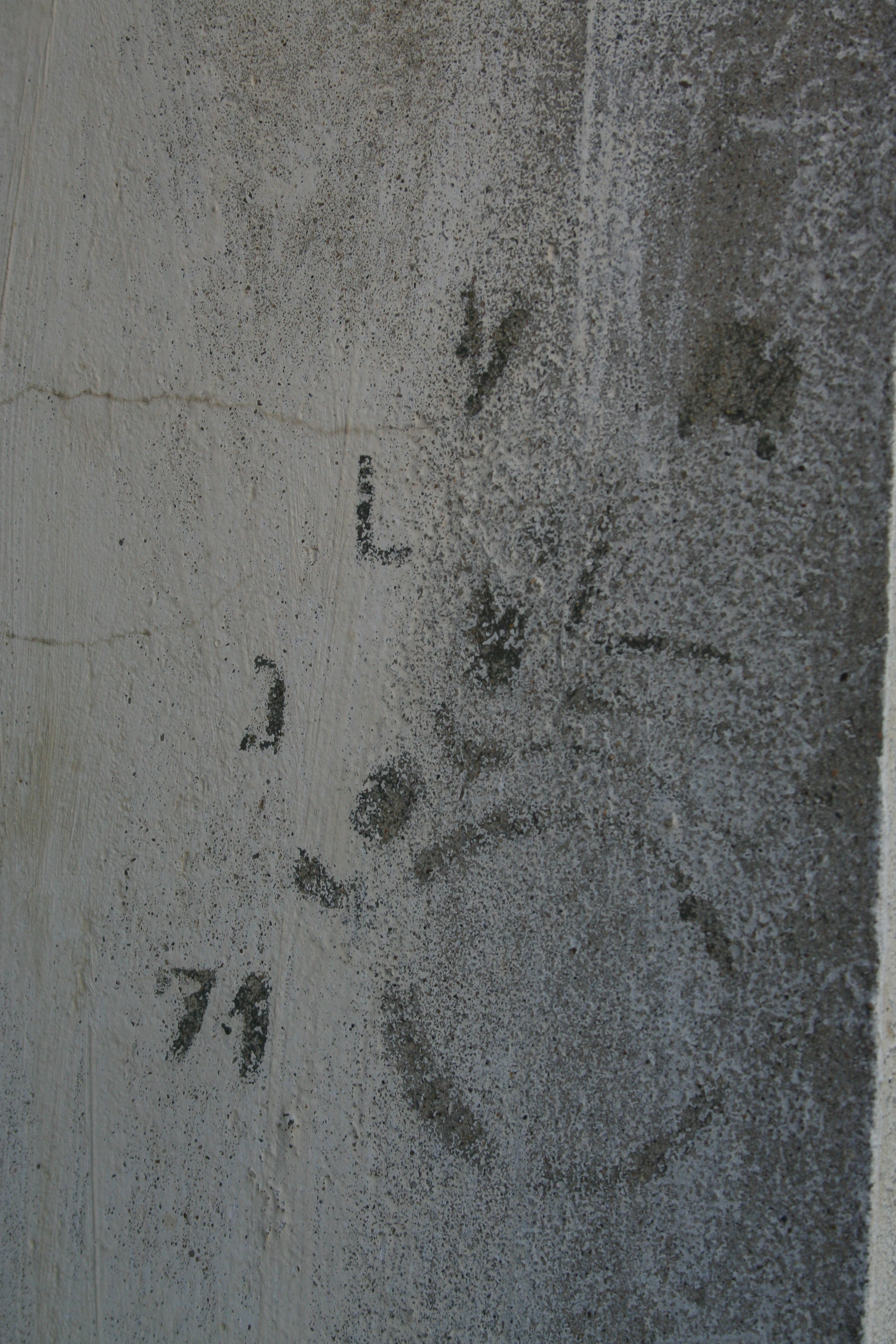
Beauvoisin ""VLJ 1971""

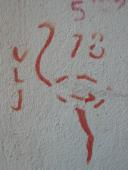
""VLJ 1978"" 1978 was another flamingo

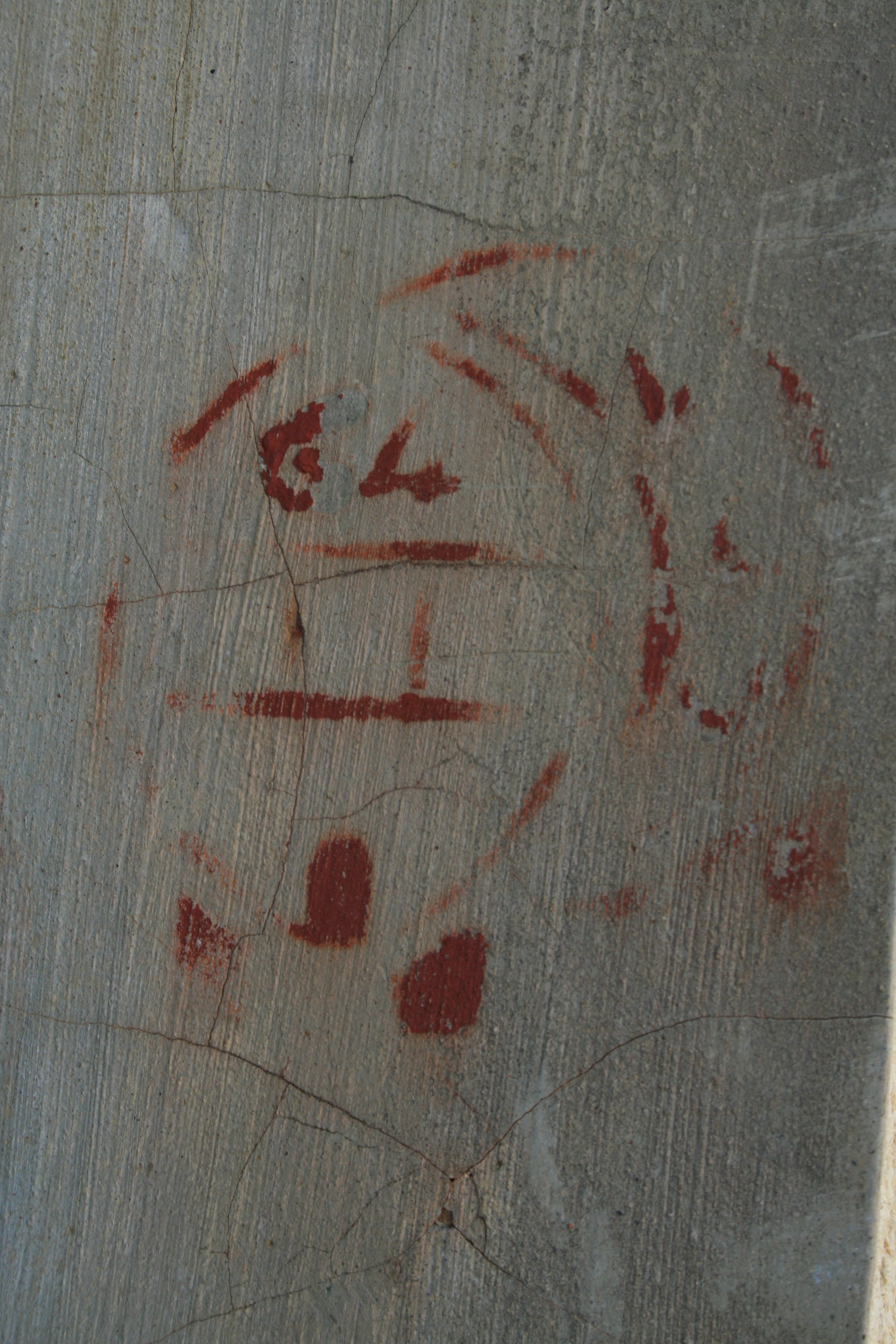
Beauvoisin ""VLJ 1964""

== See also ==
- Fête votive
