= Le Cailar =

Commune in Occitanie, France

- Commune
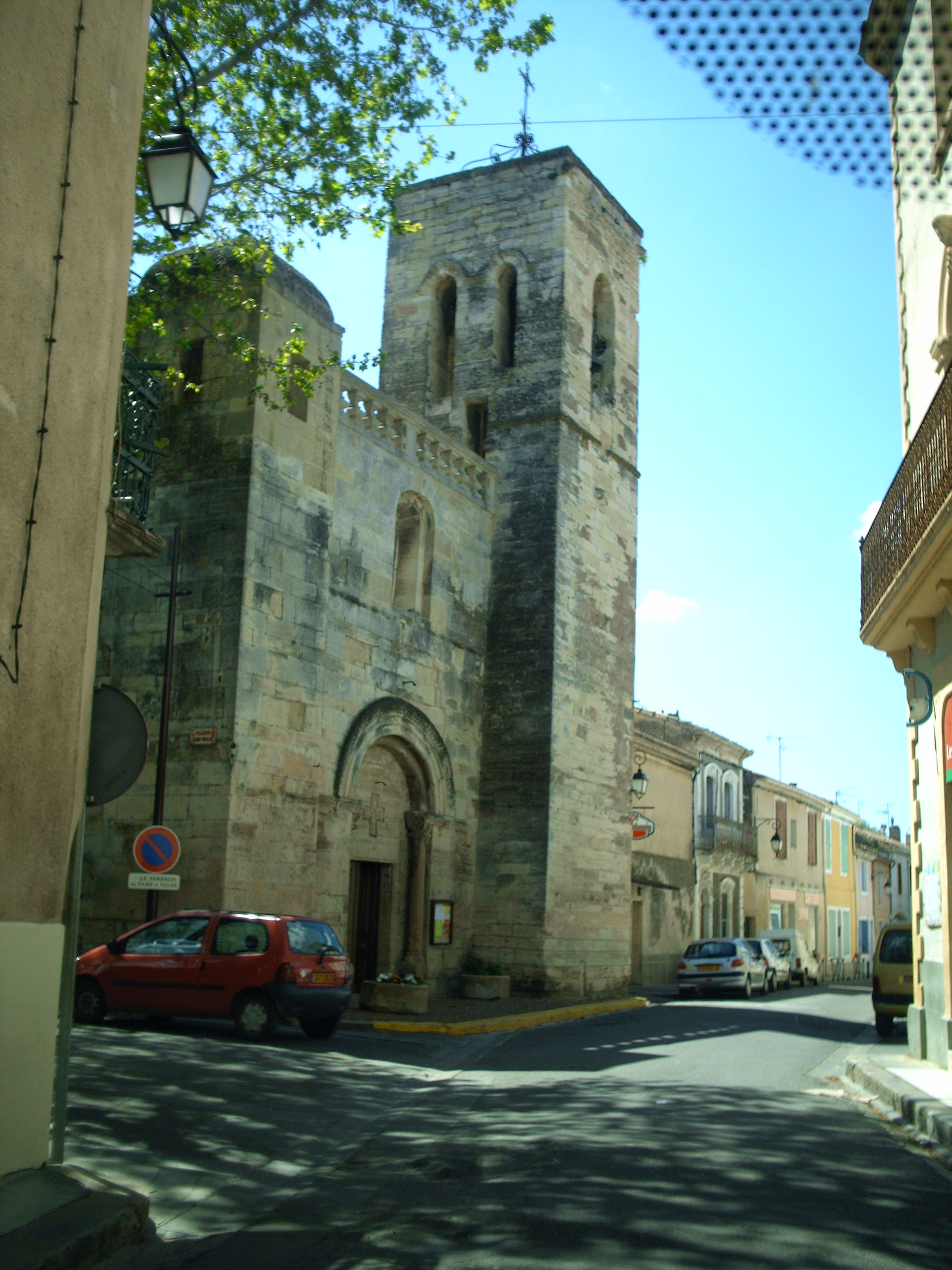
- Sainte-Étienne Church, Le Cailar

- Coat of arms
- Location of Le Cailar
- Location within France Location within Occitanie
- Coordinates: 43°40′37″N 4°14′12″E
- Country: France
- Region: Occitania
- Department: Gard
- Arrondissement: Nîmes
- Canton: Aigues-Mortes
- Intercommunality: CC Petite-Camargue

Government
  - Mayor (2020–2026): Joël Tena
- Area^{1}: 30.01 km^{2} (11.59 sq mi)
- Elevation: 7 m (23 ft)
- Highest elevation: 41 m (135 ft)
- Lowest elevation: 0 m (0 ft)
- Population (2023): 2,578
  - Density: 85.90/km^{2} (222.5/sq mi)
- Time zone: UTC+01:00 (CET)
  - Summer (DST): UTC+02:00 (CEST)
- INSEE/Postal code: 30059 /30740
- ^{1} French Land Register data, which excludes lakes, ponds, glaciers > 1 km^{2} (0.386 sq mi or 247 acres) and river estuaries.

Le Cailar (French pronunciation: [lə kɛlaʁ]; Occitan: Lo Cailar) is a commune in the Gard department in southern France. It is located at the confluence of the River Vistre and the River Rhôny. It was an important port during the Iron Age at a time when lagoons connected to the Mediterranean Sea covered the adjoining low-lying land.

== History ==
The town has a rich archaeological history, and seems to have been inhabited since at least the late 6th century BC. There have been significant finds of pottery dating back to the 4th century BC, mostly unearthed in the churchyard. A cache of 3rd-century-BC weapons has been found which included swords, shields, spears and knives, along with about thirty human skulls which showed signs that the bodies had been decapitated. Inscribed stones from the Roman era have also been found at this location and traces of stone walls that surrounded the settlement.

Le Cailar is first documented as Castellus in 675. The name later evolved to Caslarium (1243) and Le Caylar (from the 15th century). In the Middle Ages, the village belonged to the viguerie of Aigues-Mortes and the Diocese of Nîmes. The simple priory of Saint-Étienne-du-Caylar came under the chapter of Montpellier Cathedral while in 1112 Le Cailar Castle (Château du Cailar) belonged to Bernard Ato IV, Viscount of Nîmes. Saint-Étienne du Cailar Church was built in 1091. Initially, the prosperity of the region was a result of the trade that developed in fish and salt. The monks of Saint Gilles appear to have founded the village. In 1382, the medieval castle was burnt to destruction in the feudal wars. The fiefdom was transferred to the barons of Baschy d'Aubais in the 16th century. By the time of the French Revolution, there were only a few traces of the medieval castle which nevertheless is remembered as an important item in the history of the village.

== Geography ==
Le Cailar is located at the confluence of the Rivers Vistre and Rhôny, about 26 km (16 mi) southwest of Nîmes on the edge of the Languedoc coastal plain. This area used to be a large lagoon which has gradually silted up over time. Le Cailar was an important trading centre allowing import of goods via the Mediterranean Sea and their distribution to the Nîmes Vaunage area. The town was still considered to be a port until the early 20th century as the Vistre remained navigable this far upstream. Le Cailar station has rail connections to Nîmes and Le Grau-du-Roi.

== The village today ==
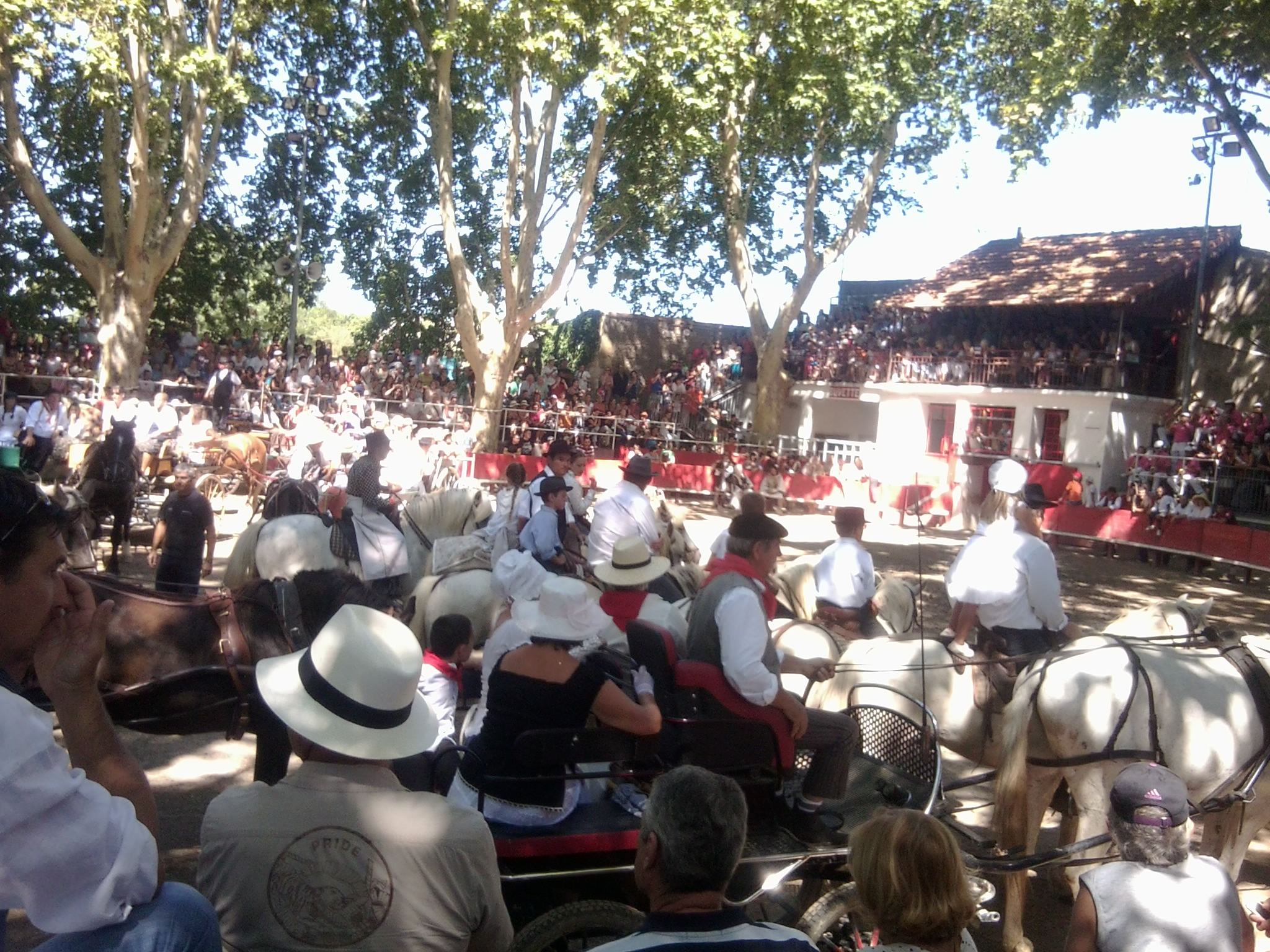
Les Arènes du Cailar

With its winding streets and its bullring (Arènes du Cailar), Le Cailar is a typical Camargue village. It is noted for being the first village in the area (in 1851) to be associated with bull manades. The village is also receptive to modern art with Figuration Libre exhibitions encouraged by painters including François Boisrond. Landmarks include the Arènes du Cailar (the bullring) completed in 1925 and listed as a historic monument in 1993, and the village church, Église Sainte-Étienne, with its 12th-century façade, listed in 1951.

== Population ==
Historical population
Year	Pop.	±% p.a.
1968	1,158	—
1975	1,222	+0.77%
1982	1,412	+2.09%
1990	1,929	+3.98%
1999	2,311	+2.03%
2007	2,381	+0.37%
2012	2,351	−0.25%
2017	2,412	+0.51%
2023	2,578	+1.12%
Source: INSEE

== See also ==
- Communes of the Gard department
- Costières de Nîmes AOC

== Bibliography ==
- Colloque, Association francaise pour l'étude de l'âge du fer. (2007). L'âge du fer dans l'arc jurassien et ses marges: dépôts, lieux sacrés et territorialité à l'âge du fer : actes du XXIXe colloque international de l'AFEAF, Bienne, canton de Berne, Suisse, 5-8 mai 2005 (in French). Presses Univ. Franche-Comté. pp. 657–. ISBN 978-2-84867-201-4.
- Pasquier, Léon (1993). Le Cailar, le Vistre et le Rhony à travers l'histoire (in French). Lacour.
