= Mus, Gard =

Mus
- Commune
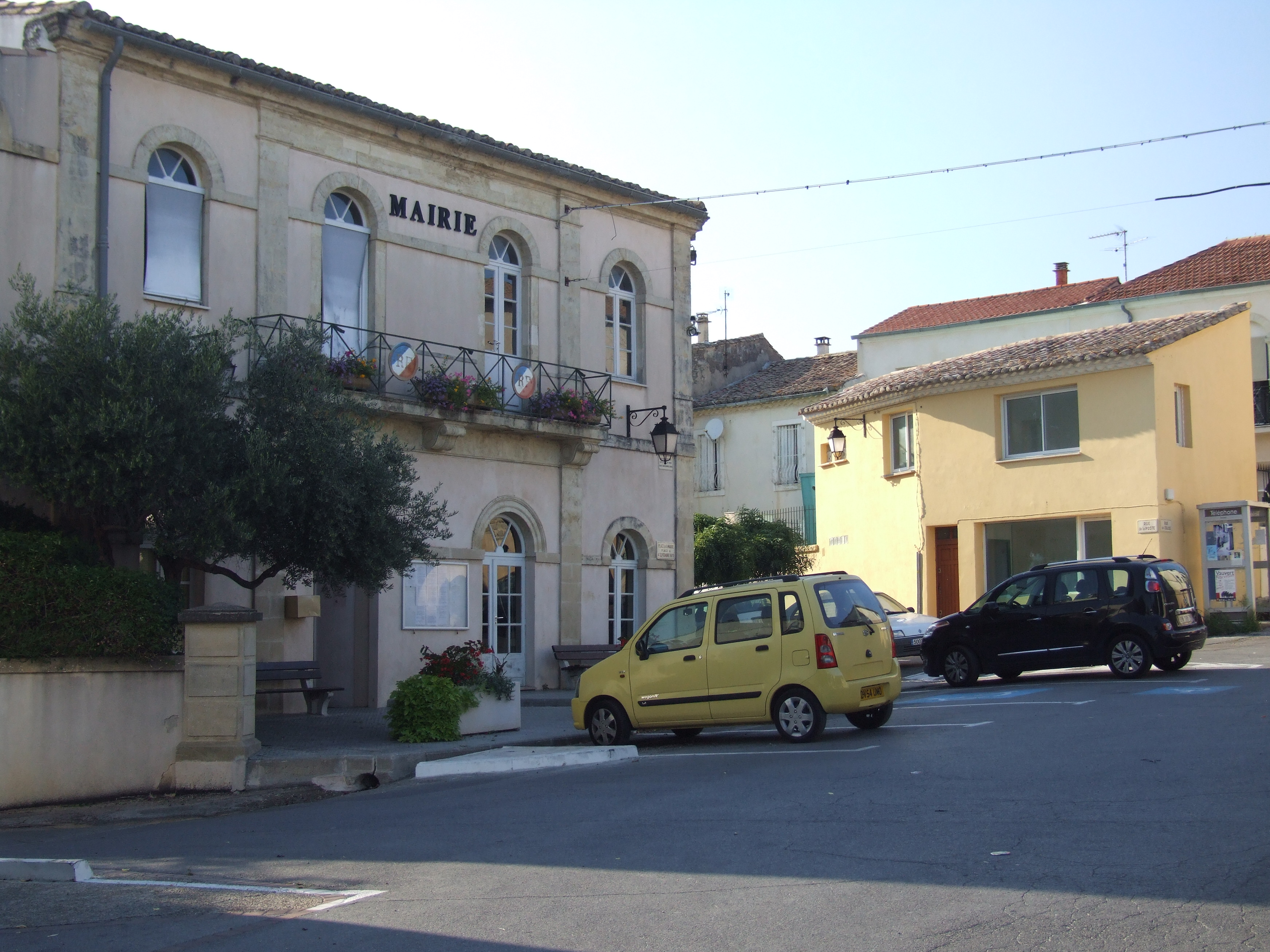
- Town hall
- Location of Mus
- Location within France Location within Occitanie
- Coordinates: 43°44′27″N 4°12′05″E
- Country: France
- Region: Occitania
- Department: Gard
- Arrondissement: Nîmes
- Canton: Vauvert
- Intercommunality: Rhôny Vistre Vidourle

Government
  - Mayor (2020–2026): Patrick Benezech
- Area^{1}: 2.6 km^{2} (1.0 sq mi)
- Elevation: 75 m (246 ft)
- Highest elevation: 68 m (223 ft)
- Lowest elevation: 17 m (56 ft)
- Population (2023): 1,646
  - Density: 630/km^{2} (1,600/sq mi)
- Time zone: UTC+01:00 (CET)
  - Summer (DST): UTC+02:00 (CEST)
- INSEE/Postal code: 30185 /30121
- ^{1} French Land Register data, which excludes lakes, ponds, glaciers > 1 km^{2} (0.386 sq mi or 247 acres) and river estuaries.

Mus (French pronunciation: [mys]; Occitan: Murs) is a commune in the Gard department in southern France.

== Population ==
Historical population
Year	Pop.	±% p.a.
1968	382	—
1975	406	+0.87%
1982	565	+4.83%
1990	768	+3.91%
1999	1,049	+3.53%
2007	1,182	+1.50%
2012	1,326	+2.33%
2017	1,410	+1.24%
2023	1,646	+2.61%
Source: INSEE

== See also ==
- Communes of the Gard department
