= Aubord =

Commune in Occitanie, France

- Commune
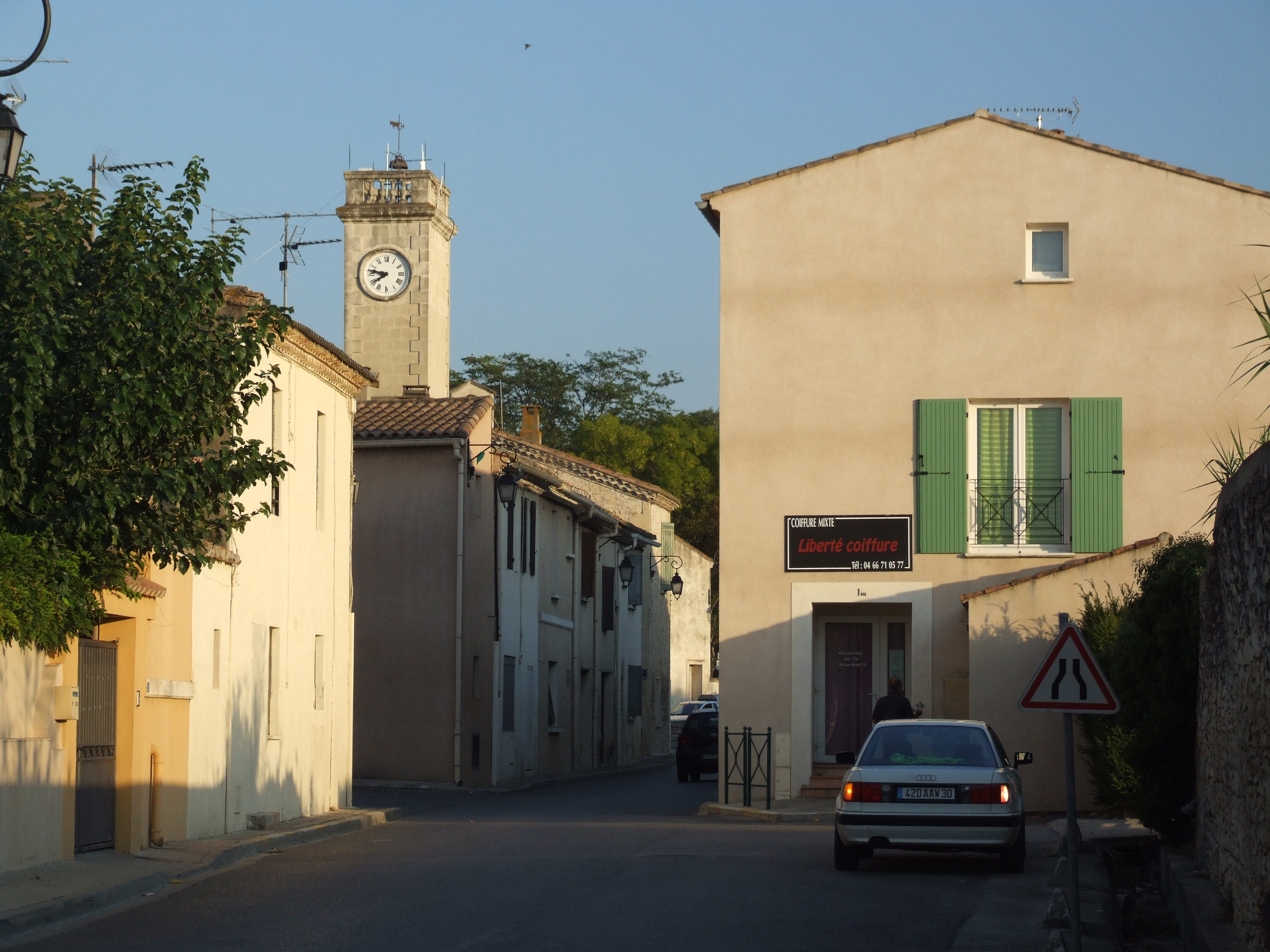
- A view of Aubord

- Coat of arms
- Location of Aubord
- Location within France Location within Occitanie
- Coordinates: 43°45′28″N 4°18′47″E
- Country: France
- Region: Occitania
- Department: Gard
- Arrondissement: Nîmes
- Canton: Vauvert
- Intercommunality: CC Petite Camargue

Government
  - Mayor (2020–2026): André Brundu
- Area^{1}: 9.42 km^{2} (3.64 sq mi)
- Elevation: 14 m (46 ft)
- Highest elevation: 64 m (210 ft)
- Lowest elevation: 17 m (56 ft)
- Population (2023): 2,253
  - Density: 239/km^{2} (619/sq mi)
- Time zone: UTC+01:00 (CET)
  - Summer (DST): UTC+02:00 (CEST)
- INSEE/Postal code: 30020 /30620
- ^{1} French Land Register data, which excludes lakes, ponds, glaciers > 1 km^{2} (0.386 sq mi or 247 acres) and river estuaries.

Aubord (French pronunciation: [obɔʁ]; Occitan: Aubòrn) is a commune in the Gard department in southern France. Aubord is situated 15 km (9.3 mi) southwest of Nîmes.

== Population ==
Historical population
Year	Pop.	±% p.a.
1968	292	—
1975	483	+7.45%
1982	791	+7.30%
1990	1,607	+9.26%
1999	1,910	+1.94%
2007	2,360	+2.68%
2012	2,401	+0.35%
2017	2,375	−0.22%
2023	2,253	−0.88%
Source: INSEE

== Personalities ==
The Franco-German geographer Christophe Neff has lived several years in Aubord. During this time he considered Aubord as his Home harbor in France. In his blog he compared Aubord to the fictional village Macondo.

== See also ==
- Costières de Nîmes AOC
- Communes of the Gard department
