= Beauvoisin, Gard =

Commune in Occitanie, France

Beauvoisin
- Commune
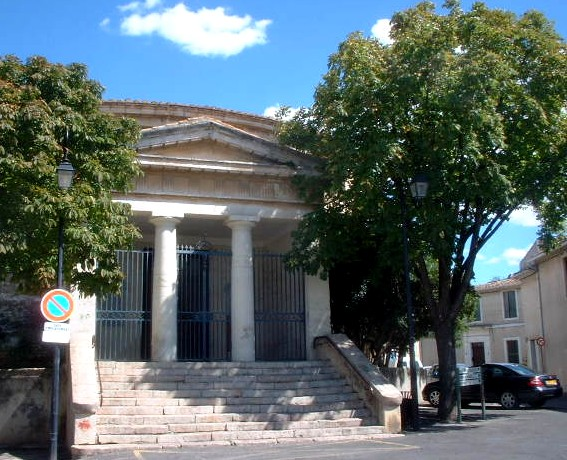
- The temple in Beauvoisin

- Coat of arms
- Location of Beauvoisin
- Location within France Location within Occitanie
- Coordinates: 43°43′09″N 4°19′26″E
- Country: France
- Region: Occitania
- Department: Gard
- Arrondissement: Nîmes
- Canton: Vauvert
- Intercommunality: CC Petite-Camargue

Government
  - Mayor (2020–2026): Mylène Cayzac
- Area^{1}: 27.82 km^{2} (10.74 sq mi)
- Elevation: 69 m (226 ft)
- Highest elevation: 128 m (420 ft)
- Lowest elevation: 1 m (3.3 ft)
- Population (2023): 6,066
  - Density: 218.0/km^{2} (564.7/sq mi)
- Time zone: UTC+01:00 (CET)
  - Summer (DST): UTC+02:00 (CEST)
- INSEE/Postal code: 30033 /30640
- ^{1} French Land Register data, which excludes lakes, ponds, glaciers > 1 km^{2} (0.386 sq mi or 247 acres) and river estuaries.

Beauvoisin (French pronunciation: [bovwazɛ̃]; Occitan: Bèuvesin) is a commune in the Gard department in southern France. Beauvoisin station has rail connections to Nîmes and Le Grau-du-Roi.

Beauvoisin is a small southern village with a post office, bar, newsagent, grocers, butchers and a couple of bakeries. It retains a tradition of bull running in the city streets and the arenas. This involves retrieving decorations that are attached to the bull's horns. The idea is to demonstrate bravery rather than to kill or gain a victory over a bull. Another local tradition is the Empègue which appears annually in designs that reflect the local culture.

== Historic buildings ==
The castle was an early building being constructed in 1067 for the Knights Templar.

The Protestant temple was built in 1819 by the architect Charled Durand. A bell tower was added in 1835. In 2012, it was officially declared a historical monument.

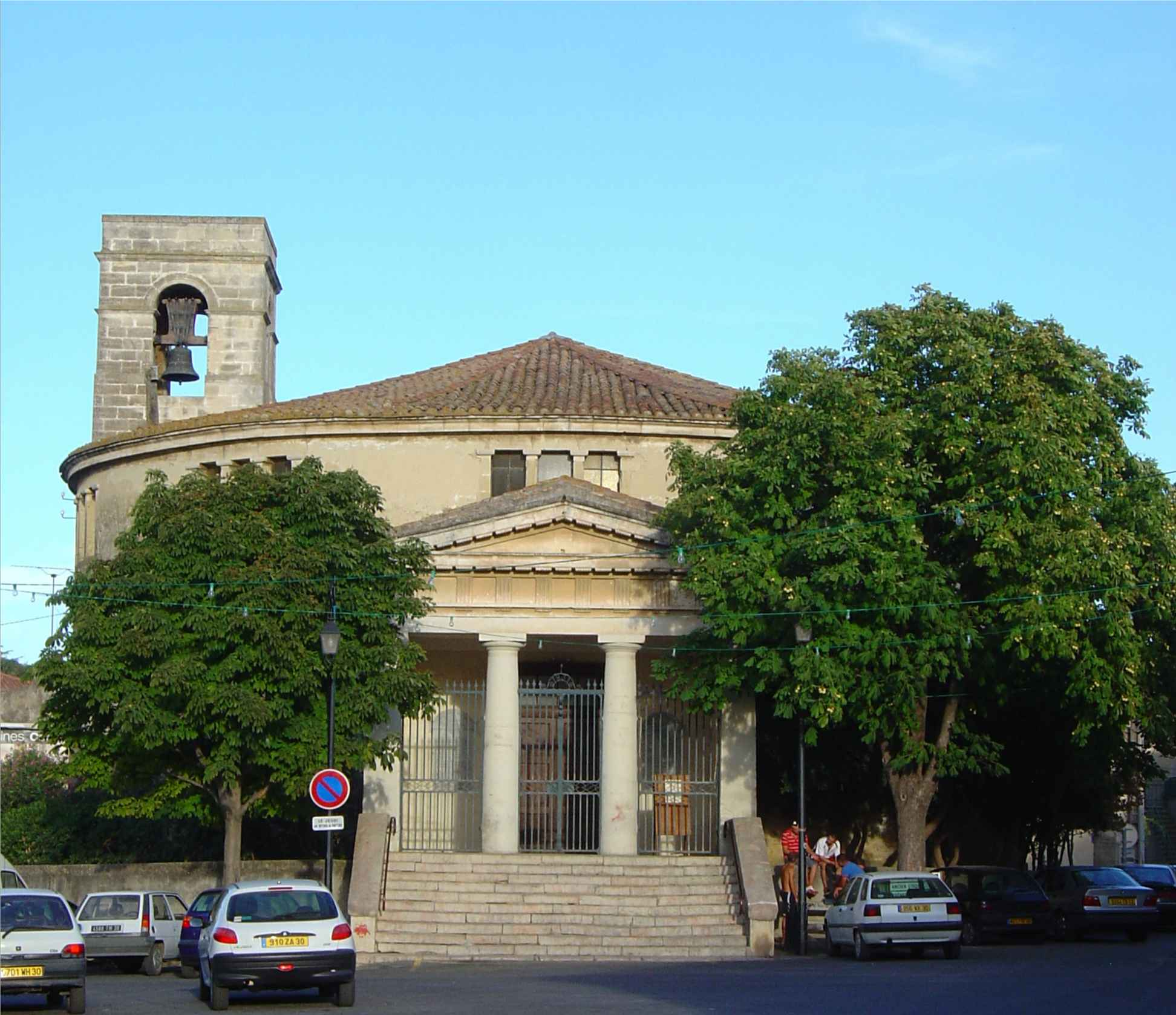
Protestant temple of Beauvoisin in 2006

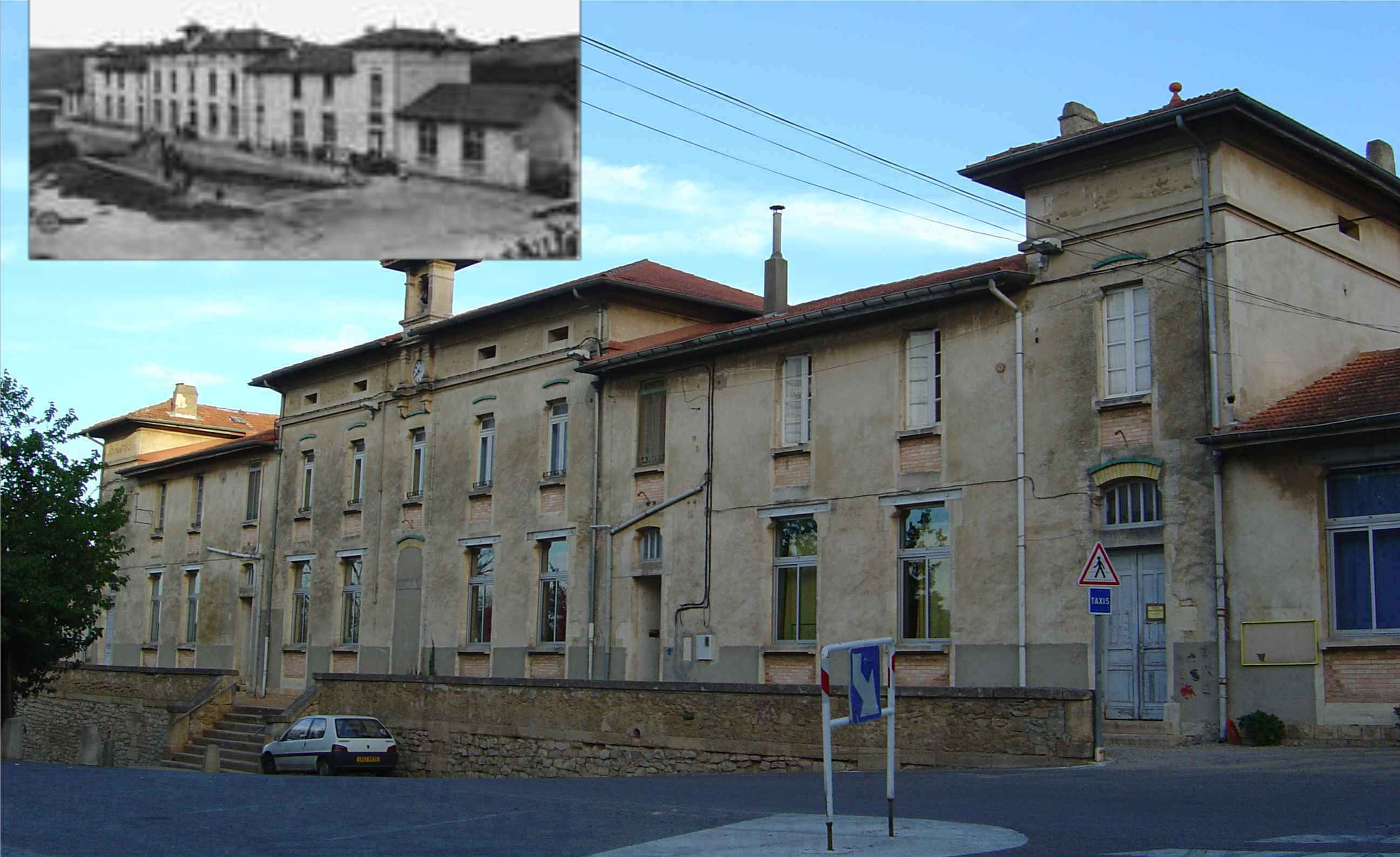
The primary school

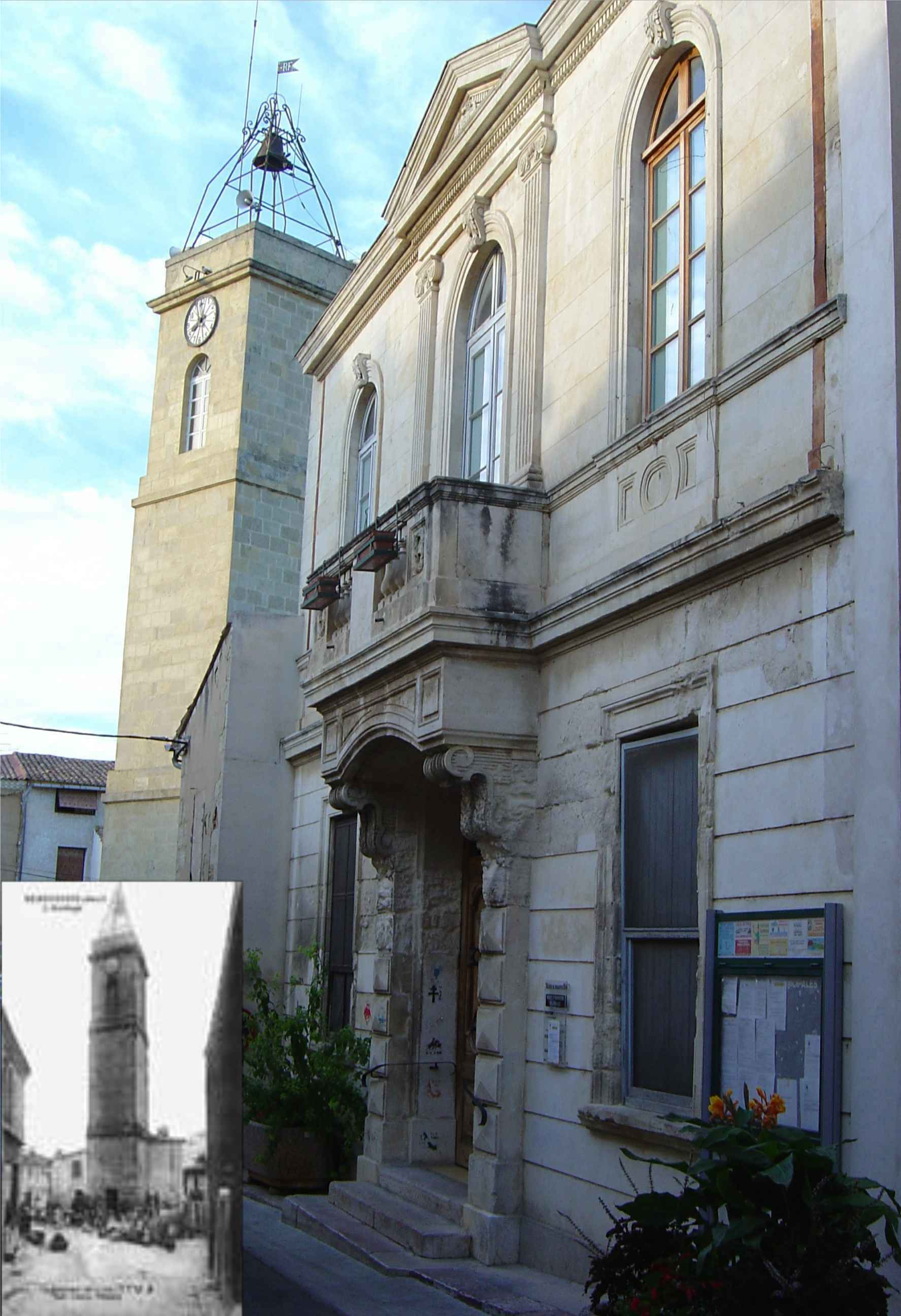
The Town Hall and Clock

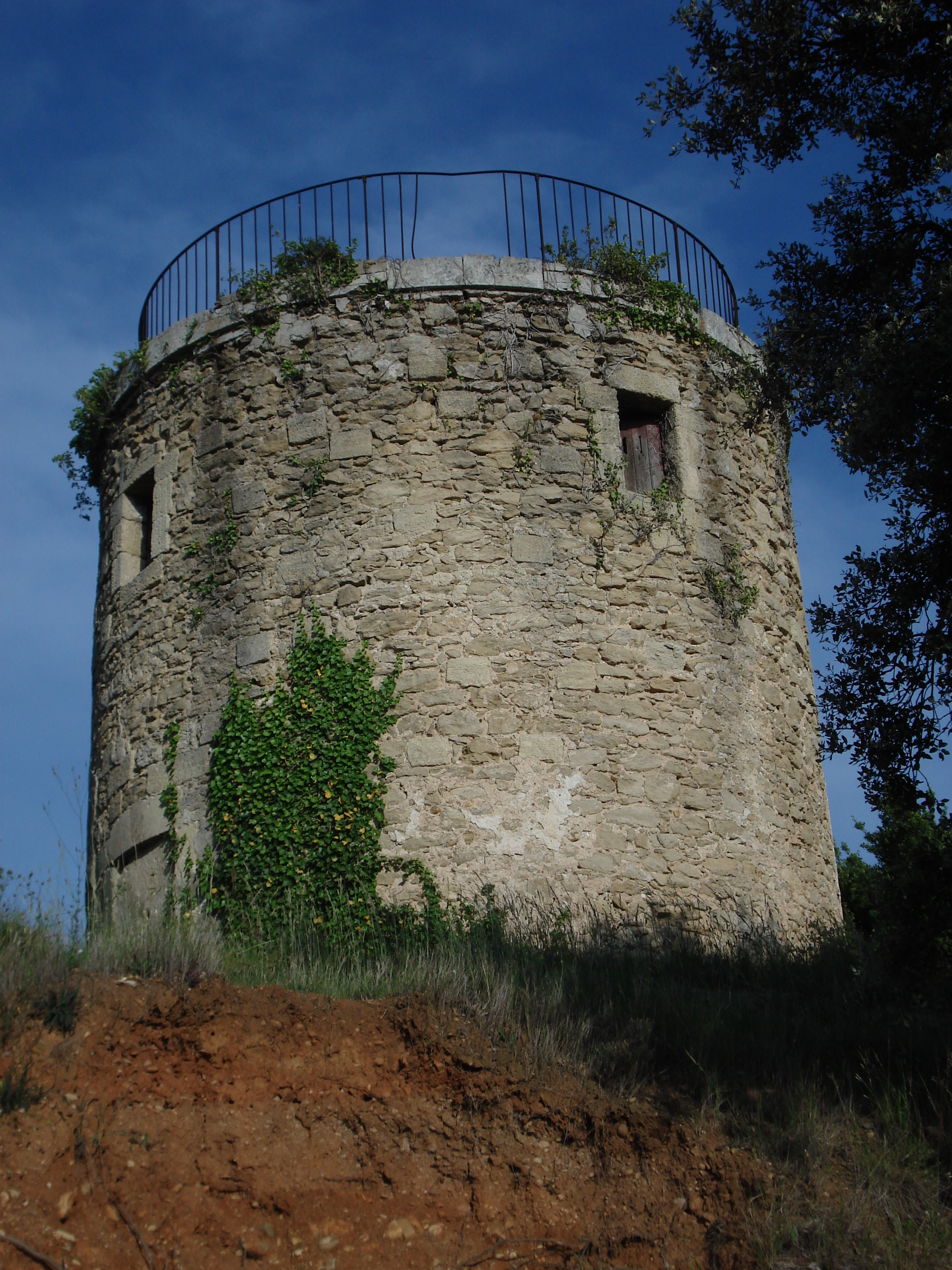
One of the two remains of windmills

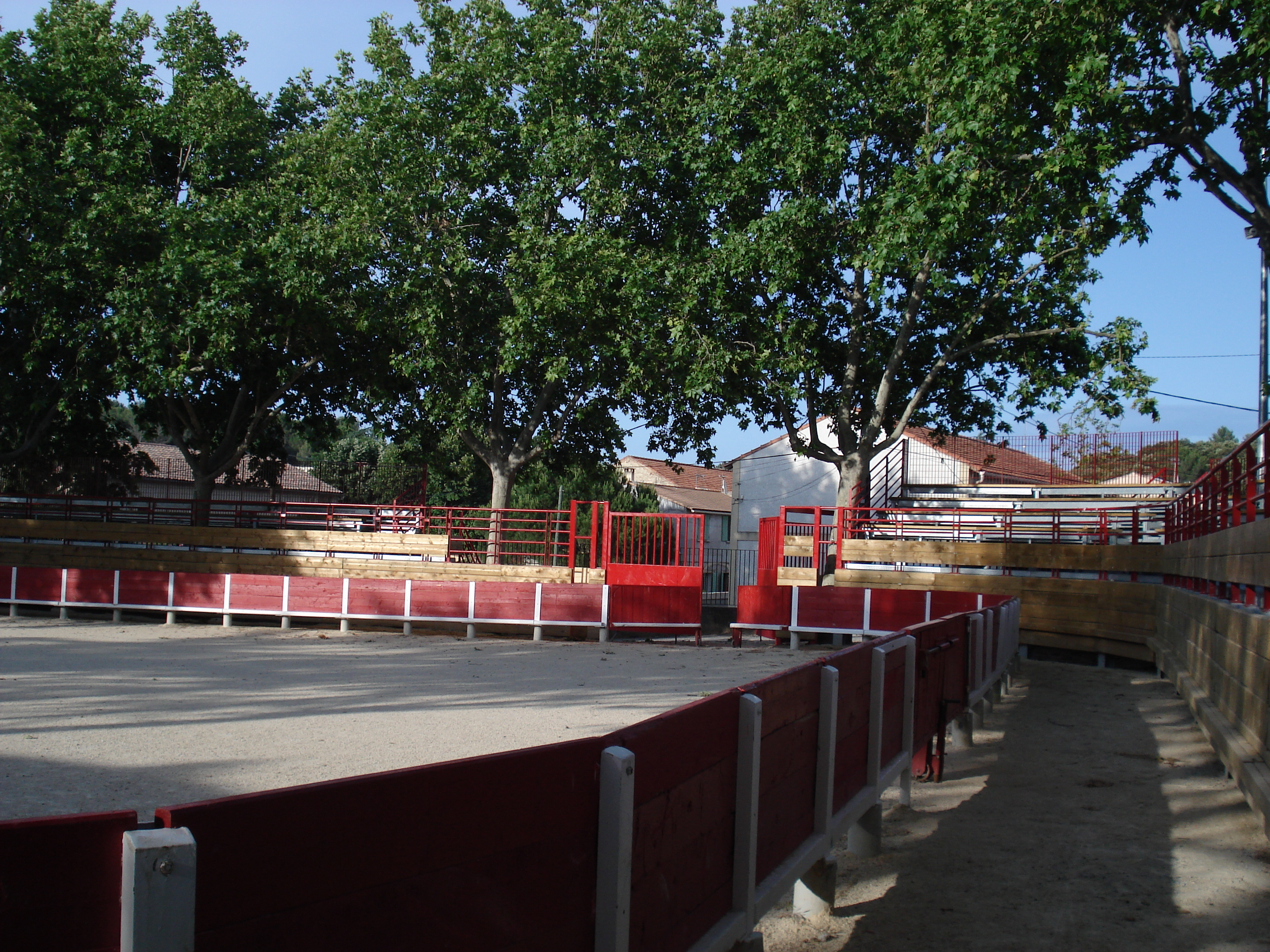
The bull arena after renovation in 2007

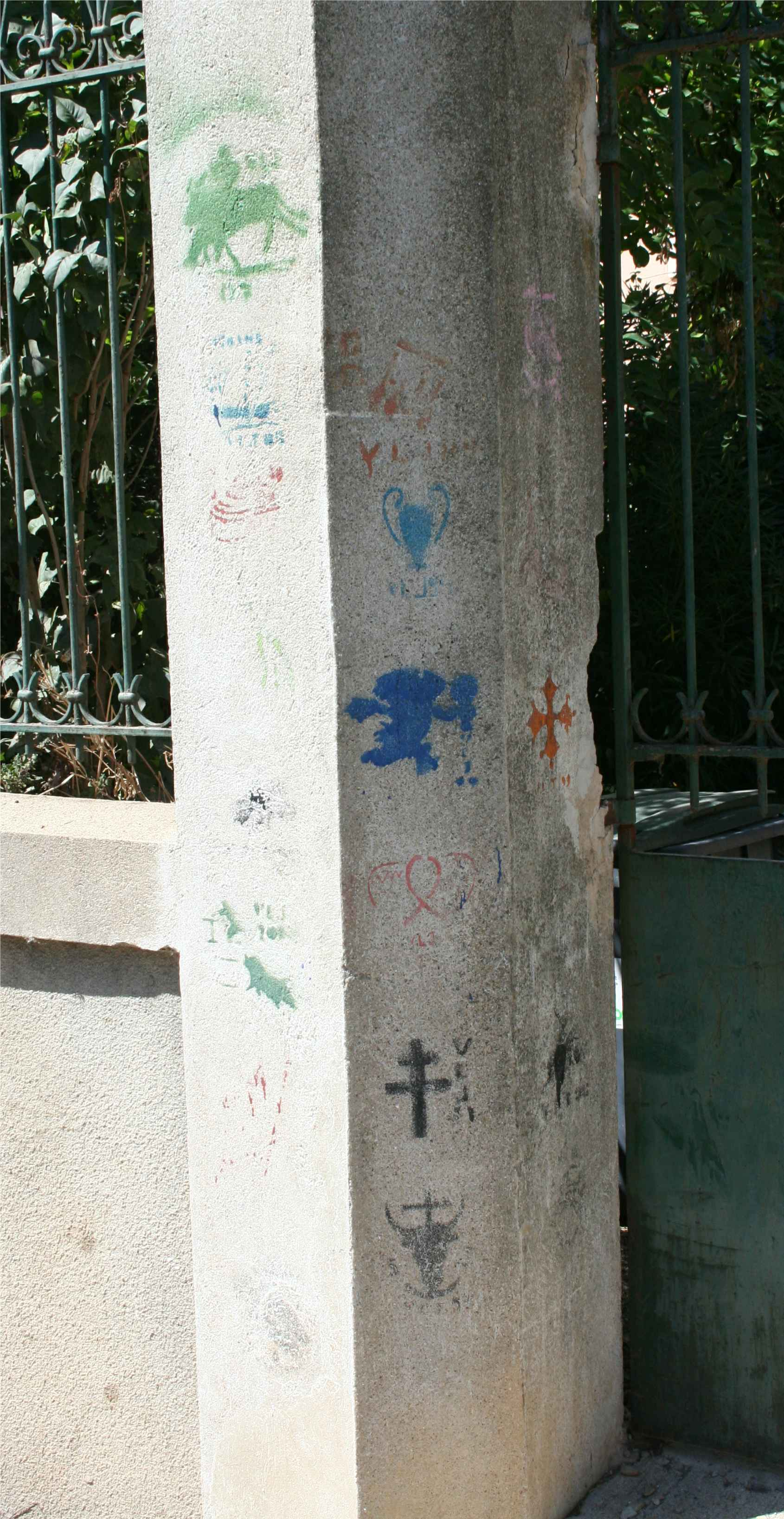
Empègues - not on a historic building!

== Population ==
Historical population

Year	Pop.	±% p.a.
1851	1,315	—
1901	1,651	+0.46%
1906	1,759	+1.28%
1911	1,775	+0.18%
1921	1,716	−0.34%
1926	1,608	−1.29%
1931	1,720	+1.36%
1936	1,620	−1.19%
1946	1,404	−1.42%
1954	1,553	+1.27%

Year	Pop.	±% p.a.
1962	1,553	+0.00%
1968	1,580	+0.29%
1975	1,502	−0.72%
1982	1,901	+3.42%
1990	2,706	+4.51%
1999	3,133	+1.64%
2007	3,335	+0.78%
2012	4,063	+4.03%
2017	4,780	+3.30%
2023	6,066	+4.05%

Source: EHESS and INSEE (1968-2023)

== See also ==
- Costières de Nîmes AOC
- Communes of the Gard department
