= Uchaud =

Uchaud Uchau (Occitan)
- Commune
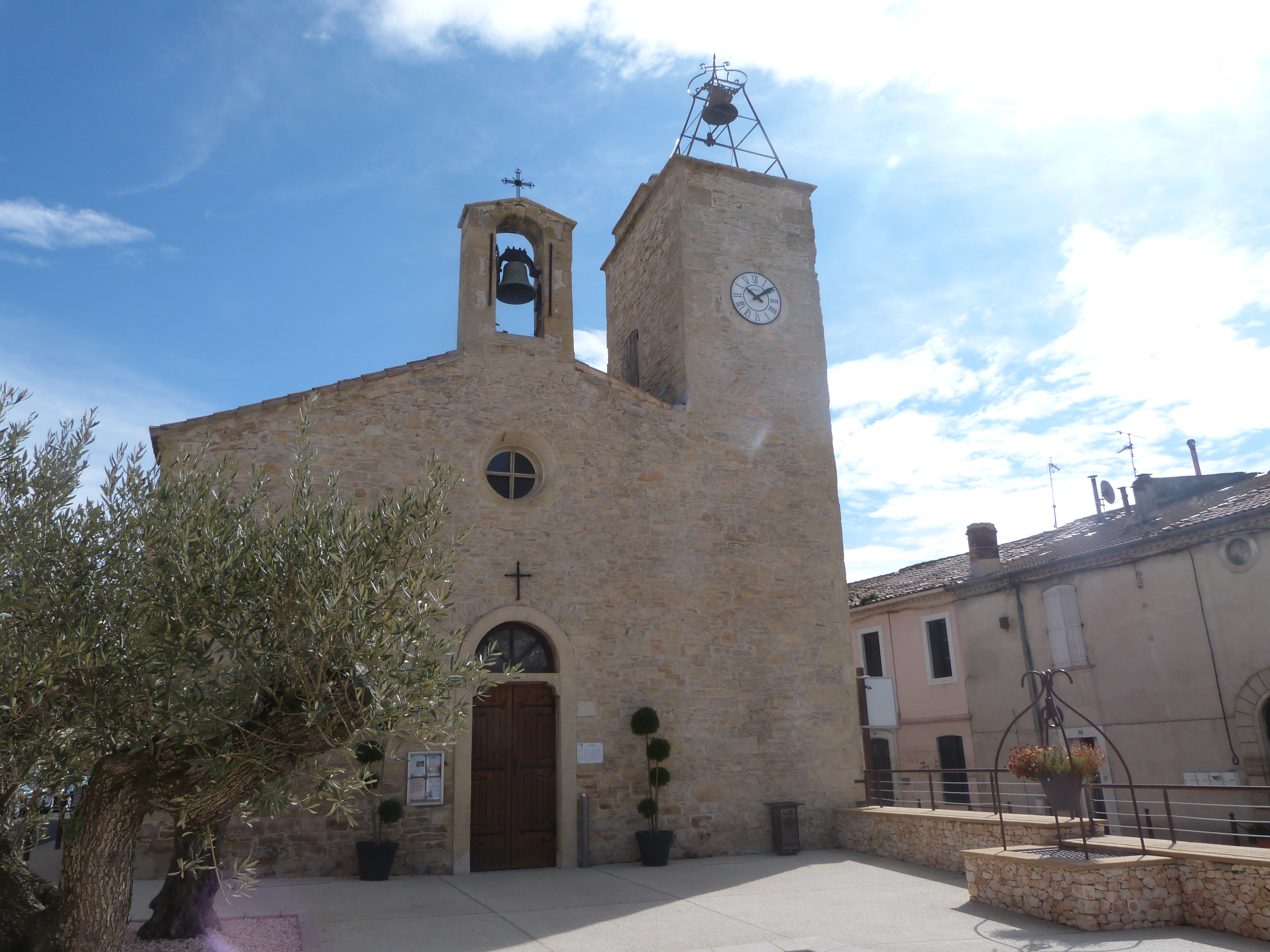
- The church in Uchaud

- Coat of arms
- Location of Uchaud
- Location within France Location within Occitanie
- Coordinates: 43°45′28″N 4°16′12″E
- Country: France
- Region: Occitania
- Department: Gard
- Arrondissement: Nîmes
- Canton: Vauvert
- Intercommunality: CC Rhôny Vistre Vidourle

Government
  - Mayor (2020–2026): Joffrey Léon
- Area^{1}: 8.8 km^{2} (3.4 sq mi)
- Elevation: 24 m (79 ft)
- Highest elevation: 102 m (335 ft)
- Lowest elevation: 15 m (49 ft)
- Population (2023): 4,879
  - Density: 550/km^{2} (1,400/sq mi)
- Demonym: Uchaudois
- Time zone: UTC+01:00 (CET)
  - Summer (DST): UTC+02:00 (CEST)
- INSEE/Postal code: 30333 /30620
- Website: www.uchaud.fr
- ^{1} French Land Register data, which excludes lakes, ponds, glaciers > 1 km^{2} (0.386 sq mi or 247 acres) and river estuaries.

Uchaud (French pronunciation: [yʃo]; Occitan: Uchau) is a commune in the Gard department in the Occitania region in Southern France.

== Transport ==
Uchaud station has rail connections to Nîmes, Avignon and Montpellier.

== Demographics ==
Historical population
Year	Pop.	±% p.a.
1968	1,378	—
1975	1,904	+4.73%
1982	2,339	+2.98%
1990	2,699	+1.81%
1999	3,284	+2.20%
2007	3,873	+2.08%
2012	4,203	+1.65%
2017	4,315	+0.53%
2023	4,879	+2.07%
Source: INSEE

== See also ==
- Communes of the Gard department
- Costières de Nîmes AOC
