= Aigues-Vives, Gard =

Commune in Occitanie, France

Aigues-Vives
- Commune
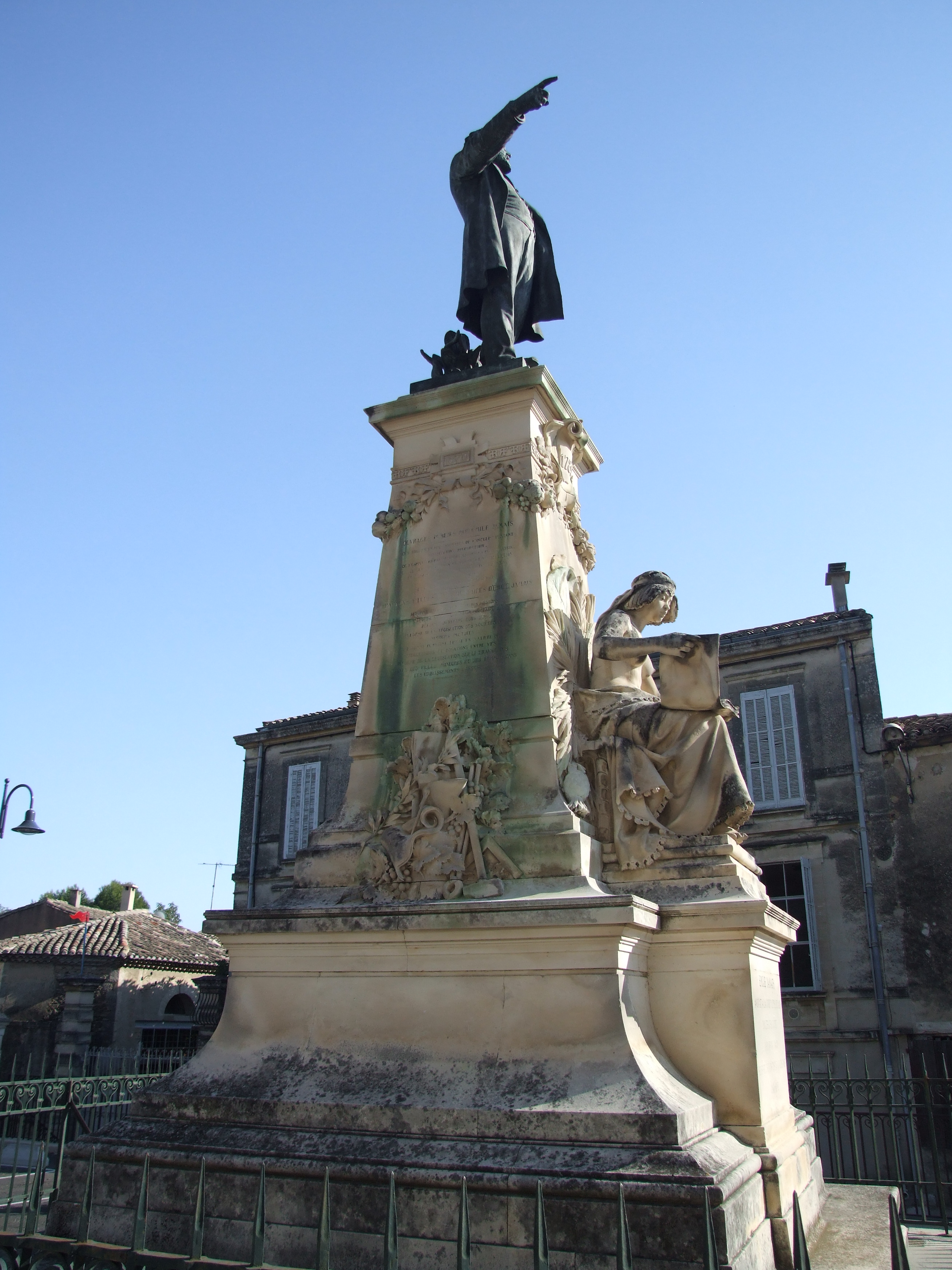
- Monument to Émile Jamais

- Coat of arms
- Location of Aigues-Vives
- Location within France Location within Occitanie
- Coordinates: 43°44′25″N 4°10′52″E
- Country: France
- Region: Occitania
- Department: Gard
- Arrondissement: Nîmes
- Canton: Vauvert
- Intercommunality: Rhôny Vistre Vidourle

Government
  - Mayor (2020–2026): Jacky Rey
- Area^{1}: 12 km^{2} (4.6 sq mi)
- Elevation: 29 m (95 ft)
- Highest elevation: 87 m (285 ft)
- Lowest elevation: 10 m (33 ft)
- Population (2023): 3,331
  - Density: 280/km^{2} (720/sq mi)
- Time zone: UTC+01:00 (CET)
  - Summer (DST): UTC+02:00 (CEST)
- INSEE/Postal code: 30004 /30670
- ^{1} French Land Register data, which excludes lakes, ponds, glaciers > 1 km^{2} (0.386 sq mi or 247 acres) and river estuaries.

Aigues-Vives (French pronunciation: [ɛɡ viv]; Occitan: Aigas Vivas) is a commune in the Gard department in southern France.

== Population ==
Historical population
Year	Pop.	±% p.a.
1968	1,506	—
1975	1,611	+0.97%
1982	1,908	+2.45%
1990	2,101	+1.21%
1999	2,331	+1.16%
2007	2,595	+1.35%
2012	3,105	+3.65%
2017	3,337	+1.45%
2023	3,331	−0.03%
Source: INSEE

== Education ==
The Groupe scolaire Jean Macé has maternelle (preschool/nursery) and primaire (primary) levels. It opened in 1913.

The collège (junior high school) serving the community is Collège de Gallargues-le-Montueux in Gallargues-le-Montueux. In addition to Aigues-Vives and Gallargues-le-Montueux, it also serves Aimargues. It opened in September 2014. As of 2017 it has about 600 students.

== Transport ==
The Aigues-Vives tramway was a 2 km (1.2 mi) long narrow-gauge railway with a gauge of 600 mm (1 ft 11 5/8 in), which operated from 1892 to 1901.

== See also ==
- Communes of the Gard department
