= Besset =

Commune in Occitanie, France

- Commune
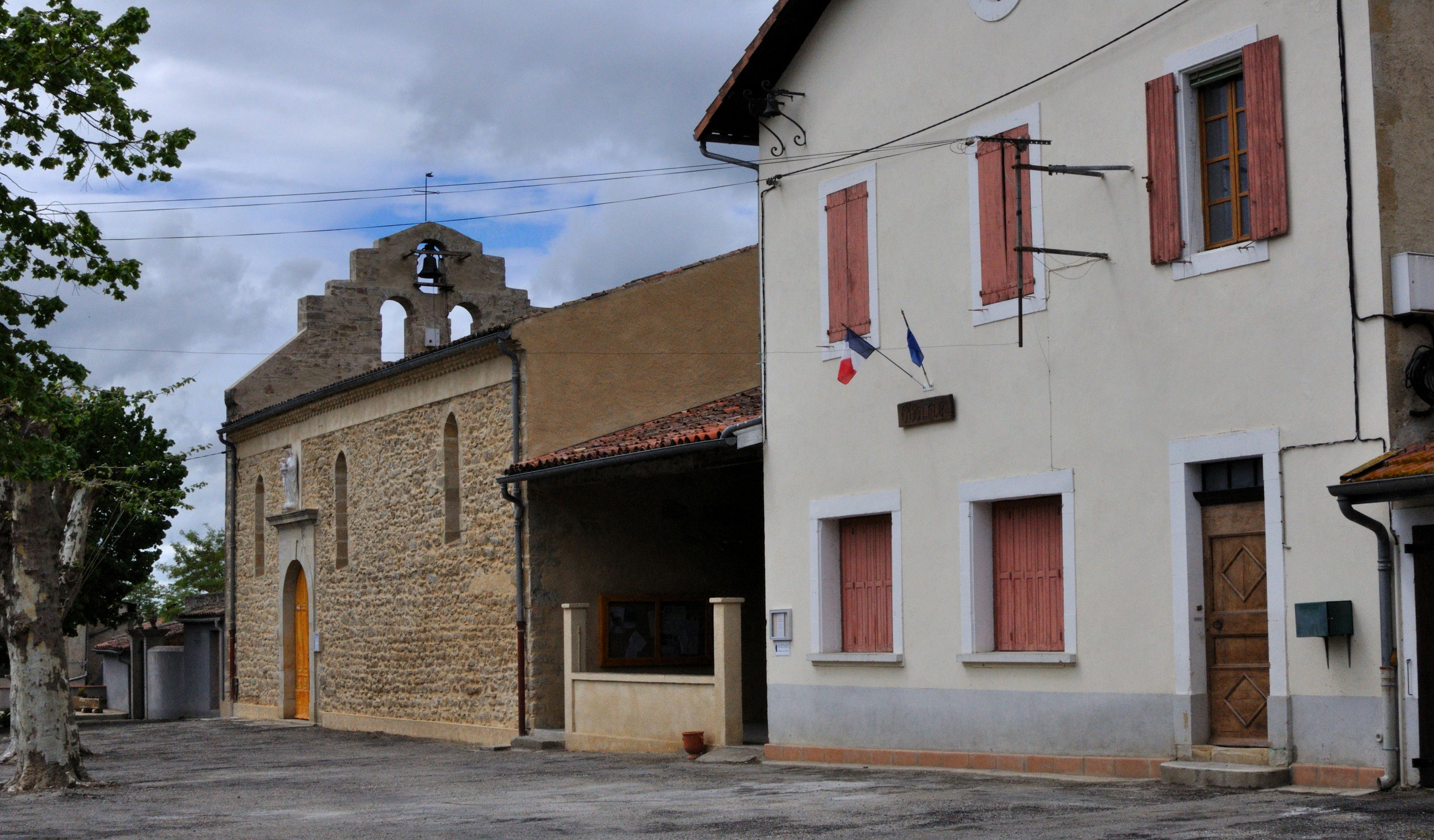
- Church and town hall

- Coat of arms
- Location of Besset
- Location within France Location within Occitanie
- Coordinates: 43°04′45″N 1°50′15″E
- Country: France
- Region: Occitania
- Department: Ariège
- Arrondissement: Pamiers
- Canton: Mirepoix
- Intercommunality: Pays de Mirepoix

Government
  - Mayor (2020–2026): Frédéric Valette
- Area^{1}: 8.13 km^{2} (3.14 sq mi)
- Elevation: 290 m (950 ft)
- Highest elevation: 480 m (1,570 ft)
- Lowest elevation: 279 m (915 ft)
- Population (2023): 163
  - Density: 20.0/km^{2} (51.9/sq mi)
- Time zone: UTC+01:00 (CET)
  - Summer (DST): UTC+02:00 (CEST)
- INSEE/Postal code: 09052 /09500
- ^{1} French Land Register data, which excludes lakes, ponds, glaciers > 1 km^{2} (0.386 sq mi or 247 acres) and river estuaries.

Besset is a commune in the Ariège department of southwestern France.

== Population ==
Historical population
Year	Pop.	±% p.a.
1968	88	—
1975	98	+1.55%
1982	114	+2.18%
1990	123	+0.95%
1999	119	−0.37%
2007	142	+2.23%
2012	154	+1.64%
2017	164	+1.27%
2023	163	−0.10%
Source: INSEE

Inhabitants of Besset are called Bessetois in French.

== See also ==
- Communes of the Ariège department
