= Vergèze =

- Commune
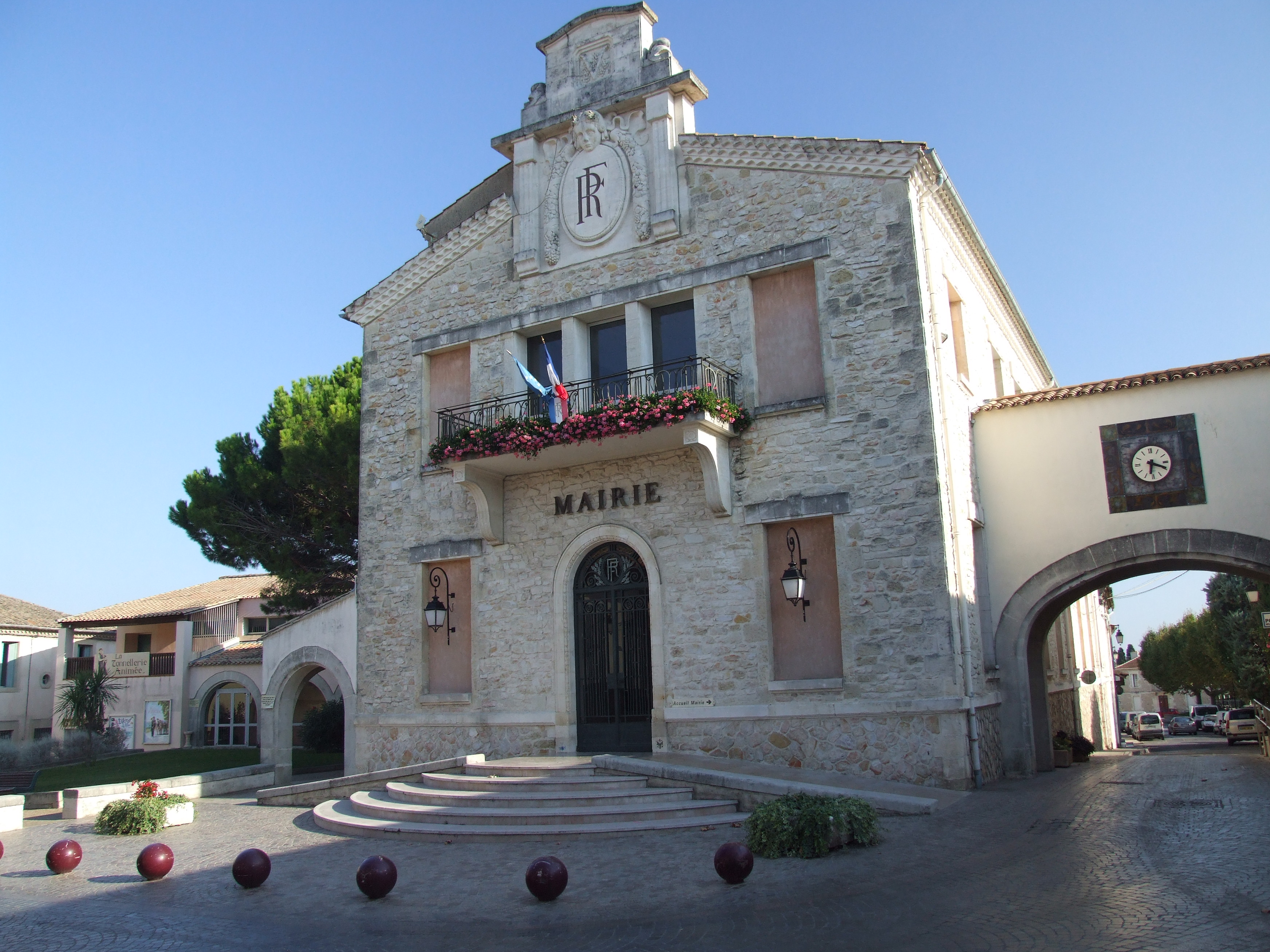
- Town hall

- Coat of arms
- Location of Vergèze
- Location within France Location within Occitanie
- Coordinates: 43°44′39″N 4°13′15″E
- Country: France
- Region: Occitania
- Department: Gard
- Arrondissement: Nîmes
- Canton: Vauvert
- Intercommunality: Rhôny Vistre Vidourle

Government
  - Mayor (2020–2026): Pascale Fortunat-Deschamps
- Area^{1}: 10.16 km^{2} (3.92 sq mi)
- Elevation: 30 m (98 ft)
- Highest elevation: 75 m (246 ft)
- Lowest elevation: 10 m (33 ft)
- Population (2023): 5,788
  - Density: 569.7/km^{2} (1,475/sq mi)
- Time zone: UTC+01:00 (CET)
  - Summer (DST): UTC+02:00 (CEST)
- INSEE/Postal code: 30344 /30310
- ^{1} French Land Register data, which excludes lakes, ponds, glaciers > 1 km^{2} (0.386 sq mi or 247 acres) and river estuaries.

Vergèze (French pronunciation: [vɛʁʒɛz]; Occitan: Vergesa) is a commune in the Gard department in southern France. Vergèze-Codognan station has rail connections to Nîmes, Avignon and Montpellier.

Located just south-east of the commune is the production facility for Perrier, a carbonated mineral water widely sold both in France and internationally.

== Population ==
Historical population
Year	Pop.	±% p.a.
1968	2,061	—
1975	2,258	+1.31%
1982	2,554	+1.78%
1990	3,135	+2.60%
1999	3,643	+1.68%
2007	3,958	+1.04%
2012	4,875	+4.26%
2017	5,188	+1.25%
2023	5,788	+1.84%
Source: INSEE

== International relations ==
Vergèze is twinned with Bârlad, Romania.

== See also ==
- Communes of the Gard department
- Perrier
