= Assier station =

Railway station in Assier, France

Coordinates: 44°40′27″N 1°52′13″E

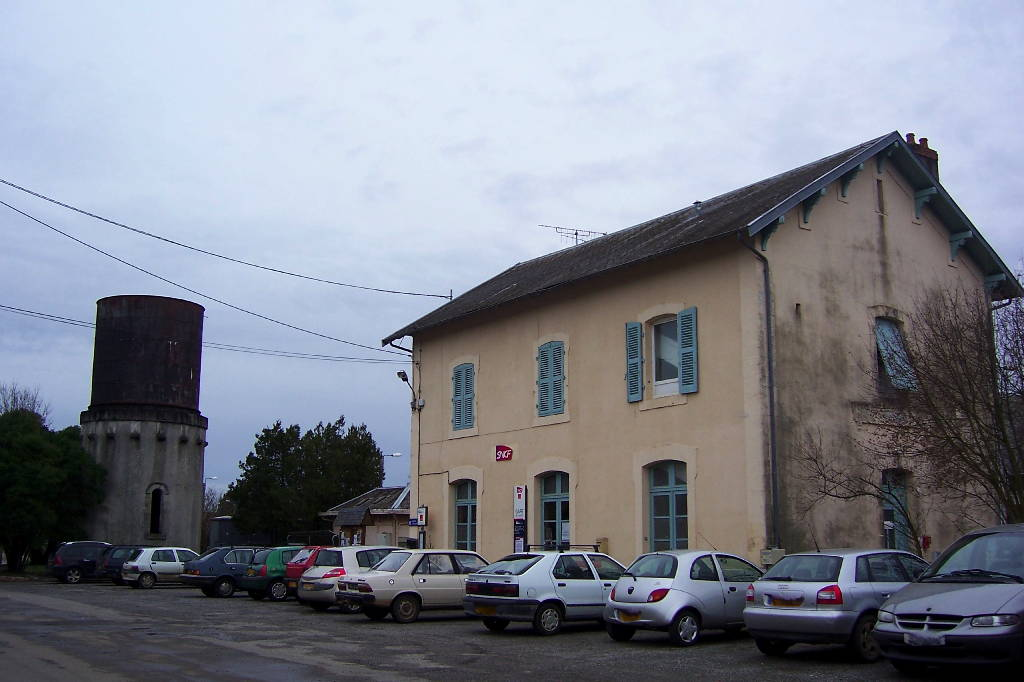
Assier station

Assier is a railway station in Assier, Occitanie, France. The station is on the Brive-Toulouse (via Capdenac) railway line. The station is served by Intercités de nuit (night train) and TER (local) services operated by SNCF.

== Train services ==
The following services currently call at Assier:

- night services (Intercités de nuit) Paris–Orléans–Figeac–Rodez–Albi
- local service (TER Occitanie) Brive-la-Gaillarde–Figeac–Rodez

Preceding station	SNCF	Following station
Gramat towards Paris-Austerlitz	Intercités (night)	Figeac towards Albi-Ville
Preceding station	TER Occitanie	Following station
Gramat towards Brive-la-Gaillarde	7	Figeac towards Rodez

== See also ==
- List of SNCF stations in Occitanie
