= Puybrun railway station =

Railway station in Puybrun, France

Puybrun
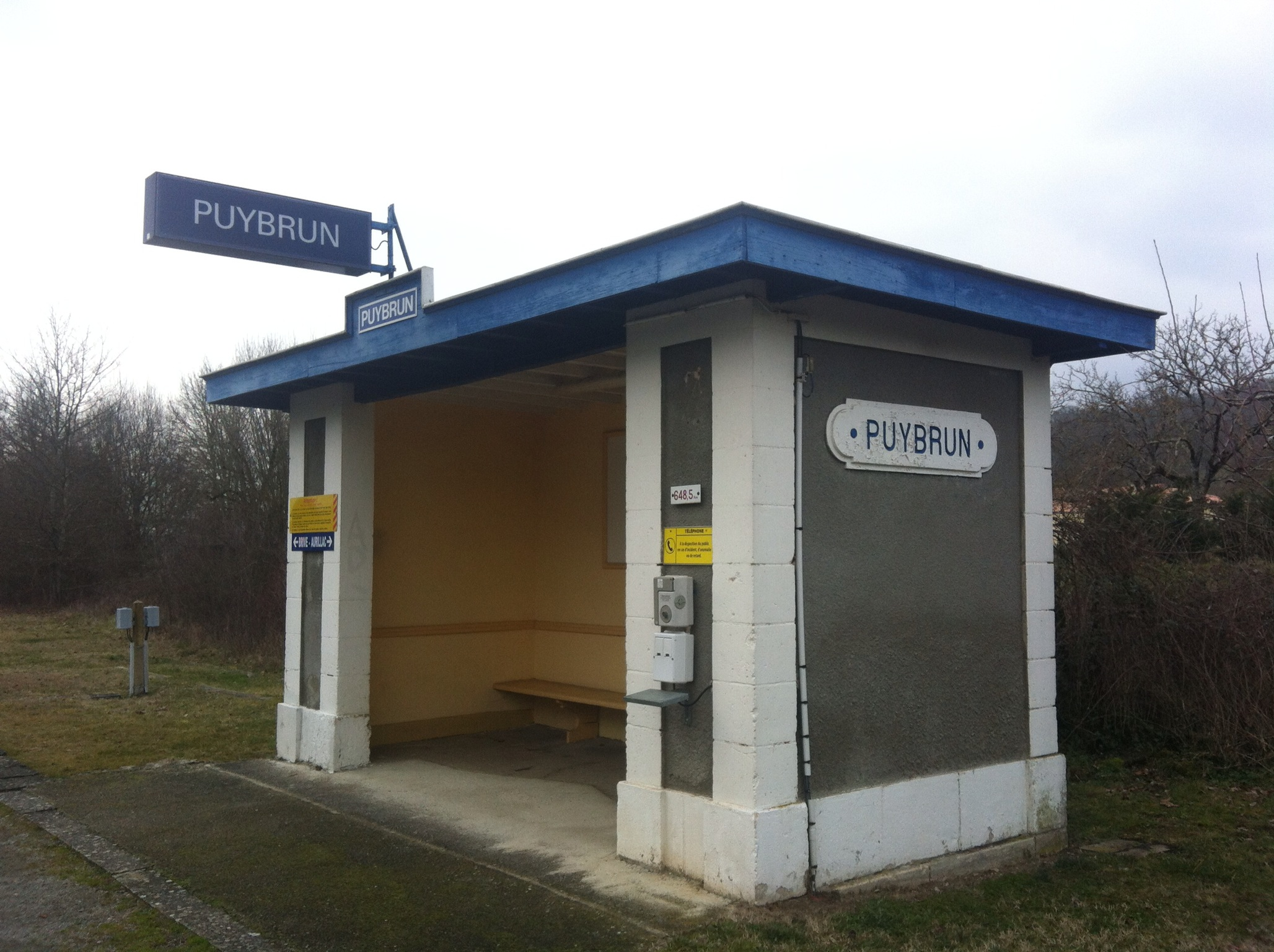
- Puybrun station

General information
- Location: Puybrun, Lot, Occitania, France
- Coordinates: 44°55′18″N 1°47′03″E
- Line: Brive-Toulouse (via Capdenac)
- Platforms: 1
- Tracks: 1

Other information
- Station code: 87594754

History
- Opened: 11 May 1891
Services
Preceding station	TER Auvergne-Rhône-Alpes	Following station
Saint-Denis-près-Martel towards Brive-la-Gaillarde	67	Bretenoux-Biars towards Aurillac
Location

Gare de Puybrun is a railway station located in the commune of Puybrun, in the Lot department, in the Occitanie region in southern France.

It is a passenger stop of the French National Railway Company (SNCF), served by TER trains.

== History ==
The Puybrun station was put into service on 11 May 1891 by the Compagnie du chemin de fer de Paris à Orléans (PO), when it opened for operation the section from Saint-Denis-près-Martel to Viescamp-sous-Jallès.

The station had a passenger building, with a central body with three openings, with a floor under a gable roof, framed by two small wings with an opening on the ground floor under a gable roof, it is a crossing station with two tracks and two platforms.

In 1896, the Compagnie du PO indicated that the station's revenue for the whole year was 44,971 francs.

Since becoming an SNCF passenger stop, the passenger building is closed becoming a private house, and the second track and the second platform no longer exist.

== Passenger service ==
=== Station ===
The platform is an unmanaged stopping point with free access. The station has a single track and a single platform.

=== Train services ===
Puybrun is served by TER Auvergne-Rhône-Alpes regional trains that operate between the stations of Brive-la-Gaillarde and Aurillac.

=== Other services ===
Parking is possible near the old passenger building.
