= Gramat station =

Railway station in Gramat, France

Coordinates: 44°46′23″N 1°43′20″E

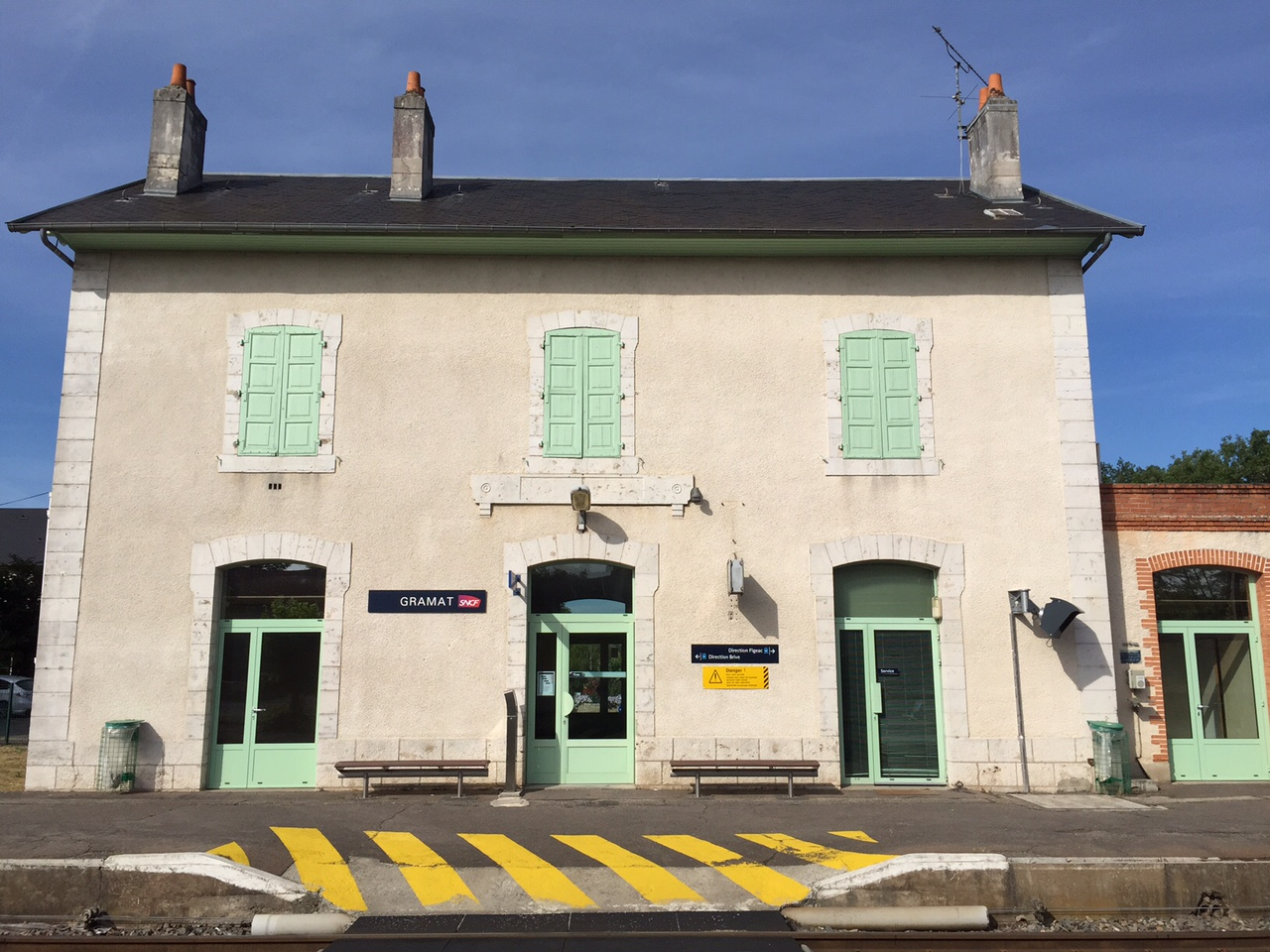
Gramat station building

Gramat is a railway station in Gramat, Occitanie, France. The station is on the Brive-Toulouse (via Capdenac) railway line. The station is served by Intercités de nuit (night train) and TER (local) services operated by SNCF.

== Train services ==
The following services currently call at Gramat:

- night services (Intercités de nuit) Paris–Orléans–Figeac–Rodez–Albi
- local service (TER Occitanie) Brive-la-Gaillarde–Figeac–Rodez

Preceding station	SNCF	Following station
Rocamadour-Padirac towards Paris-Austerlitz	Intercités (night)	Assier towards Albi-Ville
Preceding station	TER Occitanie	Following station
Rocamadour-Padirac towards Brive-la-Gaillarde	7	Assier towards Rodez
