= Turenne station =

Railway station in Turenne, France

Turenne
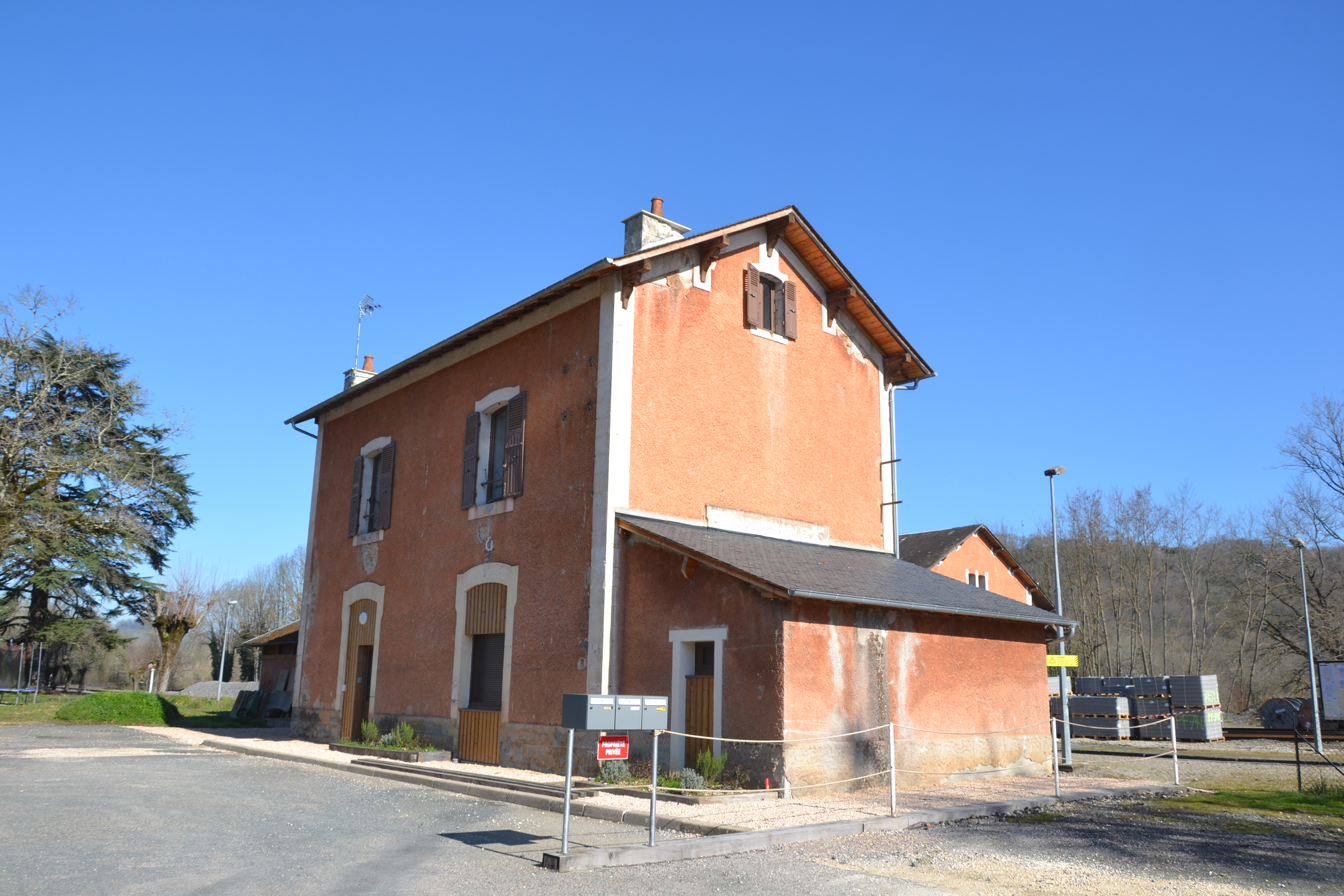
- Station building in 2024, seen from the parking lot.

General information
- Location: Turenne, Corrèze, Nouvelle-Aquitaine, France
- Coordinates: 45°02′19″N 1°35′57″E
- Line: Brive-Toulouse (via Capdenac)
- Platforms: 2
- Tracks: 2

Other information
- Station code: 87594556

History
- Opened: 10 November 1862
Services
Preceding station	TER Auvergne-Rhône-Alpes	Following station
Brive-la-Gaillarde Terminus	67	Les Quatre-Routes towards Aurillac
Preceding station	TER Occitanie	Following station
Brive-la-Gaillarde Terminus	7	Saint-Denis-Près-Martel towards Rodez
Location

Turenne is a railway station in Turenne, Nouvelle-Aquitaine, France. The station is located on the Brive-Toulouse (via Capdenac) line. The station is served by TER (local) services operated by SNCF.

== History ==
The Turenne station was put into service on 10 November 1862 by the Compagnie du chemin de fer de Paris à Orléans (PO), when it opened the section from Brive to Capdenac for operation.

From 1912 to 1931 it was also an interchange and transfer station with the metre-gauge network of the Tramways de la Corrèze.

In 2014, it was known as a passenger station of local interest (category C: less than 100,000 passengers per year from 2010 to 2011), which has two platforms (one of which is for the siding), a shelter and a level track crossing by the public (TVP).

== Passenger services ==
=== Station ===
An SNCF station, it has a passenger building, with a ticket office, open from Monday to Saturday and closed on Sundays.

=== Train services ===
The following services currently call at Turenne:

- local service (TER Auvergne-Rhône-Alpes) Brive-la-Gaillarde - Aurillac
- local service (TER Occitanie) Brive-la-Gaillarde - Figeac - Rodez

=== Other services ===
Vehicle parking is possible near the entrance to the station.

Preceding station	TER Auvergne-Rhône-Alpes	Following station
Brive-la-Gaillarde Terminus	67	Les Quatre-Routes towards Aurillac
Preceding station	TER Occitanie	Following station
Brive-la-Gaillarde Terminus	7	Saint-Denis-Près-Martel station towards Rodez
