= Railcoop =

- Type: Private cooperative company with collective interest (SCIC)
- Founded: 30 November 2019; 6 years ago
- Headquarters: Figeac, France
- Revenue: 119,879 (2022)
- Net income: −4,300,018 (2022)
- Website: https://www.railcoop.fr/

Railcoop was a French rail cooperative society, headquartered in Cambes, Lot. It was one of the first private passenger service companies to be created in the aftermath of the liberalisation of rail transportation in France and the end of the monopoly on passenger transit for the national railway operator SNCF. As the rail network remains state-owned by the public agency SNCF Réseau, Railcoop operated as an independent rail operator by purchasing slots for operating its services; its schedules were regularly communicated to the national transport regulation authority.

Railcoop was formally established during November 2019, at which point it set about recruiting members and raising funds with which to establish train operations; by February 2021, it had raised €1.3 million and had 5,500 shareholders, which included multiple local authorities. In September 2021, it was announced that Railcoop had received its rail operator license, and obtained confirmation of the necessary train paths for its initial operations. Two months later, the organisation launched its first train service, hauling freight three times per week between Figeac and Toulouse; this was increased to a daily service in January 2022.

From its founding, Railcoop's stated primary project was the reopening of a direct passenger service between Bordeaux and Lyon, a service which SNCF had opted to discontinue in 2014. It obtained its own rolling stock and petitioned for suitable train paths to be allocated. At one point, the passenger service was set to commence in June 2022, however, it had to be postponed until December 2022 and was then postponed further. Railcoop had ambitions to launch several other passenger services but none was realised before it went into liquidation in April 2024.

== History ==
During 2009, liberalisation reforms were implemented in France, resulting in the opening of the rail transport market for international services. Shortly thereafter, the Italian private company Thello announced plans to operate its own service between the cities of Paris and Venice. During 2020, the national flag carrier Air France was ordered by the French government to reduce its domestic flights that competed with rail travel in an effort to promote a shift in the travelling public towards the latter medium. French authorities were reportedly keen to welcome competition to its rail market, additional moves in this direction were implemented during the early 2020s. Despite this, there has been criticism voiced that the French rail sector is unwelcoming to new entrants.

Operating in the context of a very weak use of the railways within France's low-populated areas and the dominance of high speed trains on major trunk routes, Railcoop aims to re-develop medium-size rail connections. During the early 2010s, Railcoop was initially structured as a not-for-profit or voluntary association; it became a "cooperative society aiming at a collective interest" (SCIC), the first such entity, in November 2019. By this point, the organisation had gained the backing of a wide range of investors, including €500,000 from the regional government of Grand Est, to support its ambitions. Reportedly, Railcoop was required to have a minimum share capital of €1.5 million as well as recruit 3,000 members in order to obtaining a railway operating license. By February 2021, the organisation had reportedly raised €1.3 million and had 5,500 shareholders, including multiple local authorities.

On 9 June 2020, Railcoop confirmed its intentions with France's Regulatory Transport Authority (ART), which investigated whether the planned service conflicted with any existing public service. The same year, the recruitment of 100 staff members commenced. In September 2021, it was announced that Railcoop had received its rail operator license, a necessary step towards operating its own train services. That same month, French authorities confirmed the necessary train paths for such services to be run; furthermore, the organisation was closing in on obtaining its safety certificate, which would enable services to commence shortly thereafter. In October 2023 it was placed in receivership and was liquidated by the courts on 29 April 2024.

== Services ==
On 15 November 2021, Railcoop launched a freight haulage service between Figeac and Toulouse, traversing the 180 km (110 mi) freight line from Decazeville, via Capdenac to Saint-Jory. Hauling mainly agricultural and industrial products, the rolling stock comprised a pair of locomotives provided by DB Cargo while 24 wagons were leased from Ermewa. Initially being operated three times per week, the frequency was increased to daily in January 2022. This service is operated on an on-demand basis. The company has reportedly held talks with as many as 30 different companies to discuss options for fulfilling their freight needs by its rail services.

The main project of the company was the Bordeaux-Lyon direct link, which was withdrawn by SNCF in 2014. The service was intended to run three times per day, one of which would be an overnight train. These were to call at destinations such as Périgueux, Limoges, Guéret, Montluçon, and Roanne, had a projected journey time of six hours and 47 minutes, as well as a forecast demand of 690,000 passengers that would use the service each year. The launch date was at one point expected to occur in June 2022, but was postponed to December amid allegations that SNCF was unable to allocate suitable train paths for the service to be run. It was later put back to 2024 with the service plans scaled back, but the company was liquidated before any trains ran.

Initially efforts by the organisation to acquire its own rolling stock were centred around locomotive-hauled rakes of coaches with which it intended to operate the service. Instead, by mid 2022, Railcoop had purchased nine SNCF Class X 72500s and commenced an internal refurbishment of each unit. In the long term, the organisation stated its preference for obtaining Coradia Liner bi-mode multiple units, the same class used by SNCF on non-electrified intercity routes. Passengers were to be provisioned with various onboard services and comfort enhancement features; the trains have been configured with catering facilities, large luggage storage areas (suitable for skis and surfboards), and a dedicated children's play area. Furthermore, their engines and transmissions were overhauled with the aim of improving their reliability.

Railcoop had ambitions to operate additional routes within France. The company publicly stated its expectation to reinvest over half of any profits generated into the business' development. During 2023, the company hopes to operate services between Toulouse and Rennes, as well as Lyon and Thionville. None of these plans was realised before liquidation.

== See also ==
- European Sleeper
