= Rocamadour–Padirac station =

Railway station in Rocamadour, France

Coordinates: 44°49′06″N 1°39′27″E

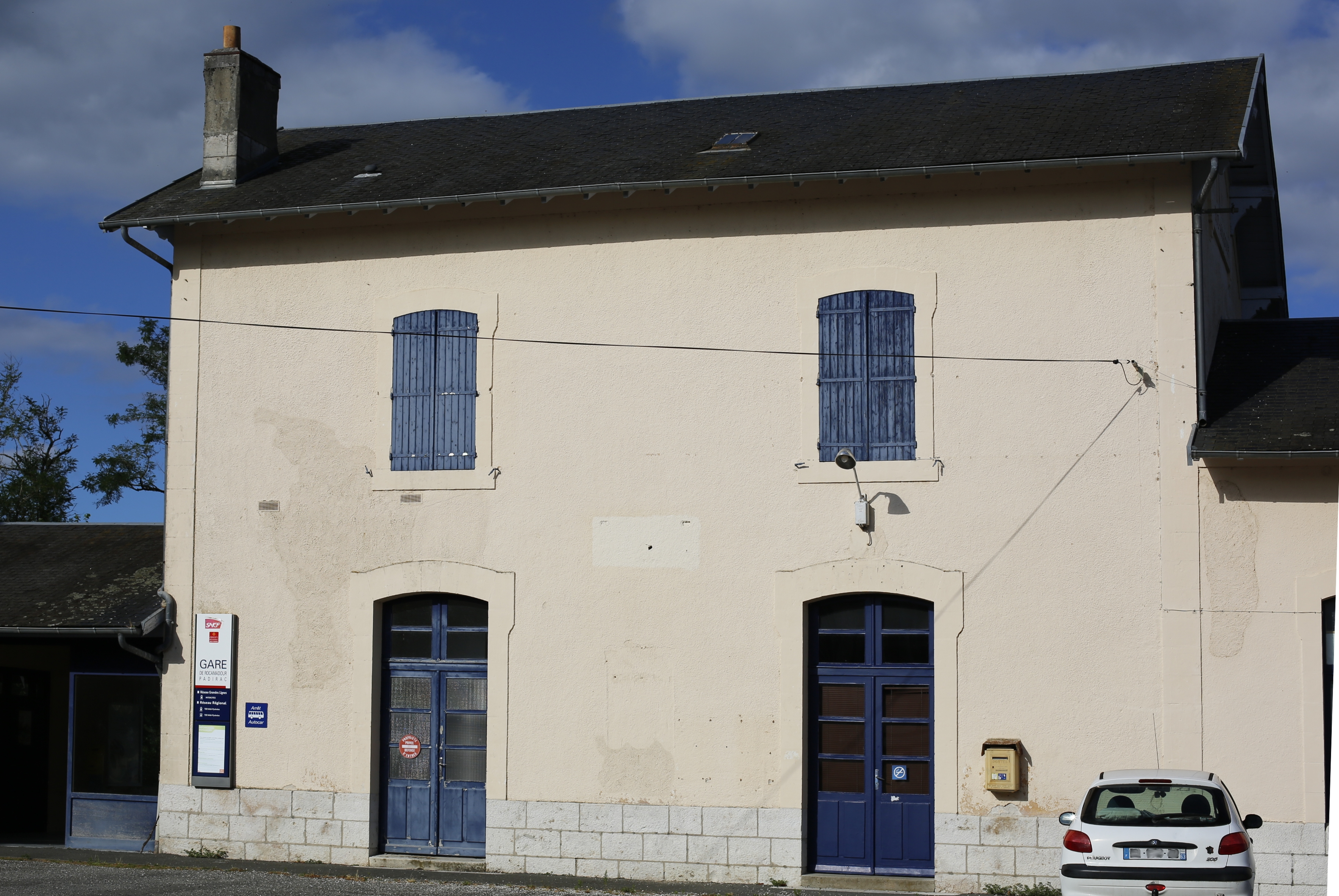
The station in 2013.

Rocamadour-Padirac is a railway station 4.6 km (2.9 mi) northeast of Rocamadour and 8 km west of Padirac, Occitanie, France. The station is also close to Alvignac. The station is on the Brive–Toulouse (via Capdenac) railway line. The station is served by Intercités de nuit (night train) and TER (local) services operated by SNCF.

== Train services ==
The following services currently call at Rocamadour-Padirac:

- night services (Intercités de nuit) Paris–Orléans–Figeac–Rodez–Albi
- local service (TER Occitanie) Brive-la-Gaillarde–Figeac–Rodez

Preceding station	SNCF	Following station
Saint-Denis-près-Martel towards Paris-Austerlitz	Intercités (night)	Gramat towards Albi-Ville
Preceding station	TER Occitanie	Following station
Saint-Denis-près-Martel towards Brive-la-Gaillarde	7	Gramat towards Rodez
