= Les Quatre-Routes station =

Railway station in Les Quatre-Routes-du-Lot, France

Les Quatre-Routes
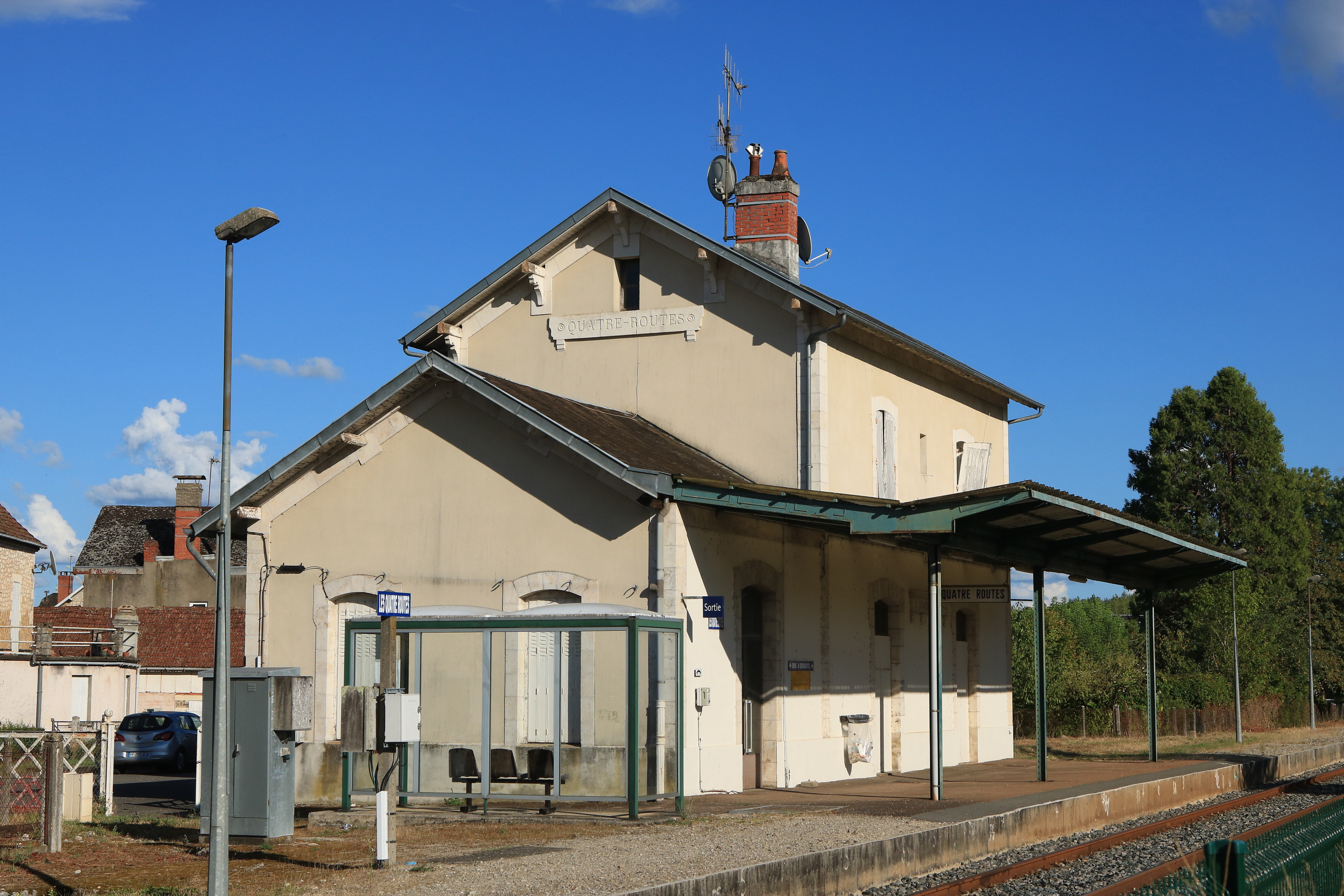
- Les Quatre-Routes station

General information
- Location: Les Quatre-Routes-du-Lot, Lot, Occitania, France
- Coordinates: 44°59′51″N 1°38′38″E
- Line: Brive–Toulouse (via Capdenac)
- Platforms: 1
- Tracks: 1

Other information
- Station code: 87594564

History
- Opened: 10 November 1862
Services
Preceding station	TER Auvergne-Rhône-Alpes	Following station
Turenne towards Brive-la-Gaillarde	67	Saint-Denis-près-Martel towards Aurillac
Preceding station	TER Occitanie	Following station
Turenne towards Brive-la-Gaillarde	7	Saint-Denis-près-Martel towards Rodez
Location

Les Quatre-Routes is a railway station in Les Quatre-Routes-du-Lot, Occitanie, France. The station is on the Brive-Toulouse (via Capdenac) railway line. The station is served by TER (local) services operated by SNCF.

== History ==
The Quatre-Routes station was put into service on 10 November 1862 by the Compagnie du chemin de fer de Paris à Orléans (PO), when it opened the section for operation from Brive to Capdenac.

In 1896, the Compagnie du PO indicated that the station's revenue for the whole year was 134,184 francs.

The goods hall was disused and transformed into a shopping centre at the end of the 1980s. The passenger building was closed on 1 October 1998 after multiple protests against the action.

In 2014, it was designated a passenger station of local interest (category C: less than 100,000 passengers per year from 2010 to 2011), which had a platform (single track) and a shelter.

== Passenger services ==
=== Station ===
The station is unstaffed.

=== Train services ===
The following services currently call at Les Quatre-Routes:

- local service (TER Auvergne-Rhône-Alpes) Brive-la-Gaillarde–Aurillac
- local service (TER Occitanie) Brive-la-Gaillarde–Figeac–Rodez

=== Other services ===
Public parking is available.

Preceding station	TER Auvergne-Rhône-Alpes	Following station
Turenne towards Brive-la-Gaillarde	67	Saint-Denis-près-Martel towards Aurillac
Preceding station	TER Occitanie	Following station
Turenne towards Brive-la-Gaillarde	7	Saint-Denis-près-Martel towards Rodez
