= Cransac station =

Railway station in Cransac, France

Coordinates: 44°31′23″N 2°16′16″E

Cransac
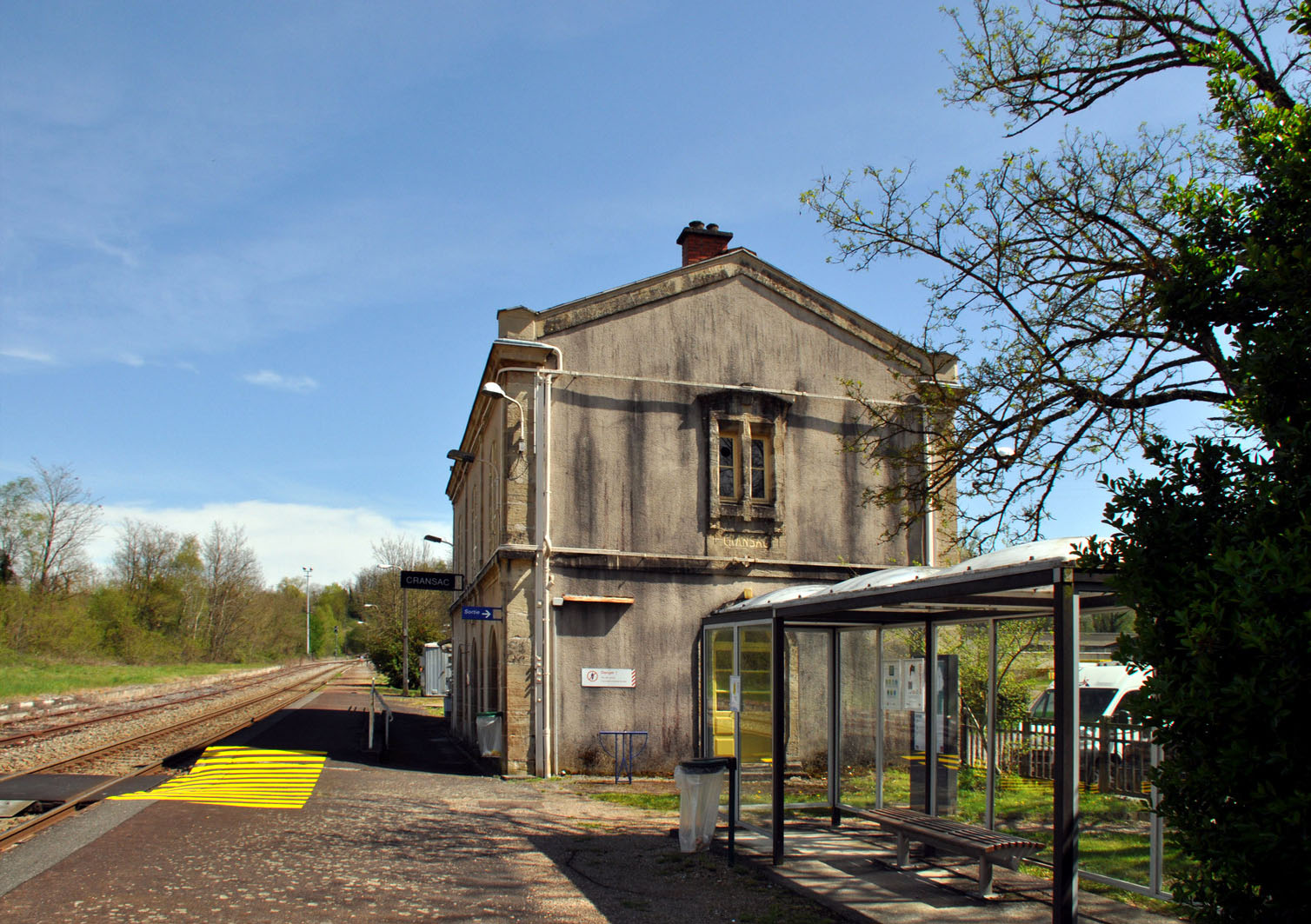

General information
- Owner: SNCF
- Line: Capdenac–Rodez railway

Other information
- Station code: 87613232

Services
Preceding station	SNCF	Following station
Aubin towards Paris-Austerlitz	Intercités (night)	Saint-Christophe towards Albi-Ville
Preceding station	TER Occitanie	Following station
Aubin towards Brive-la-Gaillarde	7	Saint-Christophe towards Rodez
Location

Cransac is a railway station in Cransac, Aveyron, Occitanie, France. The station is on the Capdenac–Rodez railway line. The station is served by Intercités de nuit (night train) and TER (local) services operated by SNCF.

== Train services ==
The following services currently call at Cransac:

- night services (Intercités de nuit) Paris–Orléans–Figeac–Rodez–Albi
- local service (TER Occitanie) Brive-la-Gaillarde–Figeac–Rodez
