= Najac station =

Railway station in Najac, France

Coordinates: 44°13′18″N 1°58′32″E

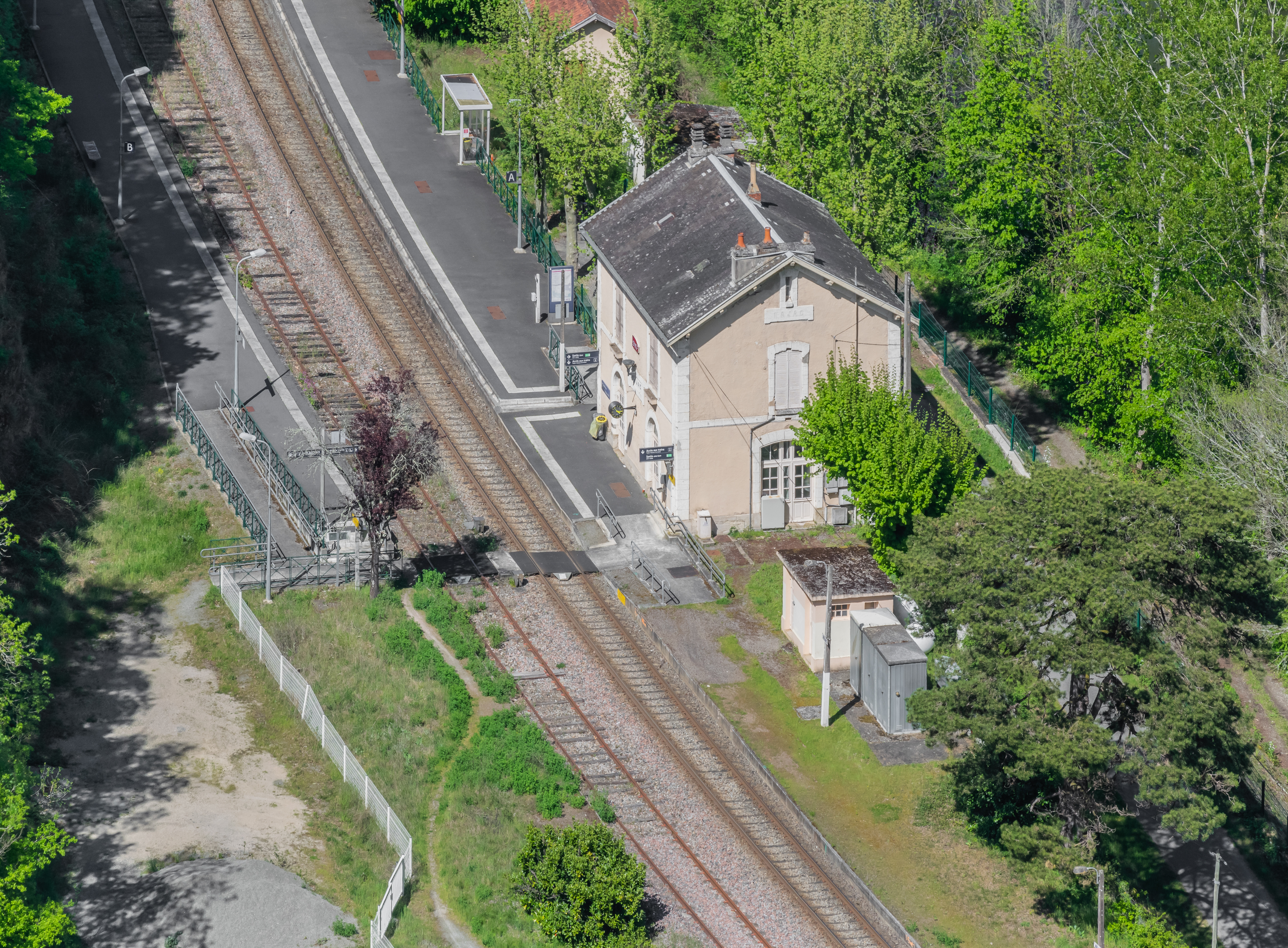
View of the train station in Najac

Najac is a railway station in Najac, Occitanie, France, on the Brive–Toulouse (via Capdenac) line. It is served by TER (local) services operated by SNCF.

== Train services ==
These services currently call at Najac:

- Local service (TER Occitanie) Toulouse–Figeac–Aurillac

Preceding station	TER Occitanie	Following station
Laguépie towards Toulouse	3	Villefranche-de-Rouergue towards Aurillac
