= Viviez–Decazeville station =

Railway station in Viviez, France

Coordinates: 44°33′20″N 2°13′07″E

Viviez-Decazeville is a railway station in Viviez and near Decazeville, Occitanie, France. The station is on the Capdenac–Rodez line. The station is served by Intercités de nuit (night train) and TER (local) services operated by SNCF.

== Train services ==
The following services currently call at Viviez-Decazeville:

- night services (Intercités de nuit) Paris–Orléans–Figeac–Rodez–Albi
- local service (TER Occitanie) Brive-la-Gaillarde–Figeac–Rodez

Preceding station	SNCF	Following station
Capdenac towards Paris-Austerlitz	Intercités (night)	Aubin towards Albi-Ville
Preceding station	TER Occitanie	Following station
Capdenac towards Brive-la-Gaillarde	7	Aubin towards Rodez
