= Figeac station =

Railway station in Figeac, France

Coordinates: 44°36′09″N 2°02′16″E

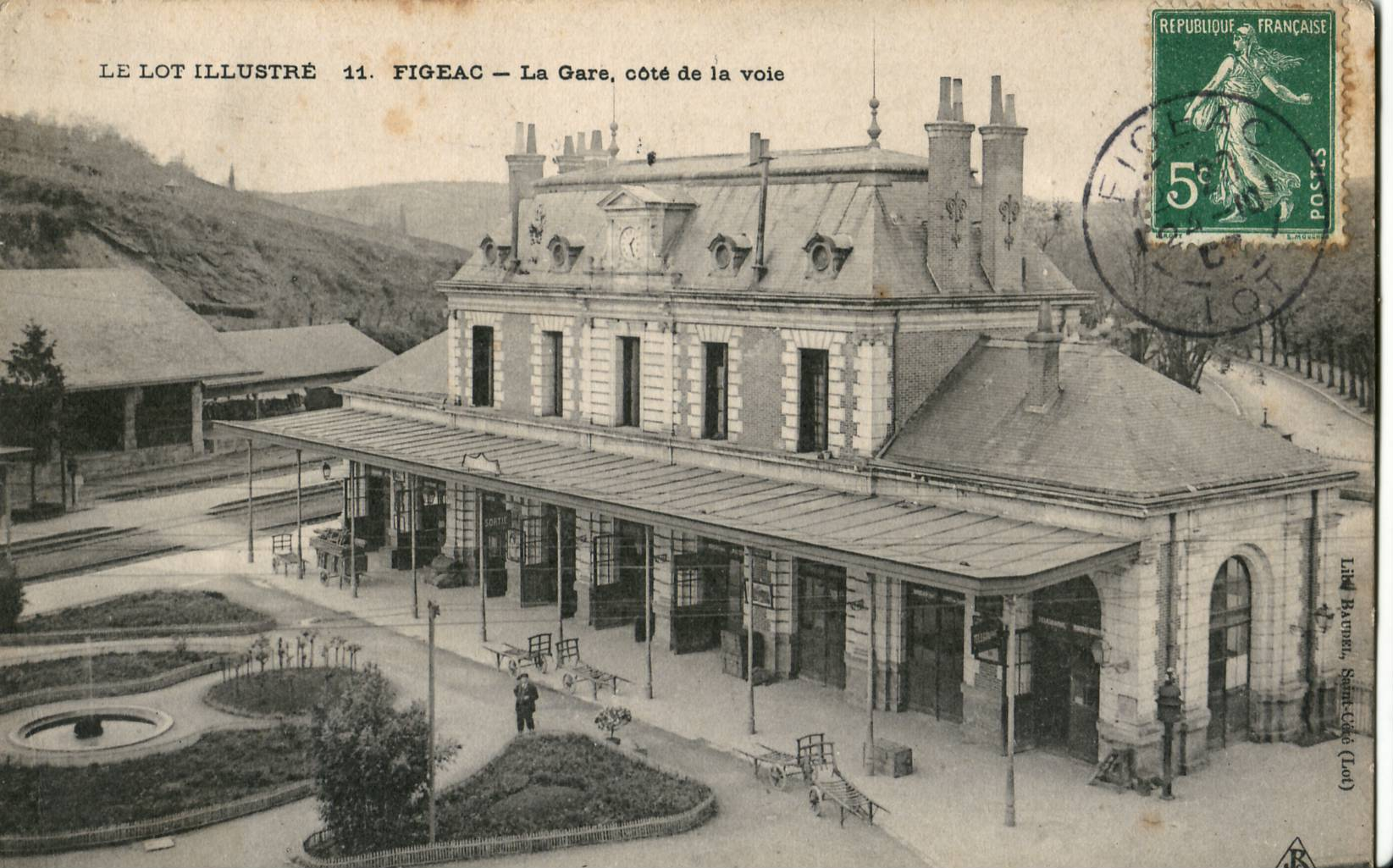
Figeac station, c. 1907

Figeac is a railway station in Figeac, Occitanie, France. The station is a keilbahnhof, situated at the junction of the Brive–Toulouse (via Capdenac) railway and Figeac–Arvant railway lines. The station is served by Intercités de nuit (night train) and TER (local) services operated by SNCF.

The station was mostly destroyed by a fire of mysterious origin overnight on 21–22 November 2018. Despite the efforts of around fifty firefighters from Figeac and surrounding areas, the station's smoke-stained walls were pretty much all that remained standing. An inquiry ruled the fire as "accidental," but questions remain. Reconstruction of the station began in 2021, and it re-opened to passengers in 2023.

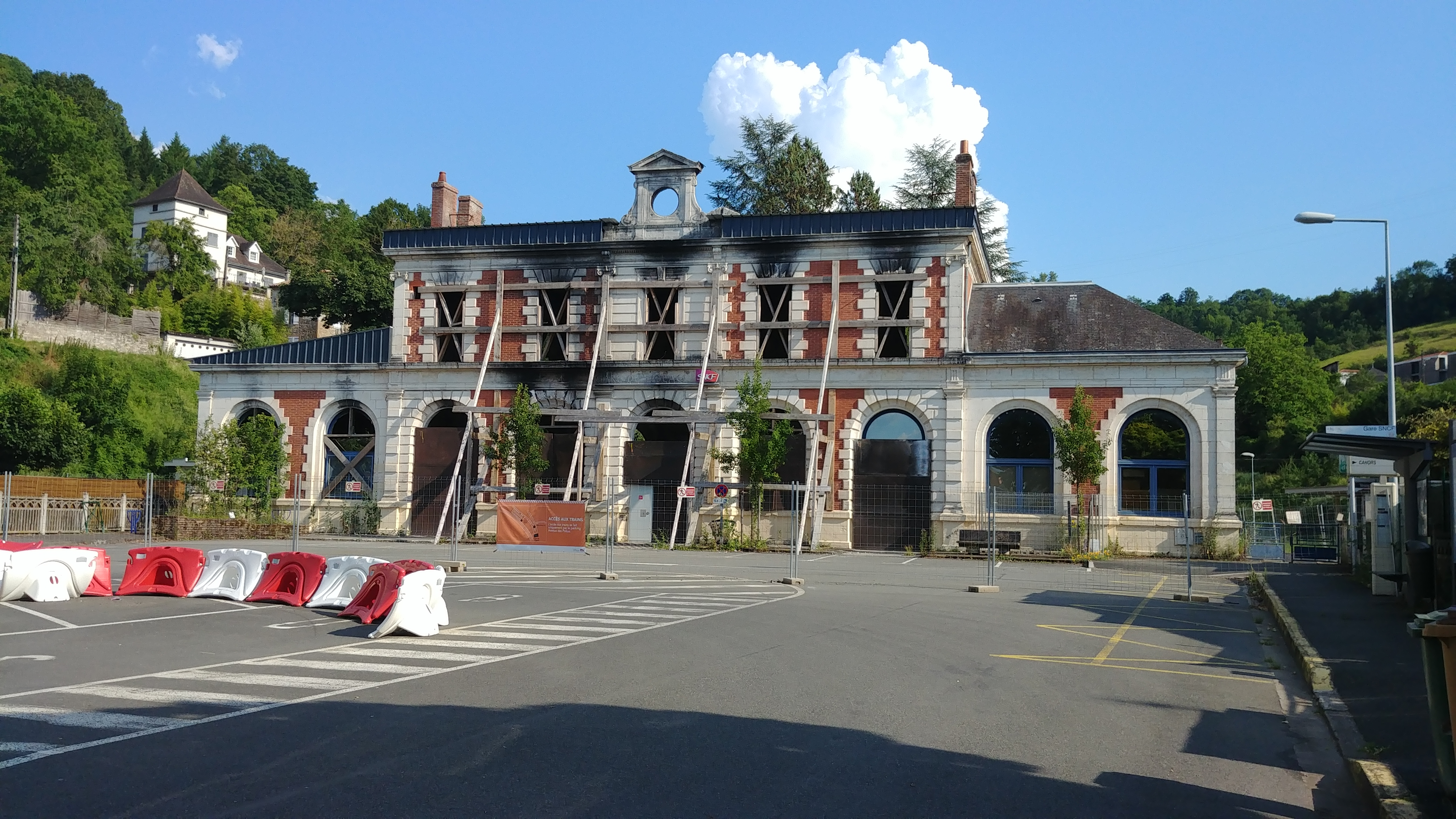
Gare Figeac summer 2020

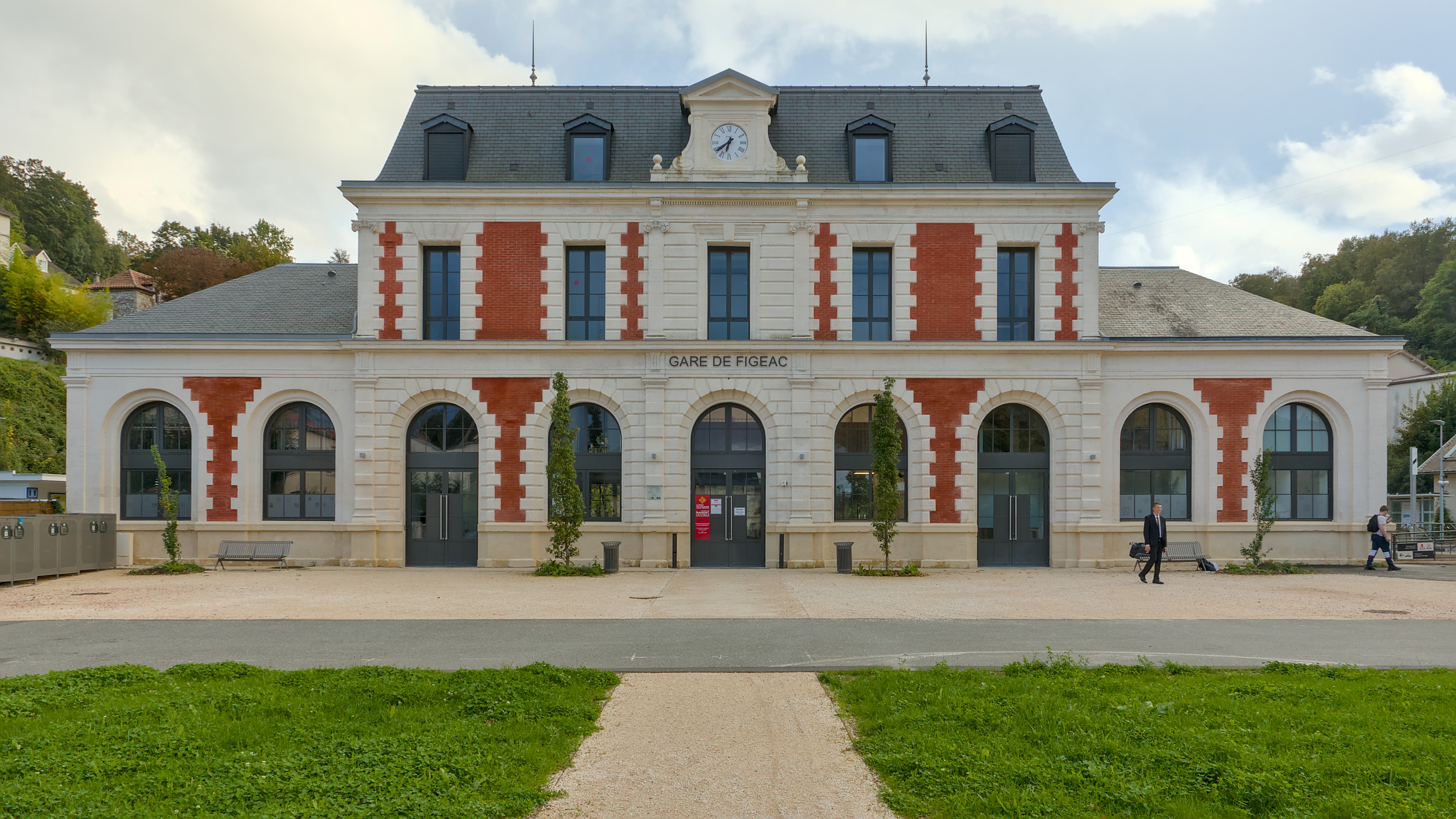
Station building after renovations in 2024

The station itself is located south of the river Célé, near the Hotel de Ville. It is easily accessed from the N122 and several departmental routes.

== Train services ==
The following services currently call at Figeac:

- night services (Intercités de nuit) Paris–Orléans–Figeac–Rodez–Albi
- local service (TER Occitanie) Toulouse–Figeac–Aurillac
- local service (TER Occitanie) Brive-la-Gaillarde–Figeac–Rodez

Preceding station	SNCF	Following station
Assier towards Paris-Austerlitz	Intercités (night)	Capdenac towards Albi-Ville
Preceding station	TER Occitanie	Following station
Capdenac towards Toulouse	3	Bagnac towards Aurillac
Assier towards Brive-la-Gaillarde	7	Capdenac towards Rodez

== Bus services ==
Bus Services leave the station for Decazeville.
