= Salles-Courbatiès station =

Railway station in Salles-Courbatiès, France

Coordinates: 44°28′27″N 2°04′40″E

Salles-Courbatiès is a railway station in Salles-Courbatiès, Occitanie, France. The station is on the Brive-Toulouse (via Capdenac) line. The station is served by TER (local) services operated by SNCF.

== Train services ==
The following services currently call at Salles-Courbatiès:

- Local service (TER Occitanie) Toulouse–Figeac–Aurillac

Preceding station	TER Occitanie	Following station
Villefranche-de-Rouergue towards Toulouse	3	Capdenac towards Aurillac
