= Aubin station =

Railway station in Aubin, France

Coordinates: 44°31′38″N 2°14′24″E

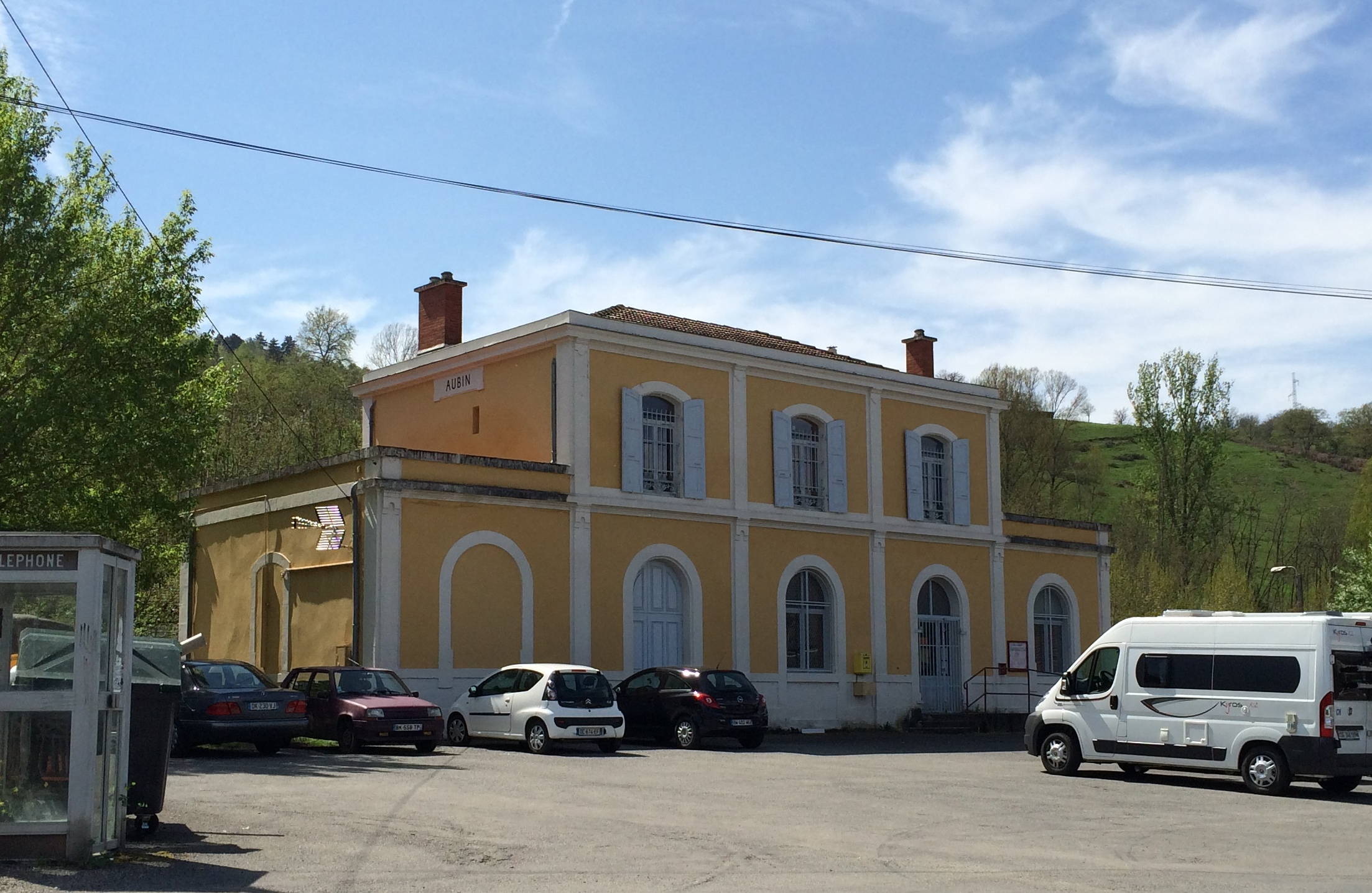
Gare d'Aubin (2015)

Aubin is a railway station in Aubin, Occitanie, France. The station is on the Capdenac–Rodez railway line. The station is served by Intercités de nuit (night train) and TER (local) services operated by SNCF.

== Train services ==
The following services currently call at Aubin:

- night services (Intercités de nuit) Paris–Orléans–Figeac–Rodez–Albi
- local service (TER Occitanie) Brive-la-Gaillarde–Figeac–Rodez

Preceding station	SNCF	Following station
Viviez-Decazeville towards Paris-Austerlitz	Intercités (night)	Cransac towards Albi-Ville
Preceding station	TER Occitanie	Following station
Viviez-Decazeville towards Brive-la-Gaillarde	7	Cransac towards Rodez
