= Capdenac station =

Railway station in France

Coordinates: 44°34′42″N 2°04′42″E

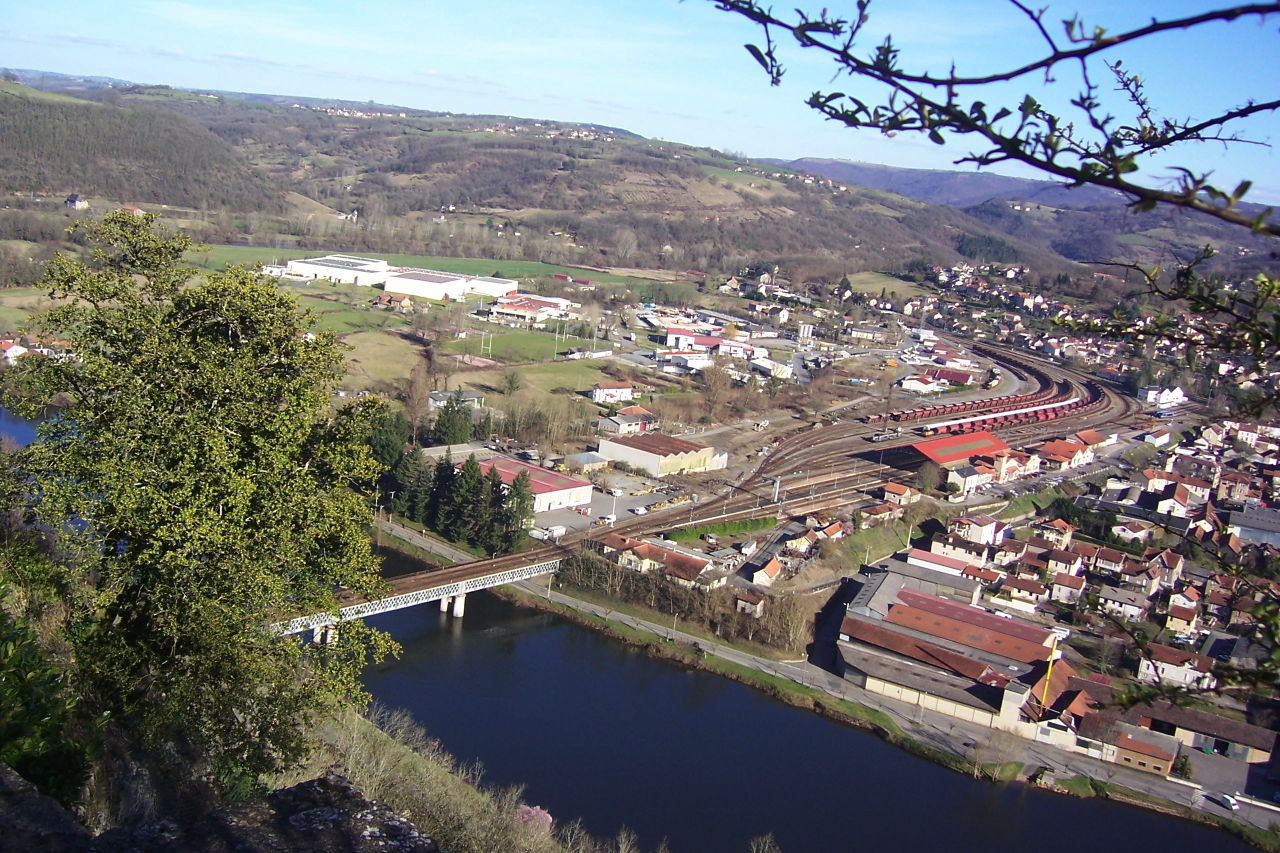
Capdenac station

Capdenac is a railway station in Capdenac-Gare, Occitanie, France. The station opened in 1858 (167 years ago) and is on the Brive–Toulouse (via Capdenac), Capdenac–Rodez and Cahors–Capdenac railway lines. The station is served by Intercités de nuit (night train) and TER (local) services operated by SNCF.

The line between Cahors and Capdenac was used by Quercyrail between 1993 and 2003 as a preserved railway, however the line is currently unused.

== Train services ==
The following services currently call at Capdenac:

- night services (Intercités de nuit) Paris–Orléans–Figeac–Rodez–Albi
- local service (TER Occitanie) Toulouse–Figeac–Aurillac
- local service (TER Occitanie) Brive-la-Gaillarde–Figeac–Rodez

Preceding station	SNCF	Following station
Figeac towards Paris-Austerlitz	Intercités (night)	Viviez-Decazeville towards Albi-Ville
Preceding station	TER Occitanie	Following station
Salles-Courbatiès towards Toulouse	3	Figeac towards Aurillac
Figeac towards Brive-la-Gaillarde	7	Viviez-Decazeville towards Rodez

== Bus services ==
Bus services leave the station for Decazeville.
