= Villefranche-de-Rouergue station =

Railway station in Villefranche-de-Rouergue, France

Coordinates: 44°20′49″N 2°02′09″E

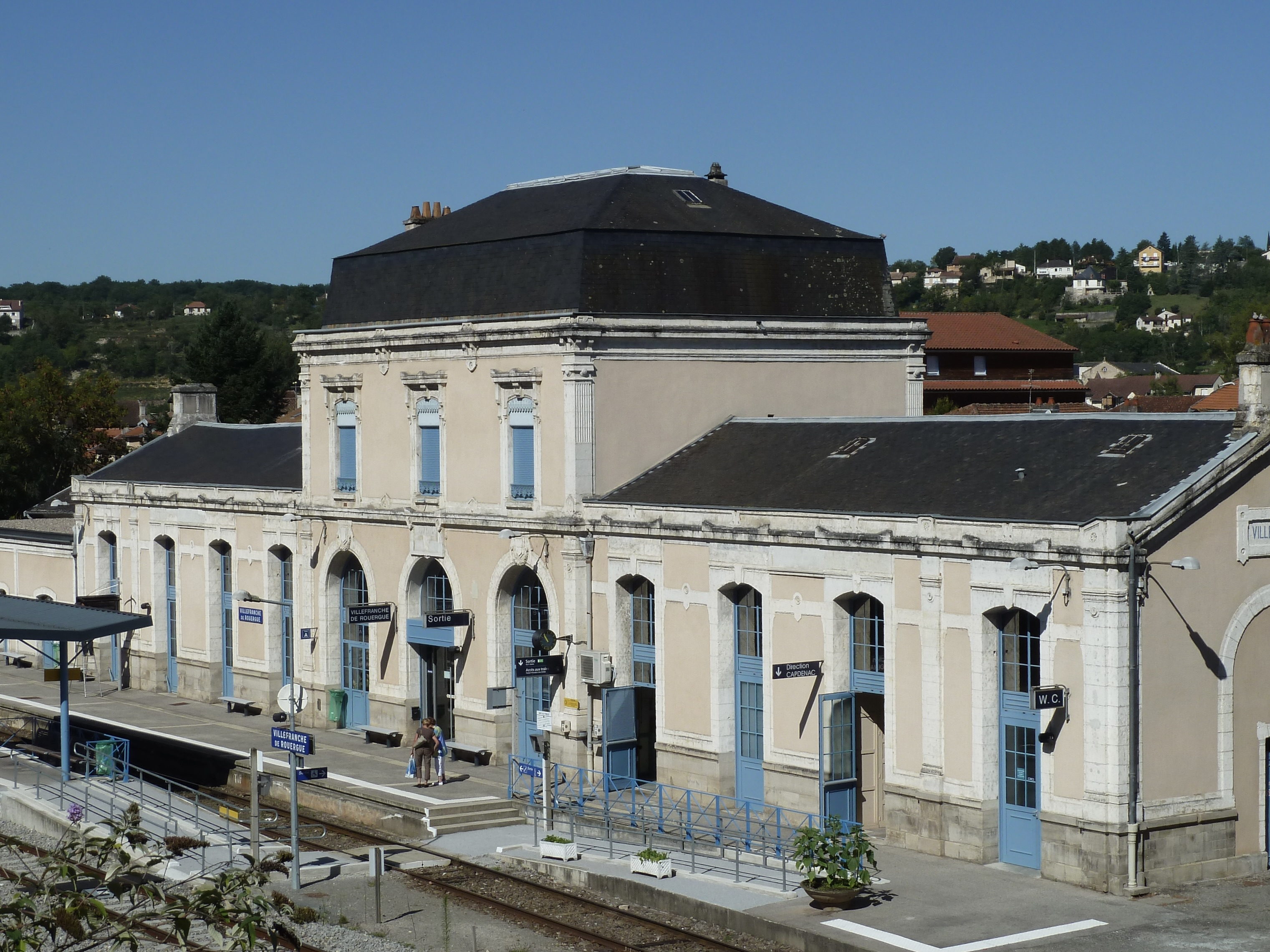
Villefranche-de-Rouergue station building

Villefranche-de-Rouergue is a railway station in Villefranche-de-Rouergue, Occitanie, France. The station is on the Brive-Toulouse (via Capdenac) line. The station is served by TER (local) services operated by SNCF.

== Train services ==
The following services currently call at Villefranche-de-Rouergue:

- local service (TER Occitanie) Toulouse–Figeac–Aurillac

| Preceding station | TER Occitanie | Following station |
|---|---|---|
| Najac towards Toulouse | 3 | Salles-Courbatiès towards Aurillac |
