= Albi-Madeleine station =

Railway station in Albi, France

Coordinates: 43°56′16″N 2°08′29″E

Albi-Madeleine
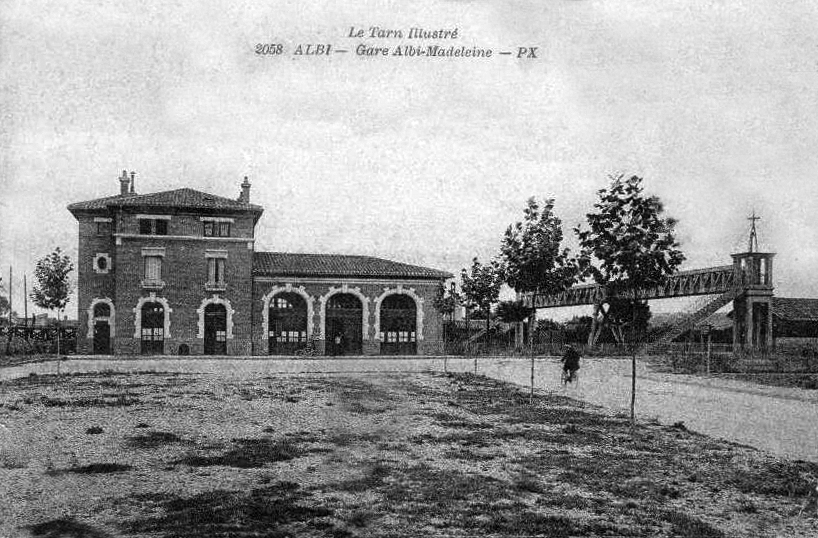
- Passenger building at Albi-Madeleine station around 1914

General information
- Location: Place de la Résistance; 81000 Albi; Tarn, France
- Line: Castelnaudary–Rodez railway
- Platforms: 3
- Tracks: 3

Other information
- Station code: 87615195

History
- Opened: 1857; 169 years ago

Services
Preceding station	SNCF	Following station
Carmaux towards Paris-Austerlitz	Intercités (night)	Albi-Ville Terminus
Preceding station	TER Occitanie	Following station
Albi-Ville towards Toulouse	2	Carmaux towards Rodez
Location

Albi-Madeleine station (French: Gare d'Albi-Madeleine) is a railway station in Albi, Occitanie, France. The original station opened in 1857 and the current station opened in 1899. Located on the Toulouse to Rodez railway line, the station is served by Intercités de Nuit (night train) and TER (local) services.

The original station was called Albi-Midi, when it opened on 7 December 1857.

== Train services ==
The following services currently call at Albi-Madeleine:

- night services (Intercités de nuit) Paris–Orléans–Figeac–Rodez–Albi
- local service (TER Occitanie) Toulouse–Albi–Rodez
