= Saint-Christophe station =

Railway station in Saint-Christophe-Vallon, France

Coordinates: 44°27′49″N 2°24′31″E

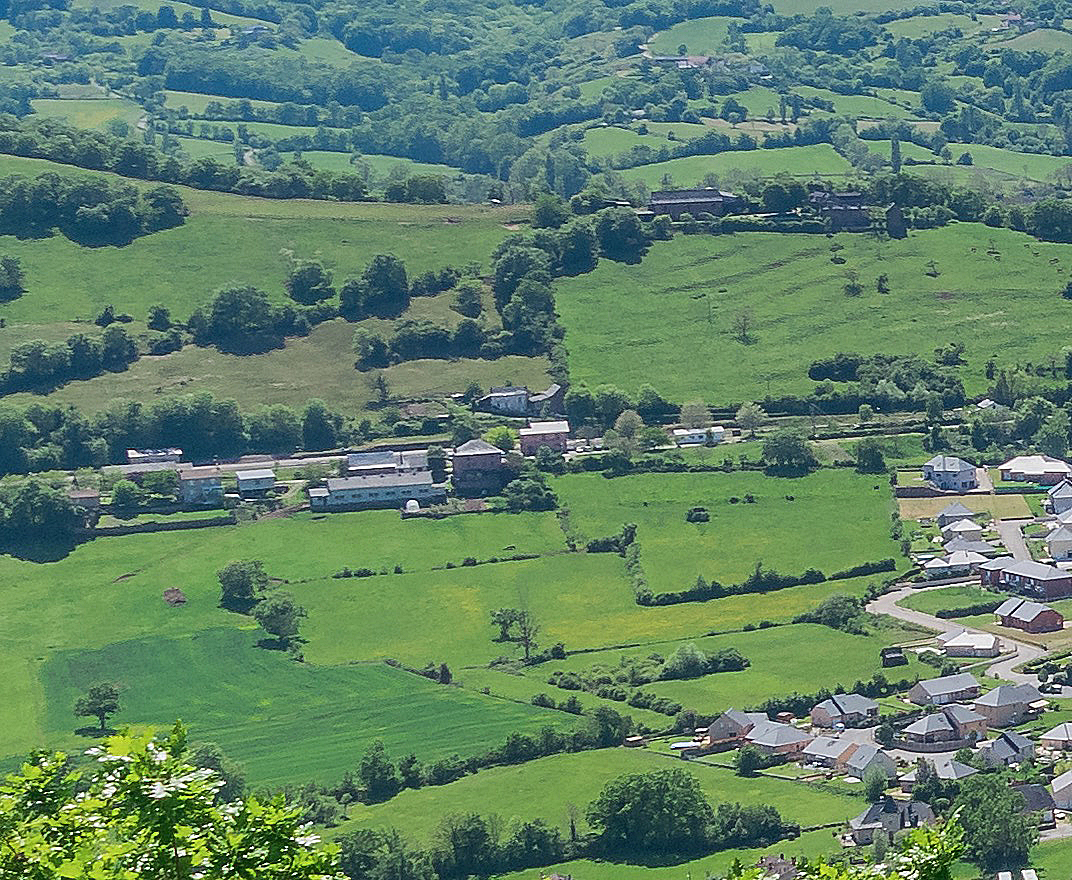
View on Saint-Christophe-Vallon with Saint-Christophe station in the center of the photo

Saint-Christophe is a railway station in Saint-Christophe-Vallon, Aveyron, Occitanie, France. The station is on the Capdenac–Rodez railway line. The station is served by Intercités de nuit (night train) and TER (local) services operated by SNCF.

== Train services ==
The following services currently call at Saint-Christophe:

- night services (Intercités de nuit) Paris–Orléans–Figeac–Rodez–Albi
- local service (TER Occitanie) Brive-la-Gaillarde–Figeac–Rodez

Preceding station	SNCF	Following station
Cransac towards Paris-Austerlitz	Intercités (night)	Rodez towards Albi-Ville
Preceding station	TER Occitanie	Following station
Cransac towards Brive-la-Gaillarde	7	Rodez Terminus
