= Carmaux station =

Railway station in Carmaux, France

Coordinates: 44°02′54″N 2°09′11″E

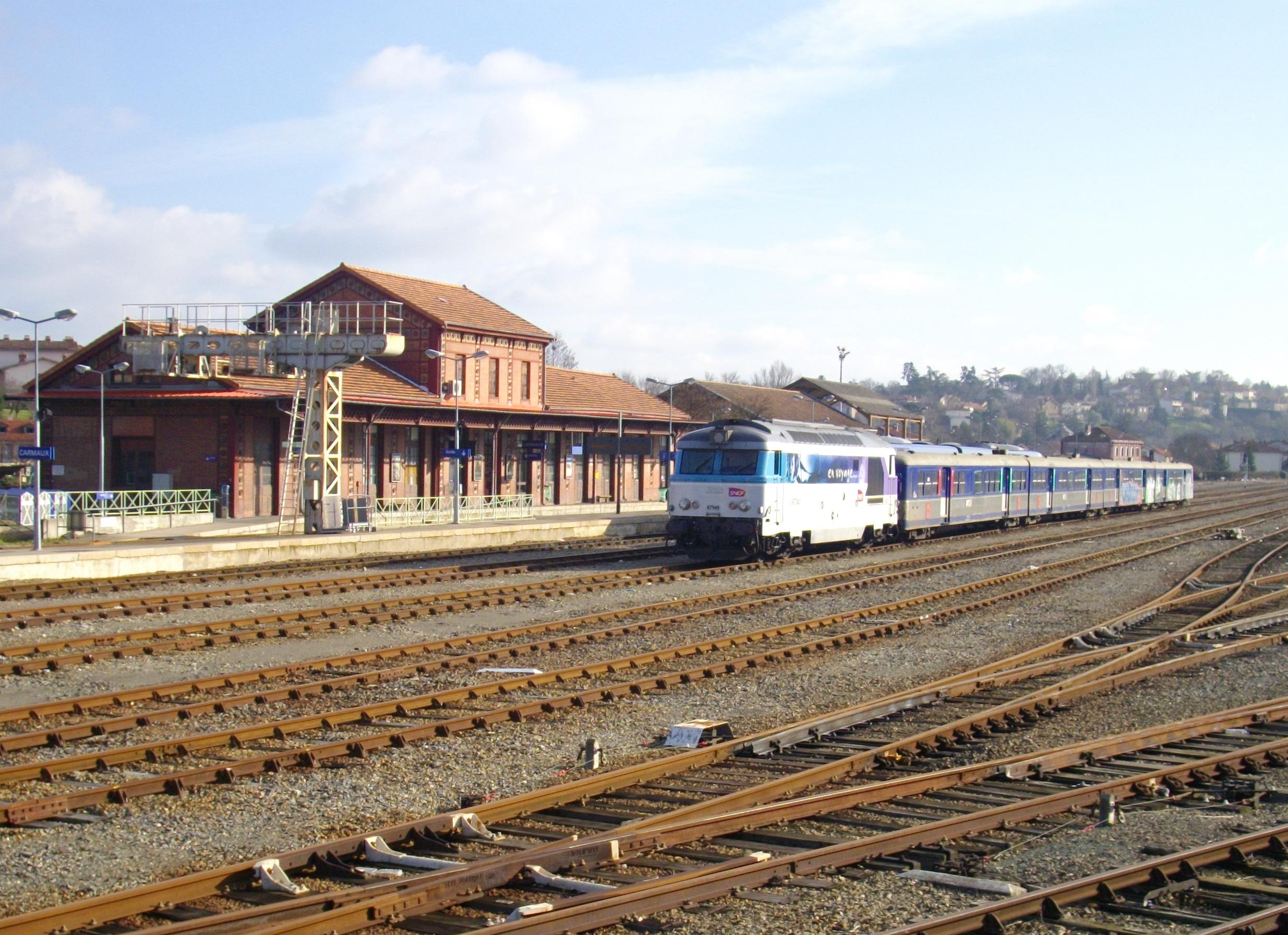
Carmaux station with a BB 67400 engine

Carmaux is a railway station in Carmaux, Occitanie, France. The station opened in 1906. Located on the Toulouse to Rodez railway line, the station is served by Intercités de nuit (night train) and TER (local) services. The original station opened on 9 November 1857 (168 years ago).

== Train services ==
The following services currently call at Carmaux:

- night services (Intercités de nuit) Paris–Orléans–Figeac–Rodez–Albi
- local service (TER Occitanie) Toulouse–Albi–Rodez

Preceding station	SNCF	Following station
Rodez towards Paris-Austerlitz	Intercités (night)	Albi-Madeleine towards Albi-Ville
Preceding station	TER Occitanie	Following station
Albi-Madeleine towards Toulouse	2	Tanus towards Rodez
