= Vayrac station =

Railway station in Vayrac, France

Vayrac
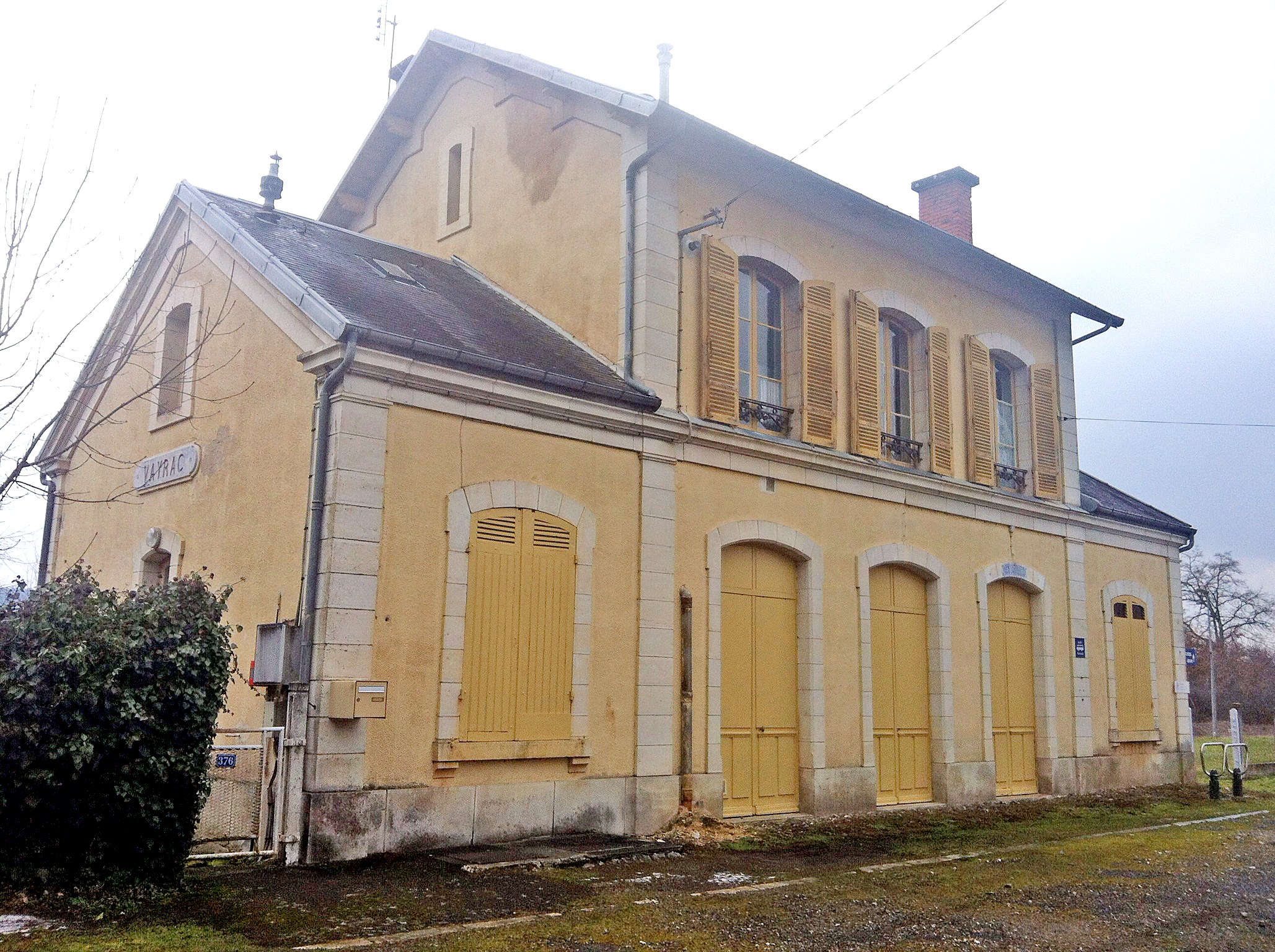
- Former passenger building

General information
- Location: Avenue de la Gare; 46110 Vayrac; Lot; France
- Coordinates: 44.950155°N 1.706398°E
- Owner: SNCF
- Operator: closed
- Line: Souillac à Viescamp-sous-Jallès
- Platforms: 1
- Tracks: 1

Other information
- Station code: 87594739

History
- Opened: 11 May 1891
- Closed: 2017
Location

Vayrac station (French: Gare de Vayrac) is a French closed train station on the ligne de Souillac à Viescamp-sous-Jallès, close to town in the Commune of Vayrac, in the departement of Lot, in the region of Occitanie.

It was in service from 1891, for the Compagnie du chemin de fer de Paris à Orléans (PO).

It took passengers from SNCF, served until 2017 by trains of the TER Occitanie network.

== Railway ==
Built at 122 metres (400 ft) above sea level, the Gare de Vayrac is located at kilometric point (PK) 641,483 of the ligne de Souillac à Viescamp-sous-Jallès, between the open station of Saint-Denis-près-Martel and the closed station at Bétaille.

== History ==
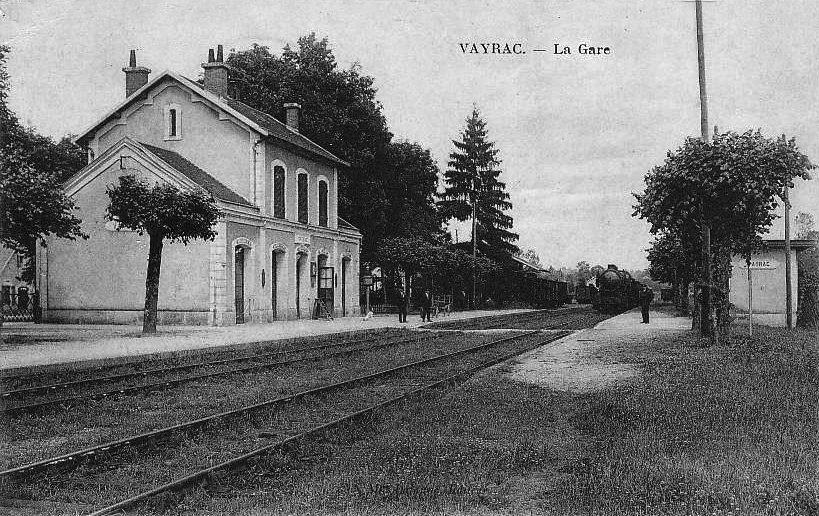
The station in the 1900s.

The Gare de Vayrac was opened on 11 May 1891 by the Compagnie du chemin de fer de Paris à Orléans (PO), used as a stop between the Saint-Denis-près-Martel and Viescamp-sous-Jallès.

The station has a passenger building, with a central body with three openings, with a floor under a roof with two sides, framed by two small wings to an opening on the ground floor under a roof with two sides.

In 1896, the Compagnie du PO indicated that receipts for the station for the year totalled 134,184 francs.

Having once been used as a stop by the SNCF, the passenger building is now closed.

Since July 2017, no trains have stopped at the station.

== Railway history ==
The former passenger buildings are still present at the site.

== See also ==
=== Linked articles ===
- List of SNCF stations in Occitanie
- Ligne de Souillac à Viescamp-sous-Jallès
