= Le Vignon-en-Quercy =

- Commune
- Location of Le Vignon-en-Quercy
- Location within France Location within Occitanie
- Coordinates: 44°59′53″N 1°38′46″E
- Country: France
- Region: Occitania
- Department: Lot
- Arrondissement: Gourdon
- Canton: Martel
- Intercommunality: Causses et Vallée de la Dordogne

Government
  - Mayor (2020–2026): Marielle Alary
- Area^{1}: 21.82 km^{2} (8.42 sq mi)
- Highest elevation: 313 m (1,027 ft)
- Lowest elevation: 118 m (387 ft)
- Population (2023): 955
  - Density: 43.8/km^{2} (113/sq mi)
- Time zone: UTC+01:00 (CET)
  - Summer (DST): UTC+02:00 (CEST)
- INSEE/Postal code: 46232 /46110
- ^{1} French Land Register data, which excludes lakes, ponds, glaciers > 1 km^{2} (0.386 sq mi or 247 acres) and river estuaries.

Le Vignon-en-Quercy (French pronunciation: [lə viɲɔ̃ ɑ̃ kɛʁsi], lit. "Le-Vignon-in-Quercy") is a commune in the Lot department in Southwestern France. It was established on 1 January 2019 by merger of the former communes of Les Quatre-Routes-du-Lot (the seat) and Cazillac. Les Quatre-Routes station has rail connections to Brive-la-Gaillarde, Aurillac, Figeac and Rodez.

== See also ==
- Communes of the Lot department
