= Saint-Denis-près-Martel station =

Railway station in Saint-Denis-lès-Martel, France

Saint-Denis-près-Martel
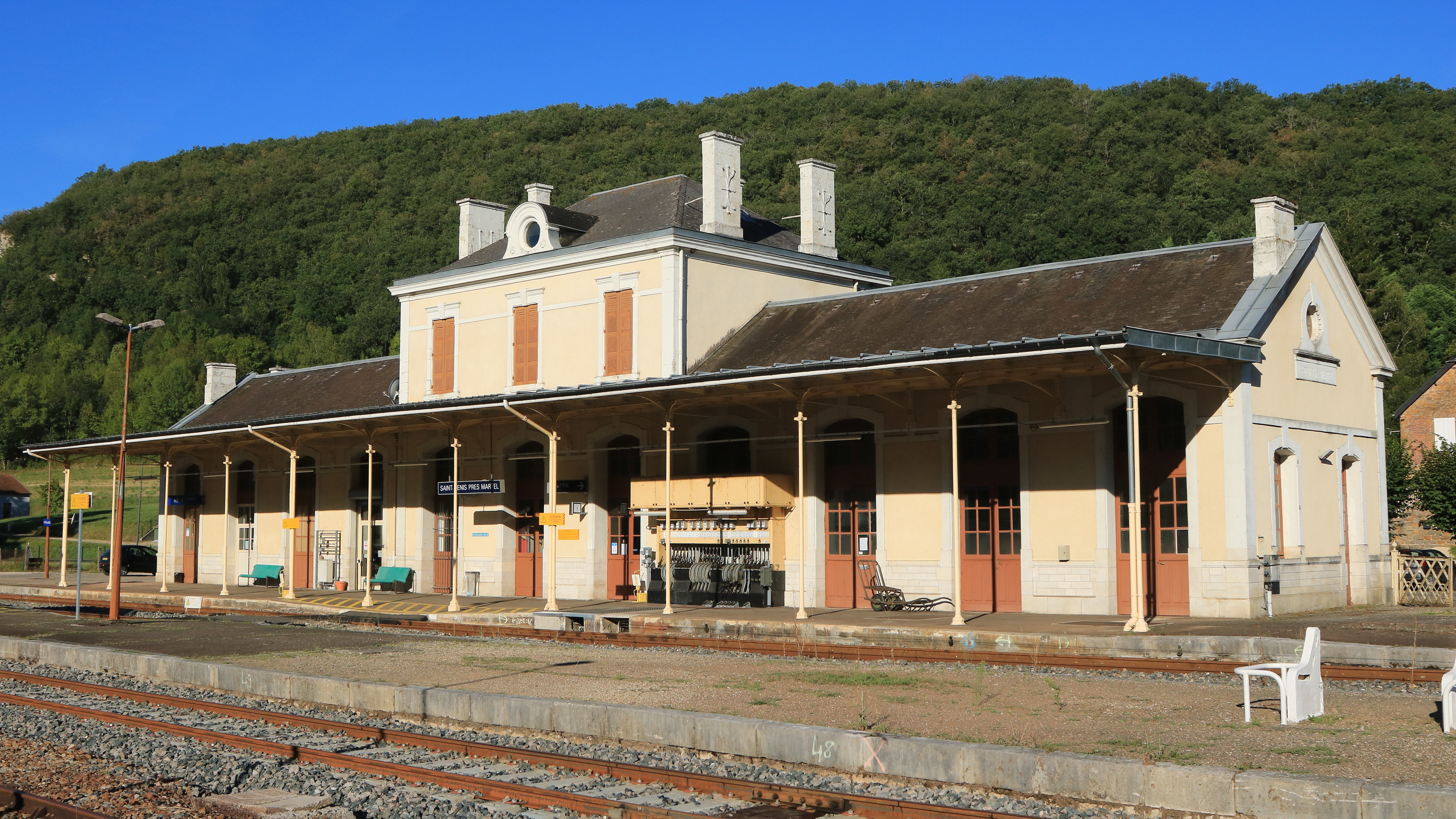
- Saint-Denis-près-Martel station

General information
- Location: Saint-Denis-près-Martel, Lot, Occitania, France
- Coordinates: 44°56′45″N 1°39′59″E
- Line: Brive-Toulouse (via Capdenac)
- Platforms: 3
- Tracks: 5

Other information
- Station code: 87594572

History
- Opened: 10 November 1862; 163 years ago
Services
Preceding station	TER Auvergne-Rhône-Alpes	Following station
Les Quatre-Routes towards Brive-la-Gaillarde	67	Puybrun towards Aurillac
Preceding station	TER Occitanie	Following station
Les Quatre-Routes towards Brive-la-Gaillarde	7	Rocamadour-Padirac towards Rodez
Location

Saint-Denis-près-Martel is a railway station in Saint-Denis-lès-Martel, Occitanie, France. The station is on the Brive–Toulouse (via Capdenac) and Souillac–Viescamp-sous-Jallès railway lines. The station is served by Intercités de nuit (night train) and TER (local) services operated by SNCF.

The station is also on the preserved railway of the Chemin de Fer Touristique du Haut Quercy (CFTHQ), which operates between Martel and Saint-Denis-lès-Martel, a distance of 7 km. They use both steam and diesel trains to operate tourist services along the line.

== History ==
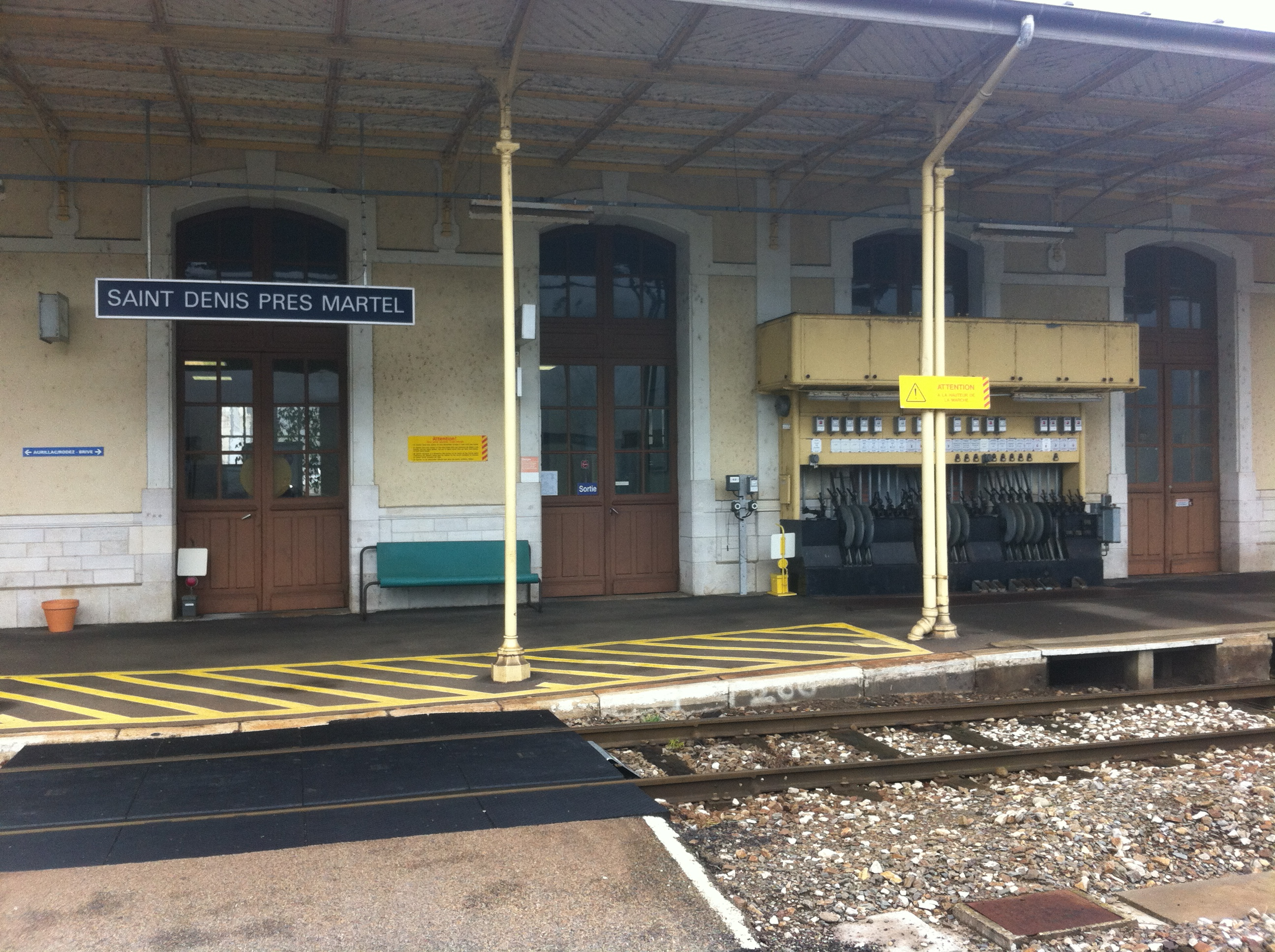
St Denis Pres Martel station building

The Saint-Denis-près-Martel station was put into service on 10 November 1862 by the Compagnie du chemin de fer de Paris à Orléans (PO), when it opened the section from Brive to Capdenac for operation.

It became a bifurcation station on 16 June 1889, when the line to Souillac and Cazoulès was put into service by the Compagnie du PO. On 11 May 1891, the PO Company opened the line from Aurillac to Miécaze and Saint-Denis stations. In 1896, the Compagnie du PO indicated that the station's revenue for the whole year was 105,228 francs.

On 1 June 1980, it lost part of the traffic on its junction line with the closure of the section to Souillac.

== Passenger services ==
=== Station ===
An SNCF train station, it has a passenger building, with a ticket office, open weekdays. A levelled level crossing allows the crossing of the tracks and access to the platforms.

=== Train services ===
The following services currently call at Saint-Denis-près-Martel:

- night services (Intercités de nuit) Paris–Orléans–Figeac–Rodez–Albi
- local service (TER Auvergne-Rhône-Alpes) Brive-la-Gaillarde–Aurillac
- local service (TER Occitanie) Brive-la-Gaillarde–Figeac–Rodez

=== Other services ===
A bicycle park (29 spaces) and a parking lot for vehicles are set up there. It is served by buses and coaches of the departmental lines.

Preceding station	SNCF	Following station
Les Aubrais towards Paris-Austerlitz	Intercités (night)	Rocamadour-Padirac towards Albi-Ville
Preceding station	TER Auvergne-Rhône-Alpes	Following station
Les Quatre Routes towards Brive-la-Gaillarde	67	Puybrun towards Aurillac
Preceding station	TER Occitanie	Following station
Les Quatre Routes towards Brive-la-Gaillarde	7	Rocamadour-Padirac towards Rodez
