= Cazillac =

- Part of Le Vignon-en-Quercy
- Coat of arms
- Location of Cazillac
- Location within France Location within Occitanie
- Coordinates: 44°59′56″N 1°36′43″E
- Country: France
- Region: Occitania
- Department: Lot
- Arrondissement: Gourdon
- Canton: Martel
- Commune: Le Vignon-en-Quercy
- Area^{1}: 19.02 km^{2} (7.34 sq mi)
- Elevation: 136 m (446 ft)
- Highest elevation: 313 m (1,027 ft)
- Lowest elevation: 126 m (413 ft)
- Population (2022): 405
  - Density: 21.3/km^{2} (55.1/sq mi)
- Time zone: UTC+01:00 (CET)
  - Summer (DST): UTC+02:00 (CEST)
- Postal code: 46600
- ^{1} French Land Register data, which excludes lakes, ponds, glaciers > 1 km^{2} (0.386 sq mi or 247 acres) and river estuaries.

Cazillac (French pronunciation: [kazijak]; Languedocien: Casilhac) is a former commune in the Lot department in south-western France. On 1 January 2019, it was merged into the new commune Le Vignon-en-Quercy.

== See also ==
- Communes of the Lot department
