= Viviez =

Commune in Occitanie, France

- Commune
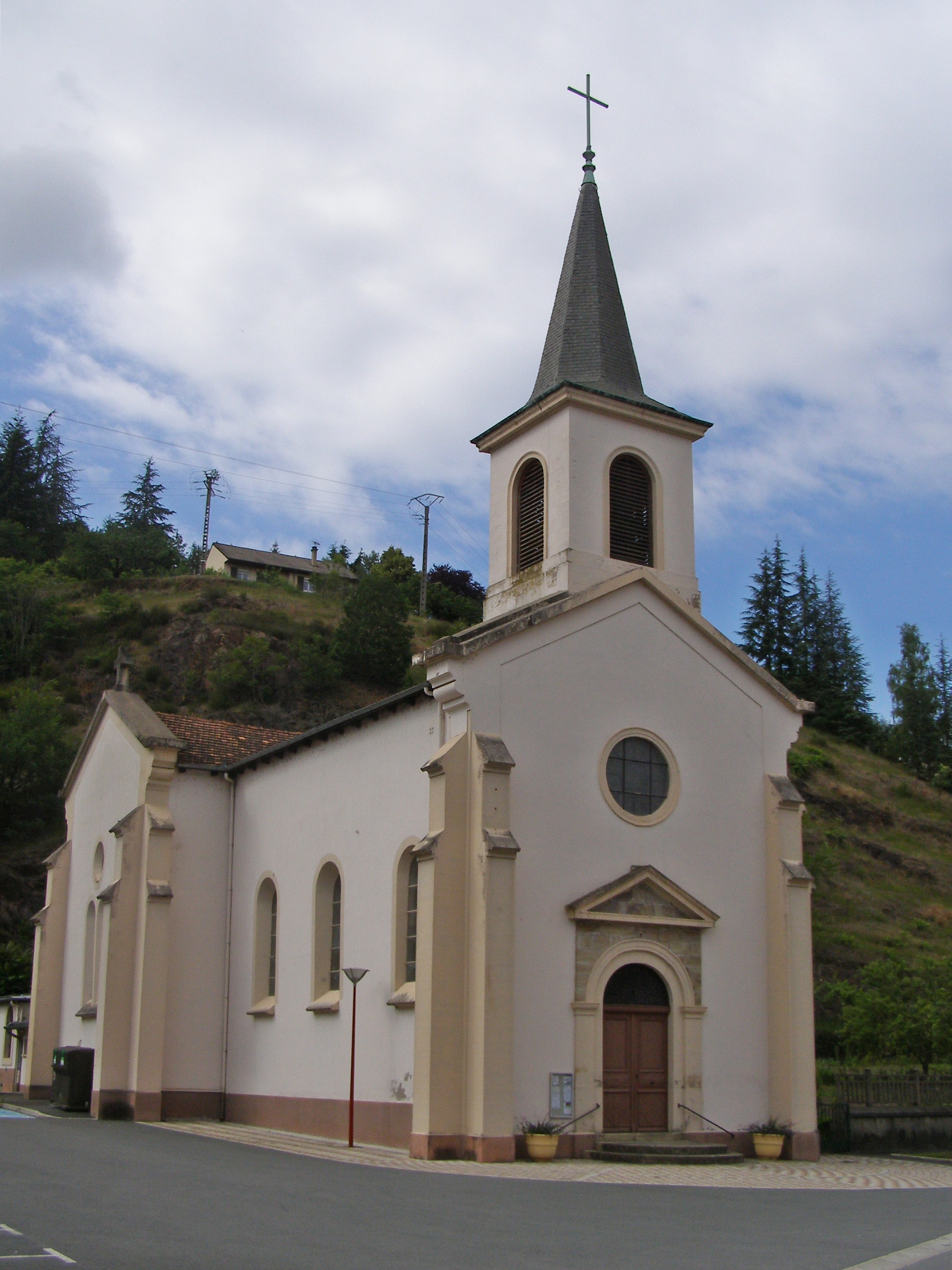
- Church
- Location of Viviez
- Location within France Location within Occitanie
- Coordinates: 44°33′26″N 2°13′00″E
- Country: France
- Region: Occitania
- Department: Aveyron
- Arrondissement: Villefranche-de-Rouergue
- Canton: Lot et Dourdou
- Intercommunality: Decazeville Communauté

Government
  - Mayor (2020–2026): Jean-Louis Denoit
- Area^{1}: 6.53 km^{2} (2.52 sq mi)
- Elevation: 198 m (650 ft)
- Highest elevation: 440 m (1,440 ft)
- Lowest elevation: 178 m (584 ft)
- Population (2023): 1,210
  - Density: 185/km^{2} (480/sq mi)
- Time zone: UTC+01:00 (CET)
  - Summer (DST): UTC+02:00 (CEST)
- INSEE/Postal code: 12305 /12110
- ^{1} French Land Register data, which excludes lakes, ponds, glaciers > 1 km^{2} (0.386 sq mi or 247 acres) and river estuaries.

Viviez (Occitan: Viure) is a commune in the Aveyron department in the Occitanie region in southern France. Viviez-Decazeville station has rail connections to Brive-la-Gaillarde, Figeac and Rodez.

== Population ==
Historical population
| Year | Pop. | ±% p.a. |
|---|---|---|
| 1968 | 2,650 | — |
| 1975 | 2,162 | −2.87% |
| 1982 | 1,889 | −1.91% |
| 1990 | 1,662 | −1.59% |
| 1999 | 1,502 | −1.12% |
| 2007 | 1,403 | −0.85% |
| 2012 | 1,345 | −0.84% |
| 2017 | 1,274 | −1.08% |
| 2023 | 1,210 | −0.86% |
Source: INSEE

== See also ==
- Communes of the Aveyron department
