= Les Quatre-Routes-du-Lot =

- Part of Le Vignon-en-Quercy
- Coat of arms
- Location of Les Quatre-Routes-du-Lot
- Location within France Location within Occitanie
- Coordinates: 44°59′53″N 1°38′46″E
- Country: France
- Region: Occitania
- Department: Lot
- Arrondissement: Gourdon
- Canton: Martel
- Commune: Le Vignon-en-Quercy
- Area^{1}: 2.80 km^{2} (1.08 sq mi)
- Elevation: 127 m (417 ft)
- Highest elevation: 209 m (686 ft)
- Lowest elevation: 118 m (387 ft)
- Population (2022): 550
  - Density: 200/km^{2} (510/sq mi)
- Demonym(s): Quatre-Routois, Quatre-Routoise
- Time zone: UTC+01:00 (CET)
  - Summer (DST): UTC+02:00 (CEST)
- Postal code: 46110
- ^{1} French Land Register data, which excludes lakes, ponds, glaciers > 1 km^{2} (0.386 sq mi or 247 acres) and river estuaries.

Les Quatre-Routes-du-Lot (Languedocien: Las Quatre Rotas, before 1995: Les Quatre-Routes) is a former commune in the Lot department in south-western France. On 1 January 2019, it was merged into the new commune Le Vignon-en-Quercy.

== See also ==
- Communes of the Lot department
