= Brive-la-Gaillarde–Toulouse (via Capdenac) railway =

Coordinates: 44.3555°N 2.0496°E

Brive-la-Gaillarde–Toulouse (via Capdenac)
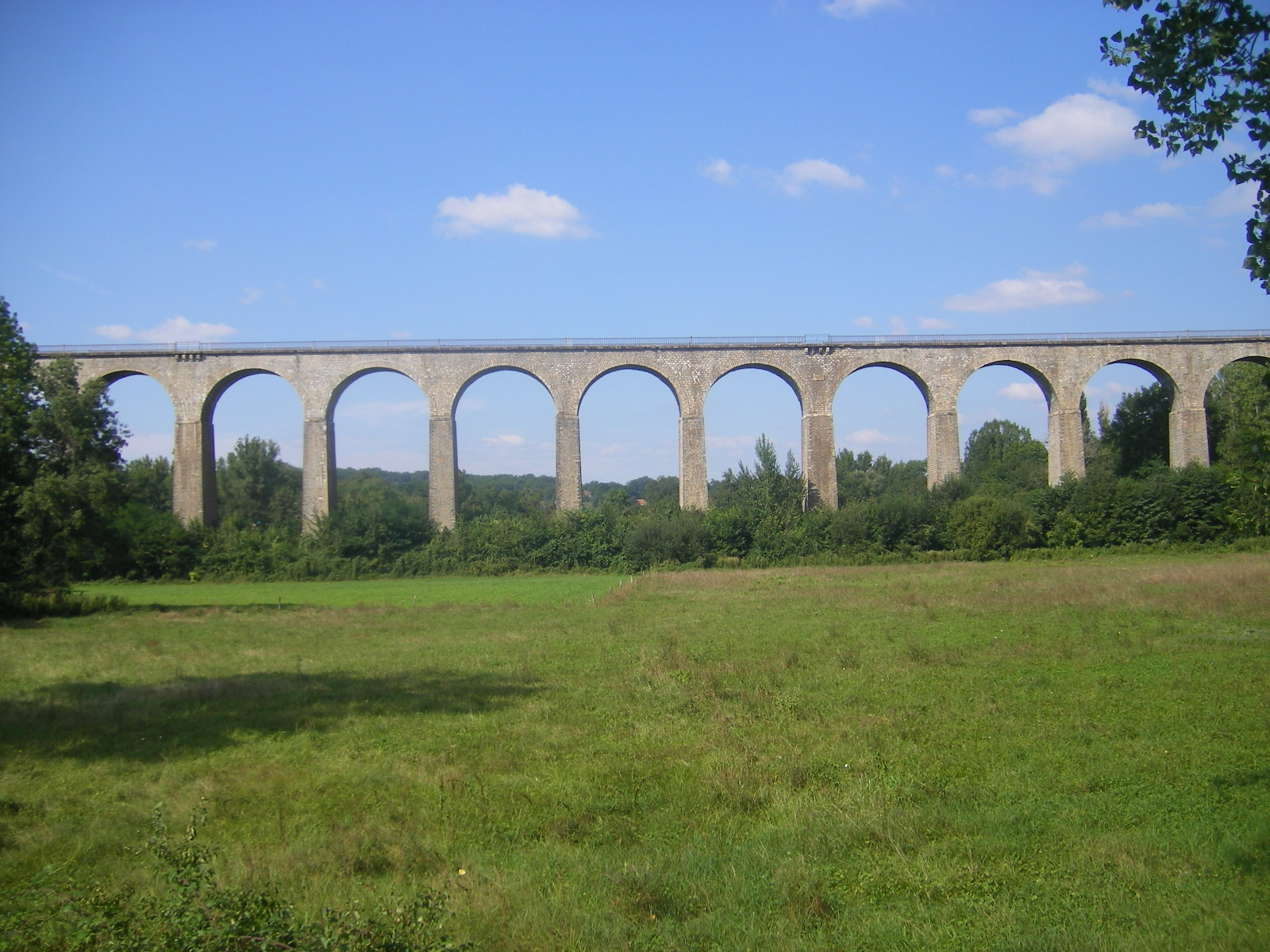
- Brive-la-Gaillarde–Toulouse (via Capdenac) railway

Overview
- Status: Operational
- Owner: RFF
- Locale: France (Nouvelle-Aquitaine, Occitanie)
- Termini: Brive-la-Gaillarde station; Toulouse-Matabiau station
- Stations: 25

Service
- System: SNCF
- Operator(s): SNCF

History
- Opened: 1858-1864

Technical
- Line length: 248 km (154 mi)
- Number of tracks: Single track
- Track gauge: 1,435 mm (4 ft 8 1/2 in) standard gauge
- Electrification: Not electrified

The Brive-la-Gaillarde - Toulouse (via Capdenac) railway is a 248-kilometre French railway line that connects the rural areas between Brive-la-Gaillarde and the large southern city of Toulouse via Figeac and Capdenac. The railway was opened in several stages between 1858 and 1864.

== Route ==
The Brive-la-Gaillarde–Toulouse railway leaves the Brive-la-Gaillarde station in a southeastern direction, towards Saint-Denis-près-Martel station. Here, the line to Aurillac station leaves in an easterly direction and the preserved line to Martel in a westerly direction. The line soon crosses the River Dordogne and follows the valley for a short while before it opens out into flat land. The Figeac station is on two curves, where the line from Aurillac station joins. Shortly after leaving Figeac the railway travels through a 1.3 km tunnel and then travels alongside the River Lot and the preserved railway from Cahors joins; but this line has been disused since 2003. At Capdenac station the line to Rodez station leaves in an easterly direction. The line continues south from here, where after 95 km the line from Albi station and Rodez station join at Tessonnières station, although most interchanges are made at Gaillac station. From here the line twists and turns around the River Tarn until Saint-Sulpice-sur-Tarn station where the river heads northwest. At Saint-Sulpice the line from Castres station joins and the former line to Montauban leaves. The line continues a further 30 km before arriving at its southern terminus of Toulouse-Matabiau station.

=== Main stations ===
The main stations on the Brive - Toulouse railway are:

- Brive-la-Gaillarde station
- Figeac station
- Capdenac station
- Gaillac station
- Saint-Sulpice-sur-Tarn station
- Toulouse-Matabiau station

== History ==
The first section that was opened in 1858 led from Lexos to Capdenac. Capdenac and Brive-la-Gaillarde were connected in 1862. Finally, the line was extended from Lexos to Toulouse in 1864.

Before the opening of this line in 1864, trains between Paris and Toulouse would travel via Tours and Bordeaux. The line remained the main link between Paris and Toulouse until 1891 when the Brive–Cahors section of the Orléans–Montauban railway was opened.

In 2010 a complete renewal of all the ballast between Capdenac and Tessonnières (95 km) took place.

=== Accident ===
On 3 August 1985 at 3:48 p.m., at the height of Flaujac-Gare, there was a serious train accident involving a Corail intercity train towards Assier and a train towards Gramat.

== Services ==
The Brive–Toulouse railway is used by the following passenger services:

- Intercités de nuit night trains from Paris to Albi on the section between Brive and Capdenac
- TER Auvergne-Rhône-Alpes, TER Nouvelle-Aquitaine and TER Occitanie regional services on the whole line
