= Aurillac station =

Railway station in Aurillac, France

Aurillac
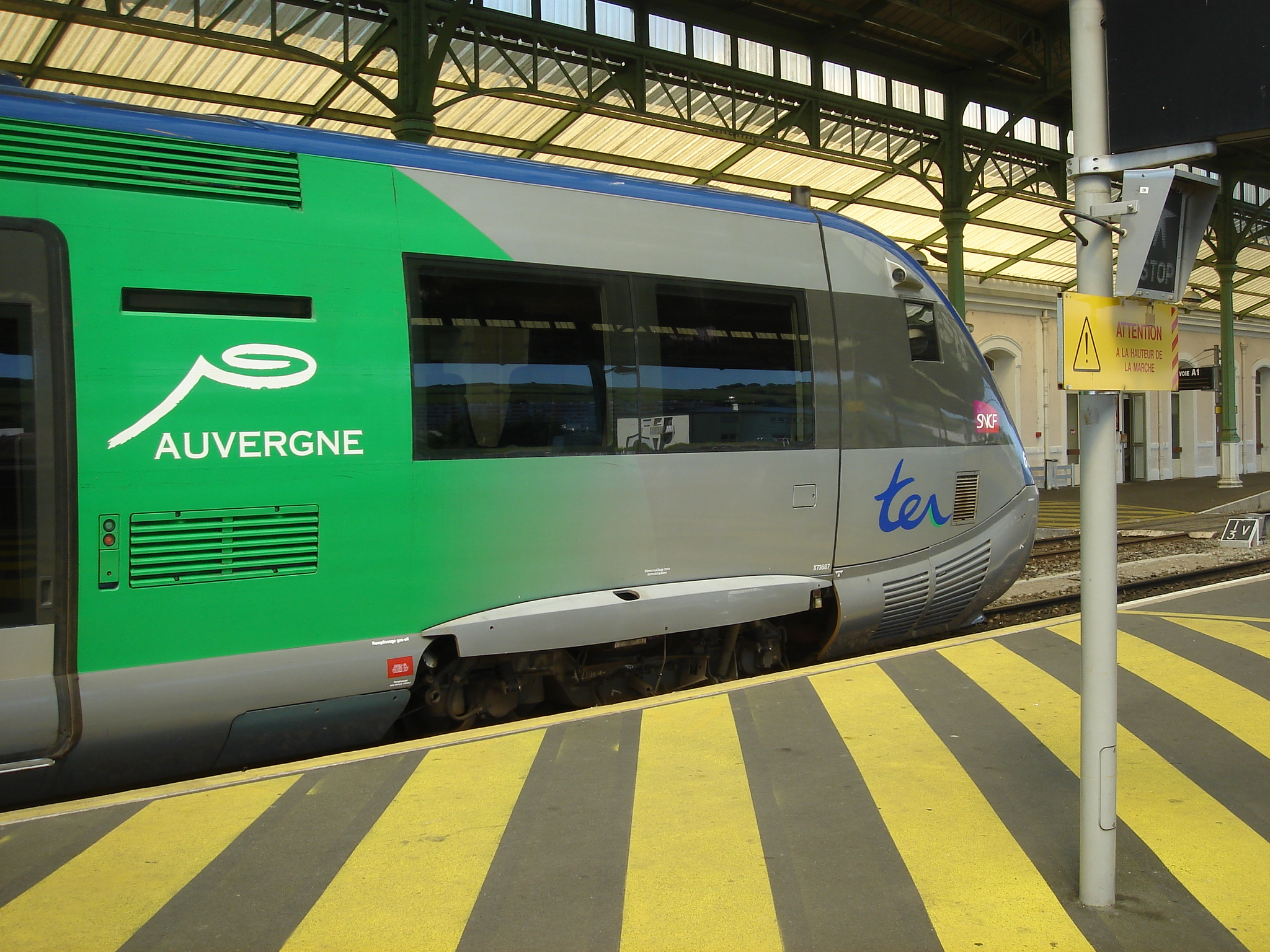
- A TER service at Aurillac railway station

General information
- Location: Place Pierre-Semard; 15000 Aurillac; Cantal; France
- Coordinates: 44.9211°N 2.4358°E
- Elevation: 632 m (2,073 ft)
- Owner: SNCF
- Operator: SNCF
- Line: Figeac–Arvant

Services
| Preceding station | TER Auvergne-Rhône-Alpes | Following station |
|---|---|---|
| Vic-sur-Cère towards Clermont-Ferrand | 65 | Terminus |
| Laroquebrou towards Brive-la-Gaillarde | 67 | Terminus |
| Preceding station | TER Occitanie | Following station |
| Ytrac towards Toulouse | 3 | Terminus |
Location

Aurillac station (French: Gare d'Aurillac) is a French railway station in Aurillac, Auvergne-Rhône-Alpes, France. Located on the Figeac–Arvant railway line, the station is served by TER (local) services operated by the SNCF.

== Train services ==
The following services call at Aurillac as of 2022:

- local service (TER Auvergne-Rhône-Alpes) Clermont-Ferrand - Issoire - Neussargues - Aurillac
- local service (TER Auvergne-Rhône-Alpes) Brive-la-Gaillarde - Aurillac
- local service (TER Occitanie) Toulouse - Figeac - Aurillac

== See also ==
- List of SNCF stations in Auvergne-Rhône-Alpes
