= Albi-Ville station =

Railway station in Albi, France

Coordinates: 43°55′21″N 2°8′15″E

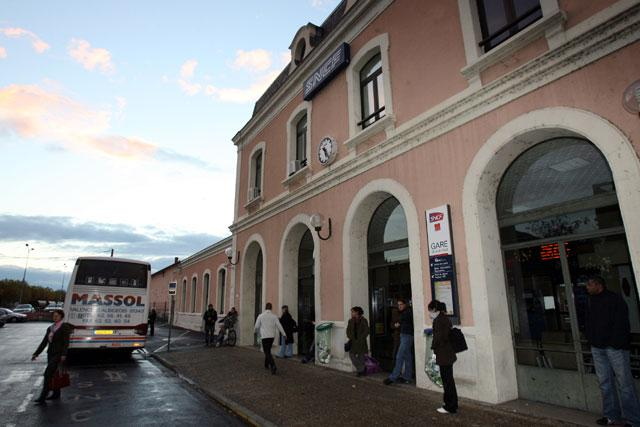
Gare d'Albi-Ville

Albi-Ville is a railway station in Albi, Occitanie, which is the southernmost administrative region of France. The station is located on the Toulouse–Rodez railway line.

== Train services ==
The following services currently call at Albi-Ville:

- night services (Intercités de nuit) Paris–Orléans–Figeac–Rodez–Albi
- local service (TER Occitanie) Toulouse–Albi–Rodez

Preceding station	SNCF	Following station
Albi-Madeleine towards Paris-Austerlitz	Intercités (night)	Terminus
Preceding station	TER Occitanie	Following station
Marssac-sur-Tarn towards Toulouse	2	Albi-Madeleine towards Rodez
