= Rodez station =

Railway station in Rodez, France

Rodez
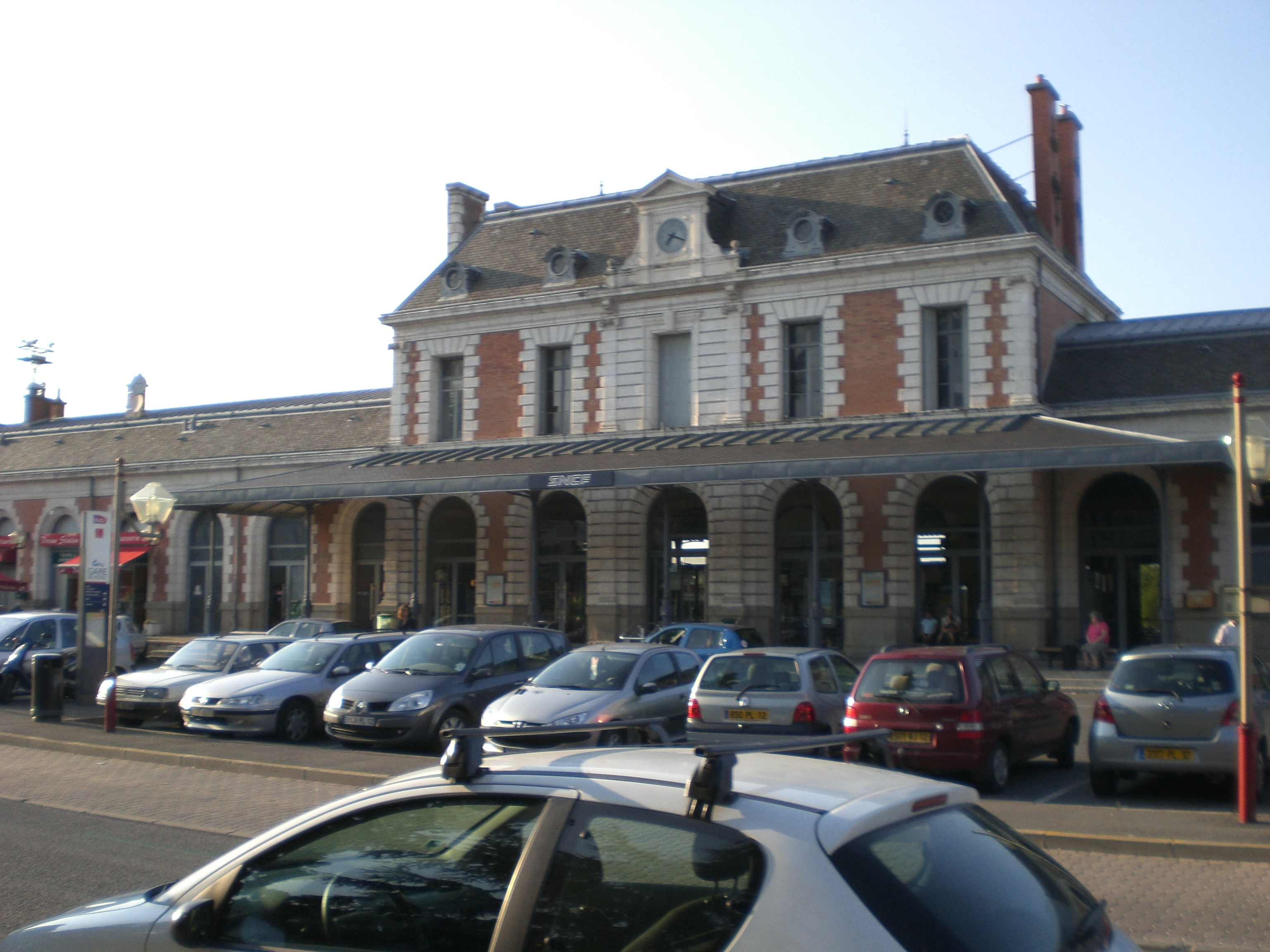
- The passenger building and station entrance

General information
- Location: Avenue du Maréchal-Joffre, 12000; Rodez; France
- Coordinates: 44.3627°N 2.5807°E
- Elevation: 540 m (1,770 ft)
- Owner: RFF
- Operator: SNCF
- Lines: Capdenac–Rodez; Castelnaudary–Rodez; Sévérac-le-Château–Rodez

Other information
- Station code: 87613422

History
- Opened: 5 November 1865; 160 years ago

Services
Preceding station	SNCF	Following station
Saint-Christophe towards Paris-Austerlitz	Intercités (night)	Carmaux towards Albi-Ville
Preceding station	TER Occitanie	Following station
Luc-Primaube towards Toulouse	2	Terminus
Saint-Christophe towards Brive-la-Gaillarde	7	Terminus
Location

The gare de Rodez is a railway station in Rodez, Occitanie, France. The station is on the Capdenac–Rodez, Castelnaudary–Rodez and Sévérac-le-Château–Rodez lines. The station is served by Intercités de nuit (night train) and TER (local) services operated by SNCF.

== Train services ==
The following services currently call at Rodez:

- night services (Intercités de nuit) Paris–Orléans–Figeac–Rodez–Albi
- local service (TER Occitanie) Toulouse–Albi–Rodez
- local service (TER Occitanie) Brive-la-Gaillarde–Figeac–Rodez

Train services between Rodez and Millau were suspended in 2017, and are expected to resume in 2026. As a replacement, TER Occitanie bus services to Millau are offered.
