= Sauto =

Sauto may refer to:

== People ==
- Agustín Sauto Arana (1908–1986), Spanish football player
- Jiowana Sauto (born 1998), Fijian rugby sevens player
- José Ramón Sauto Hurtado (1912–1994), Mexican football player

== Places ==
- Sauto, Pyrénées-Orientales, France
