= Sauto station =

Railway station in Sauto, France

Sauto
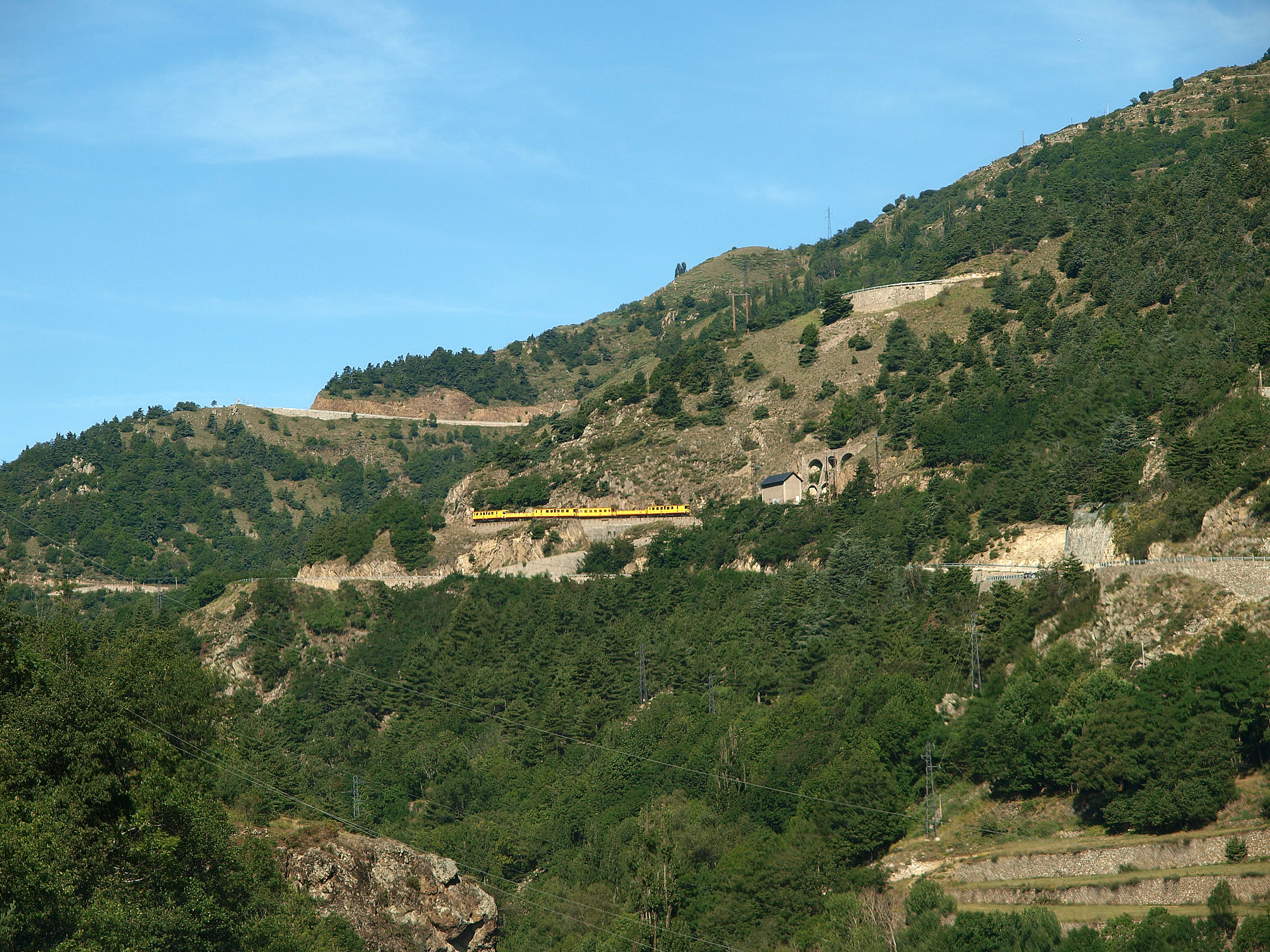
- Sauto station can be seen in the middle of the picture

General information
- Location: Sauto, Occitanie, France
- Coordinates: 42.50637°N 2.15999°E
- Line: Ligne de Cerdagne

Other information
- Station code: 87784777

History
- Opened: 1910

Services
Preceding station	TER Occitanie	Following station
Planès towards Latour-de-Carol	32 (Ligne de Cerdagne)	Fontpédrouse-Saint-Thomas-les-Bains towards Villefranche–Vernet-les-Bains
Location

Sauto halt (French: Halte de Sauto) is a railway station in Sauto, Occitanie, southern France. Within TER Occitanie, it is part of line 32 (Latour-de-Carol-Enveitg–Villefranche-Vernet-les-Bains, Train Jaune).
