= Planès =

- Commune
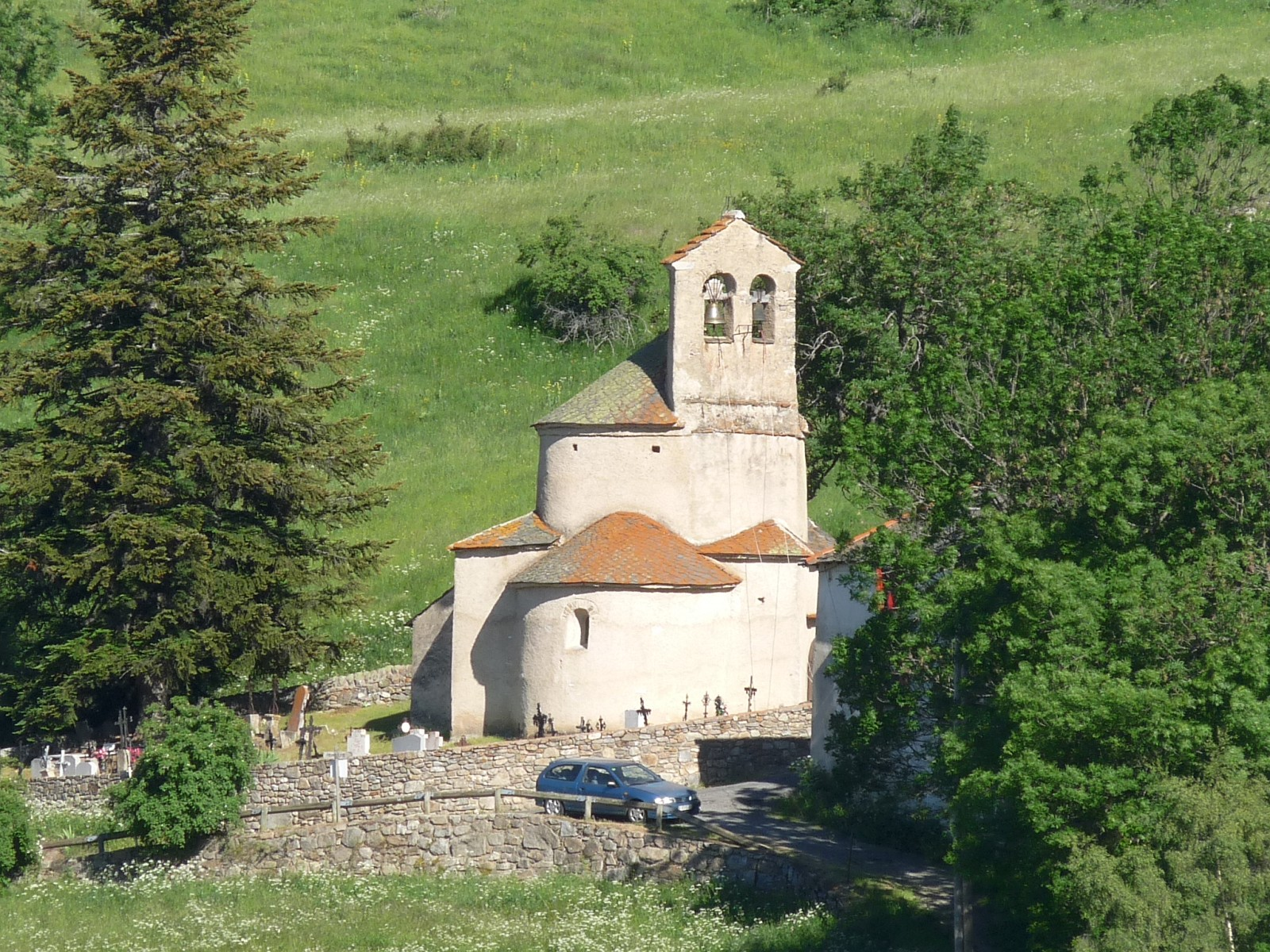
- The church in Planès
- Location of Planès
- Location within France Location within Occitanie
- Coordinates: 42°29′35″N 2°08′25″E
- Country: France
- Region: Occitania
- Department: Pyrénées-Orientales
- Arrondissement: Prades
- Canton: Les Pyrénées catalanes

Government
  - Mayor (2020–2026): Pierre Riu
- Area^{1}: 14.24 km^{2} (5.50 sq mi)
- Elevation: 1,550 m (5,090 ft)
- Highest elevation: 2,804 m (9,199 ft)
- Lowest elevation: 1,218 m (3,996 ft)
- Population (2023): 57
  - Density: 4.0/km^{2} (10/sq mi)
- Time zone: UTC+01:00 (CET)
  - Summer (DST): UTC+02:00 (CEST)
- INSEE/Postal code: 66142 /66210
- ^{1} French Land Register data, which excludes lakes, ponds, glaciers > 1 km^{2} (0.386 sq mi or 247 acres) and river estuaries.

Planès (French pronunciation: [planɛs]) is a commune in the Pyrénées-Orientales department in southern France.

== Geography ==
Planès is located in the canton of Les Pyrénées catalanes and in the arrondissement of Prades. Planès station has rail connections to Villefranche-de-Conflent and Latour-de-Carol.

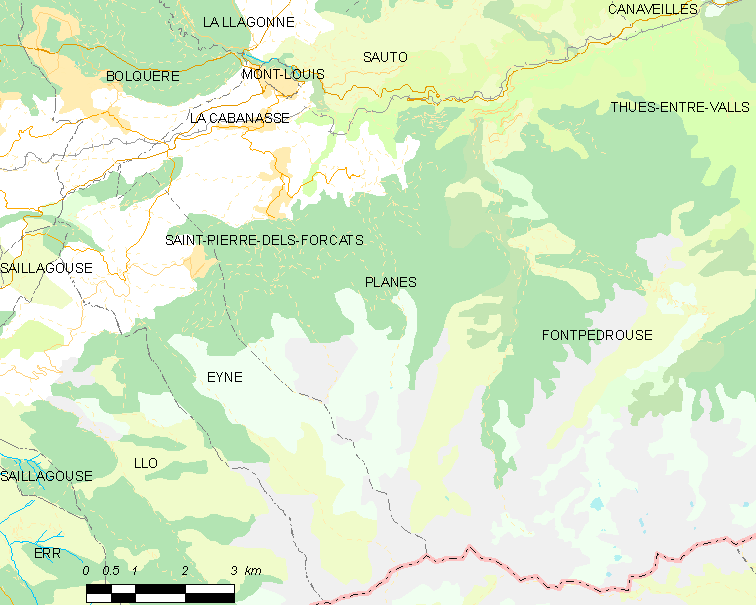
Map of Planès and its surrounding communes

== Population ==
Historical population
Year	Pop.	±% p.a.
1968	31	—
1975	29	−0.95%
1982	42	+5.43%
1990	33	−2.97%
1999	27	−2.21%
2007	47	+7.17%
2012	52	+2.04%
2017	53	+0.38%
2023	57	+1.22%
Source: INSEE

== See also ==
- Communes of the Pyrénées-Orientales department
