= Planès station =

Railway station in Planès, France

Planès
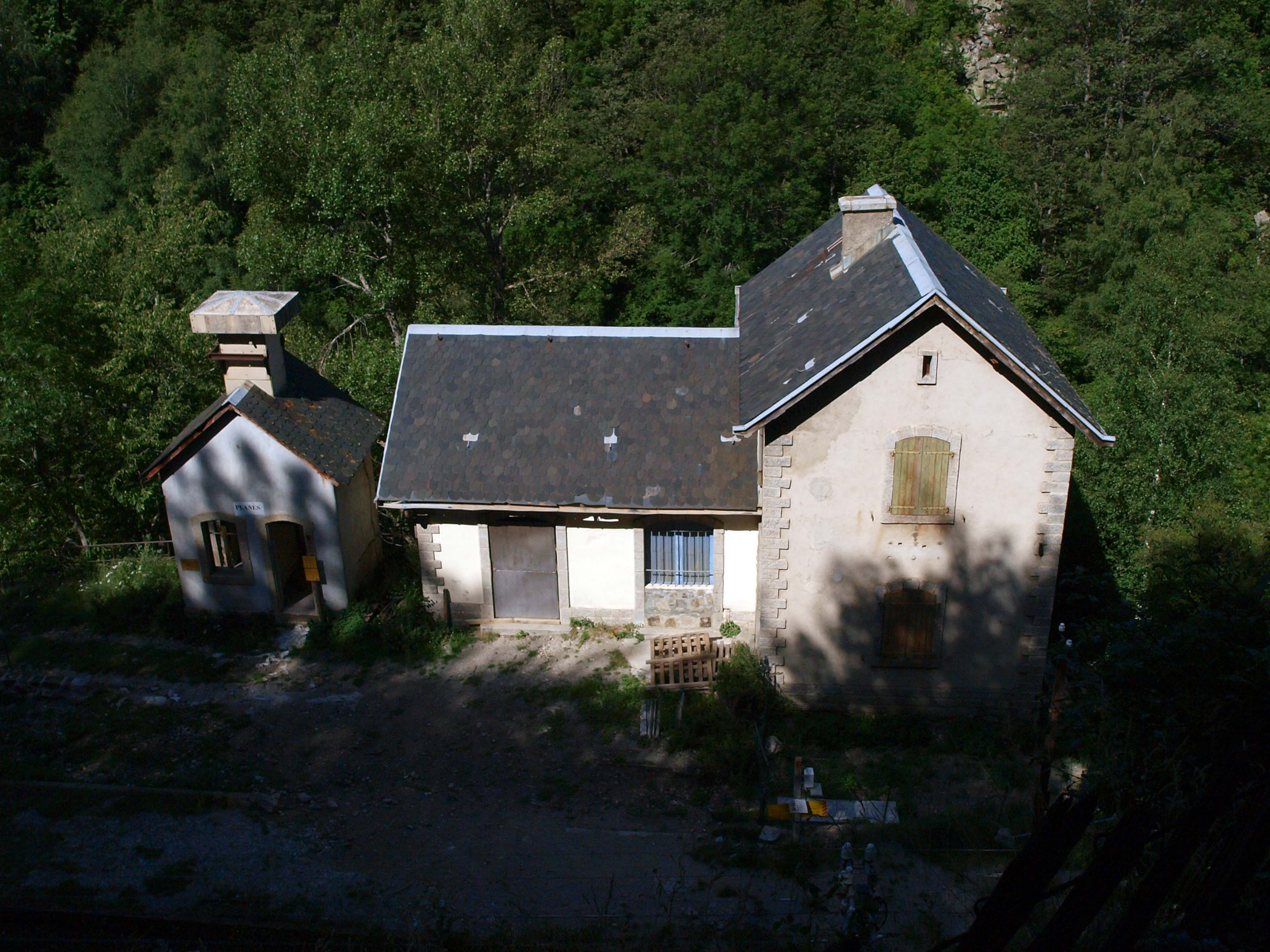
- Planès station building

General information
- Location: Planès, Occitanie, France
- Coordinates: 42.50093°N 2.13686°E
- Line: Ligne de Cerdagne

Other information
- Station code: 87784785

Services
Preceding station	TER Occitanie	Following station
Mont-Louis-La Cabanasse towards Latour-de-Carol	32 (Ligne de Cerdagne)	Sauto towards Villefranche–Vernet-les-Bains
Location

Planès is a railway station in Planès, Occitanie, southern France. Within TER Occitanie, it is part of line 32 (Latour-de-Carol-Enveitg–Villefranche-Vernet-les-Bains, Train Jaune).
