= Sauto, Pyrénées-Orientales =

Sauto Sautó i Fetges (Catalan)
- Commune
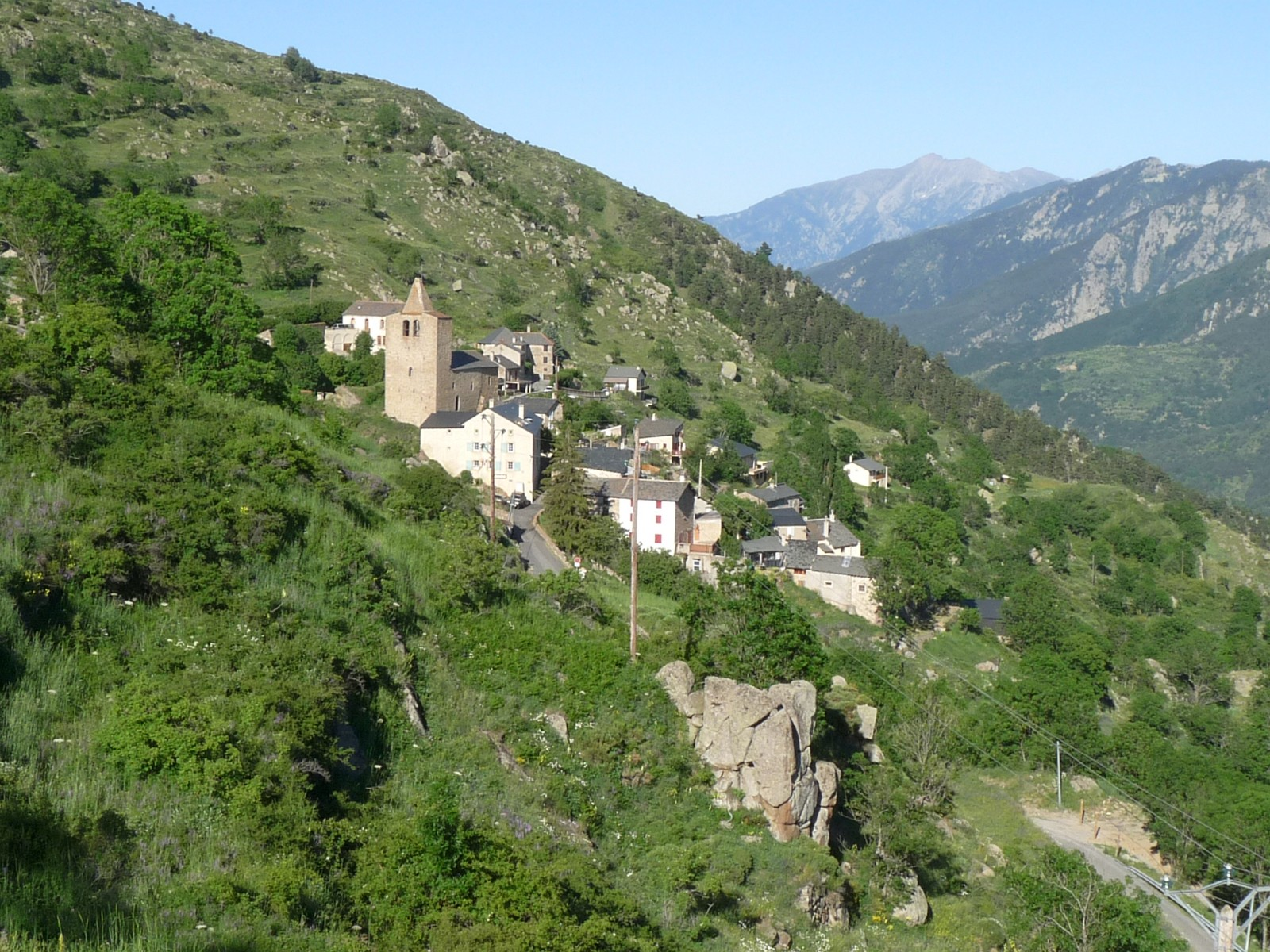
- A general view of Sauto

- Coat of arms
- Location of Sauto
- Location within France Location within Occitanie
- Coordinates: 42°30′48″N 2°09′07″E
- Country: France
- Region: Occitania
- Department: Pyrénées-Orientales
- Arrondissement: Prades
- Canton: Les Pyrénées catalanes

Government
  - Mayor (2020–2026): Michel Santanach
- Area^{1}: 8.43 km^{2} (3.25 sq mi)
- Elevation: 1,600 m (5,200 ft)
- Highest elevation: 2,030 m (6,660 ft)
- Lowest elevation: 1,100 m (3,600 ft)
- Population (2023): 102
  - Density: 12.1/km^{2} (31.3/sq mi)
- Time zone: UTC+01:00 (CET)
  - Summer (DST): UTC+02:00 (CEST)
- INSEE/Postal code: 66192 /66210
- ^{1} French Land Register data, which excludes lakes, ponds, glaciers > 1 km^{2} (0.386 sq mi or 247 acres) and river estuaries.

Sauto (French pronunciation: [soto]; Catalan: Sautó i Fetges) is a commune in the Pyrénées-Orientales department in southern France. It is reached by the TER Occitanie, which serves the station of Gare de Sauto.

== Geography ==
Sauto is located in the canton of Les Pyrénées catalanes and in the arrondissement of Prades.

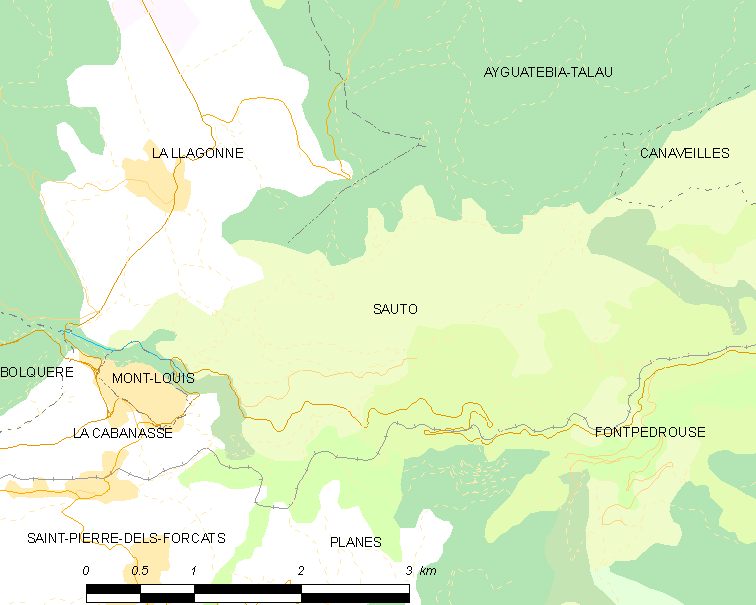
Map of Sauto and its surrounding communes

== Population ==
Historical population
Year	Pop.	±% p.a.
1968	121	—
1975	98	−2.97%
1982	93	−0.75%
1990	102	+1.16%
1999	107	+0.53%
2007	82	−3.27%
2012	95	+2.99%
2017	91	−0.86%
2023	102	+1.92%
Source: INSEE

The inhabitants of the commune are known as Sautonins or Saltunats.

== See also ==
- Communes of the Pyrénées-Orientales department
