= Jacques Lacassin =

French architect (1847–1926)

- Born: 6 September 1847; Toulouse, France
- Died: April 1926; Toulouse, France
- Occupation: Architect

Jacques Louis Marie Lacassin (6 September 1847 – April 1926) was a French architect. He was second at the Prix de Rome in 1872 and inspector of diocesan works in Haute-Garonne.

== Biography ==
Lacassin was the son of Marie Mondous and Louis Lacassin, Ébéniste.

Jacques Lacassin joined the École des Beaux-Arts de Toulouse and won the Grand Prix Municipal d'Architecture in 1868. Subsequently, the latter joined the Beaux-Arts de Paris and was a student of the architect Louis-Jules André, himself a former student of Henri Labrouste. Jacques Lacassin studied there alongside Victor Laloux. He entered second class at the end of 1869 and remained there until 1872, after his studies were temporarily put on hold by the war. He was a steward at the Grand Prix de Rome in 1872 where he finished second.

In 1873, the latter returned to Toulouse, settled at 5 rue Peyras and began practicing as an architect. He carried out his first project for a “courtyard” house and villa on rue d'Alsace-Lorraine for Mister Arzac. Subsequently, until 1894, he created a large number of houses and buildings. In September 1894, he participated in the project to extend rue de Metz, in association with Bernard Deffès, where he built several buildings. He became inspector of diocesan works the same year and remained so until 1920. He also became president of the regional society of architects of the Midi in 1906. He was also a member of the Artistic Union of Toulouse.

=== Personal life ===
Lacassin married Marie Gaillard, who died in Paris on 5 January 1929. Their daughter Elisabeth married the architect Joseph Gilet, born in 1876 and died in 1943. Together, they had a son, Jean-Louis Gilet, also an architect. The latter two joined forces in 1932 and Jean-Louis Gilet subsequently succeeded his father.

== Architecture ==
=== Architectural current ===
Jacques Lacassin was eclectic in the variety of architectural styles used. He had a "regionalist" style during his work for the diocese, through the church of Caubiac, or the church of Mirepoix-sur-Tarn similar to neo-Gothic.

Lacassin's civil public architecture was very sober, with the Vignaux school, perhaps inspired by rationalism.

For private architecture, Lacassin had a pronounced taste for Italian neo-Renaissance, French classicism, neo-mannerism, and even neo-baroque at the end of the century. The sculpted decorations are very ornate, and he used brick-stone polychromy. When commissioning a "hotel", in reality closer to a Haussmannian building, there is no specific stylistic particularity.

=== Architectural achievements (in Toulouse, unless otherwise stated) ===
==== 1874 ====
- the Landou house, rue Saint-Michel;
- the Maybois chalet;
- Funerary monuments.

==== 1875 ====
- the Hôtel Arzac on the corner of rue du Musée (today rue Antoine Mercier) and Alsace-Lorraine;
- the Hôtel Gresse at 21 rue du Taur;
- the Palaminy school house;
- the Sartou house;
- the Mascarin house;
- restored the Armengaud house, rue des Prêtres.

==== 1876 ====
- the Lannes house, rue de la République;
- restored another house Lannes, Allées de Garonne.

==== 1877 ====
- the Rigoni house, boulevard Riquet.

==== 1878 ====
- the Dupac house;
- the Peace store;
- the Desmarais oil warehouse;
- transformed a former convent into a residential house; restored the Poumayrac building.

==== 1879 ====
- the restoration of the Merville church;
- the pavilion for the Chanat exhibition;
- the Desmarais oil warehouse in Narbonne;
- the Gresse country house.

==== 1880 ====
- the Fraisse building, 6 rue Baronie;
- the Deutch oil warehouse.

==== 1881–1882 ====
- the Merville school house;
- the Amiaud house, rue des Couteliers;
- the church of Aureins;
- the Hôtel Ganzy on Boulevard Carnot;
- the Bibent café;
- the Haglois/Grillon building, rue Lafayette;
- Château Laurens in Rouffiac;
- the Lambraie house, rue Raymond-IV;
- the Louis Feuga Hotel;
- the Hôtel Cazaux which would become the Hôtel de la Poste;
- the Daguilhon-Pujol Hotel;
- the Gaillard Hotel;
- the Feuga-Dupuy building, at the corner of rue Alsace-Lorraine and rue de la Poste;
- the Hôtel Bonnet, rue Saint-Étienne;
- the castle of Mme. Rigac;
- the castle of Mr. Garipuy;
- the Haffner Hotel/Brewery;
- the Labit Hotel, rue de Bayard;
- the Hôtel Lacroix, rue de Bayard;
- the castle of Mme. Sabatier, in Sédeilhac;
- the school house of Saint Alban;
- the Vignaux school house;
- the bell tower of Vignaux;
- the presbytery of Rouffiac;
- the Sens hunting meeting, in Puysségur;
- the Fournier house/cafe, in Castres;
- restored the Lannes house;
- restored the Saint-Laure building;
- restored the Château de Seysses;
- restored the church of Rouffiac.

==== 1883 ====
- restored the church of Cornebarrieu;
- the facade of the town hall of Villefranche-de-Lauragais.

==== 1885 ====
- work at the Rouffiac-Tolosan school (completed in 1901).

==== 1889 ====
- the presbytery of Rouffiac;
- the Villefranche-de-Lauragais slaughterhouse.

==== 1894 ====
- expanded the Rouffiac cemetery.

==== 1898 ====
- expanded the Préserville cemetery.

==== 1899 ====
- restored the church of Bourg-Saint-Bernard.

==== 1900 ====
- rebuilt the church of Caubiac.

==== 1902 ====
- restored the church of Rouffiac;
- restored the church of Gaillac-Toulza.

==== 1903 ====
- restored the church of Arbas;
- the bell tower of Vignaux;
- work at the school and town hall of Préserville (completed in 1907).

==== 1904 ====
- the presbytery of Carbonne;
- did work at the Préserville presbytery.

==== 1907 ====
- the church of Mirepoix-sur-Tarn.

== Bibliography ==
- Foucaud, Odile (2000). L'architecture au XIXème siècle à Toulouse (in French). Paris: Somogy.
