= Rue d'Alsace-Lorraine, Toulouse =

Street in Occitania, France

Rue d'Alsace-Lorraine
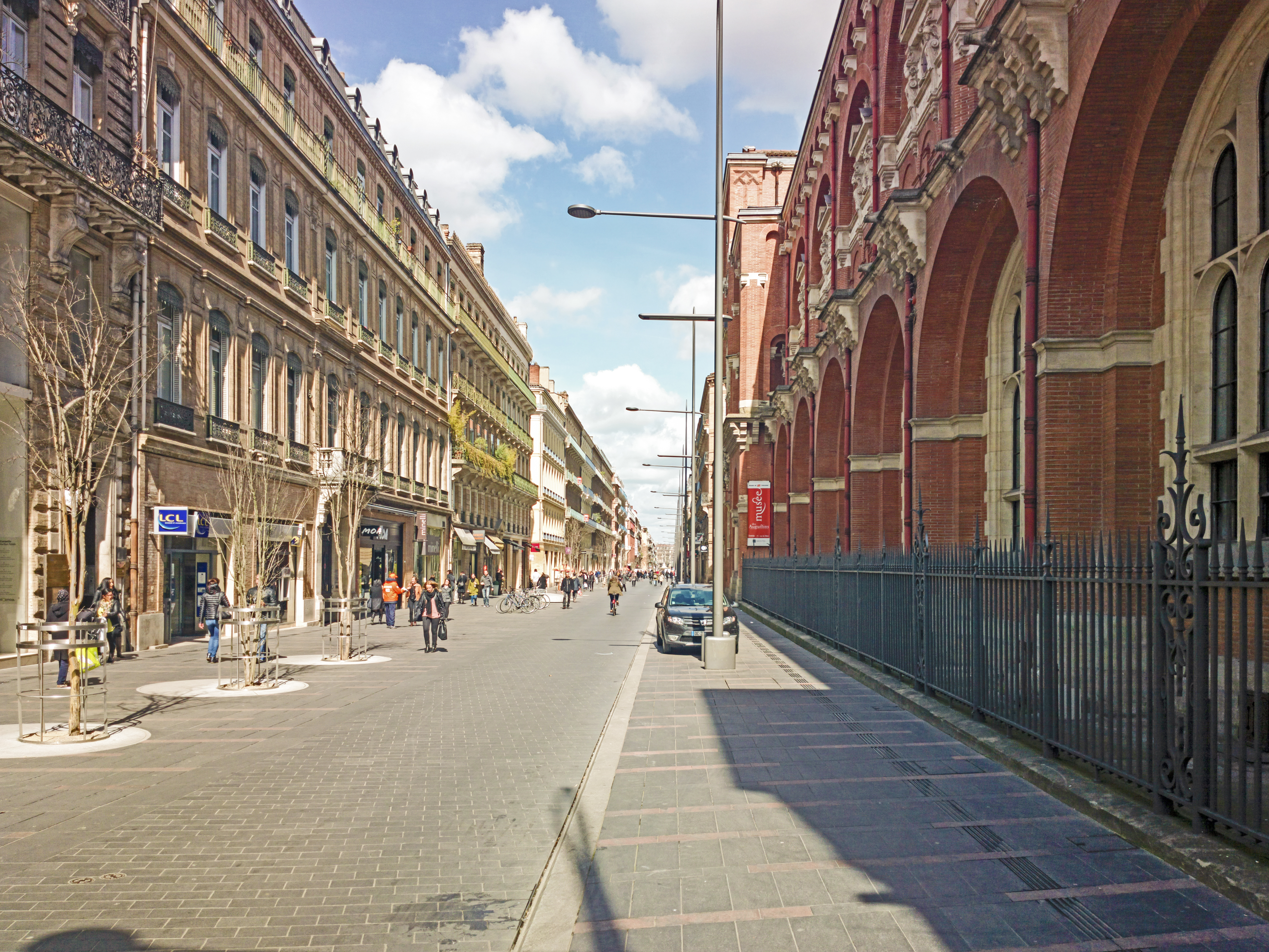
- Rue d'Alsace-Lorraine, seen from the corner of rue de Metz.
- Interactive map of Rue d'Alsace-Lorraine
- Type: Street
- Length: 1,000 m (3,300 ft)
- Location: Toulouse
- Coordinates: 43°36′06″N 1°26′44″E

Rue d'Alsace-Lorraine (French pronunciation: [ʁy dalzas lɔʁɛn]; in Occitan: carrièra d'Alsacia-Lorena) is a road in Toulouse, capital of the Occitania, in the South of France.

It is one of the main routes in Toulouse. Like rue Saint-Rome, it is the city's main shopping street. It is also, with rue de Metz and rue Théodore-Ozenne, one of the main Haussmann arteries of the Ville Rose.

== Location and access ==
=== Description ===
Rue d'Alsace-Lorraine is located on the border between the Capitole and Carmes districts, to the west, and Saint-Étienne and Saint-Georges, to the east, all in sector 1 - Center.

It extends over one kilometer in a straight line facing due north. It arises in the extension of rue du Languedoc at place Rouaix, at the entrance to the Hôtel de Ciron-Fumel. (nearest metro station: Esquirol, line A).

At the height of the Musée des Augustins, it receives on its right side the rue de Metz and borders the east side of the place Esquirol; she then becomes a pedestrian. It gives rise on its right side to rue Antonin-Mercié and receives rue Genty-Magre on the opposite side. It crosses rue du Fourbastard perpendicularly, before receiving rue Baour-Lormian on its left side; it crosses rue de la Pomme before giving birth on the right to rue du Lieutenant-Colonel-Pélissier then to rue Lapeyrouse.

At the level of square Charles-de-Gaulle which it borders on its eastern side, it crosses rue du Poids-de-l'Huile and rue Lafayette (nearest metro station: Capitole, line A).

After receiving rue John-Fitzgerald-Kennedy on its left side it crosses rue Rivals then rue du Salé which is entirely pedestrian. After giving rise to rue de Bayard on its right side, it receives rue Charles-de-Rémusat and becomes accessible to car traffic again. It ends after reaching rue Bellegarde, boulevard de Strasbourg (nearest metro station: Jeanne-d’Arc, line B).

=== Routes encountered ===
Rue d'Alsace-Lorraine meets the following roads, in the order of increasing numbers (« L » indicates that the street is on the left, « R » on the right):

1. Place Rouaix (L)
2. Rue Croix-Baragnon (R)
3. Rue du Sac (L)
4. Place Étienne-Esquirol (L)
5. Rue de Metz (R)
6. Rue Genty-Magre (L)
7. Rue Antonin-Mercié (R)
8. Rue du Fourbastard
9. Rue Baour-Lormian (L)
10. Rue de la Pomme
11. Rue du Lieutenant-Colonel-Pélissier (R)
12. Rue Lapeyrouse (L)
13. Rue du Poids-de-l'Huile
14. Square Charles-de-Gaulle (L)
15. Rue Lafayette
16. Rue John-Fitzgerald-Kennedy (L)
17. Rue Rivals
18. Rue du Salé
19. Rue Charles-de-Rémusat (L)
20. Rue de Bayard (R)
21. Rue Bellegarde (L)
22. Boulevard de Strasbourg
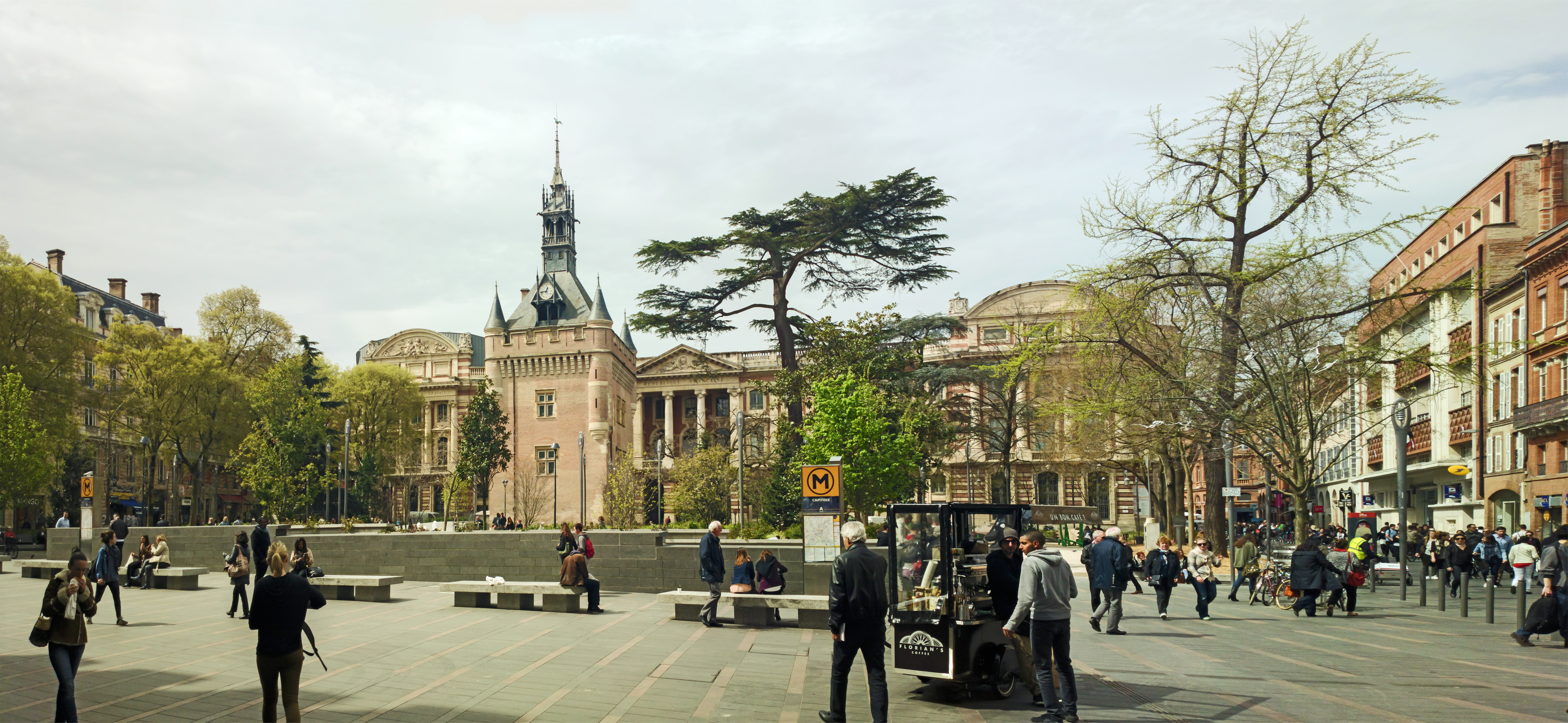
Rue d'Alsace at Square Charles-de-Gaulle and the donjon du Capitole.

== Odonymy ==
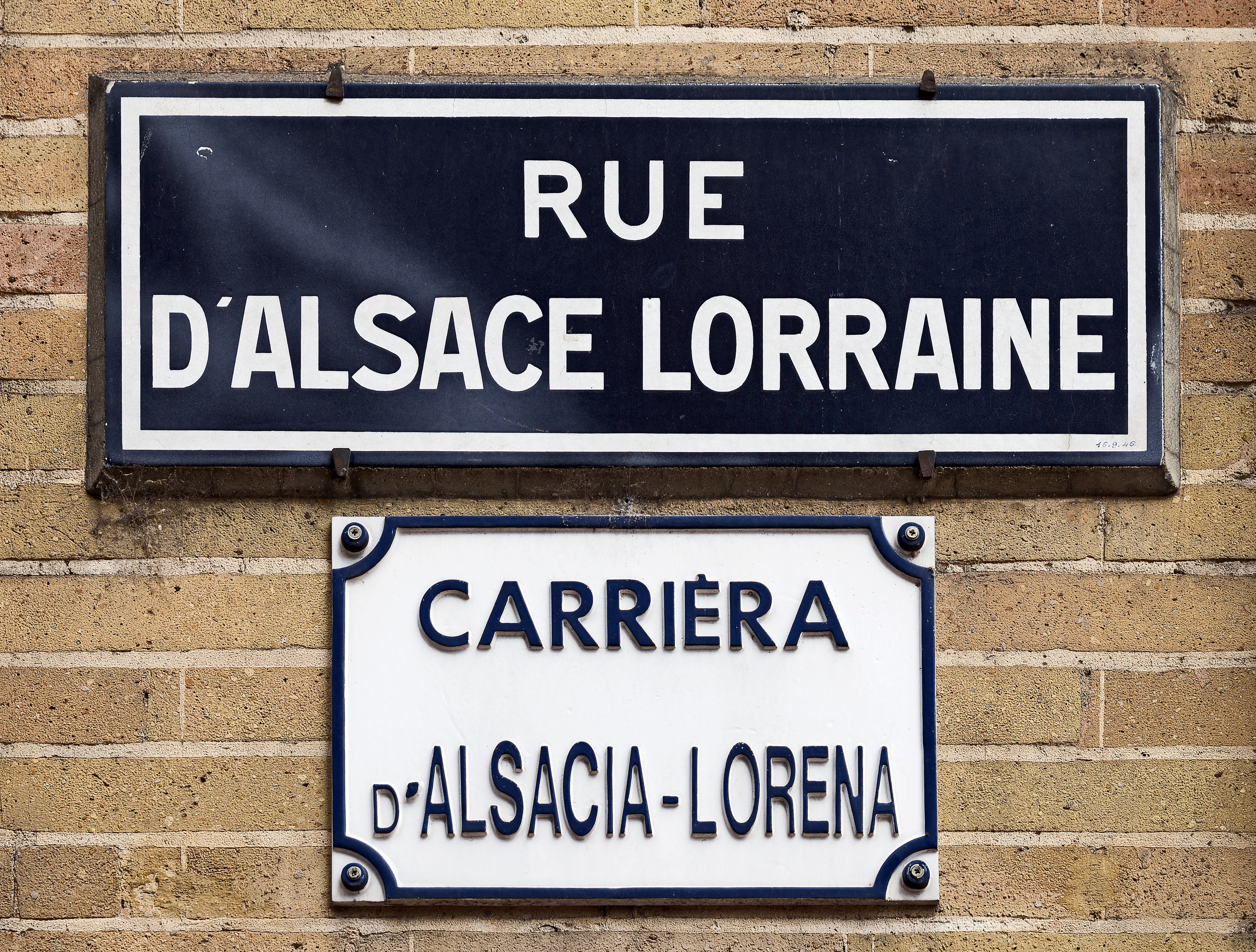
Street name sign in French and in occitan.

In the first development projects of Urbain Maguès, the street is simply designated as Rue Longitudinale – it is the longitudinal breakthrough, with a north–south orientation, as opposed to the Transversal breakthrough, with an east–west orientation (current rue de Metz). But this name was only provisional. On November 26, 1872, the municipal council of Henri Ebelot decided to name it in honor of Alsace-Lorraine, the two provinces lost following the Franco-German War of 1870 and the disastrous Treaty of Frankfurt of 1871.

== History ==
=== Contemporary period ===
Rue d'Alsace-Lorraine was opened between 1869 and 1873, as part of work proposed by Urbain Maguès and approved by the municipal council by one vote.

Under the mandate of Mayor Jean Patras de Campaigno, in 1864, various urban projects were proposed with the aim of restructuring the city center, mainly by creating new traffic routes. On March 24, 1864, the project of the chief engineer of Bridges and Roads, Urbain Maguès, was the last one retained by the Municipal Council. The latter was based on the ideas already proposed by the Capitouls in 1776. It provided for the creation of two large streets 15 meters wide with buildings not exceeding 17.5 meters in height and 8 meters for the extension into the adjacent streets. These two axes were to constitute the new main traffic axes of the city. The first major street, first known as Rue Transversale, would then take the name Rue de Metz. The second street which is perpendicular to it, Rue Longitudinale, will subsequently take the name Rue Alsace-Lorraine on November 26, 1872, by decision of the Municipal Council. This name echoes contemporary events, since it refers to Alsace and Lorraine, two territories which were lost by France in 1871.

The implementation of this project led to numerous expropriations, since it required drilling through the moulons (neighboring houses delimited by street crossings) in the heart of a very dense urban fabric.

As for financing, Mayor Campaigno received help from the Belgian Land Bank which provided the necessary funds.

Despite strong opposition to this project, particularly from the population, the project was still implemented and approved by Imperial decree on June 17, 1868.

The development project began in 1868 with the first land purchases and expropriations. The first houses were built in 1871 on rue Alsace-Lorraine, but it was not until 1878 that the first building on this street was completed. The roadways were completed in 1873.

All these buildings, designed above all for the report, introduced to Toulouse the notion of living in apartments, which was not very widespread before this period. Large stores were planned on all the ground floors of these buildings, which had the effect of attracting luxury businesses.

During the Occupation, the German HVS 564 main liaison staff responsible for administering the occupied territory stayed at the Grand Hôtel de la Poste located at 38 of this street. Today, this building is the headquarters of the Consulate of the Republic of Slovenia.

Rue d'Alsace-Lorraine underwent town planning work in 2007 in preparation for Toulouse's hosting of the 2007 Rugby World Cup and then again in 2012, to become pedestrianized over almost its entire length, from the rue Bayard to place Étienne-Esquirol.

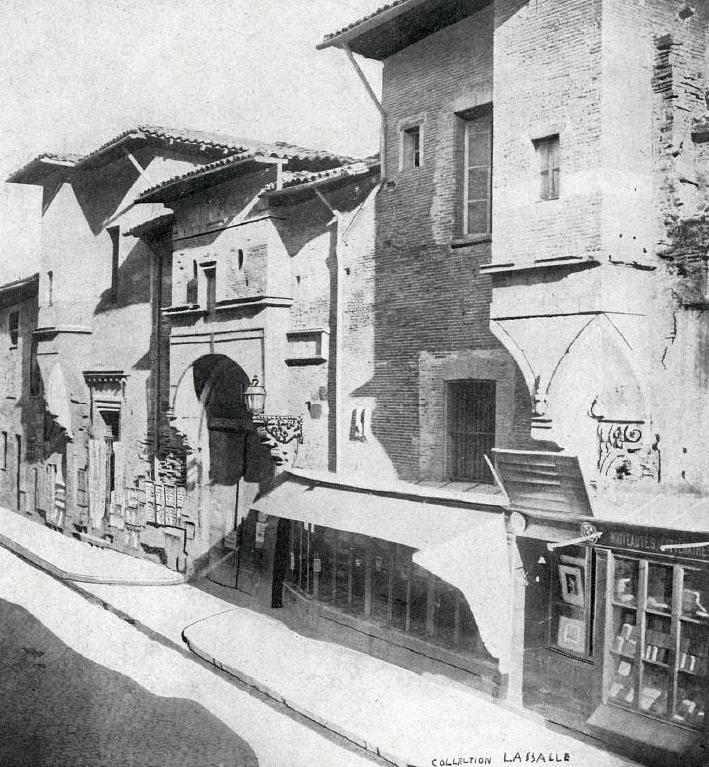
The former Porte de la Commutation on rue Lafayette before the construction of rue Alsace-Lorraine (between 1869 and 1873), opposite the Jardin du Capitole

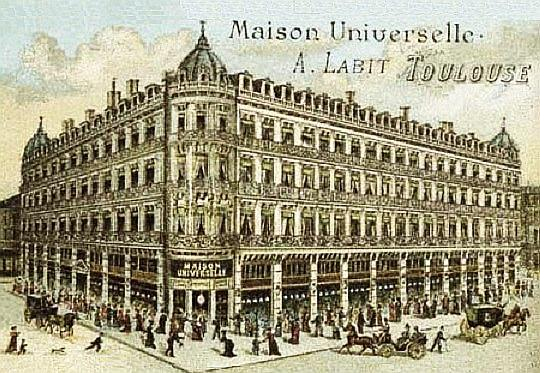
Toulouse 1877, rue Lafayette (L.) and 47 rue Alsace Lorraine (R.) - store La Maison Universelle, or Grand Bazar, by Antoine Labit

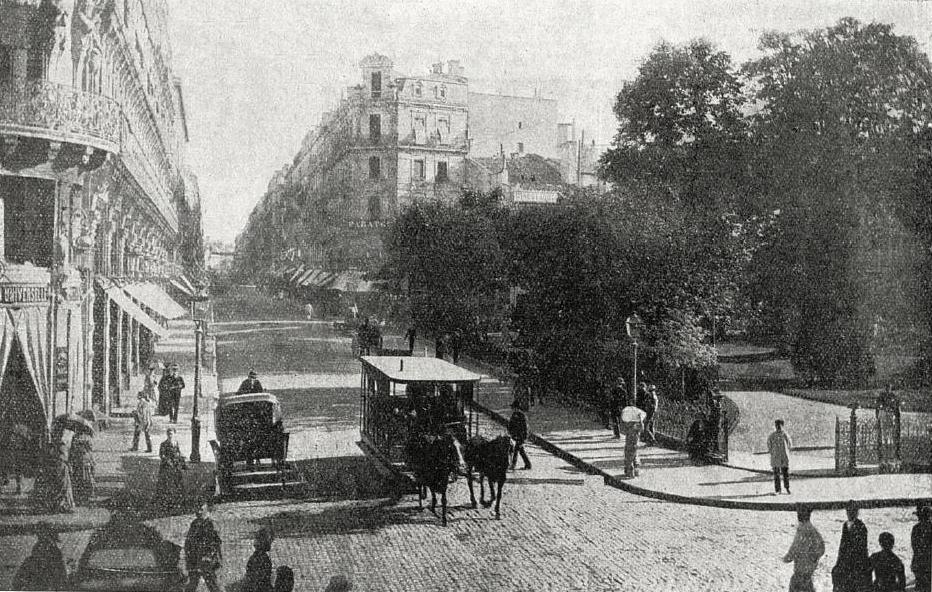
Rue Alsace-Lorraine in Toulouse around 1885 (on the right the square du Capitole)

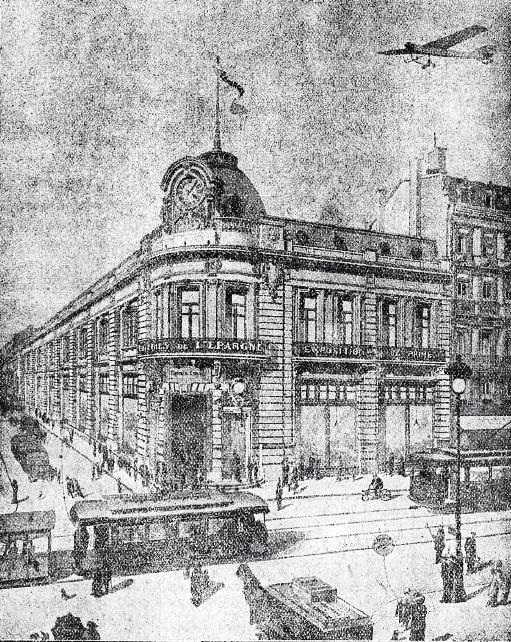
Toulouse 1913, rue Rivals (L.) and 59 rue Alsace-Lorraine (R.) - Galeries de l'Épargne store

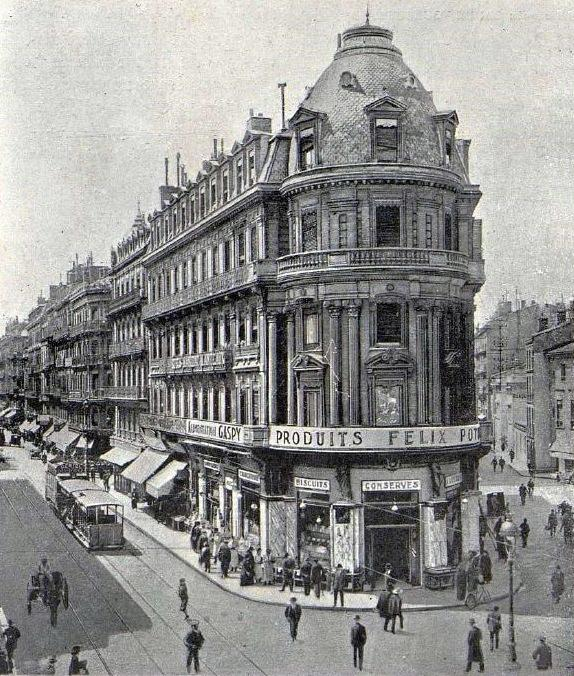
Toulouse 1926, 1 rue Alsace-Lorraine (L.) and rue de Rémusat (R.) - Félix Potin store

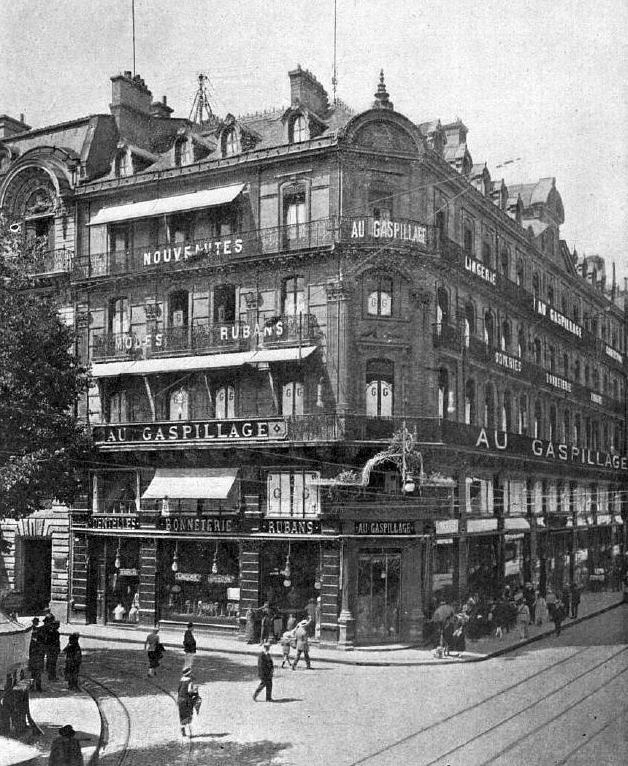
Toulouse 1926, rue Lafayette (L.) and 47 rue Alsace Lorraine (R.) - Au Gaspillage store, now

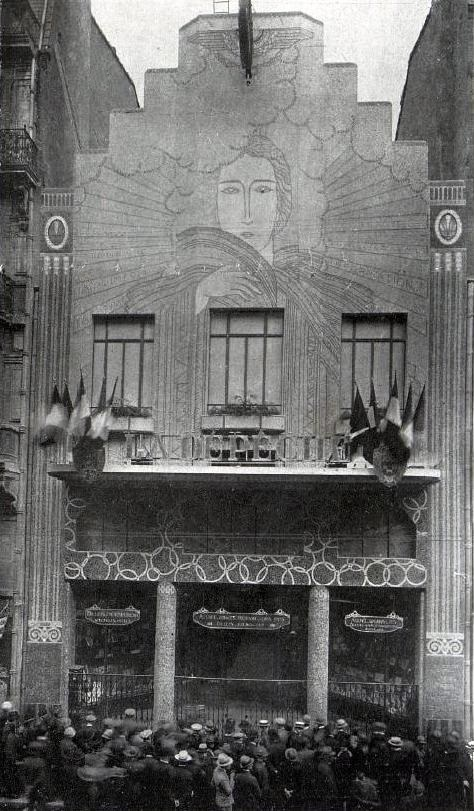
Inauguration of the hall of the new La Dépêche du Midi building, at n°42, on May 2, 1927

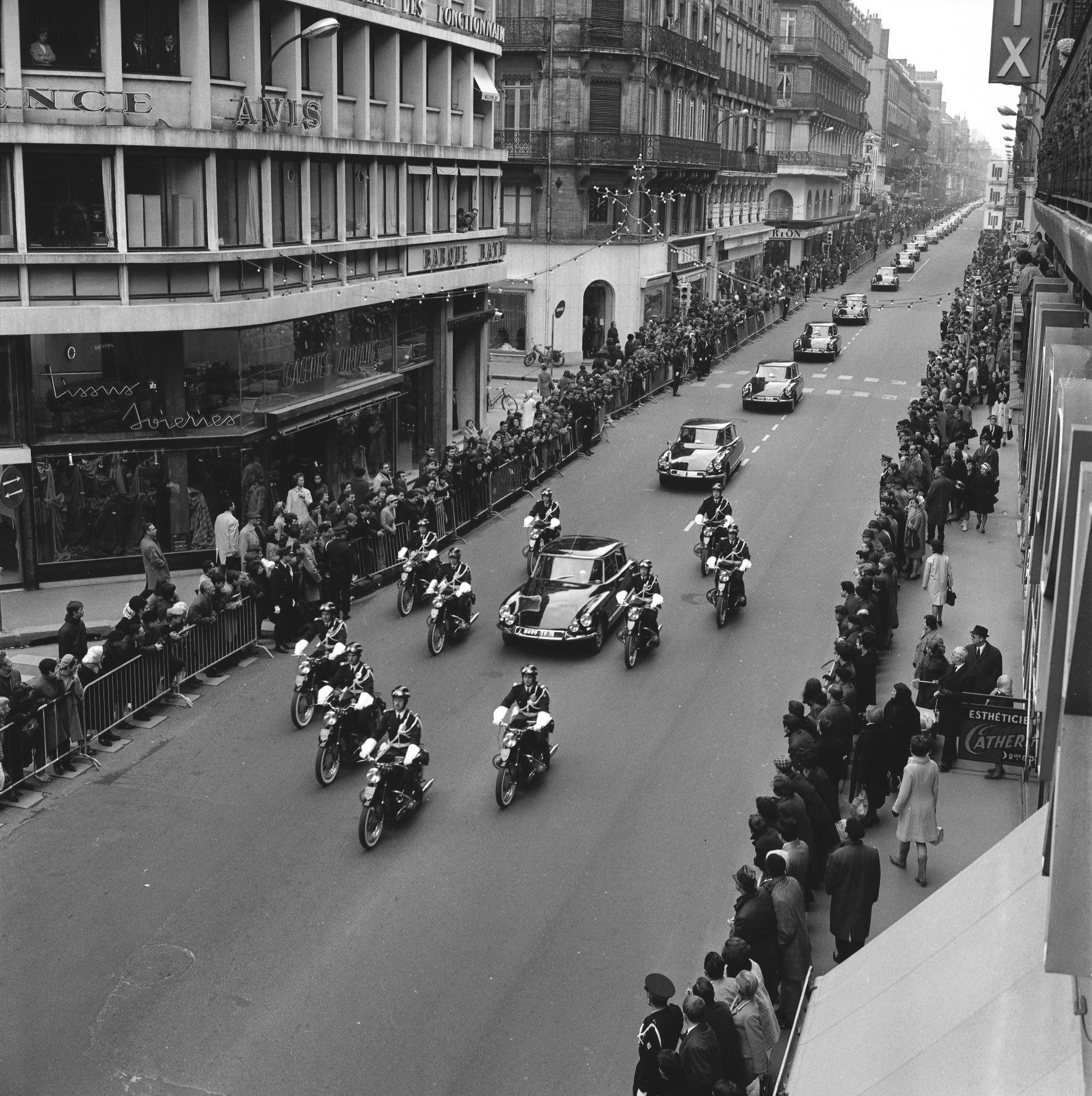
Presidential convoy of Georges Pompidou and Alexei Kosygin on November 5, 1966.

== Heritage and places of interest ==
=== Musée des Augustins ===
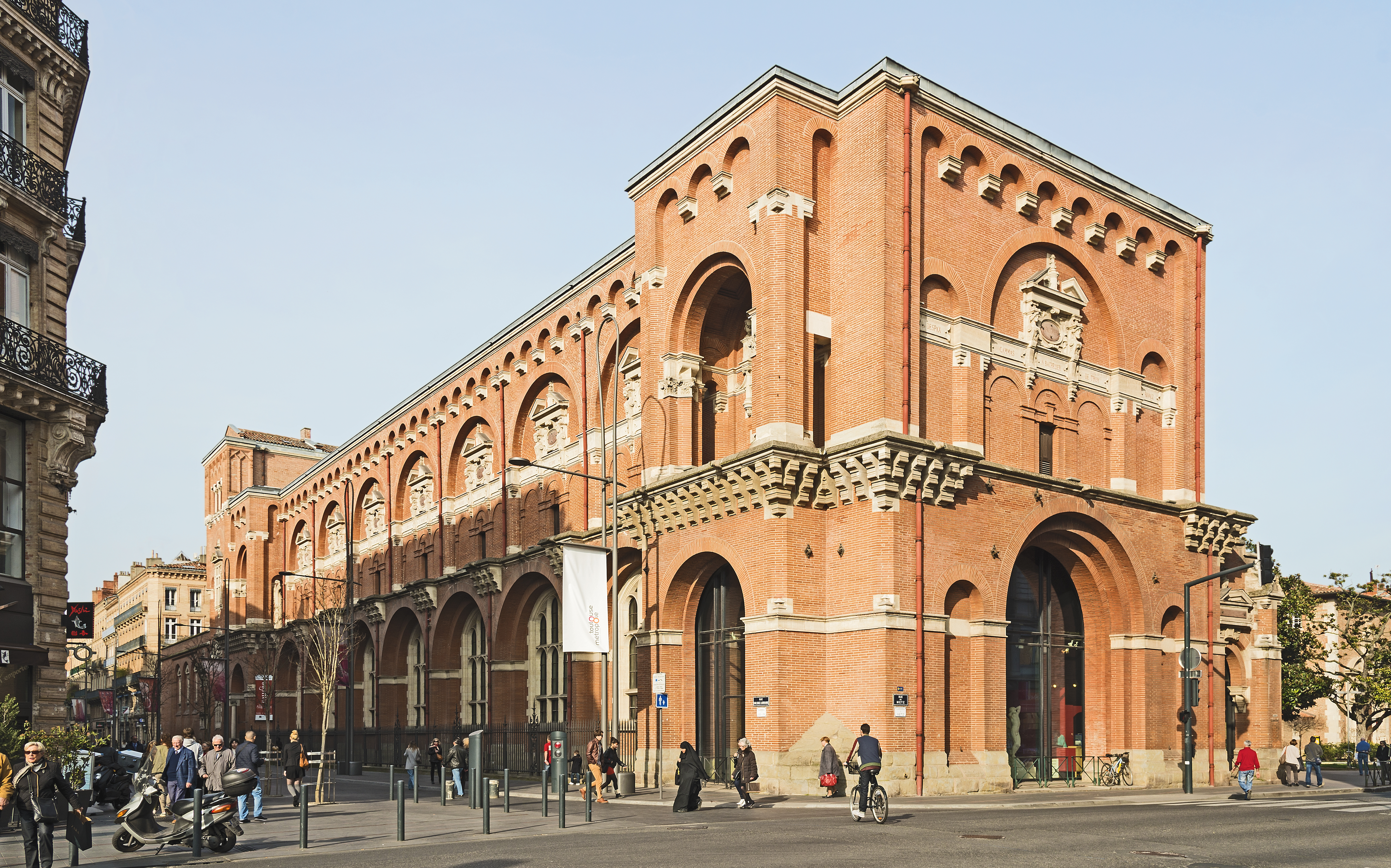
n°2 ter : Darcy wing of musée des Augustins (1893–1903, Denis Darcy).

Classified MH (1840, former Augustinian convent), Listed MH (1990, 19th century wing) and Classified MH (2018, all the buildings making up the Musée des Augustins).

The Musée des Augustins is the municipal museum of fine arts. It occupies the buildings of the former Augustinian convent.

=== Consular Palace ===
A Hôtel particulier was built in the middle of the 17th century for Jean Baptiste de Ciron, lord of Carmaux and president of the parliament of Toulouse. In 1742, it passed to two members of the Roux family, but ten years later it was sold to Count Joseph de Fumel, then, in 1769, it was purchased by the municipality and extensively remodeled to become the residence of the first presidents of the parliament. The French Revolution brought upheavals: in 1790, the parliament was abolished and the town ceded the hotel to the Directory of the department, which left it in November 1799 to settle in the old archbishopric. Consequently, three years later, following the Concordat, the hotel was assigned to the accommodation of the new archbishops. But a century later, in December 1906, under the law of separation, the Hôtel de l'Archevêché was decommissioned, then sold to the city's Chambre de commerce which took possession of it in 1913.

The consular palace is made up of several buildings between rue d'Alsace-Lorraine (current n°2) and rue Croix-Baragnon (current n°6), facing place Rouaix. In 1921, the architects Barthélémy Guitard and Jean Valette were responsible for the construction of a new building along rue d'Alsace-Lorraine, in order to accommodate shops on the ground floor, two apartments on the mezzanine and a « commercial museum » upstairs. In 1936, the building was extended to the south over three bays, covering the facade of the former Ciron-Fumel hotel. The facade, in neo-classical style, is a pastiche of 18th century Toulouse architecture, playing on the polychromy of cut stone and brick. It extends over ten bays and rises over three levels – ground floor, mezzanine and one floor. The ground floor is pierced by large shop openings which alternate with narrower openings. The entrance doors are located in the side bays. The mezzanine and upper floor are lit by rectangular windows, highlighted by a cut stone frame. The windows on the 1st floor have balconies with balusters, supported by heavy carved consoles. They are topped with sculpted friezes and the frame has a clasp loaded with a large volute. The elevation is crowned with a large cornice with dentils and modillions, topped by a balustrade.

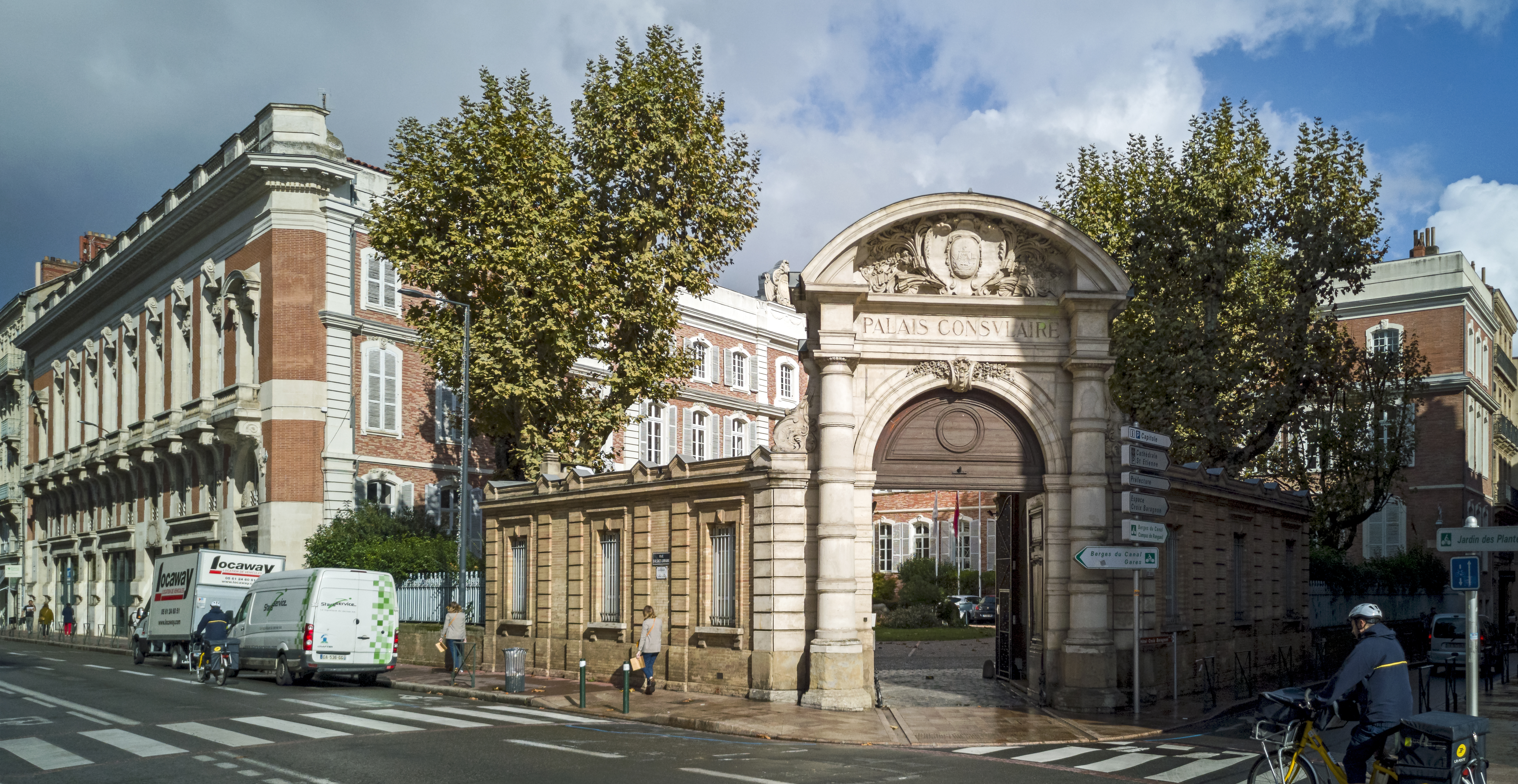
The consular palace seen from place Rouaix.

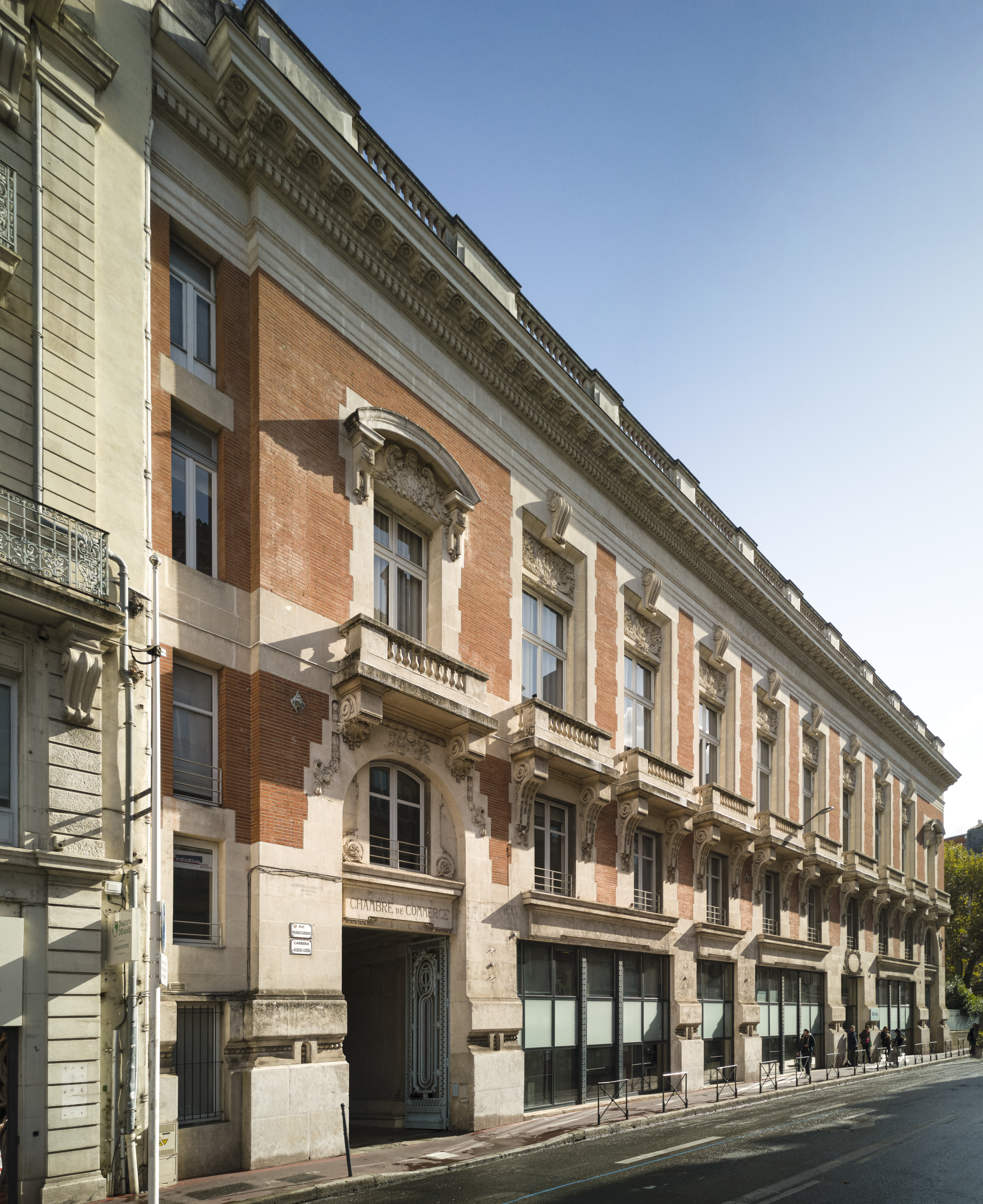
The building on rue d'Alsace-Lorraine (1st half of the 20th century).

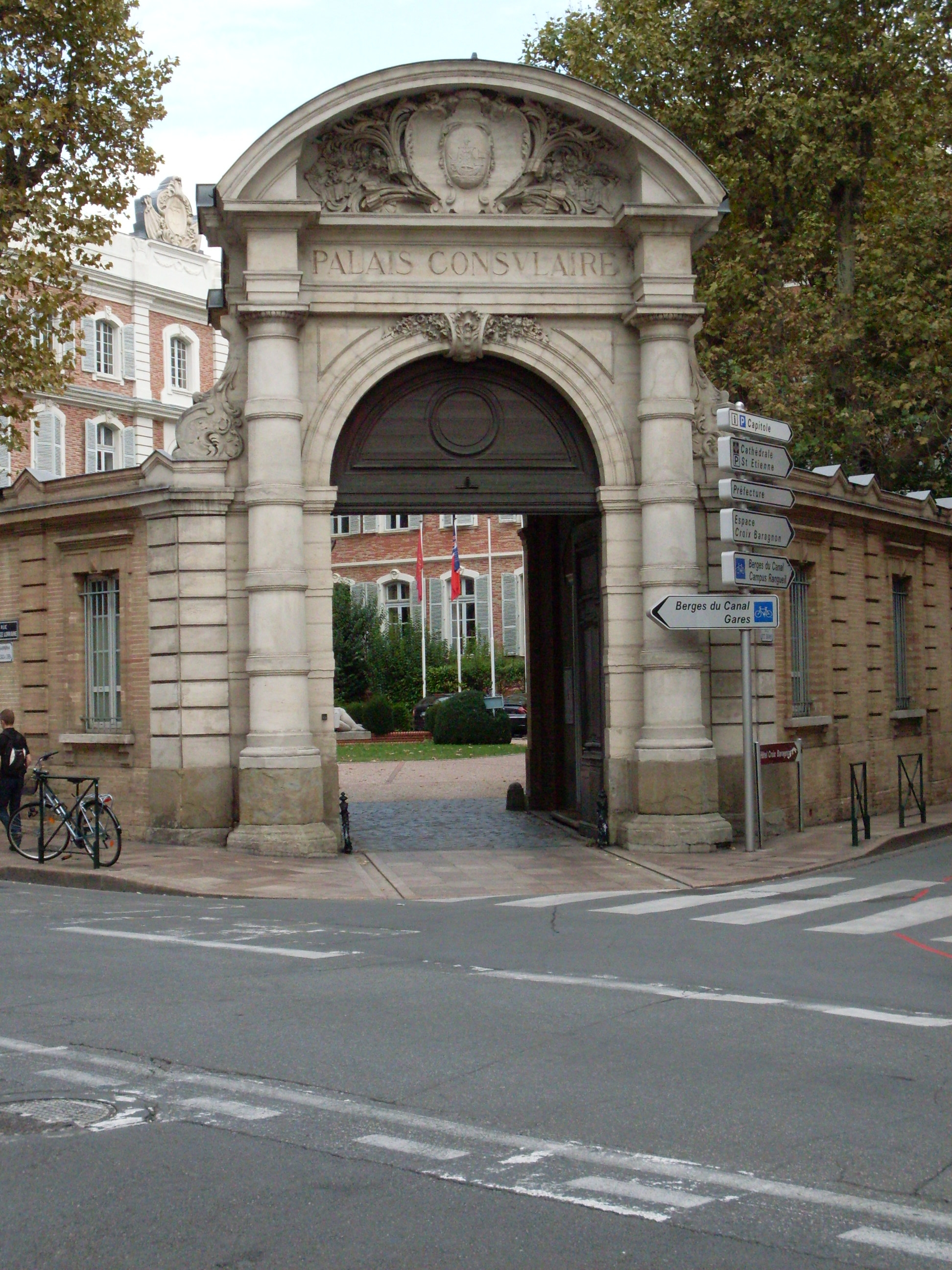
The building at the corner of rue d'Alsace-Lorraine and rue Croix-Baragnon (end of the 19th century).

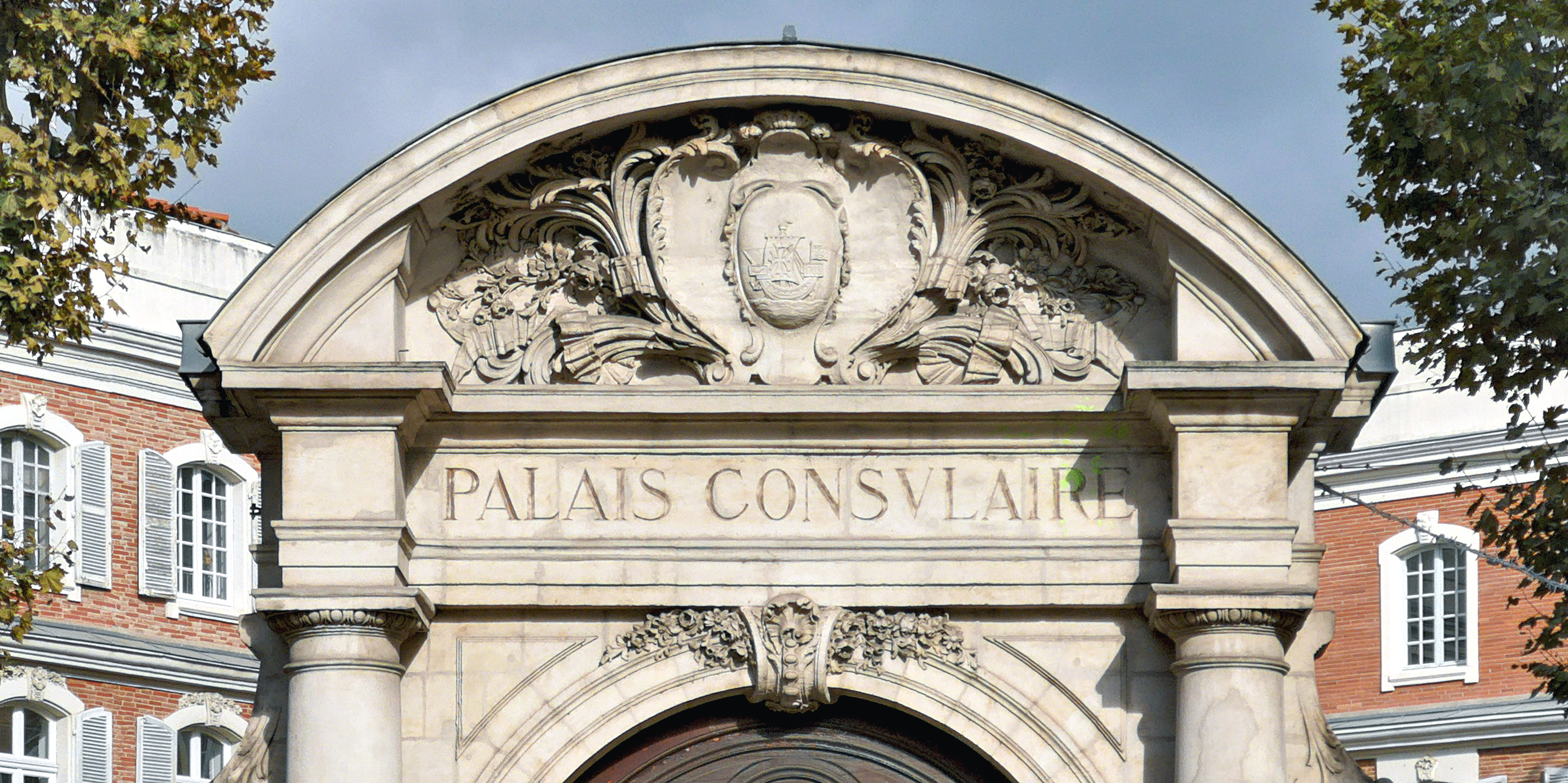
The pediment and coat of arms of the Chamber of Commerce and Industry.

=== Department stores ===
- n°28: La Maison Universelle department store.
- n°37-39: Monoprix department store.
  The Monoprix brand, created in Rouen in 1932 by Max Heilbronn, opened a large store in 1934 in Toulouse on rue de la Pomme (locations of current n°54 and 56). Gradually, the store was expanded by the acquisition of neighboring buildings on rue d'Alsace-Lorraine (locations of current n°37 and 39) and rue de la Pomme (locations of current no°52 and 58 to 62). The construction of a new store was entrusted in 1963 to architects Noël Le Maresquier and Paul de Noyers. The building, in a modern style, rises at the crossroads of rue de la Pomme, forming an acute angle. The facades, almost blind, are covered with a red brick facing. The 2nd floor is opened by four small square windows. The 3rd floor is lit by a continuous strip of windows, highlighted by a protruding frame. The 5th and 6th floors, coated, are set back from the plumb line of the facade.

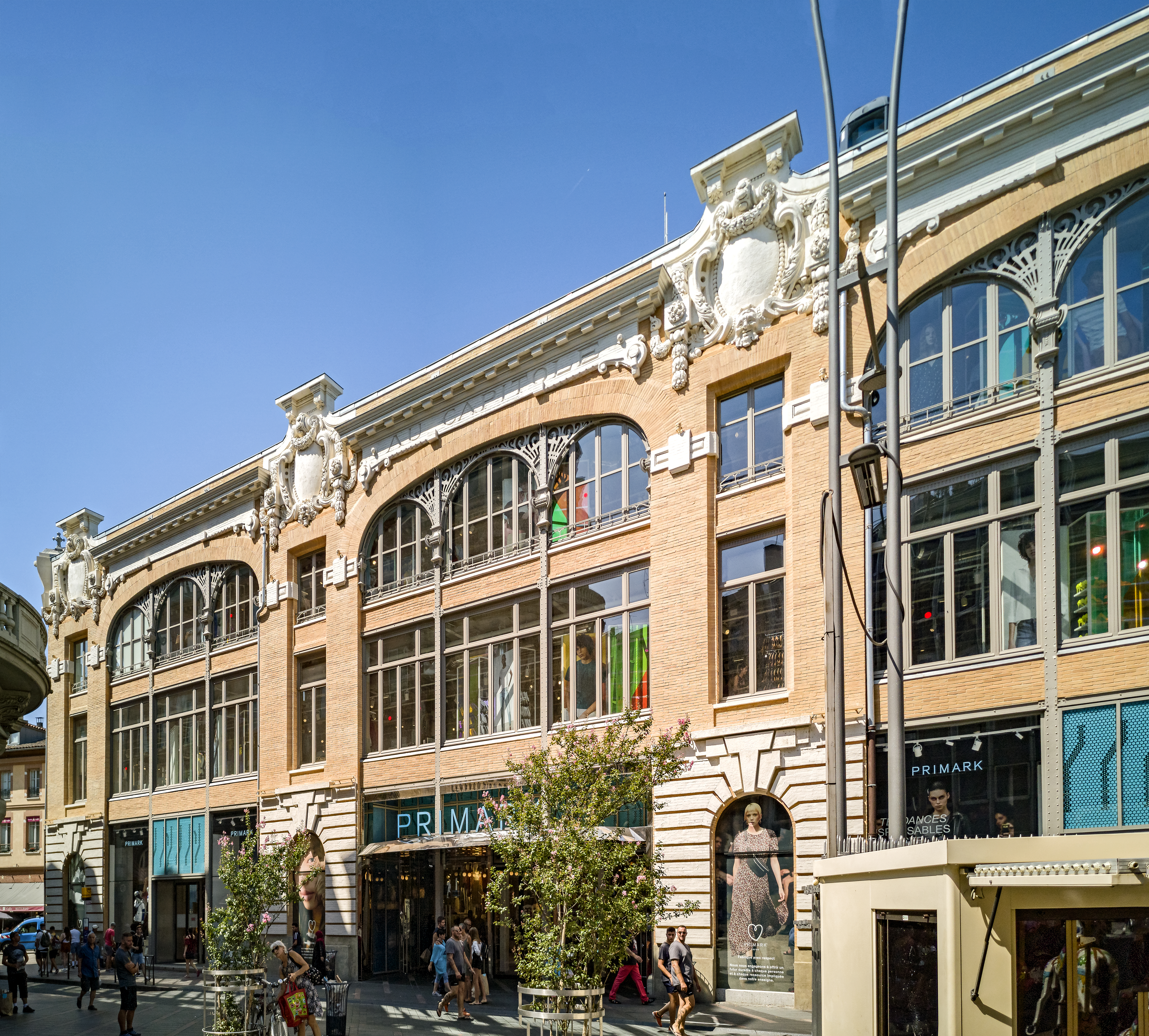
n°37-39: the Au Capitole department store (1904, Georges Debrie).

- n°37-39: Au Capitole department store.
  The Au Capitole department store was built between 1903 and 1904 by the companAux Dames de France, to the plans of the architect Georges Debrie, in the Art Nouveau style. In 1984, the Galeries Lafayette group took over the building. The store closed its doors in 2013 and the building was sold to the Primark group, which opened its Toulouse store in 2018.
  The building is characteristic of constructions from the beginning of the 20th century, with an exposed cast-iron architecture and light brick filling. Georges Debrie, however, respects the forms of Toulouse neoclassical architecture, with an alternation of narrow rectangular openings and wider basket-handle openings. The elevation is thus punctuated by the bays of the doors, highlighted on the ground floor and the mezzanine by the brick bossing and crowned by large medallions sculpted in stone, surrounded by garlands of flowers and leaves and masks. The three large metal basket-handle arches join the intermediate bays. They are intersected by cast iron columns. The elevation is crowned by a broken cornice with modillions. Inside, the architect uses the possibilities offered by the metal architecture to free up a vast central space, covered by a glass dome, which illuminates the heart of the building. The double ramp staircase provides access to the upper levels. An elevator was added, then an escalator, the first in the city when it was installed.

=== Buildings ===
- n°14: Grand Hôtel Tivollier.
  A traveler hotel was built between 1872 and 1873 to the plans of Isidore Villamur on behalf of Auguste Tivollier. The building stands at the corner of rue Baour-Lormian. It houses a hotel, equipped with all modern comforts: 52 rooms, a restaurant, lounges, heating by heater, hydraulic elevator, electric bells connected to the reception. The basement is occupied by the Tivollier pâté factory, the shop being on the ground floor. In 1904, the hotel was closed by Emmanuel Tivollier, son and successor of Auguste, who opened the Grand-Hôtel et Tivollier in association with the Société des Grands Hôtels in rue de Metz (current n°31). Only the pâté shop remained until 1964.
  The eclectic architecture, in the Haussmann style, developed in a rigorous manner. The facade is symmetrical, with the three central bays projecting slightly. The ground floor and the mezzanine are joined by large rectangular openings. On the upper floors, the windows have stone balconies with guardrails: simple balconies on the 1st floor, continuous balconies resting on consoles on the 2nd and 3rd floors. The attic level is covered by a roof with long pitched slate and zinc roofs. It is pierced by dormer windows with a stone frame surmounted by a curvilinear pediment.
  At the crossroads of rue Baour-Lormian, the cut corner concentrates most of the ornamentation. The ground floor and mezzanine are joined by a semi-circular shop arcade. It has preserved its molded doorframe and a clasp which supports a frame, supported by laurel branches and framed by two nymphs holding a gabled scepter and a bunch of grapes. On the 1st floor, the window has a molded jamb, a stone baluster railing and a carved clasp. It is framed by two sheathed atlanteans, which support the balustered balcony of the 2nd floor.
- n°38: Cazeaux and Martin building. The building, built in 1884 by the architect Jacques Lacassin, on behalf of Ms. Cazeaux and Ms. Martin, was occupied, from 1888, by the Grand Hôtel de la Poste. It now houses, on the upper floors, the honorary consulate of Slovenia.
  The building has a long facade of eleven bays. It is driven by a continuous bossing. The ground floor is pierced with rectangular shop openings. The floors are highlighted by the balconies – continuous on the 1st and 3rd floor – equipped with guard rail with cast iron and plant motifs. The attic level, covered by a roof with long pitched slate and tile sides, is pierced with dormer windows. The three central bays are, however, highlighted by a different treatment. On the ground floor, the semi-circular portal has a molded frame, framed by pilasters which support a broken pediment, where the HC monogram takes place, surrounded by leathers, garlands, flowers and a female head. At mezzanine level, two atlanteans support the balcony. On the upper floors, the bays are framed by fluted pilasters with Corinthian capitals, colossal on the 1st and 2nd floors, simple on the 3rd floor. Finally, a curvilinear pediment interrupted by a large dormer window crowns the whole at the attic level.

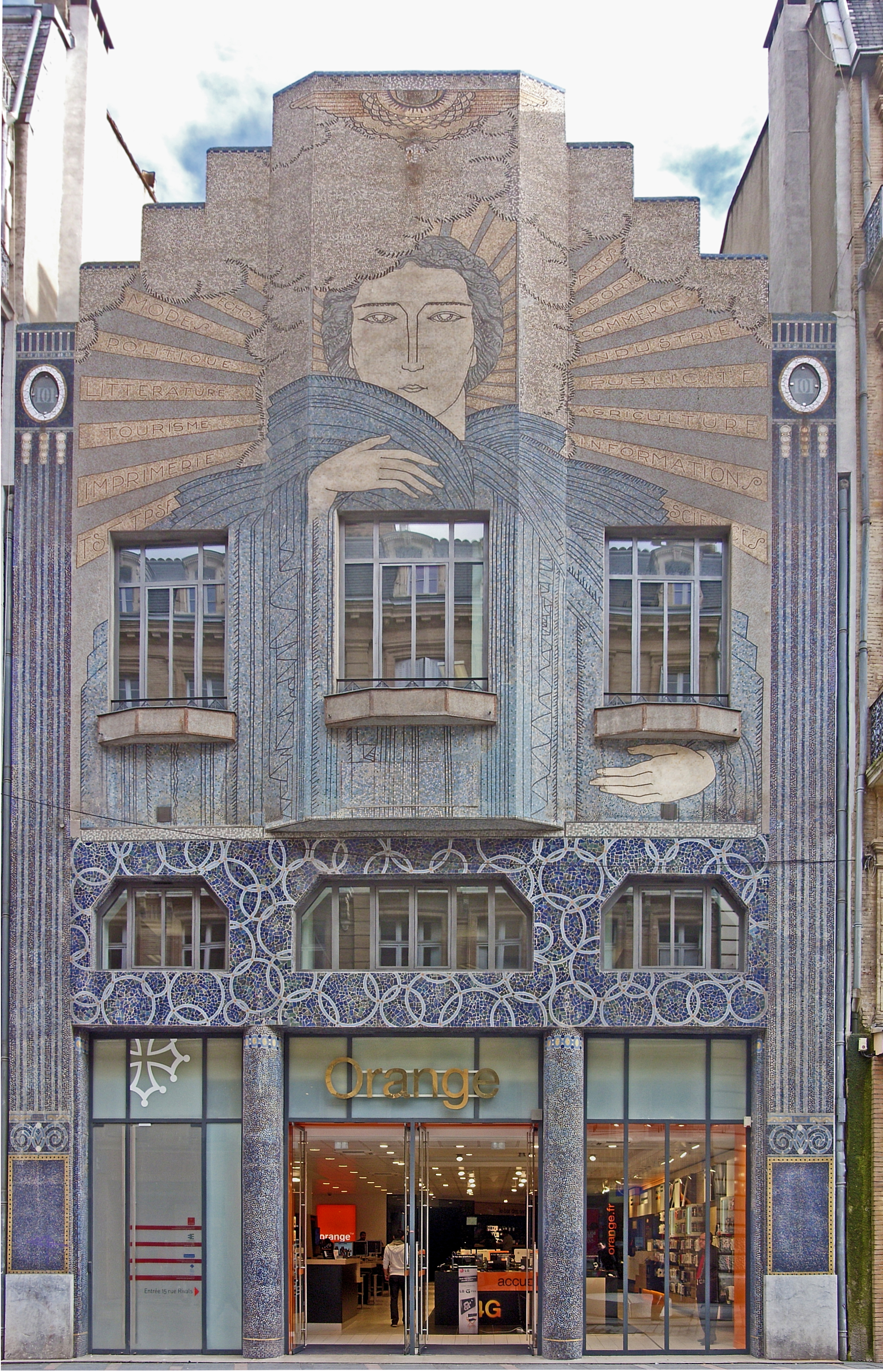
n°42 bis: the facade of the Hall de la Dépêche (1926–1932, Léon Jaussely).

- n°42 bis: Hall de la Dépêche Monument historique (1997, facades and roofs) and Patrimoine du XXe siècle.
  In 1924, Arthur Huc and Maurice Sarraut, co-directors of La Dépêche du Midi, took the decision to build a new headquarters for the newspaper, a large building between rue d'Alsace-Lorraine and rue Rivals (current n°15). The architecture, in Art Deco style, is a manifesto of modernity in the heart of rue d'Alsace-Lorraine, breaking with the Haussmannian facades. The first plans by the architect, Léon Jaussely, date from 1926, but the building was not completed until 1932. It includes on the ground floor a hall for promoting and marketing the newspaper, and on the office floor and staff accommodation.
  The building has a concrete frame. It rises on four levels – a basement, a ground floor, a mezzanine and an upper floor. The facade, three bays wide, is symmetrical and has a stepped gable. It is entirely covered with a predominantly blue mosaic, by Alphonse Gentil and François Bourdet. The sides are decorated with fluted pilasters, surmounted by two oculi in which the monogram of the Dispatch – two intertwined Ds – takes place. The ground floor is punctuated by three large rectangular openings, separated by two columns. The mezzanine is lit by three large windows with canted frames. It is covered with mosaics depicting intertwined rings. The upper floor, where the newspaper's offices were located, has large windows which have balconies with wrought guard rail with geometric patterns. They are surmounted by the entire height of the gable, covered with the main part of the mosaic, a figure of a draped woman, the face surrounded by rays of light in which the different sections of the newspaper are inscribed, and surmounted by a sun and clouds.
- n°46: Gailhard building
  The building was built in 1883 by the architect Jacques Lacassin, on behalf of Pedro Gailhard, a lyrical artist who had a remarkable career in Paris, at the Opéra-Comique, then at the Opera. It presents on rue d'Alsace-Lorraine a facade of an eclectic style animated by neo-Renaissance references. On the upper floors, the three central bays are framed by fluted pilasters with Corinthian capitals. On the 3rd floor, the windows are semi-circular and separated by columns with Ionic capitals, topped with busts. At the attic level, they are crowned by a broken pediment where a large dormer window is located. The mullion of the skylight is decorated with a statue which represents Mephisto, whose role in Charles Gounod's Faust made Pedro Gailhard famous.
- n°49: Lacomme building.
  The building was built around 1881 by the architect Ernest Gazagne, on behalf of Mr. Lacomme. The facade on rue Alsace-Lorraine is imposing, through the exclusive use of cut stone and the richness and heaviness of the decor. The ground floor and mezzanine are joined by two semi-circular shop arcades which frame the entrance door. The door is surmounted, at mezzanine level, by a curvilinear pediment where two lions sit, and by an oval opening, decorated with bas-reliefs with plant motifs. At the same level, sheathed caryatids topped with Ionic capitals separate the bays of the mezzanine, supporting the balcony of the 1st floor. The floors are punctuated by fluted pilasters with composite capitals, colossal on the 1st and 2nd floors, simple on the 3rd floor. The semi-circular windows have a molded frame. They have cast iron transoms and stone balconies, supported by consoles and fitted with cast iron railings. In addition, the central window of the 1st floor has a grimacing Silenus mask on its clasp. The elevation is crowned with a cornice with modillions, topped with a stone balustrade.
- n°59: former headquarters of BNP Paribas.
  The building was built in 1895 to house the regional headquarters of the Comptoir national d'escompte de Paris (CNEP), merged in 1966 with the Banque nationale pour le commerce et l'industrie (BNCI) to create the Banque nationale de Paris (BNP), which became BNP Paribas in 2000, and which it finally left in 2020.
  The building stands on a privileged site, at the corner of rue Rivals (current n°11). It is notable for its eclectic architecture and exuberant decor, particularly the corner rotunda. The 1st floor is highlighted by a balcony, supported by large leafy consoles and decorated with a cast iron railing with geometric patterns. The windows are separated by pilasters with Ionic capitals from which garlands fall, supporting an entablature decorated with marble slabs under a cornice with modillions. The rotunda is crowned with a stone baluster railing and surmounted by a slate-covered dome, partly hidden by a 24-digit clock, inscribed in a skylight. The date of completion of the work can be read in a cartouche, framed by small pilasters which support a broken pediment, whose scrolls frame a woman's head. On Rivals Street, the facade extends over five bays, wide and rectangular, but it received a simpler treatment.
- n°75: Ravel building.
  A first building was built in the mid-19th century on rue Charles-de-Rémusat (current n°55). In 1877, it was integrated into a new building built by the architect Georges Masquet on rue d'Alsace-Lorraine on behalf of Mr. Ravel. The corner of this street is magnified by a light brick rotunda. The ground floor has rectangular openings. The 1st floor is highlighted by a continuous stone and baluster balcony. It is supported by consoles decorated with foliage which alternate with a statue of Industry (a woman wearing a laurel wreath, accompanied by a cogwheel and an anvil) and Commerce (a man accompanied by an anchor and merchandise). The 1st and 2nd floors are pierced with windows with sculpted frames and joined by colossal columns with Corinthian capitals, which support an entablature. The 3rd floor, also with a balustered balcony, is of a similar but simpler style. The cornice with modillions which crowns the elevation is surmounted by a slate dome.

== Personality ==
- Léopold Escande (1902–1980): student of the Institut d'électrotechnique et de mécanique founded in 1907 by Charles Camichel, he was its director and participated in its development as ENSEEHT. He was born at the family home (current n°25).

== See also ==
=== Bibliography ===
==== General works ====
- Chalande, Jules (1992). Mémoires de l'Académie des Sciences et Belles-Lettres de Toulouse (in French). Toulouse. pp. 95–153.
- Salies, Pierre (1989). Dictionnaire des rues de Toulouse (in French). Vol. 2 (Milan ed.). ISBN 978-2-867-26353-8.
- Bernad, Gilles; Jungblut, Guy; Monna, Armand (2001). Toulouse, métamorphoses du siècle (in French). ISBN 2-913319-13-0.

==== Specialized works ====
- Foucaud, Odile (2009). Toulouse, une métropole méridionale. Vingt siècles de vie urbaine (in French). Presses universitaires du Midi. ISBN 978-2-8107-0950-2.
- Papillault, Rémi; Girard, Laura; Marfaing, Jean-Loup (2016). Guide d'architecture du xx^{e} siècle en Midi toulousain (in French). Presses universitaires du Mirail. ISBN 978-2-8107-0469-9.

=== Externals links ===
- « Notice n^{o} 315550118429 » Au nom de la voie, of the website Urban-Hist Archives municipales de Toulouse
- Preliminary inventory of the city of Toulouse of the website Urban-Hist Archives municipales de Toulouse
- General inventory of cultural heritage of Occitania, of the website Ressources patrimoines - La médiathèque culturelle of the Occitania region
