= Boulevard de Strasbourg, Toulouse =

French public road

Boulevard de Strasbourg
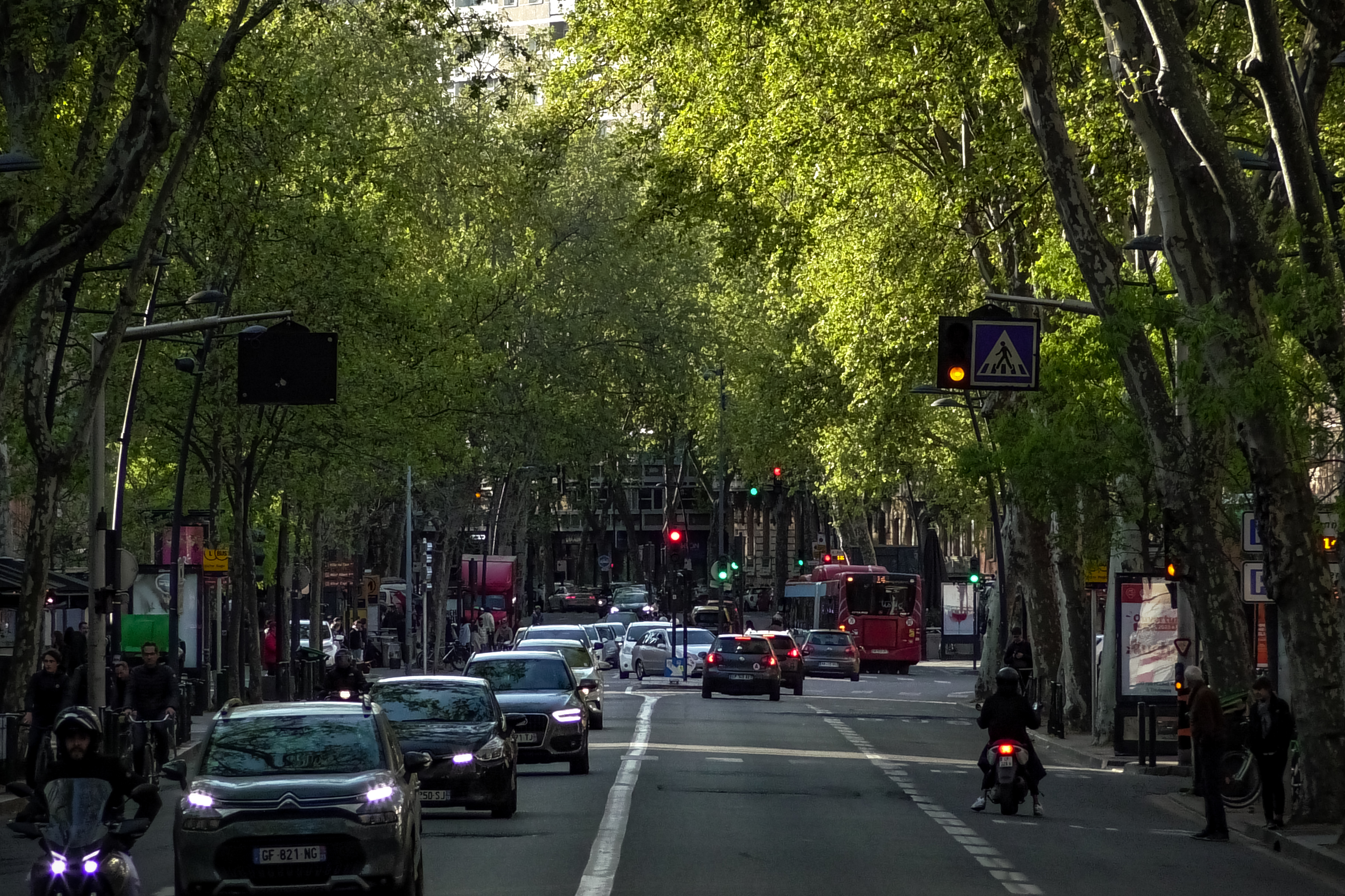
- Boulevard de Strasbourg, seen from the intersection with allées Jean-Jaurès.
- Interactive map of Boulevard de Strasbourg
- Length: 686 m (2,251 ft)
- Location: Toulouse
- Coordinates: 43°36′29″N 1°26′47″E

Boulevard de Strasbourg (French pronunciation: [bulvaʁ də stʁasbuʁ]; in Occitan: baloard d'Estrasborg) is a public road in Toulouse, capital of the Occitania, in the South of France. It is located northeast of the historic center and marks the limit, in its southern part, between quartier Saint-Georges and Matabiau and, in its northern part, between quartier Arnaud-Bernard and Chalets.

== Location and access ==
=== Routes encountered ===
Boulevard de Strasbourg meets the following lanes, in order of increasing numbers (« L » indicates that the street is on the left, « R » on the right):

- Allées du Président-Franklin-Roosevelt (L)
- Allées Jean-Jaurès (R)
- Rue Porte-Sardane (L)
- Rue d'Austerlitz (L)
- Rue Denfert-Rochereau (R)
- Rue Victor-Hugo (L)
- Rue Lafaille (R)
- Rue du Rempart-Matabiau (L)
- Rue de Bayard
- Rue d'Alsace-Lorraine (L)
- Place Jeanne-d'Arc (R)
- Rue Saint-Bernard (L)
- Rue Joseph-Bosc (R)
- Rue Roquelaine (R)
- Rue de l'Arc (L)
- Rue de la Concorde (R)
- Rue Jean-Baptiste-Merly (L)

== Odonymy ==
In 1825, when it was created, it was first called Boulevard de Matabiau. In 1852, it was given the name Napoléon, in honor of Emperor Napoleon III. After the fall of the Second Empire, from 1871 to 1873, it was the Boulevard du Vingt-Deux-Septembre, for September 22, 1792, the day of the proclamation of the First Republic. In 1873, it was finally given the name Strasbourg, to commemorate the annexation of this city in 1871 following the Treaty of Frankfurt. On May 20, 1878, the municipal council wanted to revert to the name Vingt-Deux-Septembre, but without success.

== Heritage and places of interest ==
=== Private mansions ===
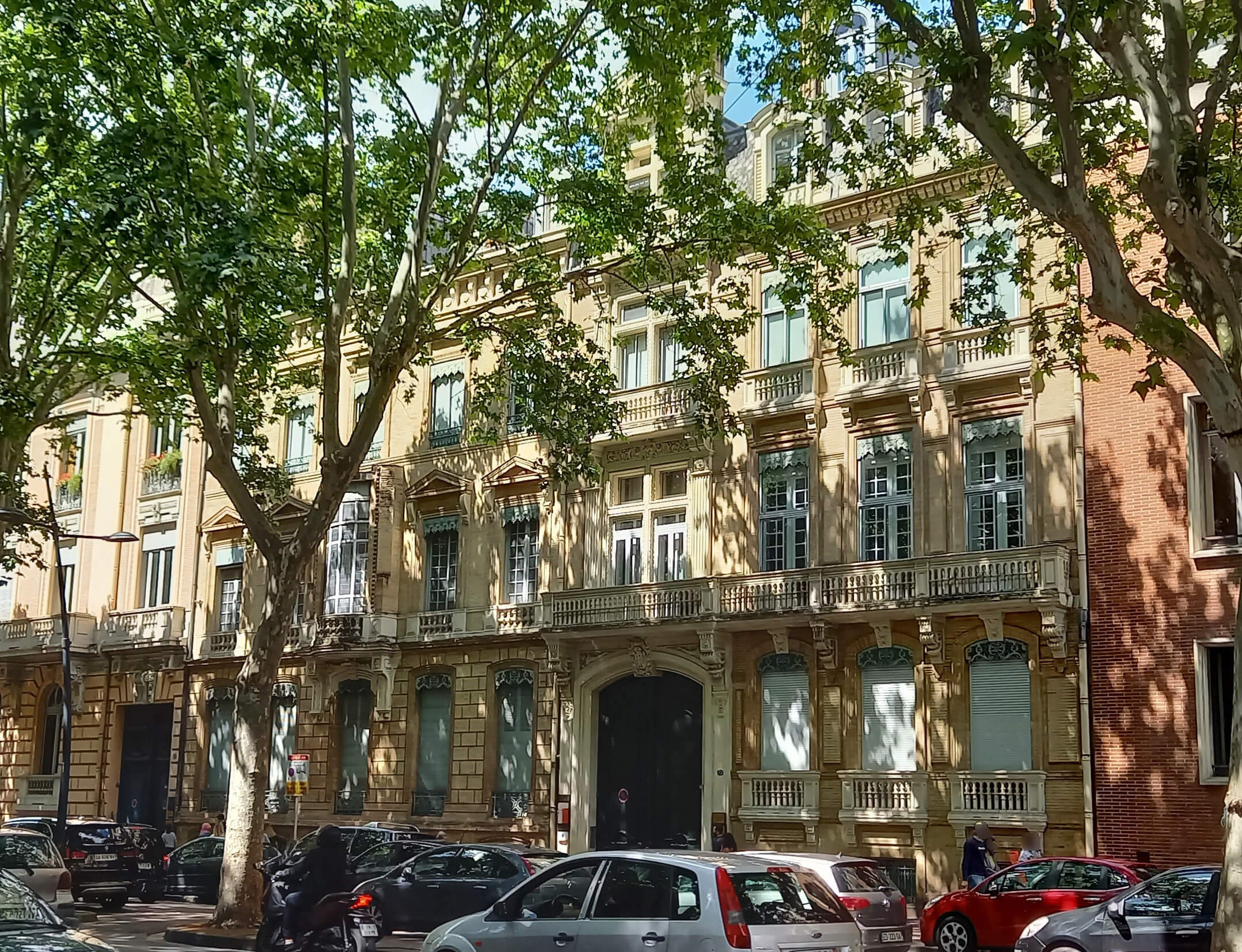
n°72 : facade of the Pauilhac hotel.

- n°52: Baylet hotel. Registered MH (2019, facades and roofs, hall, stairwell and garden).
  The hotel, built in the second half of the 19th century, was enlarged and extensively redeveloped between 1933 and 1934 by the architect Louis Corlouër – nephew of Fulgence Bienvenüe – at the request of Jean Baylet. The Baylet hotel, through its interior decorations, is representative of the residences of the Toulouse bourgeoisie of the first half of the 20th century.
- n°68-72: Hôtel Léotard, then Pauilhac; headquarters of the JOB company; Réseau Canopé of the Toulouse academy. The 72 hosted a voluntary (HB28 bis) and auxiliary (HA301) hospital of the Association of French Ladies (Red Cross). In 1939, the Polish consulate was located there.
- n°76: hôtel Calvet.
  The hotel was built in 1910 by the architect Barthélémy Guitard, at the request of Antoine-François Calvet. Industrialist and manufacturer, but also professor at the École des Beaux-Arts, he married Juliette Pauilhac who, on the death of her father Léon Pauilhac, director of the JOB company, received ownership of the house at no. corner of rue de la Concorde. Antoine-François Calvet had it demolished to build a Hôtel particulier in the eclectic Louis XVI style. It consists of a main house, a courtyard and outbuildings located at the back of the courtyard.
  The elevation on Boulevard de Strasbourg is developed on four levels: a basement, a ground floor, two floors and an attic level. The ground floor, treated in continuous bossage, is pierced with large segmental windows. In the right bay, a large porch, topped with a stone clasp, gives access to the interior courtyard. On the upper floors, the windows are rectangular. On the 1st floor, they are highlighted by a continuous balcony with stone balusters, supported by heavy consoles and have carved lintels. On the 2nd floor, they have simple balconies with wrought iron railings. The elevation is crowned with a cornice with dentils and modillions. The roof, with long pointed sides covered in slate, is lit by bull's-eye skylights.

=== Other buildings ===
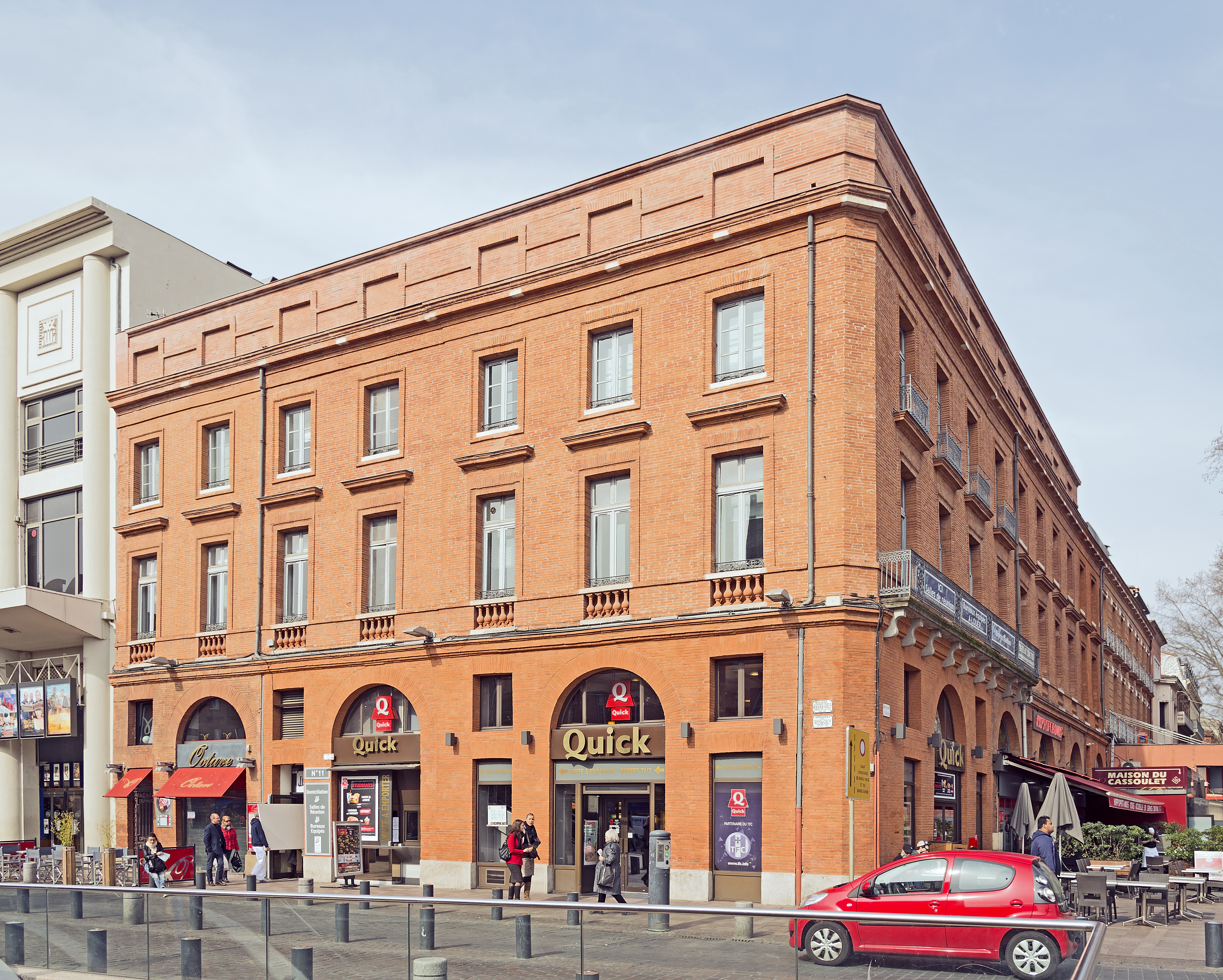
N°1: facade of the building.

- n°1: building : Monument historique (1974, facades and roofs).
  The building was built between the allées du Président-Roosevelt (current n°11) and the Boulevard de Strasbourg, as part of the development of place Wilson, from 1824 to 1834, on the plans of the architect of the City, Jacques-Pascal Virebent. The facade has four bays and rises over five levels (ground floor, mezzanine, two floors and an attic). The ground floor is made up of large arcades of semi-circular shops which alternate with narrower rectangular openings. On the 1st floor, the windows are topped with a cornice. They no longer have the original guard rail with terracotta balusters, replaced by a continuous balcony with its wrought iron. The 2nd floor windows also have wrought iron guard rail. The elevation is crowned with a cornice topped with an attic band.
- n°2: Franklin-Roosevelt Residence.
  The building was built in the modern style between 1970 and 1975 by the architect Pierre Lafitte, at the corner of allées Jean-Jaurès. The construction of the building led to the destruction of the Hôtel Vitry, built by the architect Urbain Vitry between 1837 and 1843.
- n°3: building.
- n°6: Le Trianon cinema.
- n°10: building.
  The building was built in 1955 by the architect Pierre Génard, an architect representative of the modern movement in Toulouse. The ground floor, occupied during construction by the Métropole garage, has been allocated since 2013 to the Parapharmacie Lafayette.
- n°12: headquarter of Compagnie minière de Carmaux.
- n°51: building.
- n°67: building; Algerian consulate.
  The building was built in 1862, at the corner of rue de l'Arc, by the architect Dominique Petit in 1862. It was raised two floors later. Since March 2013, the building, acquired and renovated by the Algerian state, has housed the Algerian consulate in Toulouse.
- n°71-73: Czulowski building (1966-1967, Bernard Bachelot).

=== Kiosk ===
The kiosk was built between 1931 and 1932 to plans by Jean Montariol, for place Étienne-Esquirol. It was moved in the 1950s and now stands at the corner of Boulevard de Strasbourg, rue du Rempart-Matabiau and rue de Bayard. It is representative of the Art Deco style that the architect developed at this time. It is built of reinforced concrete, but covered with a light coating imitating stone. It has six faces, pierced on its five sides with large openings. A colored sandstone mosaic decor helps to liven up the elevations: it takes place under the support of the openings and in the bands which link them. The kiosk is finally topped by a large overhanging roof which protects customers from bad weather.

== Personalities ==
- Jean Baylet (1904-1959): owner of La Dépêche du Midi, close to radical-socialist circles in Toulouse, he lived in the hotel at no 52. He was also responsible for the construction of housing for the employees of the Dispatch, between boulevard de l'Embouchure (current n°48) and avenue Parmentier.
- Pierre Dac (1893-1975): during the World War II, between 1940 and 1941, he lived with Fernand Lefèbvre (1905-1946) in an apartment at n°42.
- Frédéric Estèbe (1863-1936): administrator of the Colonies, Frédéric Estèbe worked in Madagascar, in Ubangui-Chari in French Equatorial Africa, French Congo and Reunion Island. He was also a Republican and a Freemason, Grand Master of the Grand Orient of France in 1930. He lived in Toulouse in an apartment on Boulevard de Strasbourg (current n°54).

== See also ==
=== Bibliography ===
- Salies, Pierre (1989). Dictionnaire des rues de Toulouse (in French). Vol. 2 (Milan ed.). ISBN 978-2-8672-6354-5.
- de Capella, Marie-Laure (2008). Les maîtres bâtisseurs toulousains (tome 3) (in French) (Terrefort ed.). ISBN 978-2-9110-7539-1.

=== Externals links ===
- Preliminary inventory of the city of Toulouse, on the Urban-Hist website, Archives municipales de Toulouse
- General inventory of cultural heritage of Occitania, on the website Ressources patrimoines - La médiathèque culturelle of Occitania region
