= Merville, Haute-Garonne =

Merville
- Commune
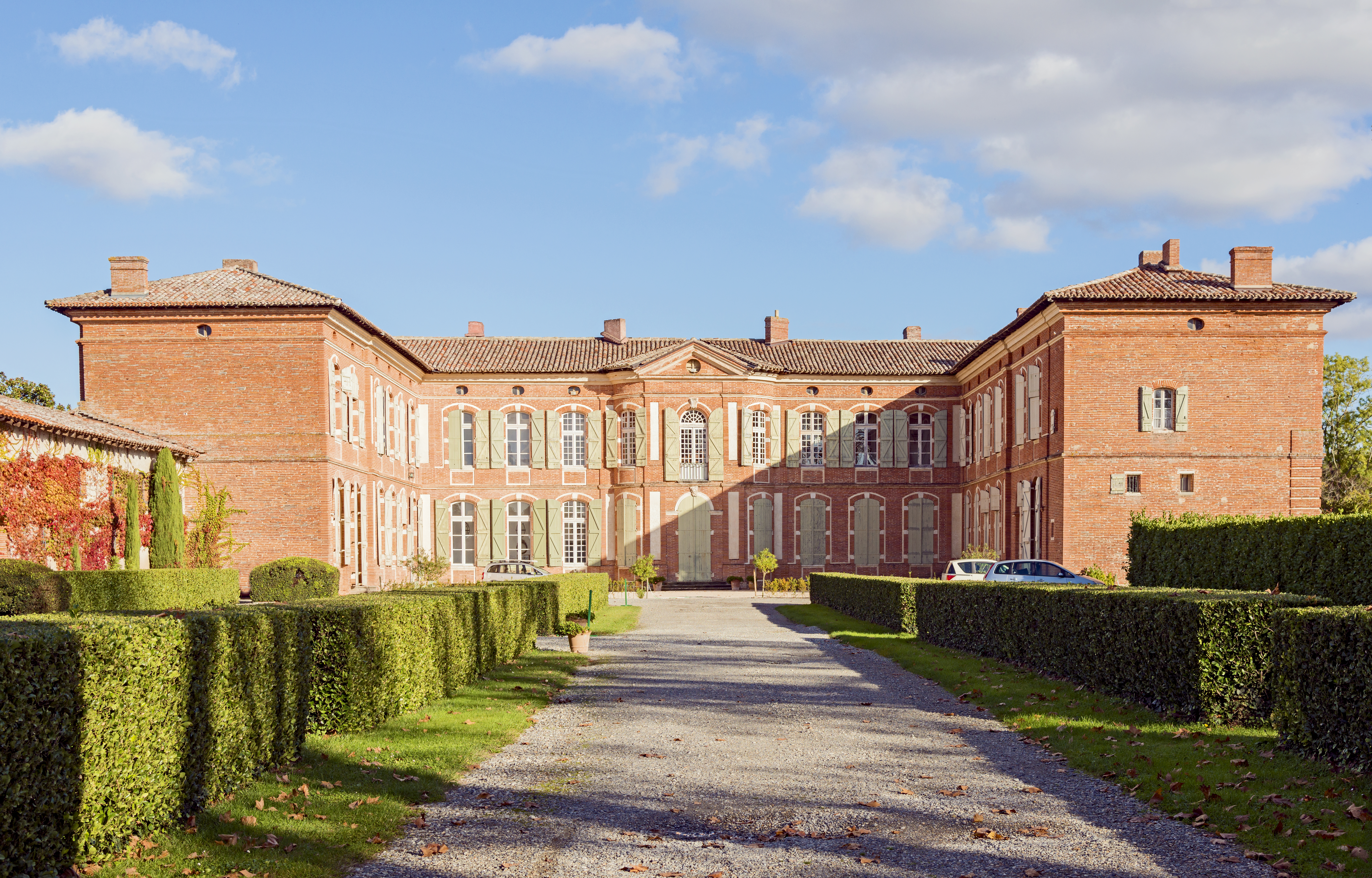
- The chateau in Merville

- Coat of arms
- Location of Merville
- Location within France Location within Occitanie
- Coordinates: 43°43′21″N 1°17′54″E
- Country: France
- Region: Occitania
- Department: Haute-Garonne
- Arrondissement: Toulouse
- Canton: Léguevin

Government
  - Mayor (2020–2026): Chantal Aygat
- Area^{1}: 30.68 km^{2} (11.85 sq mi)
- Highest elevation: 179 m (587 ft)
- Lowest elevation: 105 m (344 ft)
- Population (2023): 6,760
  - Density: 220/km^{2} (571/sq mi)
- Time zone: UTC+01:00 (CET)
  - Summer (DST): UTC+02:00 (CEST)
- INSEE/Postal code: 31341 /31330
- ^{1} French Land Register data, which excludes lakes, ponds, glaciers > 1 km^{2} (0.386 sq mi or 247 acres) and river estuaries.

Merville (French pronunciation: [mɛʁvil]; Occitan: Mervila) is a commune in the Haute-Garonne department in southwestern France.

== Population ==
Historical population

Year	Pop.	±% p.a.
1793	1,125	—
1800	776	−5.17%
1806	991	+4.16%
1821	1,106	+0.73%
1831	1,117	+0.10%
1836	1,215	+1.70%
1841	1,198	−0.28%
1846	1,287	+1.44%
1851	1,237	−0.79%
1856	1,282	+0.72%
1861	1,285	+0.05%
1866	1,241	−0.69%
1872	1,190	−0.70%
1876	1,181	−0.19%
1881	1,213	+0.54%
1886	1,134	−1.34%
1891	1,136	+0.04%
1896	1,081	−0.99%
1901	1,070	−0.20%

Year	Pop.	±% p.a.
1906	1,047	−0.43%
1911	995	−1.01%
1921	865	−1.39%
1926	873	+0.18%
1931	867	−0.14%
1936	873	+0.14%
1946	872	−0.01%
1954	949	+1.06%
1962	914	−0.47%
1968	1,053	+2.39%
1975	1,365	+3.78%
1982	1,929	+5.06%
1990	2,289	+2.16%
1999	2,796	+2.25%
2007	4,470	+6.04%
2012	4,885	+1.79%
2017	5,615	+2.82%
2023	6,760	+3.14%

Source: EHESS and INSEE (1968-2023)

== Monument ==
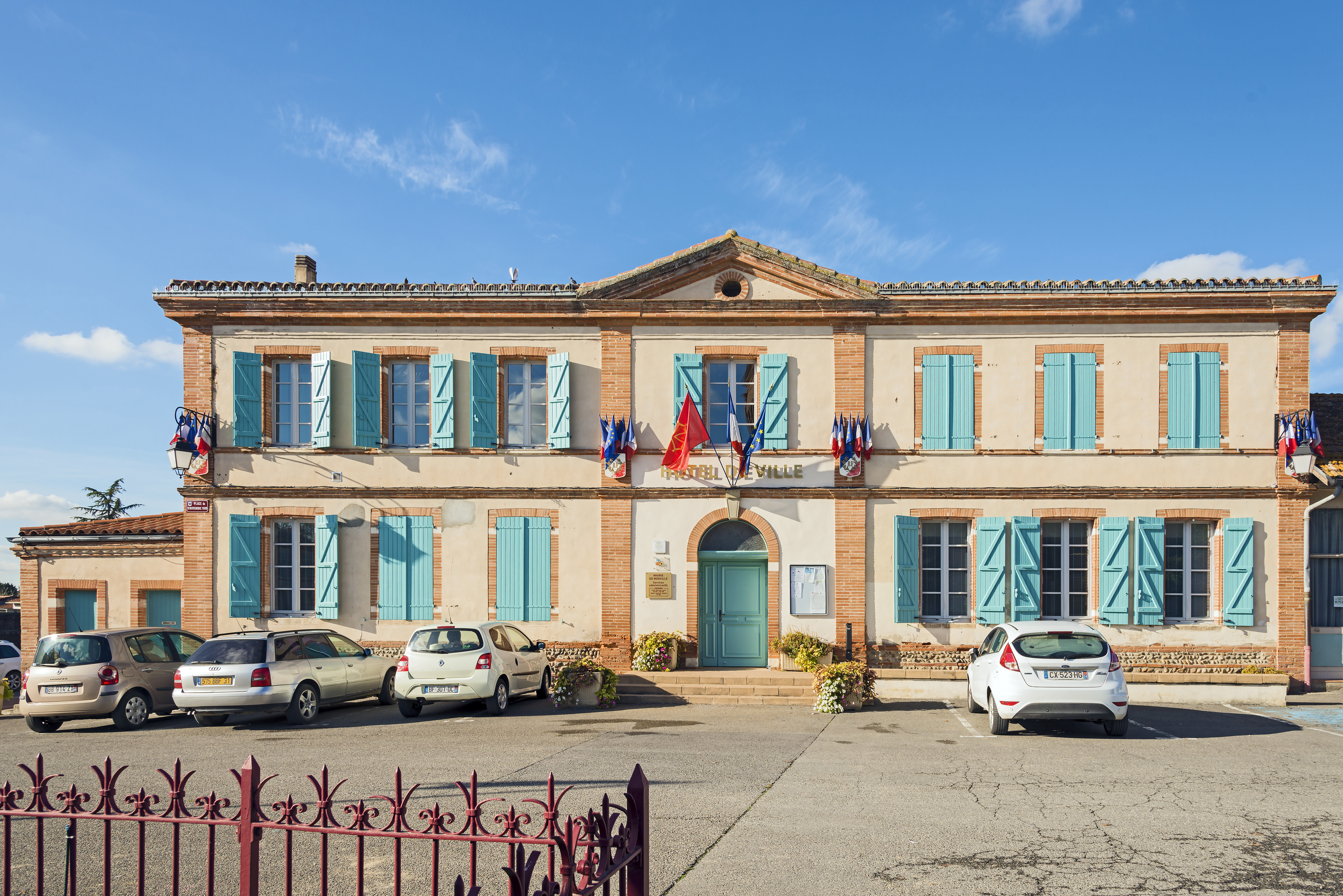
Town hall

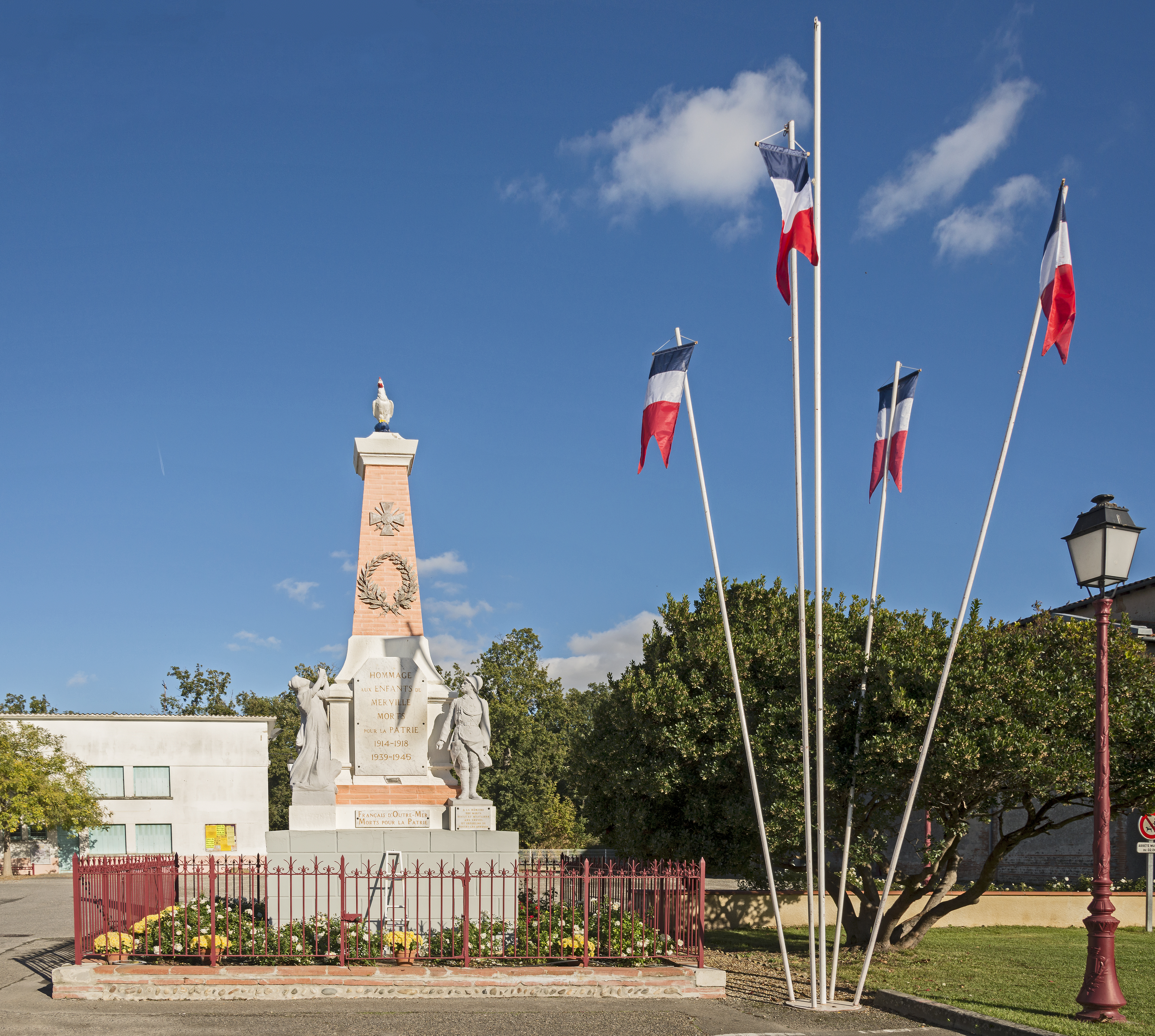
War memorial

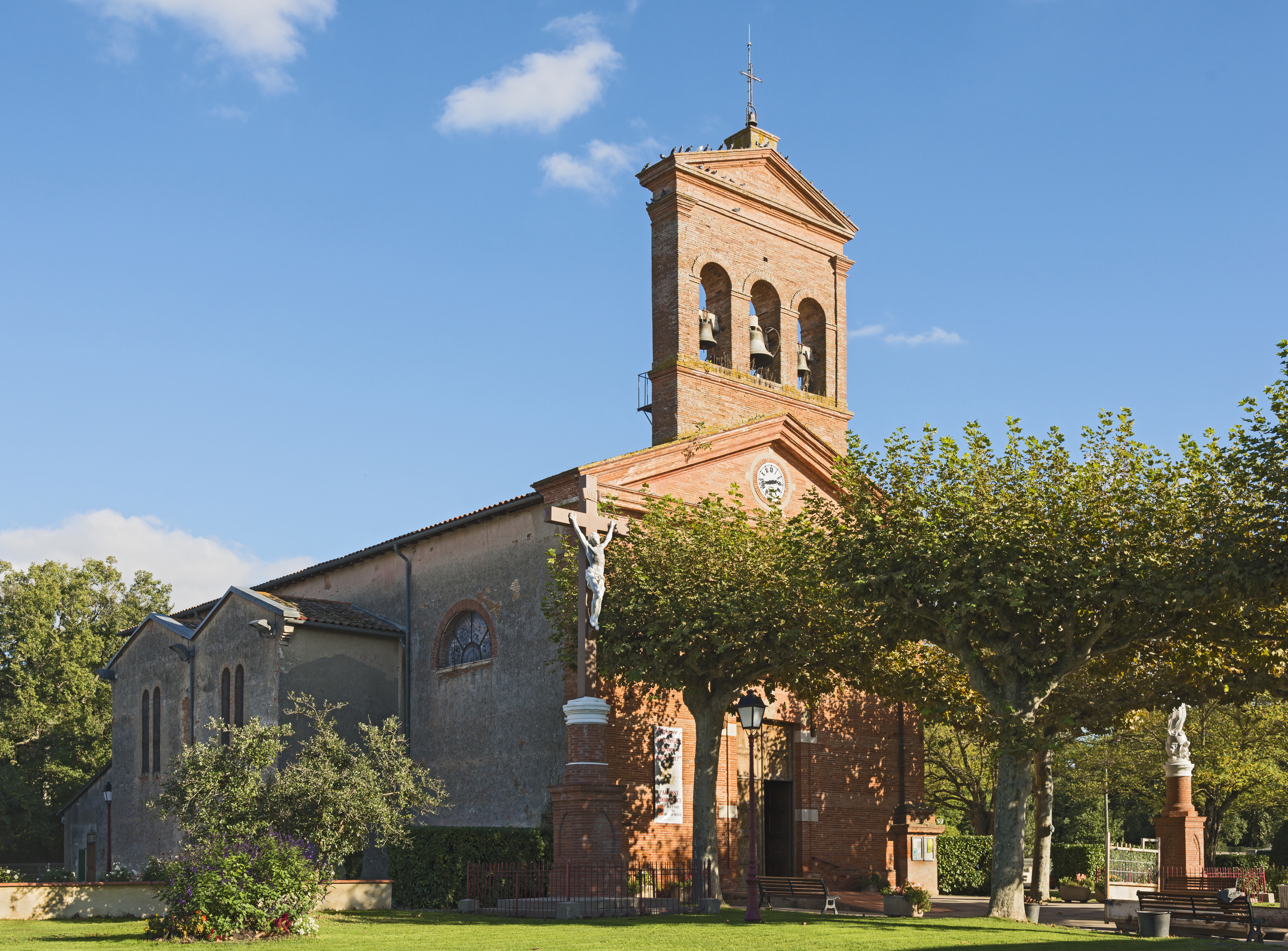
Church St Saturnin

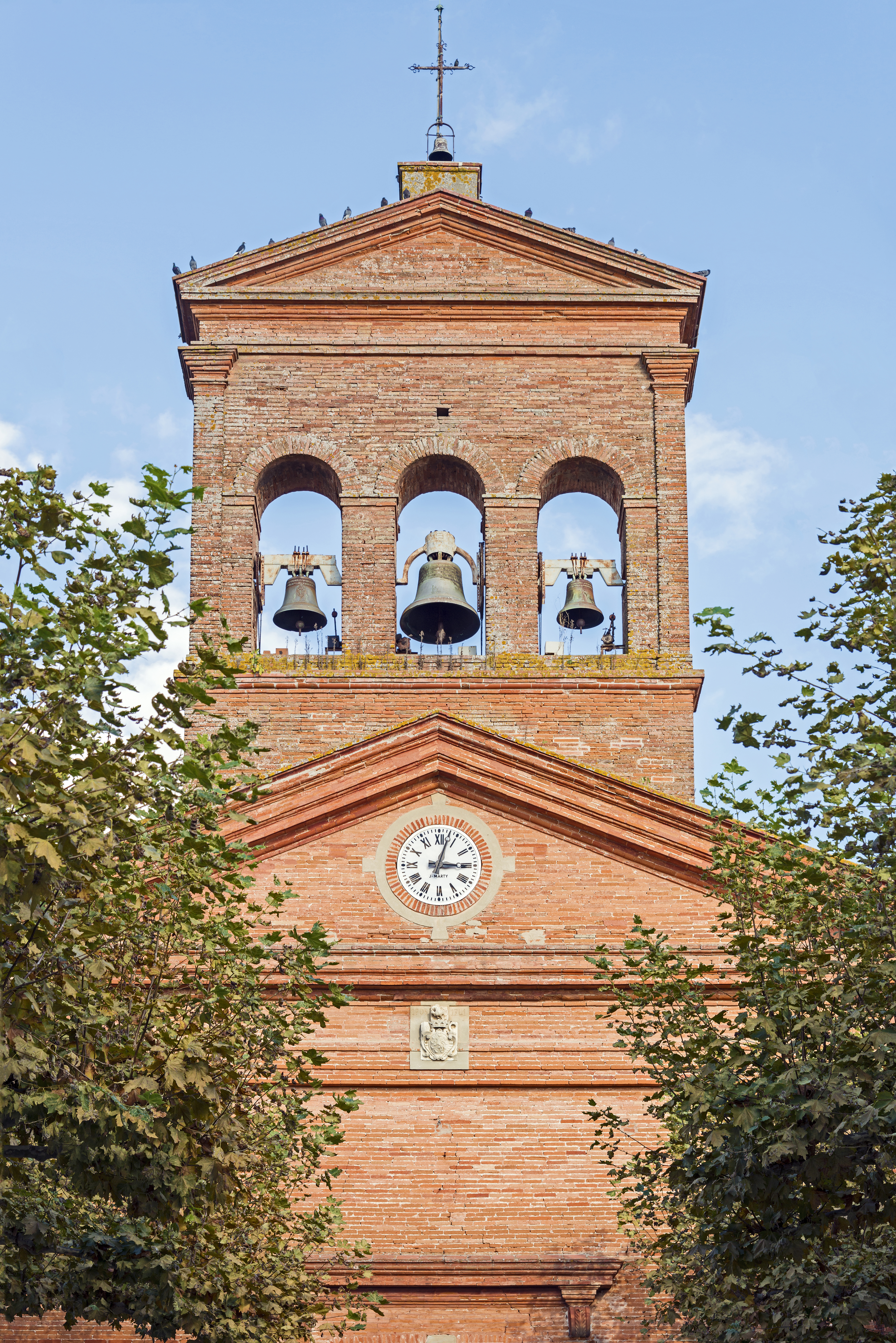
Bell gable

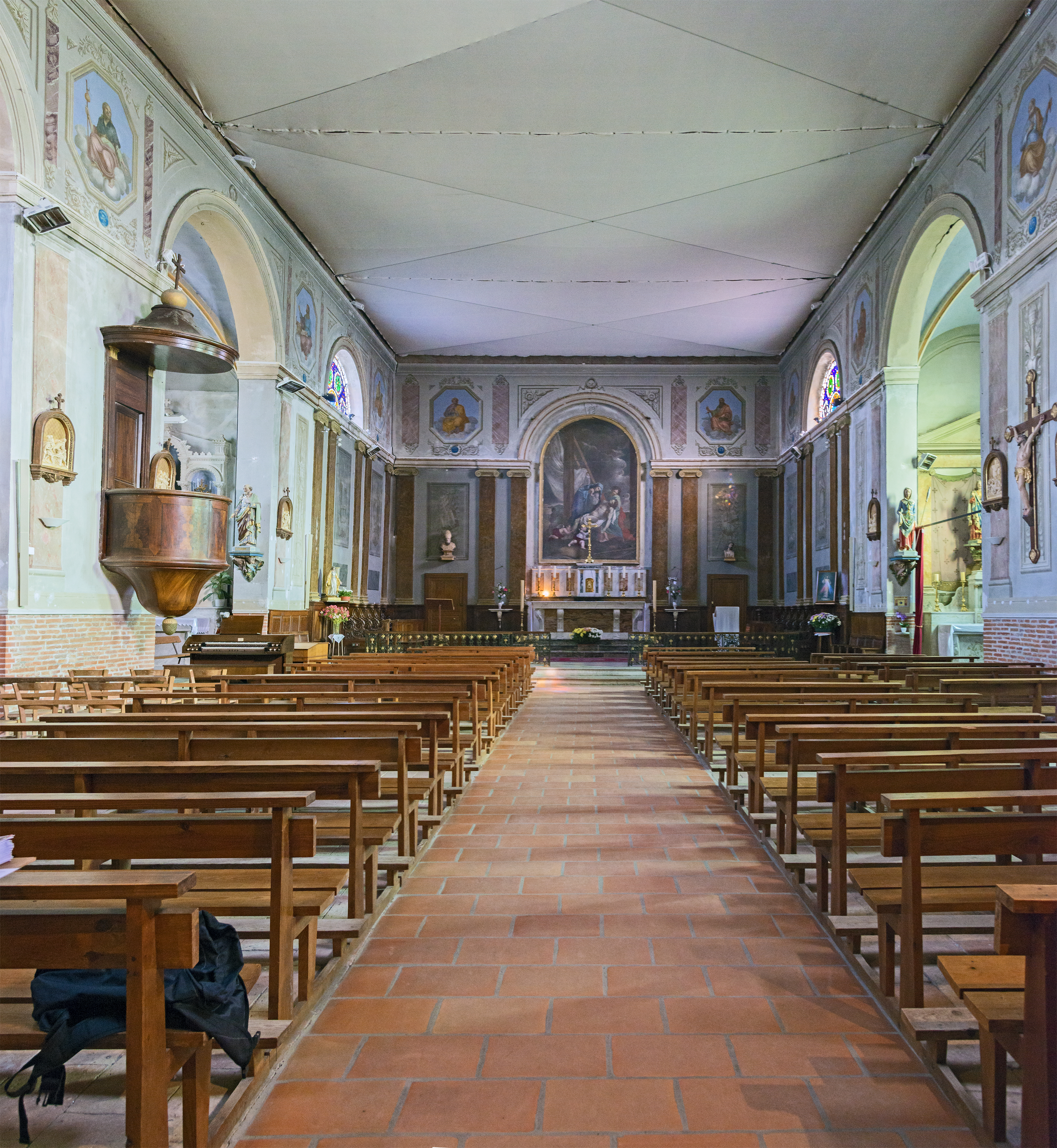
Nave

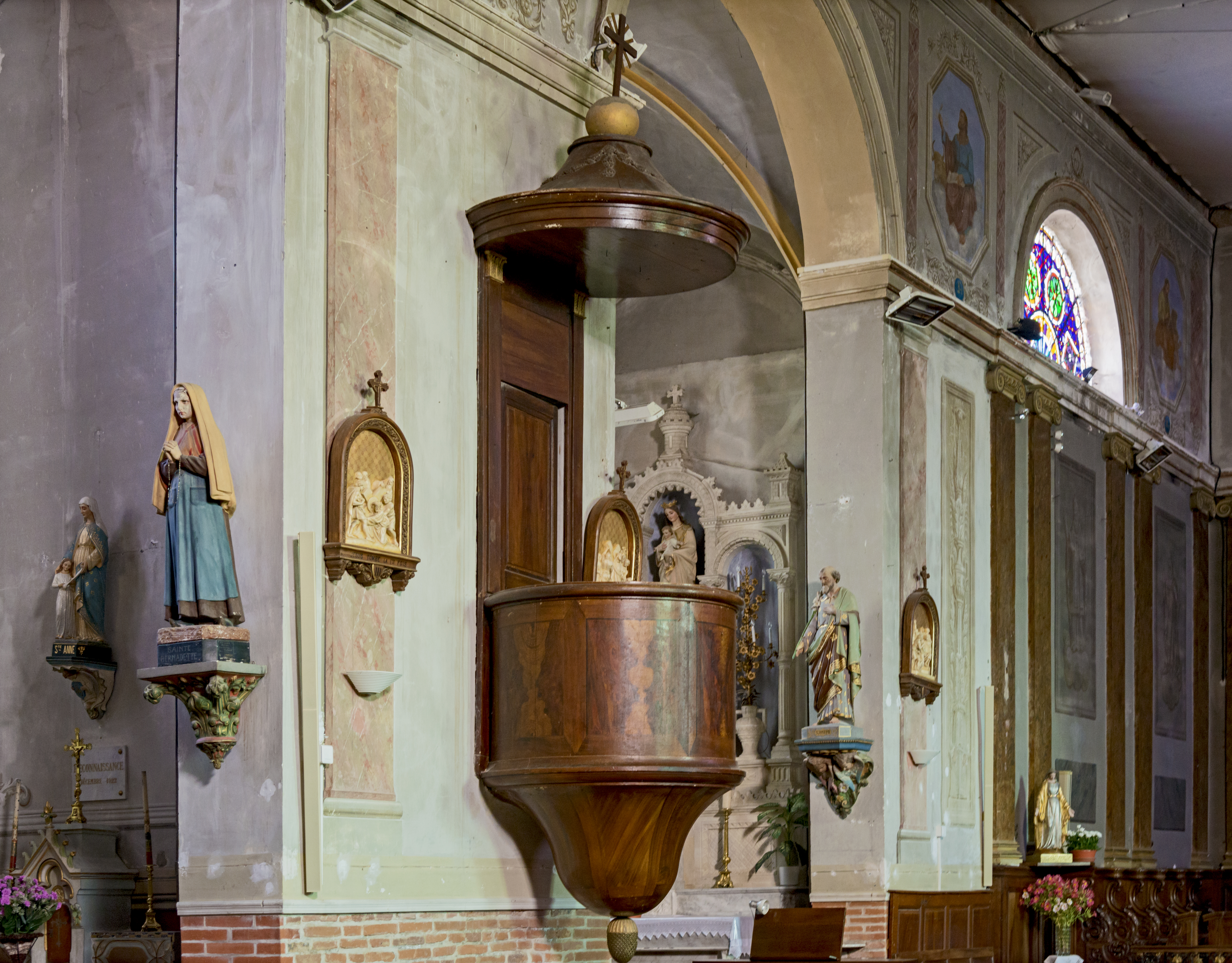
Pulpit

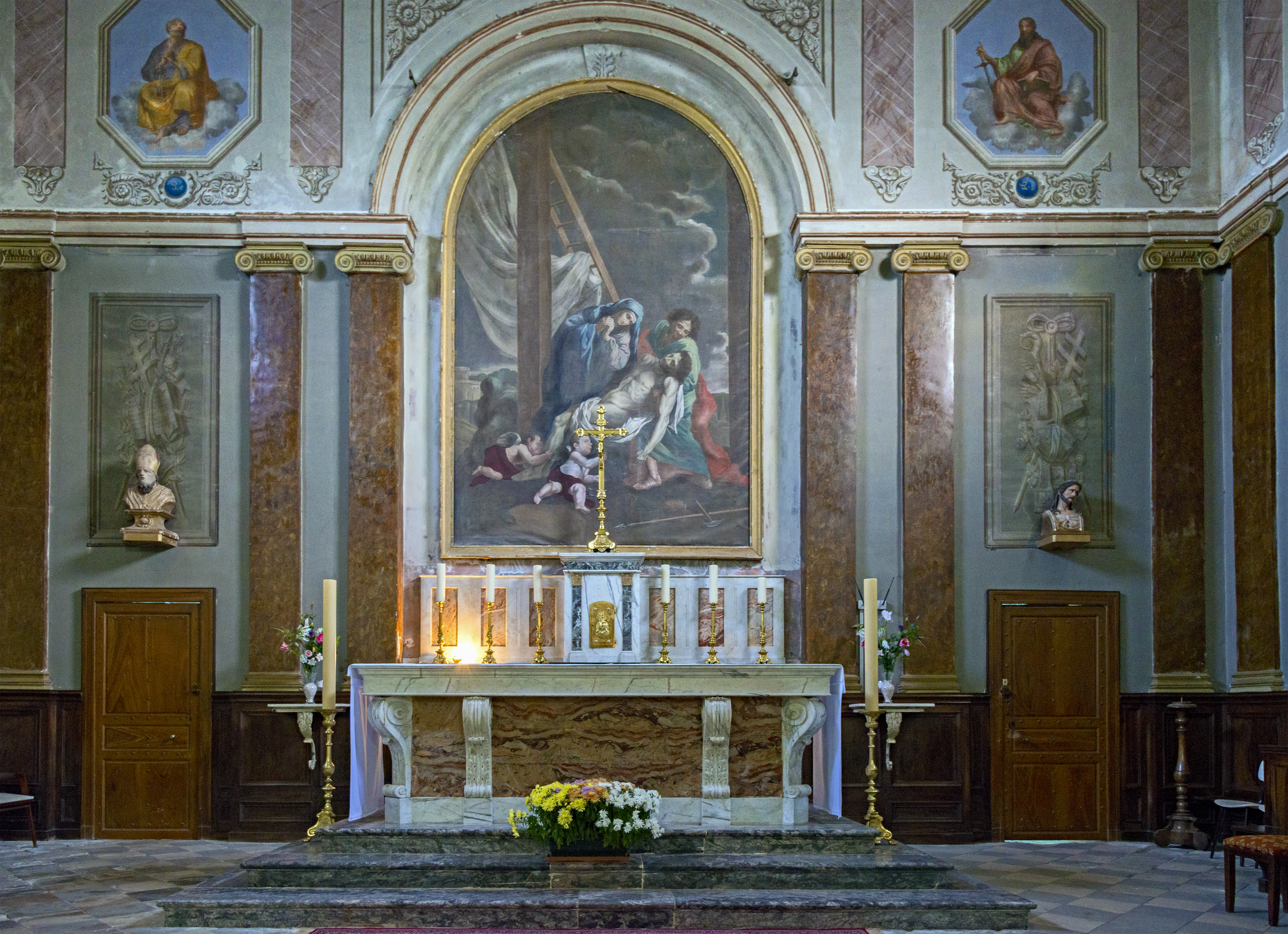
Altar

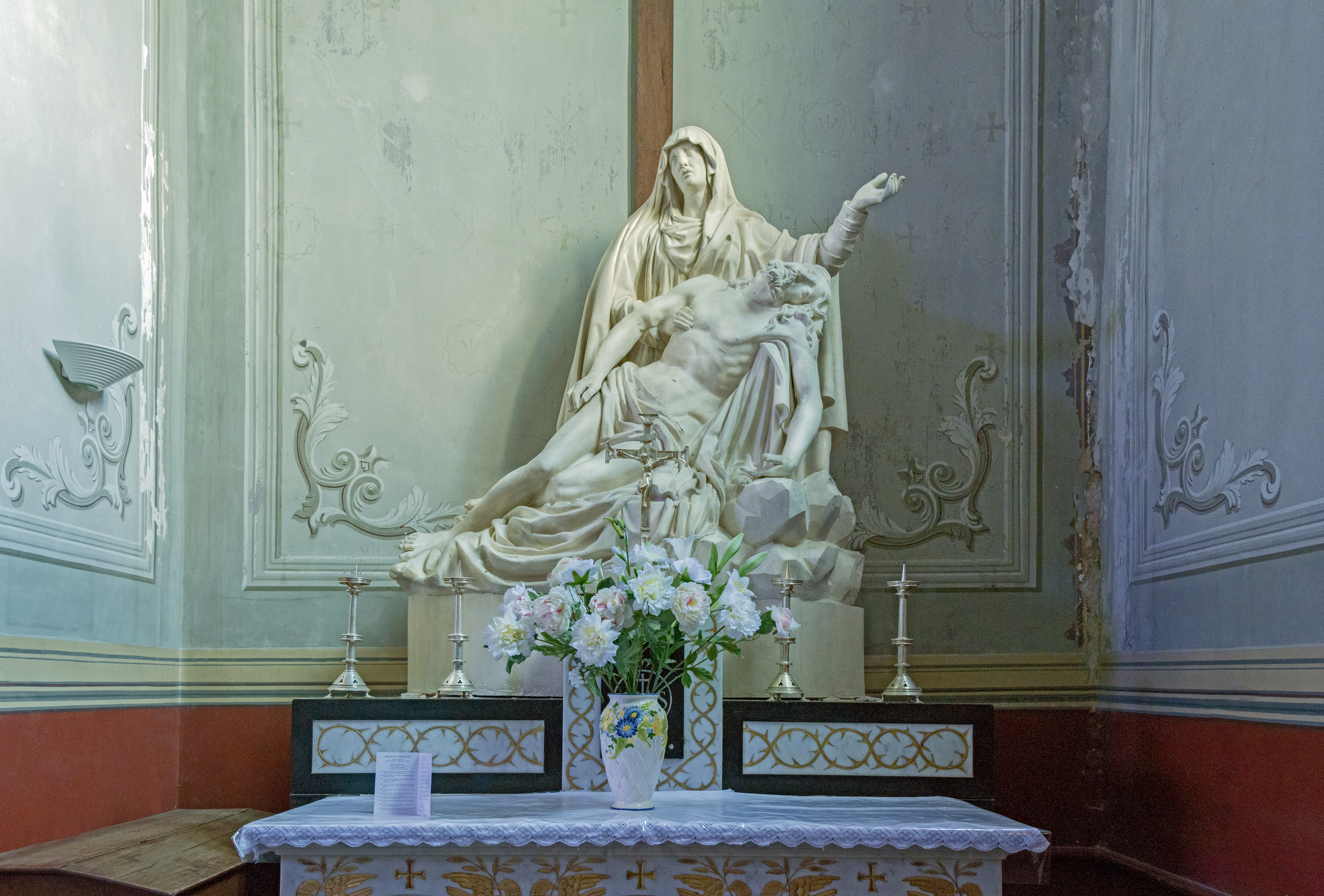

== See also ==
- Communes of the Haute-Garonne department
