= Mirepoix-sur-Tarn =

- Commune
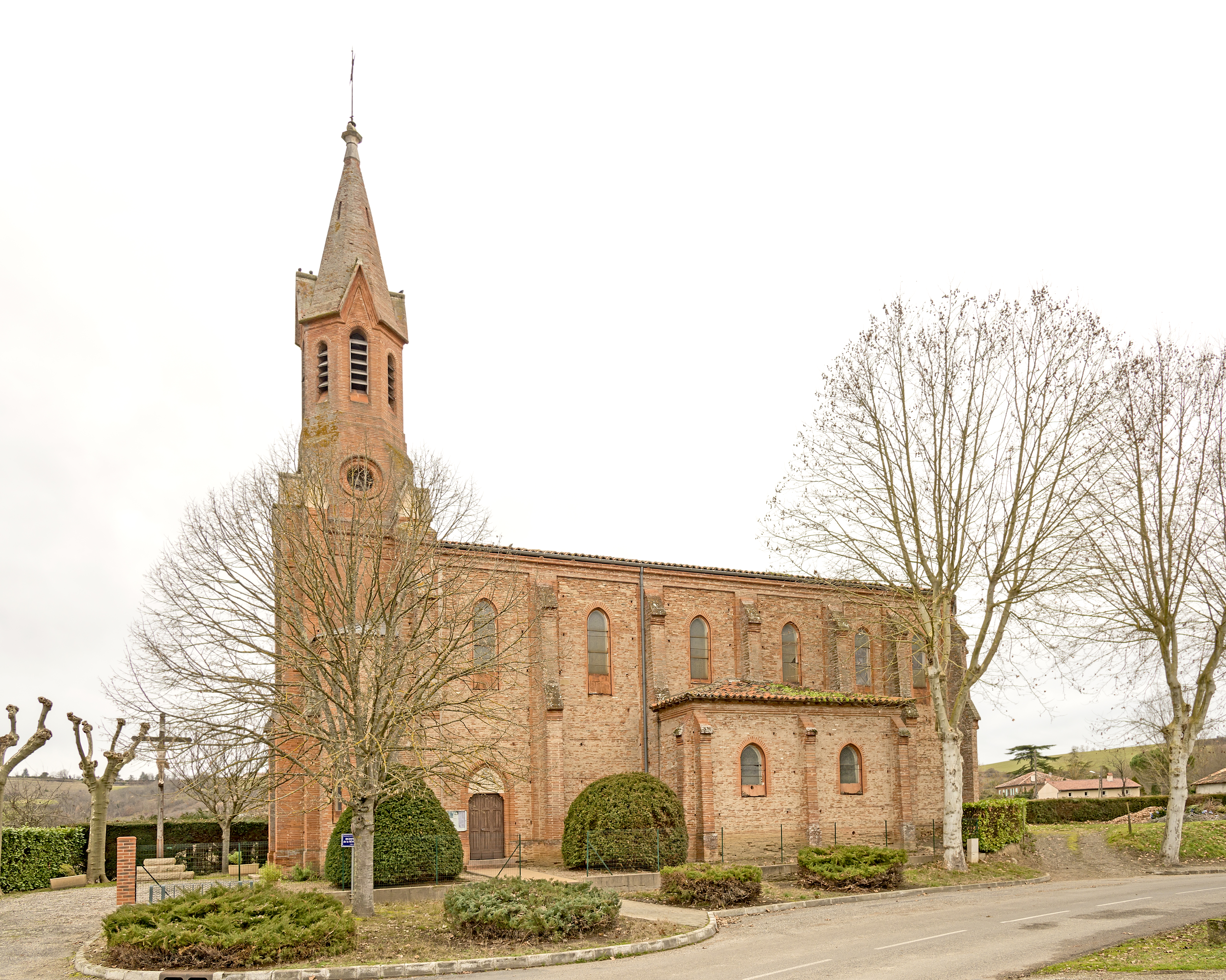
- The church in Mirepoix-sur-Tarn

- Coat of arms
- Location of Mirepoix-sur-Tarn
- Location within France Location within Occitanie
- Coordinates: 43°48′51″N 1°34′20″E
- Country: France
- Region: Occitania
- Department: Haute-Garonne
- Arrondissement: Toulouse
- Canton: Villemur-sur-Tarn
- Intercommunality: Val'Aïgo

Government
  - Mayor (2020–2026): Sonia Blanchard Essner
- Area^{1}: 5.46 km^{2} (2.11 sq mi)
- Elevation: 105 m (344 ft)
- Highest elevation: 221 m (725 ft)
- Lowest elevation: 85 m (279 ft)
- Population (2023): 1,139
  - Density: 209/km^{2} (540/sq mi)
- Time zone: UTC+01:00 (CET)
  - Summer (DST): UTC+02:00 (CEST)
- INSEE/Postal code: 31346 /31340
- ^{1} French Land Register data, which excludes lakes, ponds, glaciers > 1 km^{2} (0.386 sq mi or 247 acres) and river estuaries.

Mirepoix-sur-Tarn (French pronunciation: [miʁpwa syʁ taʁn]; Occitan: Mirapeis de Tarn) is a commune in the Haute-Garonne department in southwestern France.

== Population ==
Historical population
| Year | Pop. | ±% p.a. |
|---|---|---|
| 1968 | 340 | — |
| 1975 | 342 | +0.08% |
| 1982 | 399 | +2.23% |
| 1990 | 476 | +2.23% |
| 1999 | 537 | +1.35% |
| 2007 | 671 | +2.82% |
| 2012 | 721 | +1.45% |
| 2017 | 1,014 | +7.06% |
| 2023 | 1,139 | +1.96% |
Source: INSEE

== Sights ==
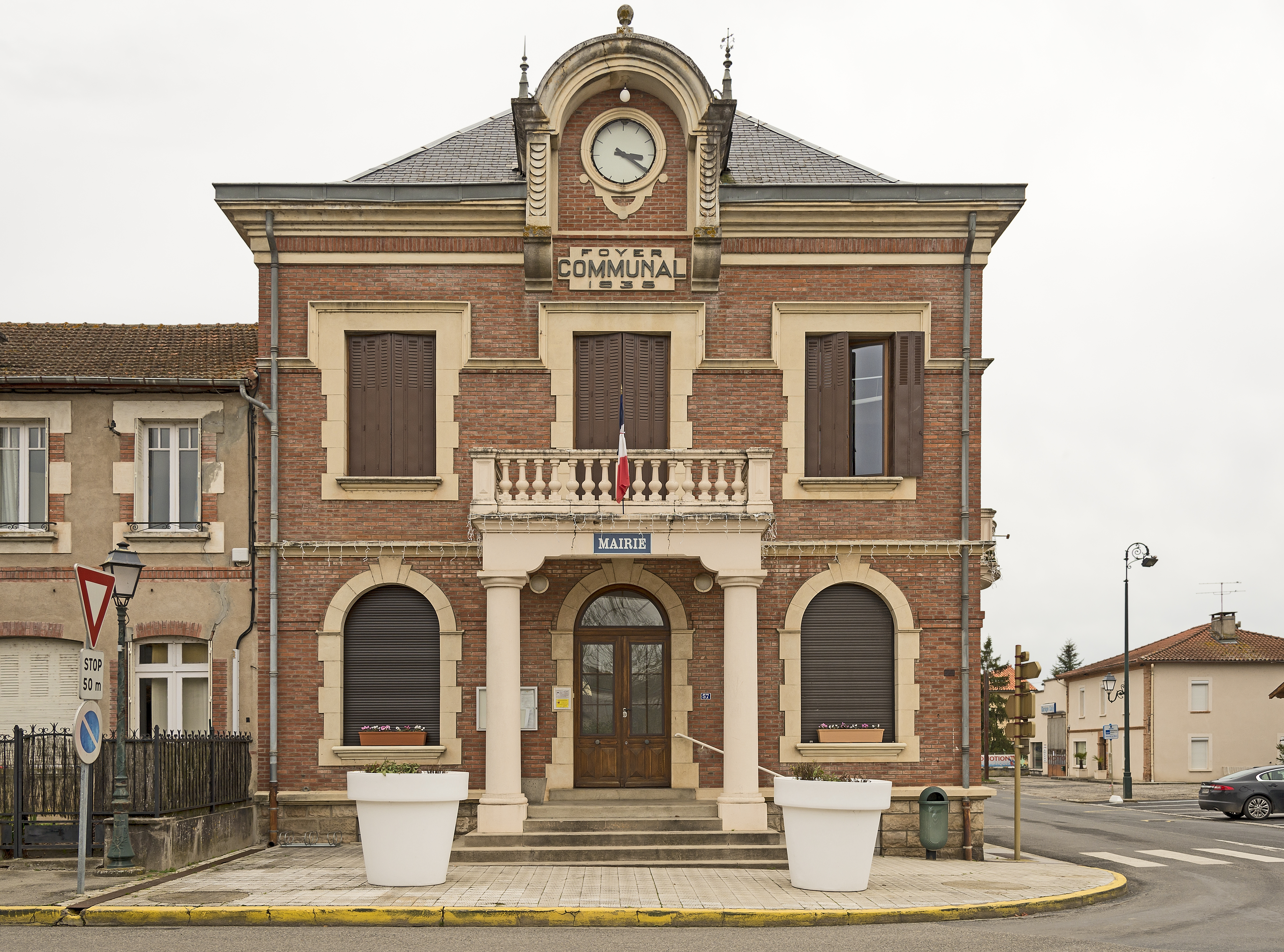
Town hall

== See also ==
- Communes of the Haute-Garonne department
