= Augustinian Convent (Toulouse) =

Convent in Haute-Garonne, France

Coordinates: 43°36′4″N 1°26′47″E

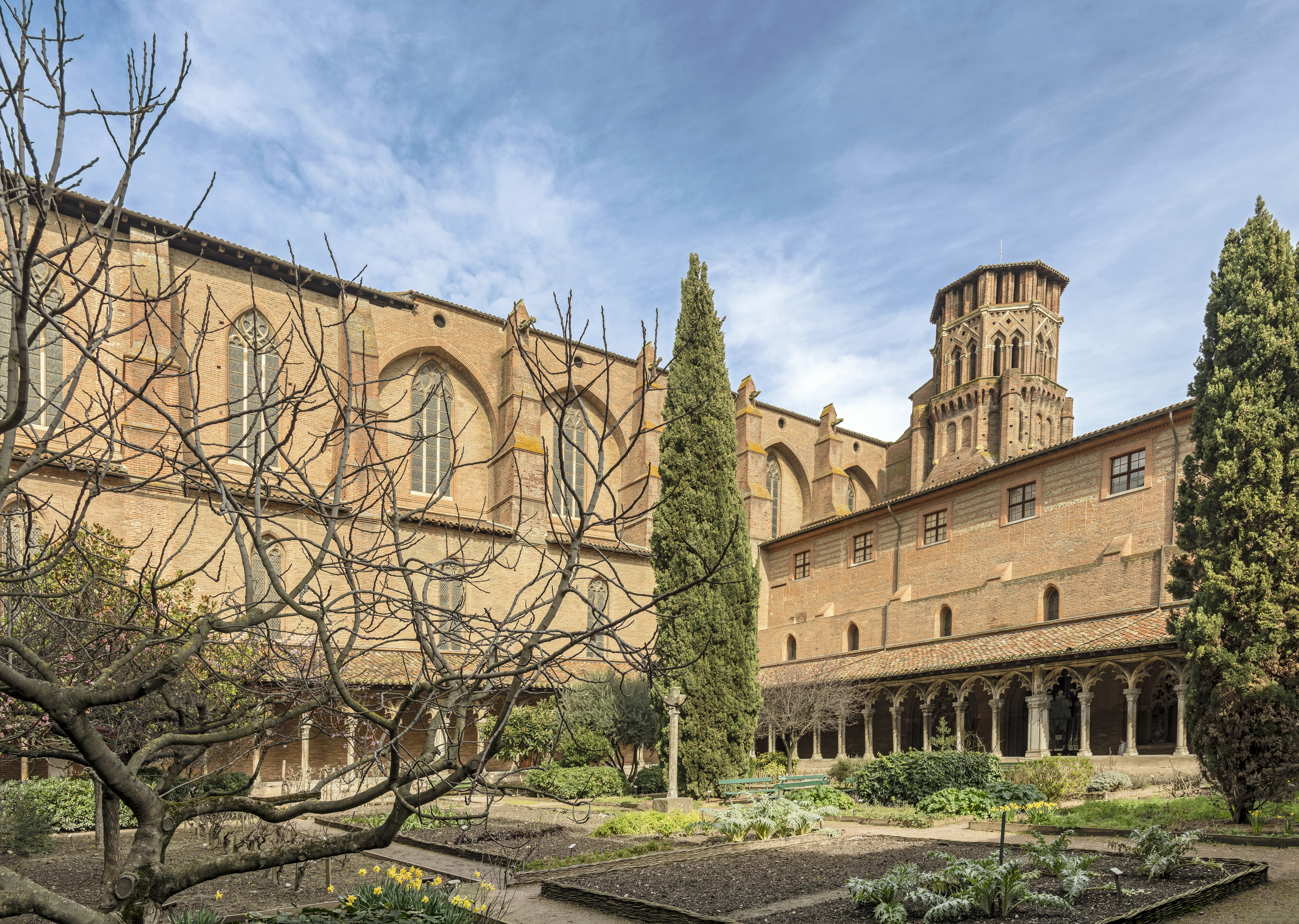
Cloister and bell tower of Augustinian convent from Toulouse

The Augustinian Convent of Toulouse was founded in 1286 for members of the Augustinian religious order. It was first established outside the city walls, near the Matabiau quarter, then, between 1310 and 1341 moved to the corner of rue du Musée and rue des Arts. In 1790 it ceased to be a convent. Today, its buildings house the Musée des Augustins.

== History ==
=== The construction of the convent ===
In 1269 a community of Hermits of St. Augustine was founded outside the city of Toulouse, near to the Montolieu quarter. The construction was due to the Chapter of Canons Regular of St. Sernin who undertook to build a convent in exchange for land and rights that newcomers granted them from the donations they had received. As frequently happens in the history of religious foundations, this initial location proved inadequate to the needs of the community.

In 1309–1310, the hermits of St. Augustine obtained the Pope's Clement V approval to sell this first building, and purchase the land to build the existing buildings that lie within the walls of the city, in the parish of Saint-Etienne. The canons of Saint-Sernin objected to the transfer, but, in 1326 sold three houses to the hermits for the price of 3500 guilders in exchange of a part of the wax sheets received by the Augustinians for a burial.

Jean Lobres, prime contractor of Toulouse's cathedral participated in the construction of the apse of the church.

The layout of the church is typical of the southern Mediterranean-Gothic style. The apse has three chapels that open directly onto the large, single nave, there is no transept, and in the upper parts, sections have been cut out.

By 1341 the foundations of the monastery were well established.

The completed church was painted in the style typical of northern Spain during the first half of the fourteenth century and decorated with miniatures produced in the royal court at the time of Philip IVth of France (Philip the Fair). The campanile is built on a square and close to the chorus. Access is via the opening which is now located in the vestry. The construction of the eastern part of monastery began in 1341. Construction of the other three parts of the building were only begun in 1396 by the mason Jean Maurin. Ninety years later, in 1396, the cloister was completed.

The convent's library held important manuscripts.

=== The fire of 1463 ===
Starting on 7 May 1463 and lasting for nearly two weeks, a fire (started by a careless baker) destroyed much of the city of Toulouse. As was the case at the Carmelite convent, most of the roof collapsed. With the help of the faithful and the church, reconstruction of the roof began in 1495 through the work of masons Martin Pujol and Pierre d'Arroye. The work was quickly completed and the building was rededicated on 30 June 1504.

=== The decline of the convent ===
Up until the fourteenth and fifteenth centuries the convent was home to two hundred monks. But then numbers started to decline; by 1518 there were no more than 140, and the fall continued. In 1649 there were only 60 and in 1680 there were only 31. By the time of the French Revolution only a few remained. In addition, in 1542, the convent was the victim of looting; many books and records were stolen from the library, along with liturgical objects and valuable furniture. On 14 September 1550 (the feast of the Exaltation of the Holy Cross), lightning struck the bell tower. The upper floors were destroyed, causing extensive damage in the surrounding area. This event marked the beginning of the decline of the monastery. The financial and material difficulties could not be overcome and the bell tower was never reconstructed, instead it was lowered by one floor.

In May 1562, in the aftermath of the revolt of the Huguenots, three Augustinians were flogged in public, apostatized, and married to three Augustinian nuns for having left their convent. During this time, all the Augustinian nuns (bar one) of Toulouse became part of the Protestant Reformation, and the house was donated to the Jesuits (the Chapel of the Black Penitents).

In a decree of 2 November 1789 the convent became a national asset, and was decommissioned during the suppression of the monastic orders in 1790. Since 27 August 1795 it has housed the Toulouse Museum of Art.

== See also ==
- Toulouse Art Museum
