= Rouffiac-Tolosan =

- Commune
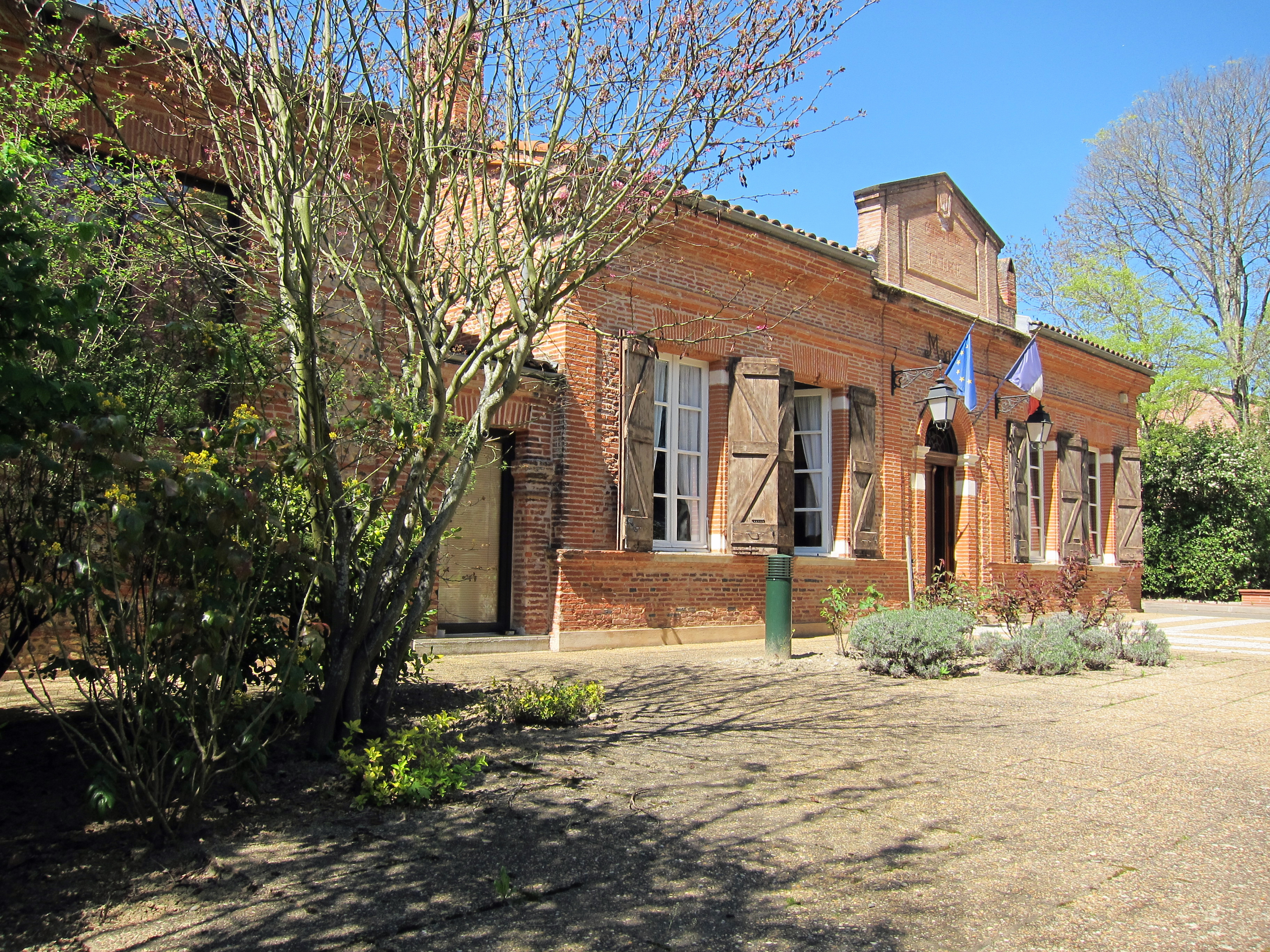
- Town hall

- Coat of arms
- Location of Rouffiac-Tolosan
- Location within France Location within Occitanie
- Coordinates: 43°39′54″N 1°31′32″E
- Country: France
- Region: Occitania
- Department: Haute-Garonne
- Arrondissement: Toulouse
- Canton: Pechbonnieu

Government
  - Mayor (2020–2026): Jean-Gervais Sourzac
- Area^{1}: 4.67 km^{2} (1.80 sq mi)
- Elevation: 210 m (690 ft)
- Highest elevation: 234 m (768 ft)
- Lowest elevation: 154 m (505 ft)
- Population (2023): 2,363
  - Density: 506/km^{2} (1,310/sq mi)
- Time zone: UTC+01:00 (CET)
  - Summer (DST): UTC+02:00 (CEST)
- INSEE/Postal code: 31462 /31180
- ^{1} French Land Register data, which excludes lakes, ponds, glaciers > 1 km^{2} (0.386 sq mi or 247 acres) and river estuaries.

Rouffiac-Tolosan (French pronunciation: [ʁufjak tɔlozɑ̃]; Occitan: Rofiac Tolosan) is a commune in the Haute-Garonne department in southwestern France.

== Population ==
Historical population
Year	Pop.	±% p.a.
1968	491	—
1975	626	+3.53%
1982	750	+2.62%
1990	961	+3.15%
1999	1,404	+4.30%
2007	1,681	+2.28%
2012	1,849	+1.92%
2017	1,944	+1.01%
2023	2,363	+3.31%
Source: INSEE

== See also ==
- Communes of the Haute-Garonne department
