= Saint Marcellus =

Saint Marcellus may refer to:

- Pope Marcellus I (255–309)
- Marcellus of Capua (c. 3rd or 4th century)
- Marcellus of Paris (died 436)
- Marcellus of Tangier (c. mid 3rd century–298)

== See also ==
- Marcel (disambiguation)
- Saint-Marcel (disambiguation)
- Saint-Marcellin (disambiguation)
