= Saint-Marcel =

Saint-Marcel may refer to:

== People ==
- Saint Marcellus of Paris, 9th bishop of Paris and namesake of a bell of Notre-Dame de Paris
- Clair du Dauphiné, Catholic French priest.

== Places ==
=== Canada ===
- Saint-Marcel, Quebec, a municipality in Quebec located in the MRC de L'Islet in the Chaudière-Appalaches
- Saint-Marcel-de-Richelieu, a municipality in southwestern Quebec, Canada in the Regional County Municipality of Les Maskoutains

=== France ===
- Saint-Marcel, Ain, in the Ain département
- Saint-Marcel, Ardennes, in the Ardennes département
- Saint-Marcel, Eure, in the Eure département
- Saint-Marcel, Indre, in the Indre département
- Saint-Marcel, Meurthe-et-Moselle, in the Meurthe-et-Moselle département
- Saint-Marcel, Morbihan, in the Morbihan département
- Saint-Marcel, Haute-Saône, in the Haute-Saône département
- Saint-Marcel, Saône-et-Loire, in the Saône-et-Loire département
- Saint-Marcel, Savoie, in the Savoie département
- Saint-Marcel-Bel-Accueil, in the Isère département
- Saint-Marcel-Campes, in the Tarn département
- Saint-Marcel-d'Ardèche, in the Ardèche département
- Saint-Marcel-de-Careiret, in the Gard département
- Saint-Marcel-de-Félines, in the Loire département
- Saint-Marcel-du-Périgord, in the Dordogne département
- Saint-Marcel-d'Urfé, in the Loire département
- Saint-Marcel-en-Marcillat, in the Allier département
- Saint-Marcel-en-Murat, in the Allier département
- Saint-Marcel-l'Éclairé, in the Rhône département
- Saint-Marcel-lès-Annonay, in the Ardèche département
- Saint-Marcel-lès-Sauzet, in the Drôme département
- Saint-Marcel-lès-Valence, in the Drôme département
- Saint-Marcel-Paulel, in the Haute-Garonne département
- Saint-Marcel-sur-Aude, in the Aude département
- Saint-Marcel station, a station of the Paris Metro, serving line 5.

=== Italy ===
- Saint-Marcel, Aosta Valley, a municipality in the Aosta Valley region of north-western Italy

== See also ==
- Marcel (disambiguation)
- Saint-Marcellin (disambiguation)
- Saint Marcellus (disambiguation)
