= Saint-Geniès =

Saint-Geniès may refer to several communes in France:

- Saint-Geniès, Dordogne, in the Dordogne department
- Saint-Geniès-Bellevue, in the Haute-Garonne department
- Saint-Geniès-de-Comolas, in the Gard department
- Saint-Geniès-de-Fontedit, in the Hérault department
- Saint-Geniès-de-Malgoirès, in the Gard department
- Saint-Geniès-de-Varensal, in the Hérault department
- Saint-Geniès-des-Mourgues, in the Hérault department
