= Paulhac, Haute-Garonne =

Paulhac
- Commune
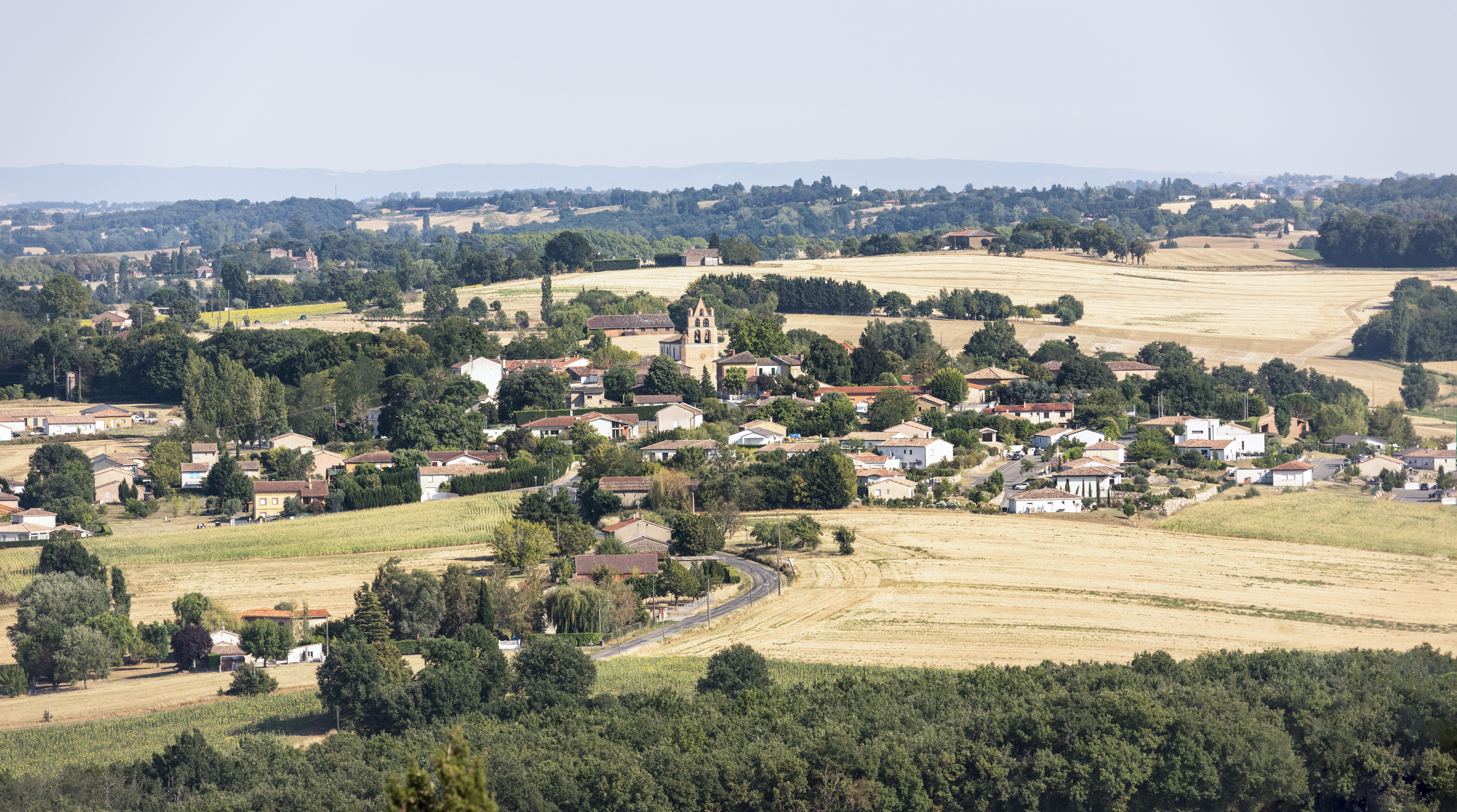
- Location of Paulhac
- Location within France Location within Occitanie
- Coordinates: 43°45′23″N 1°33′24″E
- Country: France
- Region: Occitania
- Department: Haute-Garonne
- Arrondissement: Toulouse
- Canton: Pechbonnieu
- Intercommunality: Coteaux du Girou

Government
  - Mayor (2024–2026): Nathalie Rumeau
- Area^{1}: 14.03 km^{2} (5.42 sq mi)
- Elevation: 175 m (574 ft)
- Highest elevation: 225 m (738 ft)
- Lowest elevation: 110 m (360 ft)
- Population (2023): 1,256
  - Density: 89.52/km^{2} (231.9/sq mi)
- Time zone: UTC+01:00 (CET)
  - Summer (DST): UTC+02:00 (CEST)
- INSEE/Postal code: 31407 /31380
- ^{1} French Land Register data, which excludes lakes, ponds, glaciers > 1 km^{2} (0.386 sq mi or 247 acres) and river estuaries.

Paulhac (French pronunciation: [pojak]; Occitan: Paulhac) is a commune in the Haute-Garonne department in southwestern France.

== Population ==
Historical population
Year	Pop.	±% p.a.
1968	416	—
1975	458	+1.38%
1982	577	+3.35%
1990	684	+2.15%
1999	916	+3.30%
2007	1,107	+2.40%
2012	1,169	+1.10%
2017	1,236	+1.12%
2023	1,256	+0.27%
Source: INSEE

The inhabitants of the commune are known as Paulhacois in French.

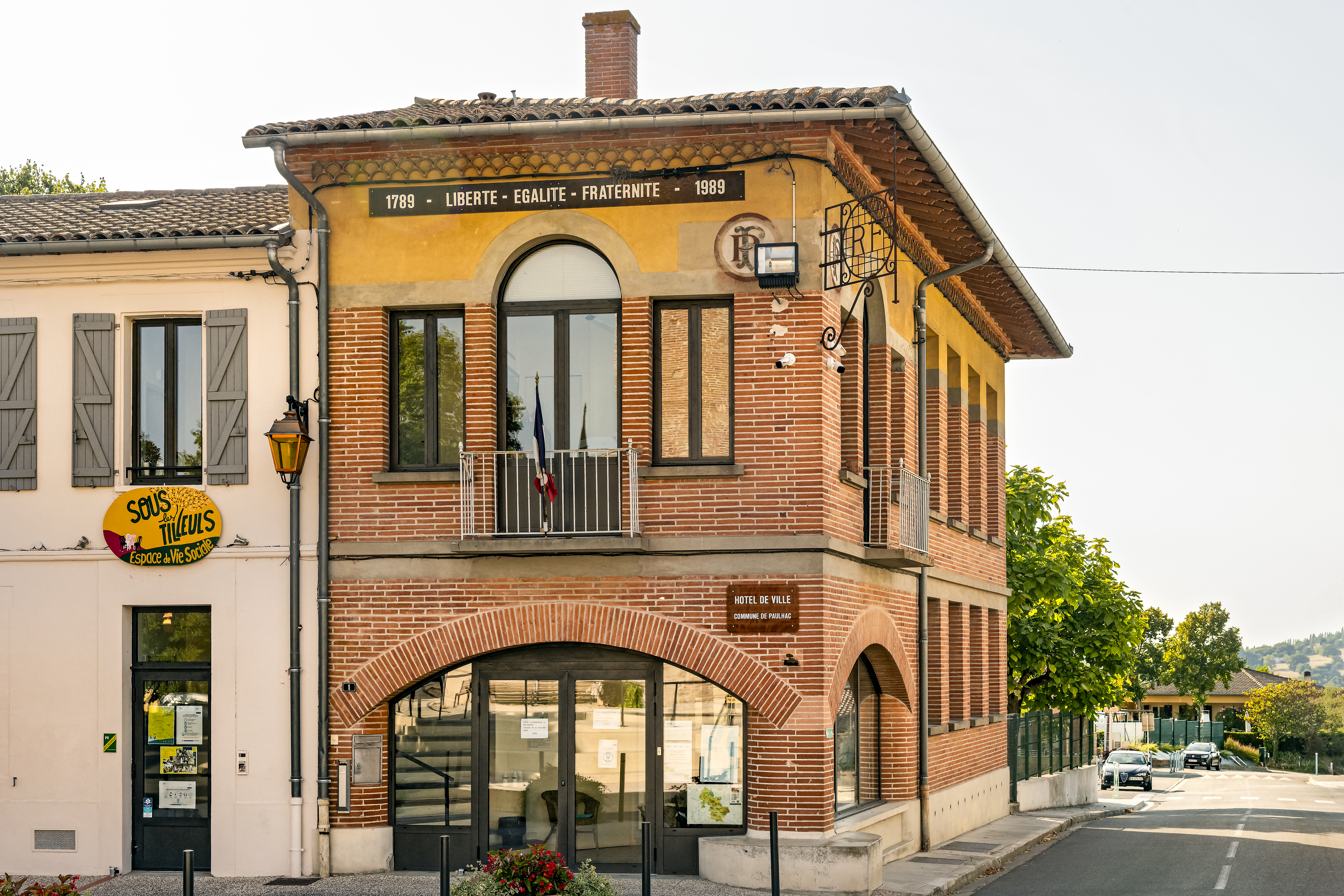
Town hall

== See also ==
- Communes of the Haute-Garonne department
