= Bonrepos-Riquet =

- Commune
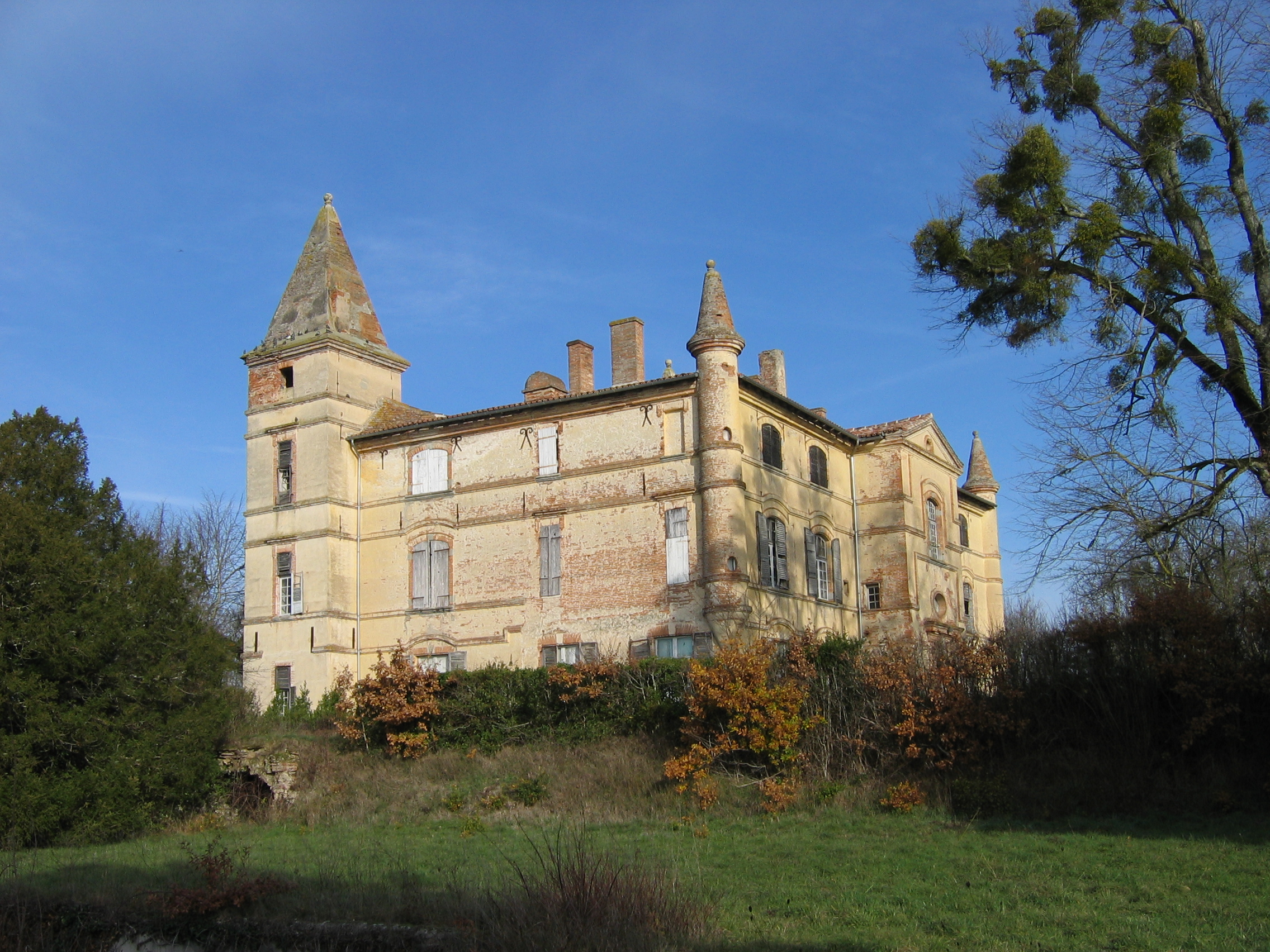
- Chateau

- Coat of arms
- Location of Bonrepos-Riquet
- Location within France Location within Occitanie
- Coordinates: 43°40′39″N 1°37′28″E
- Country: France
- Region: Occitania
- Department: Haute-Garonne
- Arrondissement: Toulouse
- Canton: Pechbonnieu

Government
  - Mayor (2020–2026): Philippe Seilles
- Area^{1}: 5.69 km^{2} (2.20 sq mi)
- Elevation: 200 m (660 ft)
- Highest elevation: 253 m (830 ft)
- Lowest elevation: 142 m (466 ft)
- Population (2023): 324
  - Density: 56.9/km^{2} (147/sq mi)
- Time zone: UTC+01:00 (CET)
  - Summer (DST): UTC+02:00 (CEST)
- INSEE/Postal code: 31074 /31590
- ^{1} French Land Register data, which excludes lakes, ponds, glaciers > 1 km^{2} (0.386 sq mi or 247 acres) and river estuaries.

Bonrepos-Riquet (French pronunciation: [bɔ̃ʁəpo ʁikɛ]; Languedocien: Bonrepaus Riquet) is a commune in the Haute-Garonne department in southwestern France.

== Population ==
The inhabitants of the commune are known as Riquetois.

Historical population
Year	Pop.	±% p.a.
1968	153	—
1975	140	−1.26%
1982	158	+1.74%
1990	195	+2.66%
1999	247	+2.66%
2007	227	−1.05%
2012	253	+2.19%
2017	293	+2.98%
2023	324	+1.69%
Source: INSEE

== See also ==
- Communes of the Haute-Garonne department
