= Montpitol =

- Commune
- Coat of arms
- Location of Montpitol
- Location within France Location within Occitanie
- Coordinates: 43°42′19″N 1°39′00″E
- Country: France
- Region: Occitania
- Department: Haute-Garonne
- Arrondissement: Toulouse
- Canton: Pechbonnieu
- Intercommunality: Coteaux du Girou

Government
  - Mayor (2020–2026): Jean-François Casale
- Area^{1}: 5.96 km^{2} (2.30 sq mi)
- Elevation: 215 m (705 ft)
- Highest elevation: 233 m (764 ft)
- Lowest elevation: 155 m (509 ft)
- Population (2023): 335
  - Density: 56.2/km^{2} (146/sq mi)
- Time zone: UTC+01:00 (CET)
  - Summer (DST): UTC+02:00 (CEST)
- INSEE/Postal code: 31388 /31380
- ^{1} French Land Register data, which excludes lakes, ponds, glaciers > 1 km^{2} (0.386 sq mi or 247 acres) and river estuaries.

Montpitol (French pronunciation: [mɔ̃pitɔl]; Occitan: Montpitòl) is a commune in the Haute-Garonne department of southwestern France.

== Population ==
Historical population
Year	Pop.	±% p.a.
1968	141	—
1975	121	−2.16%
1982	176	+5.50%
1990	251	+4.54%
1999	332	+3.16%
2007	381	+1.74%
2012	409	+1.43%
2017	387	−1.10%
2023	335	−2.38%
Source: INSEE

The inhabitants of the commune are known as Montpitolois and Montpitoloises in French.

== See also ==
- Communes of the Haute-Garonne department
