= Saint-Pierre, Haute-Garonne =

Saint-Pierre
- Commune
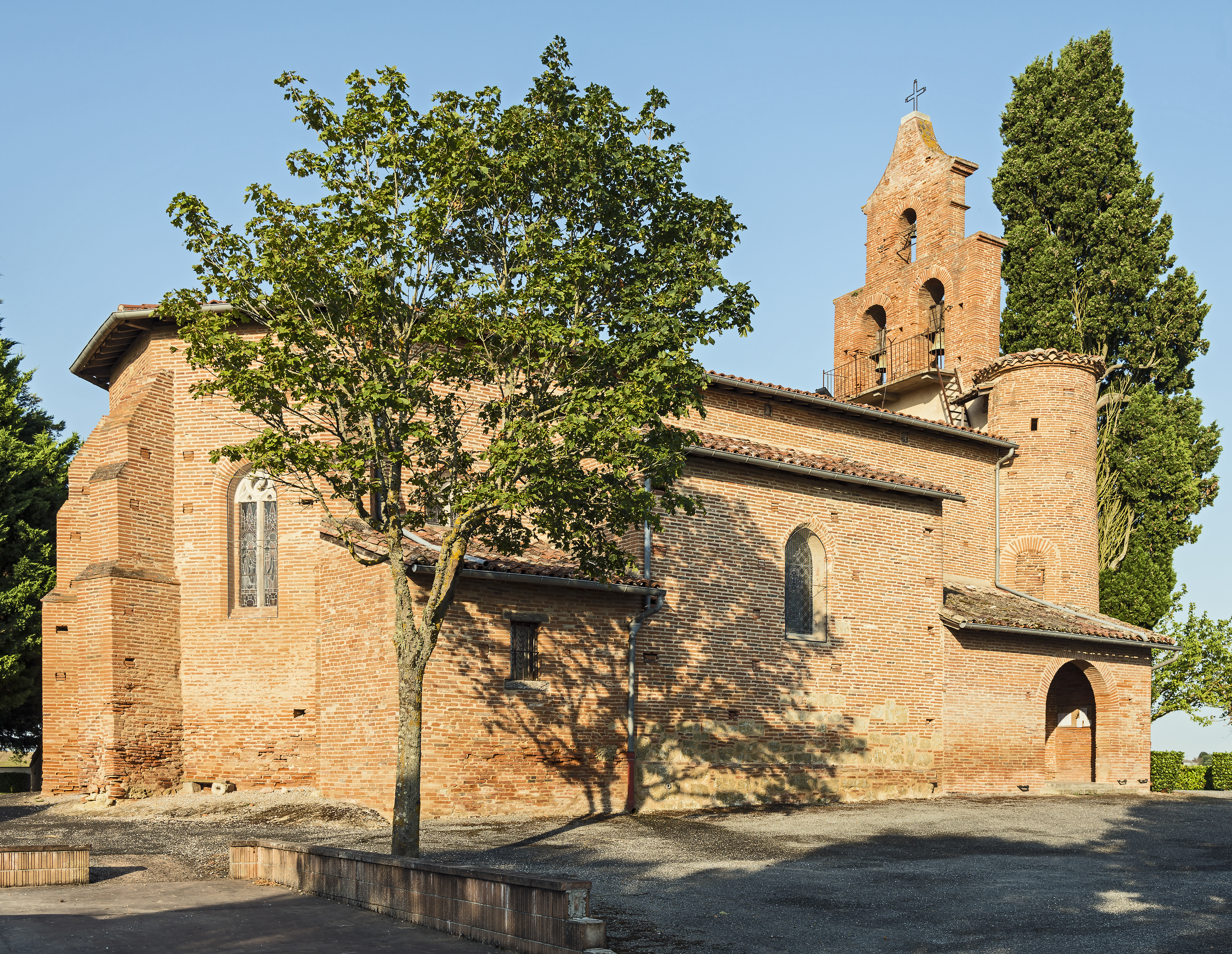
- The church in Saint-Pierre

- Coat of arms
- Location of Saint-Pierre
- Location within France Location within Occitanie
- Coordinates: 43°37′56″N 1°39′03″E
- Country: France
- Region: Occitania
- Department: Haute-Garonne
- Arrondissement: Toulouse
- Canton: Pechbonnieu
- Intercommunality: Coteaux du Girou

Government
  - Mayor (2020–2026): Pierrette Jarnole
- Area^{1}: 4.74 km^{2} (1.83 sq mi)
- Elevation: 218 m (715 ft)
- Highest elevation: 232 m (761 ft)
- Lowest elevation: 150 m (490 ft)
- Population (2023): 268
  - Density: 56.5/km^{2} (146/sq mi)
- Time zone: UTC+01:00 (CET)
  - Summer (DST): UTC+02:00 (CEST)
- INSEE/Postal code: 31511 /31590
- ^{1} French Land Register data, which excludes lakes, ponds, glaciers > 1 km^{2} (0.386 sq mi or 247 acres) and river estuaries.

Saint-Pierre (French pronunciation: [sɛ̃ pjɛʁ]; Languedocien: Sent Pèire) is a commune in the Haute-Garonne department in southwestern France.

== Population ==
Historical population
Year	Pop.	±% p.a.
1968	134	—
1975	115	−2.16%
1982	135	+2.32%
1990	201	+5.10%
1999	209	+0.43%
2007	250	+2.26%
2012	262	+0.94%
2017	239	−1.82%
2023	268	+1.93%
Source: INSEE

The inhabitants of the commune are called Saint-Pierrains in French.

== Monuments ==
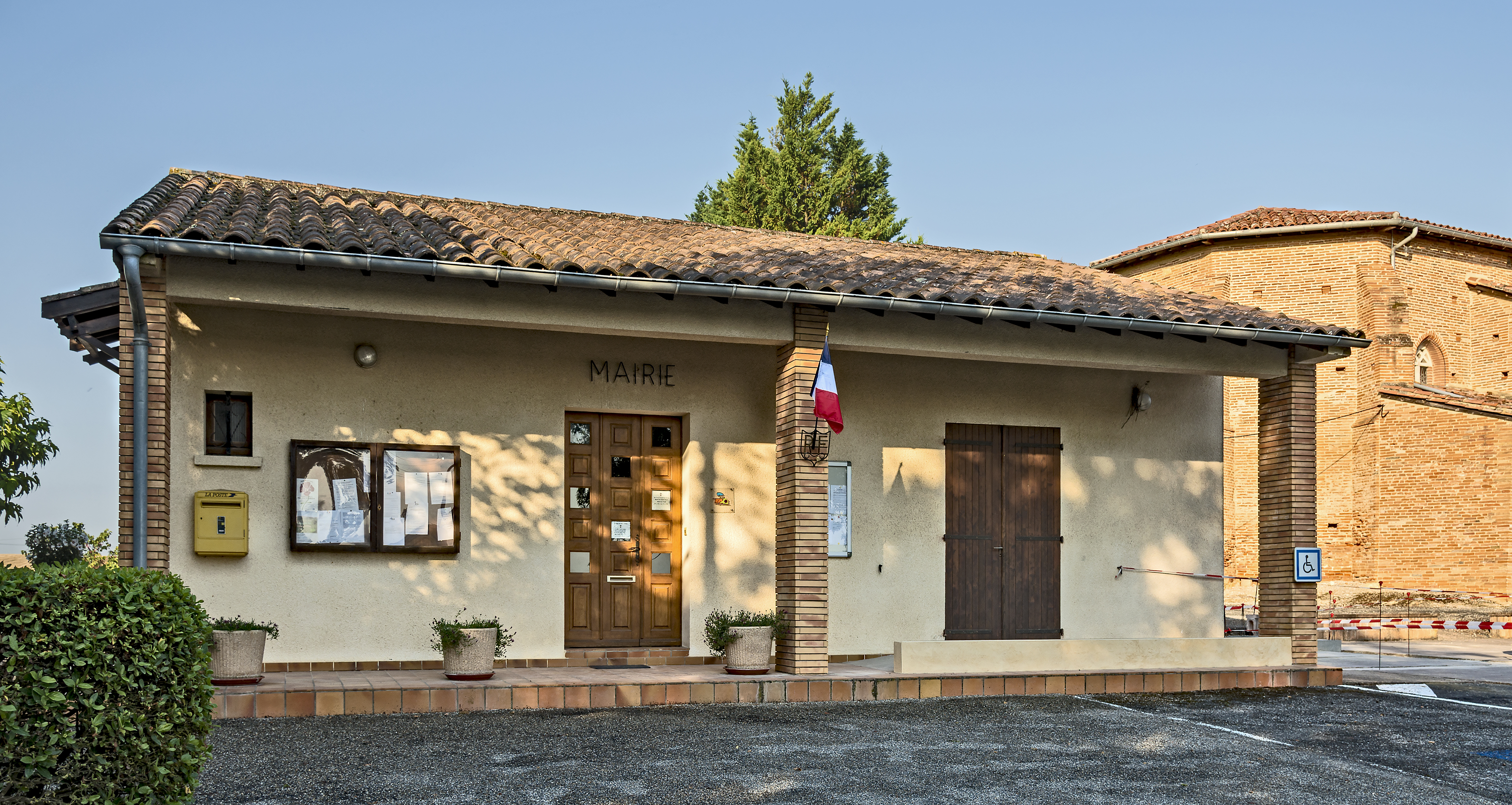
Town hall

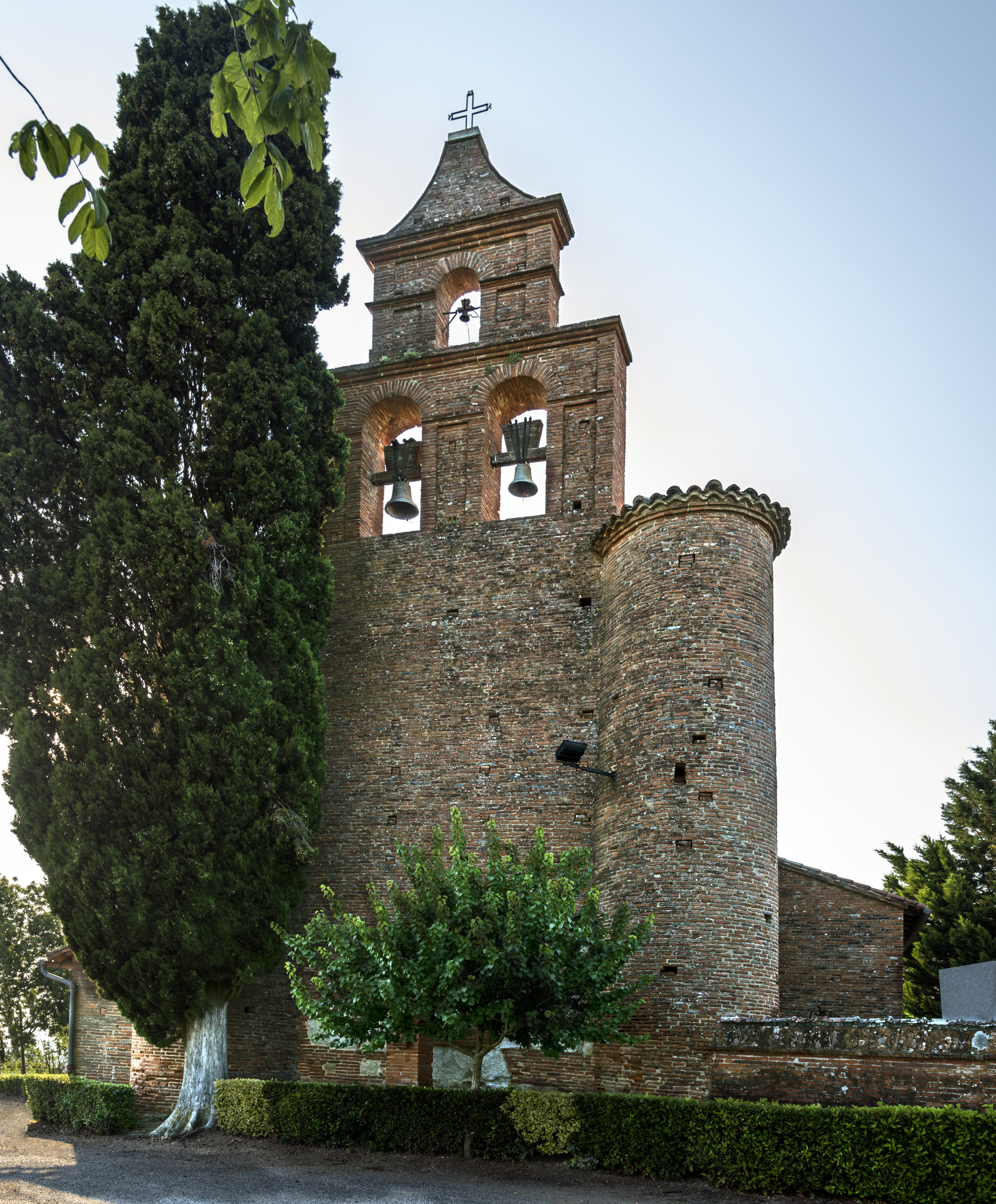
Church st.-Martin bell gable

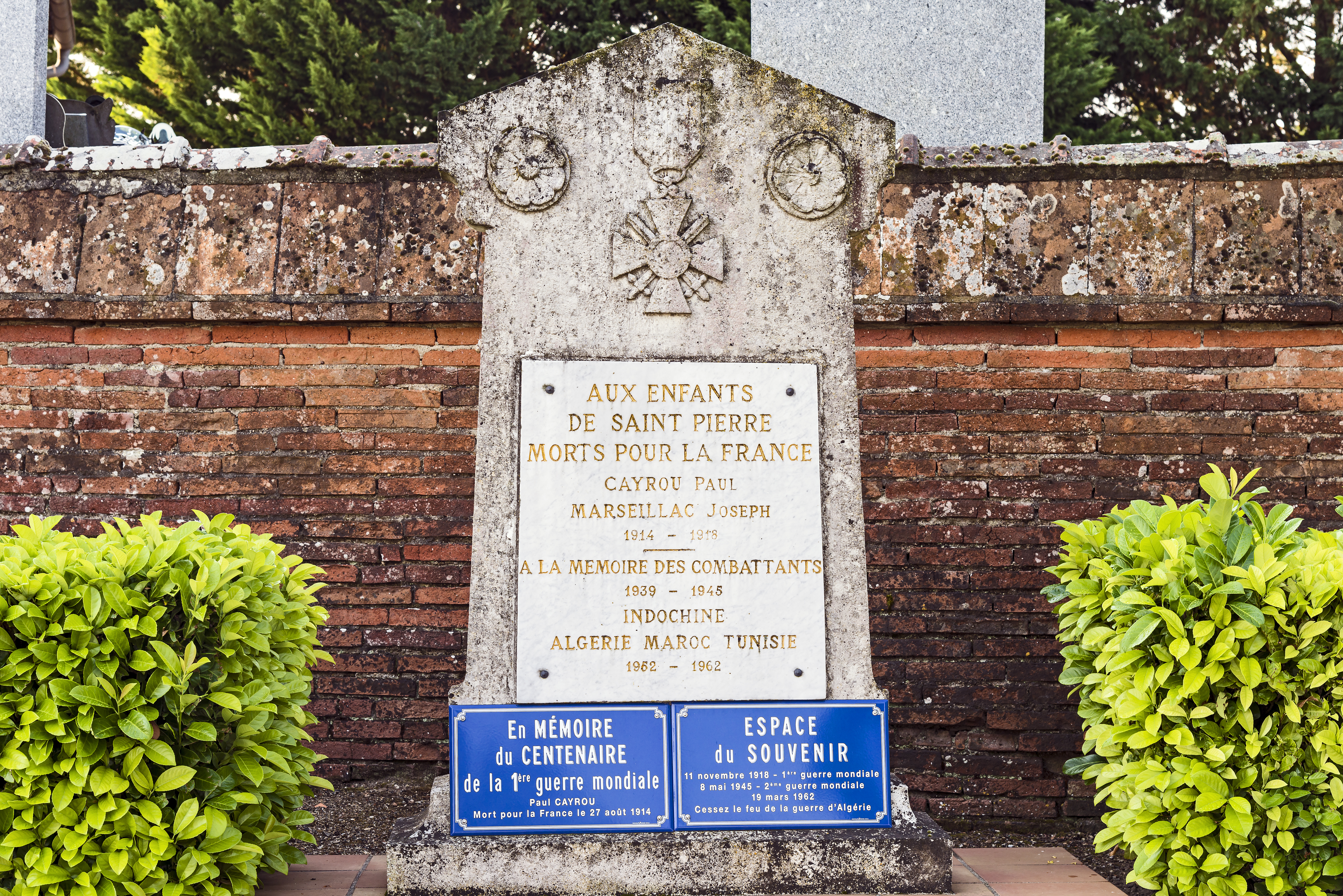
War memorial

== See also ==
- Communes of the Haute-Garonne department
