= Canton of Pechbonnieu =

Coordinates: 43.71°N 1.46°E

The canton of Pechbonnieu is an administrative division of the Haute-Garonne department, southern France. It was created at the French canton reorganisation which came into effect in March 2015. Its seat is in Pechbonnieu.

It consists of the following communes:

1. Azas
2. Bazus
3. Bonrepos-Riquet
4. Castelmaurou
5. Garidech
6. Gauré
7. Gémil
8. Gragnague
9. Labastide-Saint-Sernin
10. Lapeyrouse-Fossat
11. Lavalette
12. Montastruc-la-Conseillère
13. Montberon
14. Montjoire
15. Montpitol
16. Paulhac
17. Pechbonnieu
18. Roquesérière
19. Rouffiac-Tolosan
20. Saint-Geniès-Bellevue
21. Saint-Jean-Lherm
22. Saint-Loup-Cammas
23. Saint-Marcel-Paulel
24. Saint-Pierre
25. Verfeil
26. Villariès
