= Azas =

- Commune
- Coat of arms
- Location of Azas
- Location within France Location within Occitanie
- Coordinates: 43°43′34″N 1°40′28″E
- Country: France
- Region: Occitania
- Department: Haute-Garonne
- Arrondissement: Toulouse
- Canton: Pechbonnieu
- Intercommunality: CC Tarn-Agout

Government
  - Mayor (2021–2026): Laurent Lacourt
- Area^{1}: 12.83 km^{2} (4.95 sq mi)
- Elevation: 202 m (663 ft)
- Highest elevation: 233 m (764 ft)
- Lowest elevation: 133 m (436 ft)
- Population (2023): 675
  - Density: 52.6/km^{2} (136/sq mi)
- Time zone: UTC+01:00 (CET)
  - Summer (DST): UTC+02:00 (CEST)
- INSEE/Postal code: 31038 /31380
- Website: mairie-azas.fr
- ^{1} French Land Register data, which excludes lakes, ponds, glaciers > 1 km^{2} (0.386 sq mi or 247 acres) and river estuaries.

Azas is a commune in the Haute-Garonne department in southwestern France.

== Population ==
Historical population
Year	Pop.	±% p.a.
1968	279	—
1975	254	−1.33%
1982	306	+2.70%
1990	351	+1.73%
1999	402	+1.52%
2007	473	+2.05%
2012	581	+4.20%
2017	664	+2.71%
2023	675	+0.27%
Source: INSEE

The inhabitants of the commune are known as Azassiens in French.

== See also ==
- Communes of the Haute-Garonne department
