= Montjoire =

- Commune
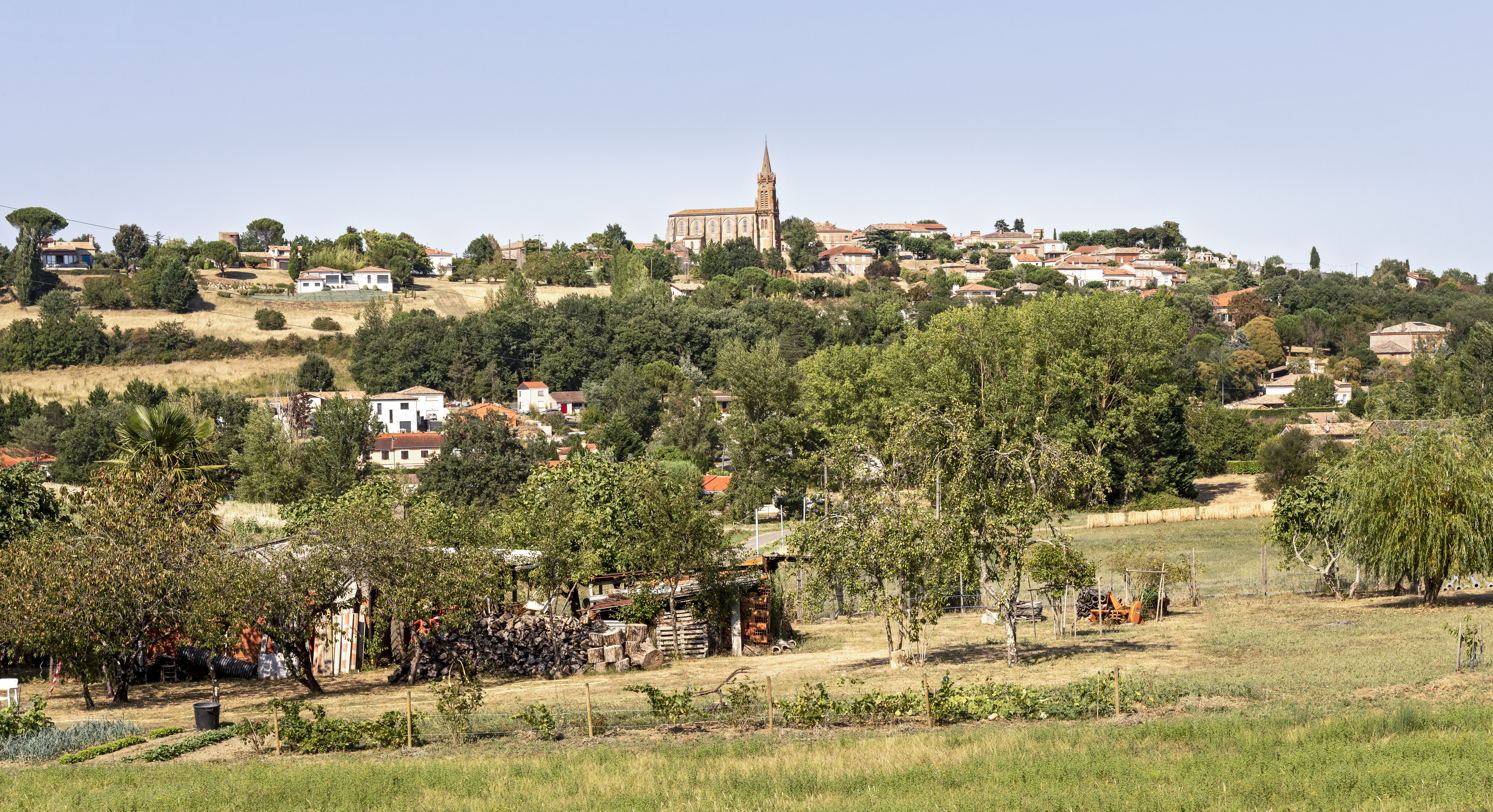

- Coat of arms
- Location of Montjoire
- Location within France Location within Occitanie
- Coordinates: 43°46′16″N 1°32′03″E
- Country: France
- Region: Occitania
- Department: Haute-Garonne
- Arrondissement: Toulouse
- Canton: Pechbonnieu
- Intercommunality: Coteaux du Girou

Government
  - Mayor (2020–2026): Isabelle Gousmar
- Area^{1}: 20.29 km^{2} (7.83 sq mi)
- Highest elevation: 235 m (771 ft)
- Lowest elevation: 114 m (374 ft)
- Population (2023): 1,243
  - Density: 61.26/km^{2} (158.7/sq mi)
- Time zone: UTC+01:00 (CET)
  - Summer (DST): UTC+02:00 (CEST)
- INSEE/Postal code: 31383 /31380
- ^{1} French Land Register data, which excludes lakes, ponds, glaciers > 1 km^{2} (0.386 sq mi or 247 acres) and river estuaries.

Montjoire (French pronunciation: [mɔ̃ʒwaʁ]; Occitan: Montjòire) is a commune in the Haute-Garonne department of southwestern France.

== Population ==
Historical population
Year	Pop.	±% p.a.
1968	530	—
1975	633	+2.57%
1982	843	+4.18%
1990	918	+1.07%
1999	1,018	+1.16%
2007	1,139	+1.41%
2012	1,249	+1.86%
2017	1,274	+0.40%
2023	1,243	−0.41%
Source: INSEE

The inhabitants of the commune are known as Montjoviens.

== See also ==
- Communes of the Haute-Garonne department
