= Bazus =

- Commune
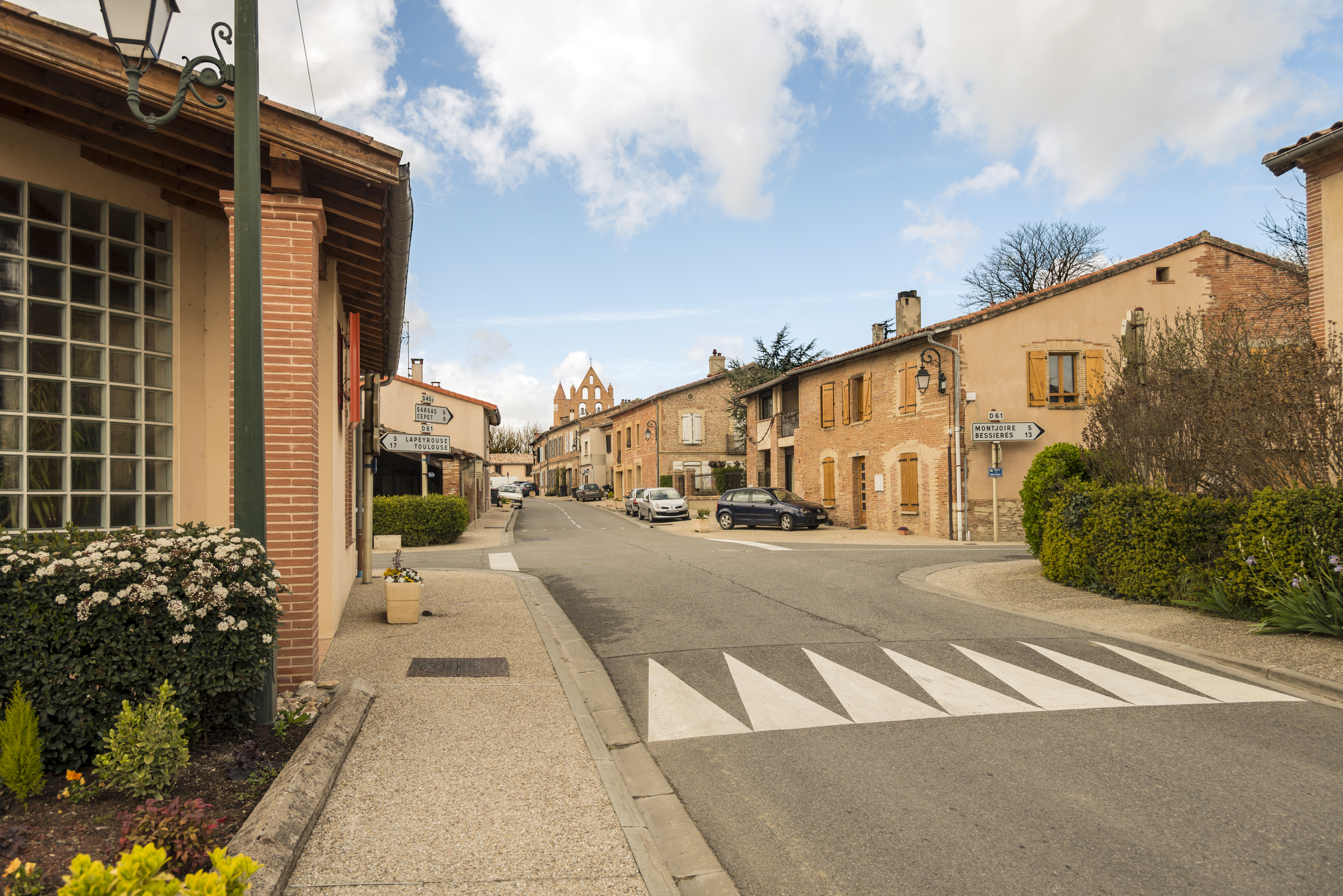
- A view within Bazus

- Coat of arms
- Location of Bazus
- Location within France Location within Occitanie
- Coordinates: 43°44′11″N 1°31′06″E
- Country: France
- Region: Occitania
- Department: Haute-Garonne
- Arrondissement: Toulouse
- Canton: Pechbonnieu
- Intercommunality: Coteaux du Girou

Government
  - Mayor (2020–2026): Brigitte Viviane Galy
- Area^{1}: 9.13 km^{2} (3.53 sq mi)
- Elevation: 165 m (541 ft)
- Highest elevation: 216 m (709 ft)
- Lowest elevation: 128 m (420 ft)
- Population (2023): 603
  - Density: 66.0/km^{2} (171/sq mi)
- Time zone: UTC+01:00 (CET)
  - Summer (DST): UTC+02:00 (CEST)
- INSEE/Postal code: 31049 /31380
- ^{1} French Land Register data, which excludes lakes, ponds, glaciers > 1 km^{2} (0.386 sq mi or 247 acres) and river estuaries.

Bazus (French pronunciation: [bazys]; Occitan: Basús) is a commune in the Haute-Garonne department in southwestern France.

== Population ==
Historical population
Year	Pop.	±% p.a.
1968	252	—
1975	289	+1.98%
1982	372	+3.67%
1990	437	+2.03%
1999	532	+2.21%
2007	588	+1.26%
2012	581	−0.24%
2017	553	−0.98%
2023	603	+1.45%
Source: INSEE

The inhabitants of the commune are known as Bazusiens in French.

== Monuments ==
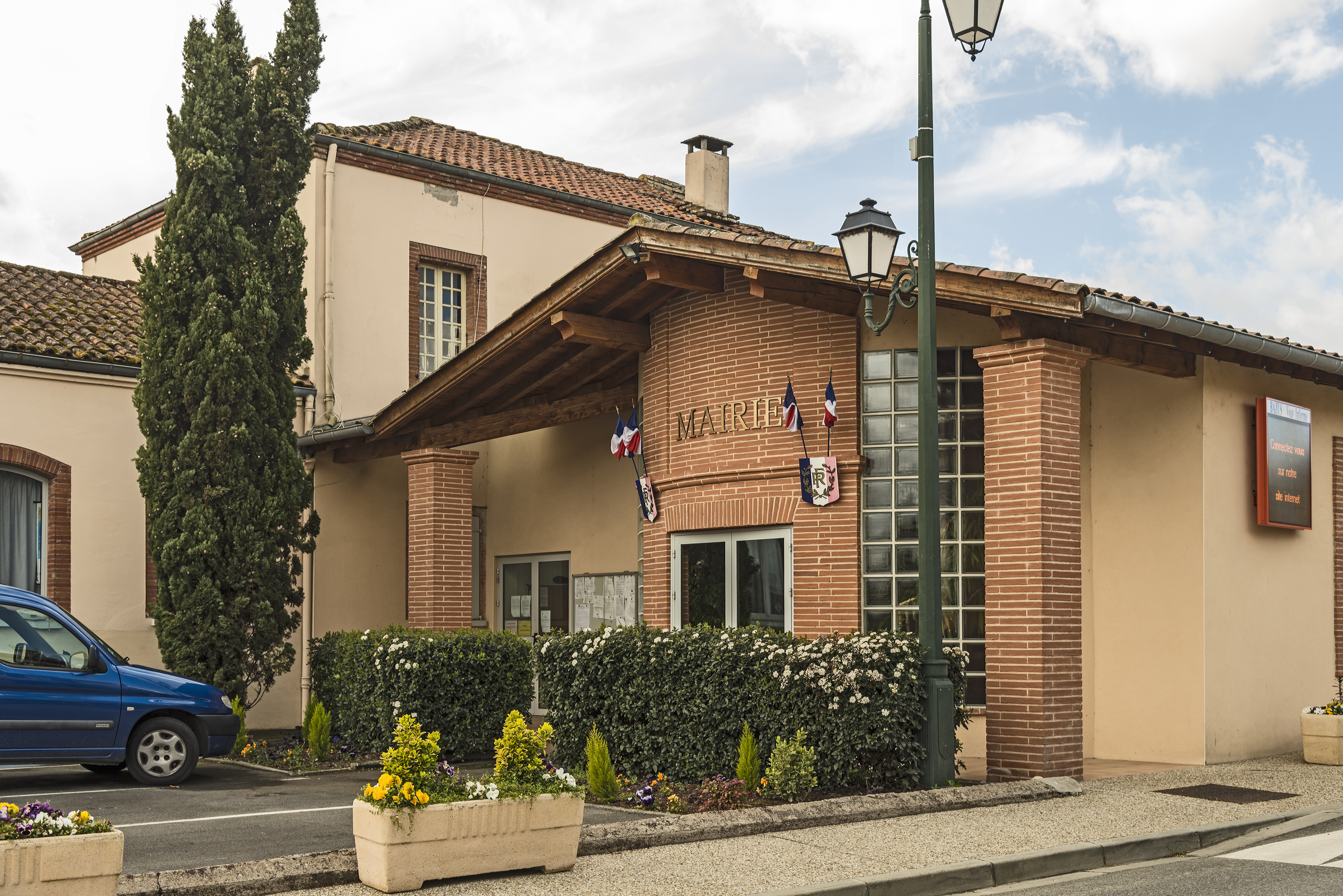
Town hall

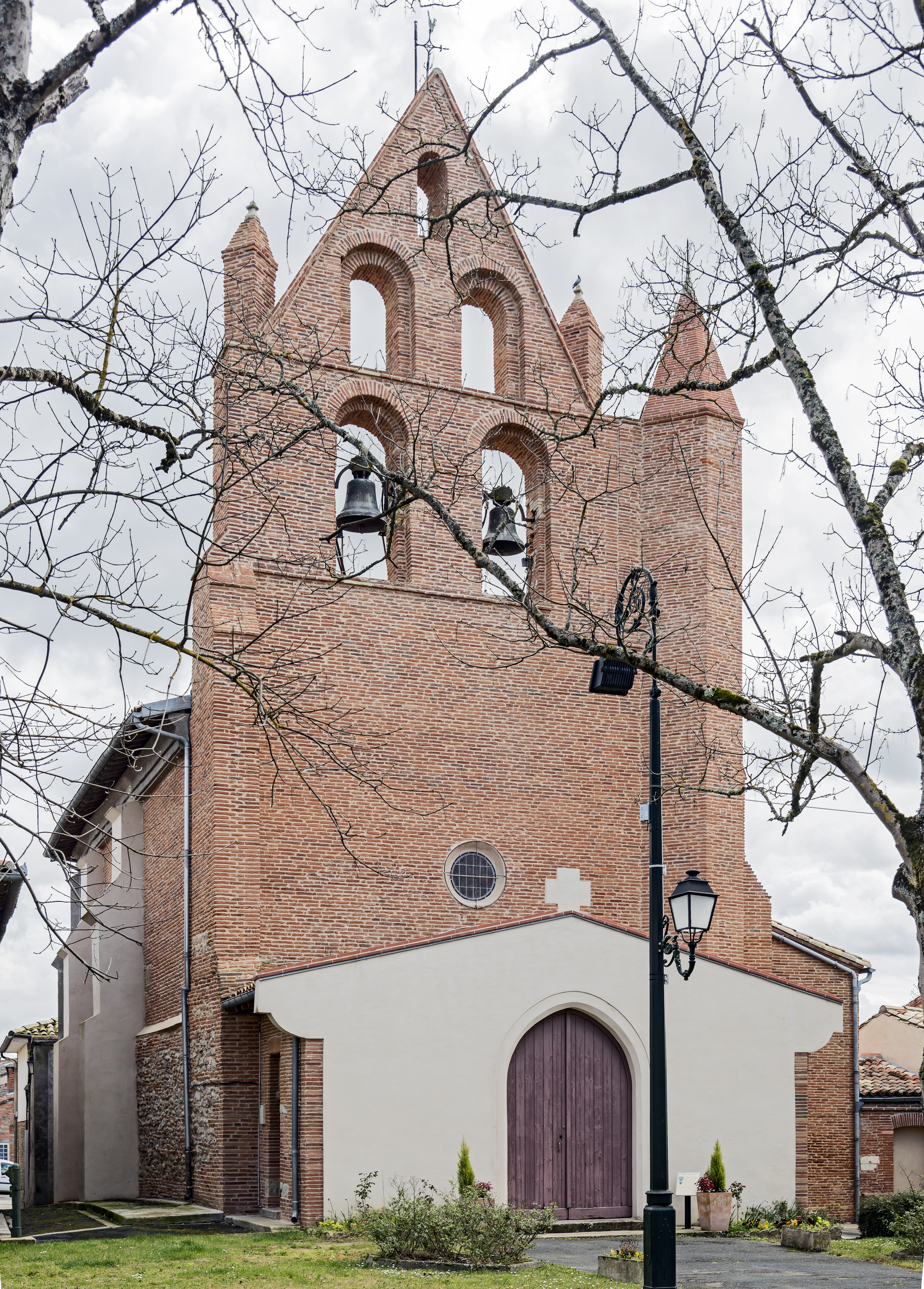
St Peter Church

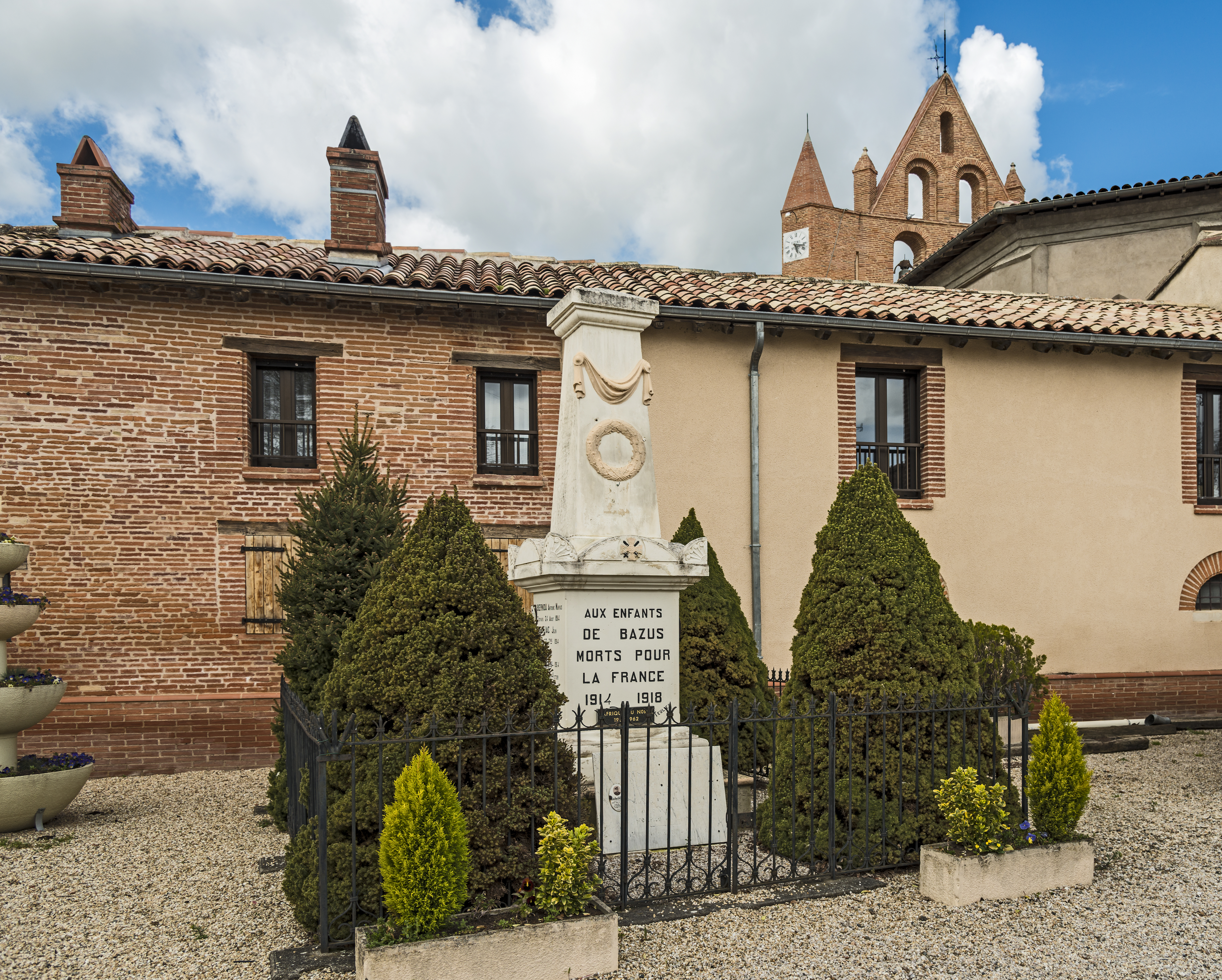
War memorial

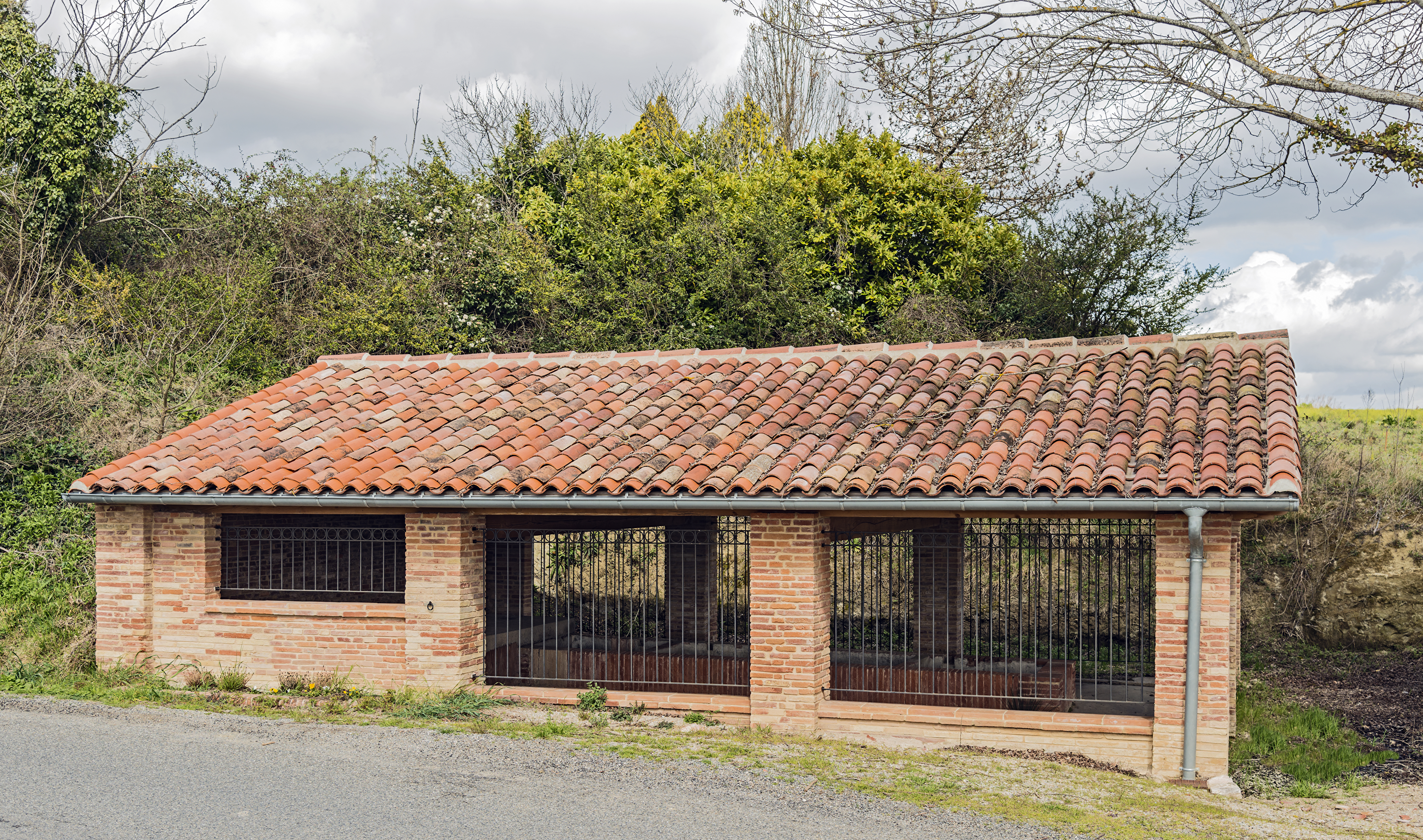
wash hall

== See also ==
- Communes of the Haute-Garonne department
