= Pechbonnieu =

- Commune
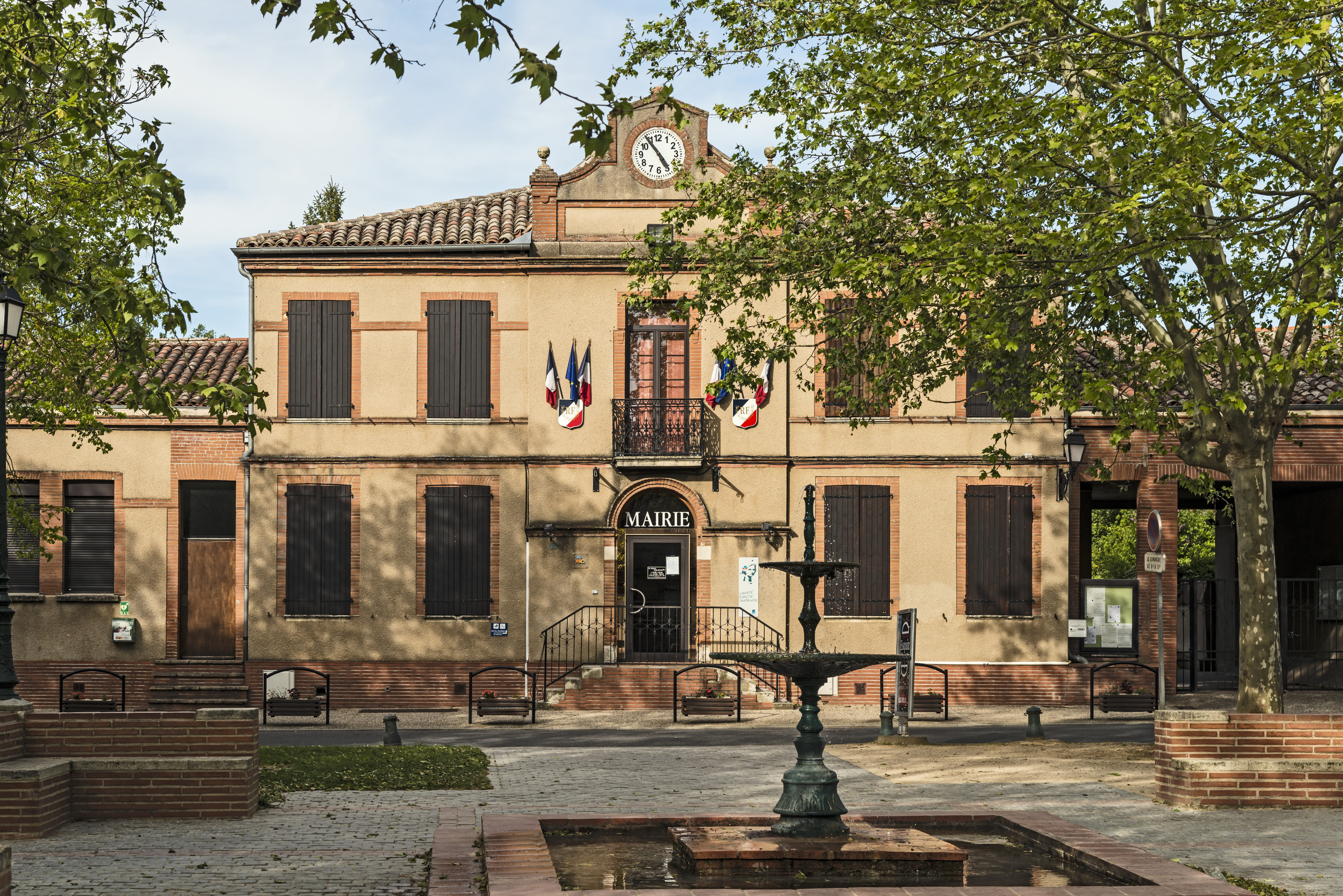
- The town hall in Pechbonnieu

- Coat of arms
- Location of Pechbonnieu
- Location within France Location within Occitanie
- Coordinates: 43°42′17″N 1°28′03″E
- Country: France
- Region: Occitania
- Department: Haute-Garonne
- Arrondissement: Toulouse
- Canton: Pechbonnieu
- Intercommunality: Coteaux-Bellevue

Government
  - Mayor (2020–2026): Sabine Geil-Gomez
- Area^{1}: 7.52 km^{2} (2.90 sq mi)
- Elevation: 200 m (660 ft)
- Highest elevation: 208 m (682 ft)
- Lowest elevation: 140 m (460 ft)
- Population (2023): 4,922
  - Density: 655/km^{2} (1,700/sq mi)
- Time zone: UTC+01:00 (CET)
  - Summer (DST): UTC+02:00 (CEST)
- INSEE/Postal code: 31410 /31140
- ^{1} French Land Register data, which excludes lakes, ponds, glaciers > 1 km^{2} (0.386 sq mi or 247 acres) and river estuaries.

Pechbonnieu (French pronunciation: [pɛʃbɔnjø]; Languedocien: Puègbonieu) is a commune in the Haute-Garonne department in southwestern France.

== Population ==
The inhabitants of the commune are known as Pechbonniliens and Pechbonniliennes in French.

Historical population
Year	Pop.	±% p.a.
1968	781	—
1975	1,289	+7.42%
1982	1,535	+2.53%
1990	1,940	+2.97%
1999	2,997	+4.95%
2007	3,688	+2.63%
2012	4,147	+2.37%
2017	4,425	+1.31%
2023	4,922	+1.79%
Source: INSEE

== Monuments ==
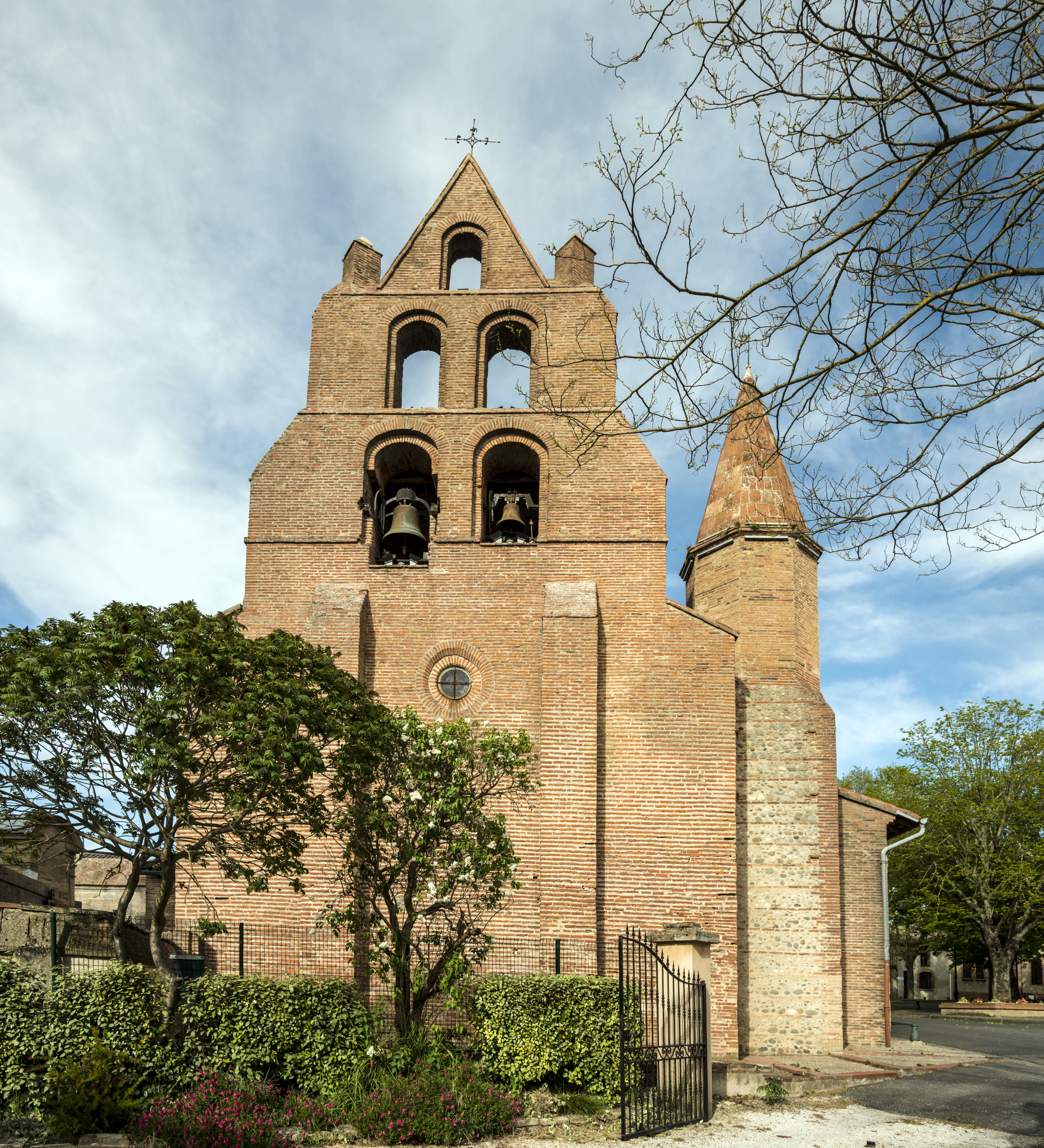
Saint Jacques Church - Bell gable

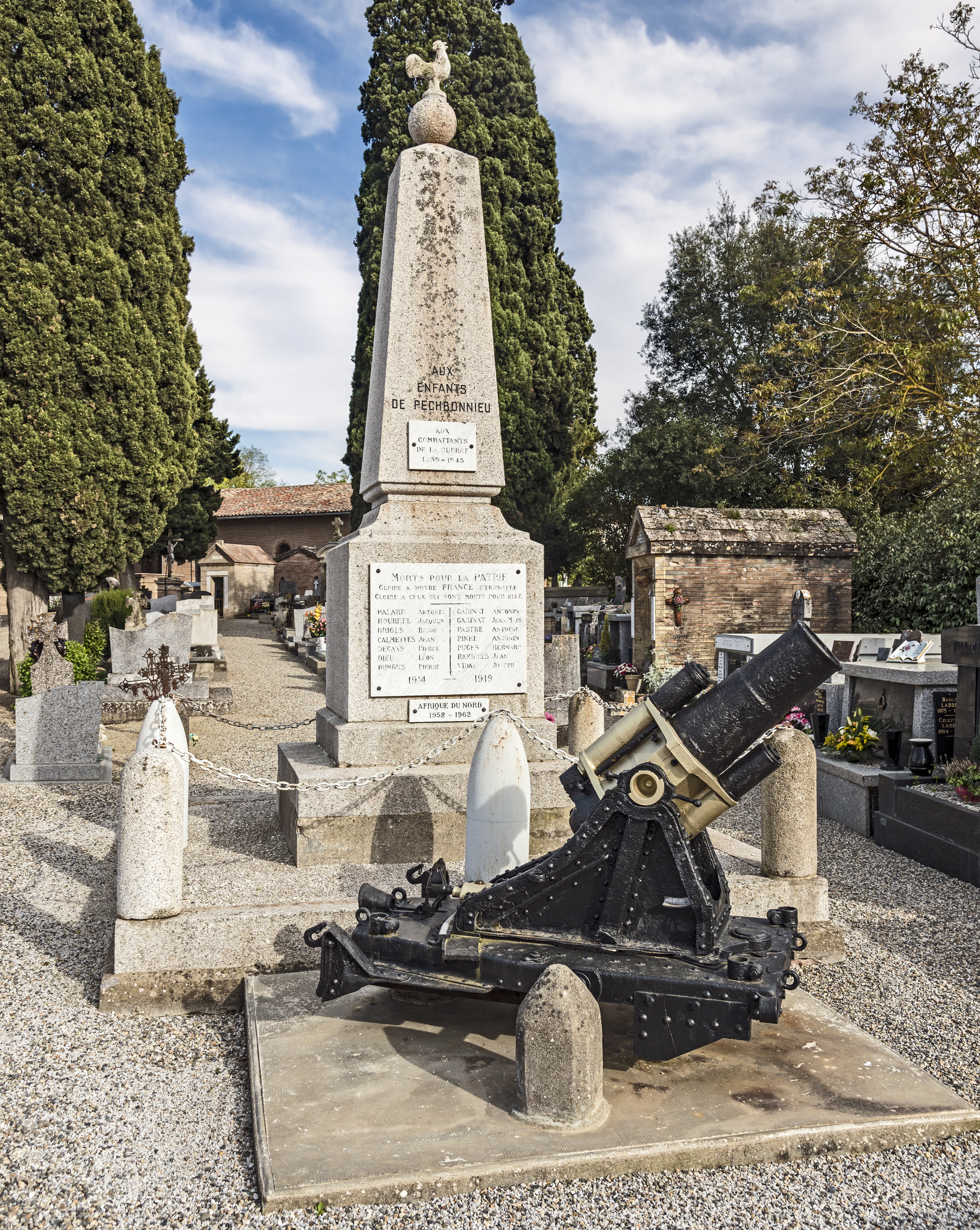
Monument to the Fallen

== See also ==
- Communes of the Haute-Garonne department
