= Roquesérière =

- Commune
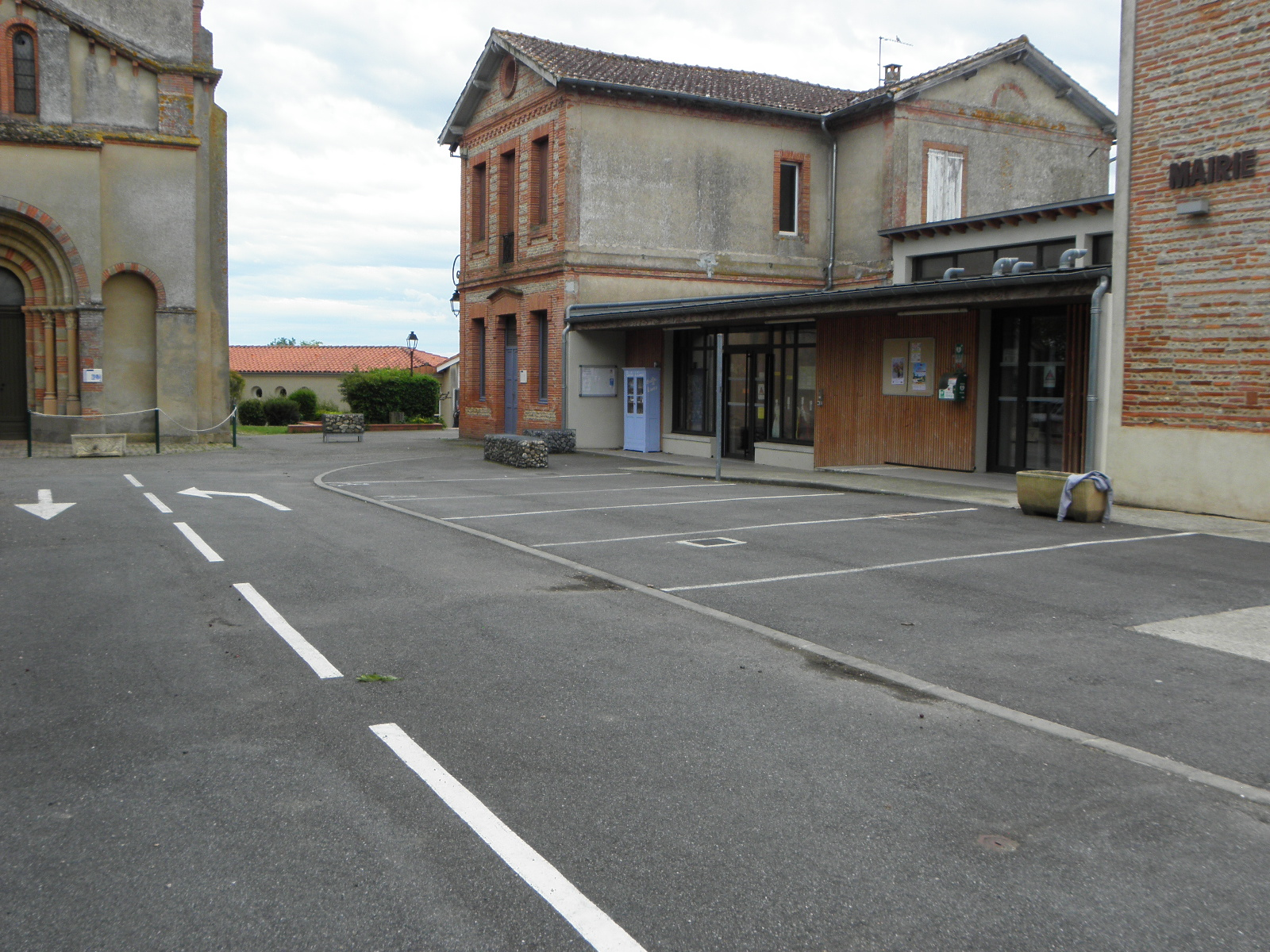
- Roquesérière Town hall
- Location of Roquesérière
- Location within France Location within Occitanie
- Coordinates: 43°44′07″N 1°38′19″E
- Country: France
- Region: Occitania
- Department: Haute-Garonne
- Arrondissement: Toulouse
- Canton: Pechbonnieu
- Intercommunality: Coteaux du Girou

Government
  - Mayor (2020–2026): Thierry Castet
- Area^{1}: 10.64 km^{2} (4.11 sq mi)
- Elevation: 185 m (607 ft)
- Highest elevation: 232 m (761 ft)
- Lowest elevation: 128 m (420 ft)
- Population (2023): 942
  - Density: 88.5/km^{2} (229/sq mi)
- Time zone: UTC+01:00 (CET)
  - Summer (DST): UTC+02:00 (CEST)
- INSEE/Postal code: 31459 /31380
- Website: www.roqueseriere.fr
- ^{1} French Land Register data, which excludes lakes, ponds, glaciers > 1 km^{2} (0.386 sq mi or 247 acres) and river estuaries.

Roquesérière (French pronunciation: [ʁɔkseʁjɛʁ]; Occitan: Ròcacerièra) is a commune in the Haute-Garonne department in southwestern France.

== Population ==
Historical population
Year	Pop.	±% p.a.
1968	294	—
1975	326	+1.49%
1982	495	+6.15%
1990	555	+1.44%
1999	615	+1.15%
2007	674	+1.15%
2012	720	+1.33%
2017	689	−0.88%
2023	942	+5.35%
Source: INSEE

The inhabitants of the commune are known as Roquesériérois in French.

== Transport ==
Roqueserière-Buzet station is on the railway line from Toulouse to Rodez.

== See also ==
- Communes of the Haute-Garonne department
