= Montberon =

- Commune
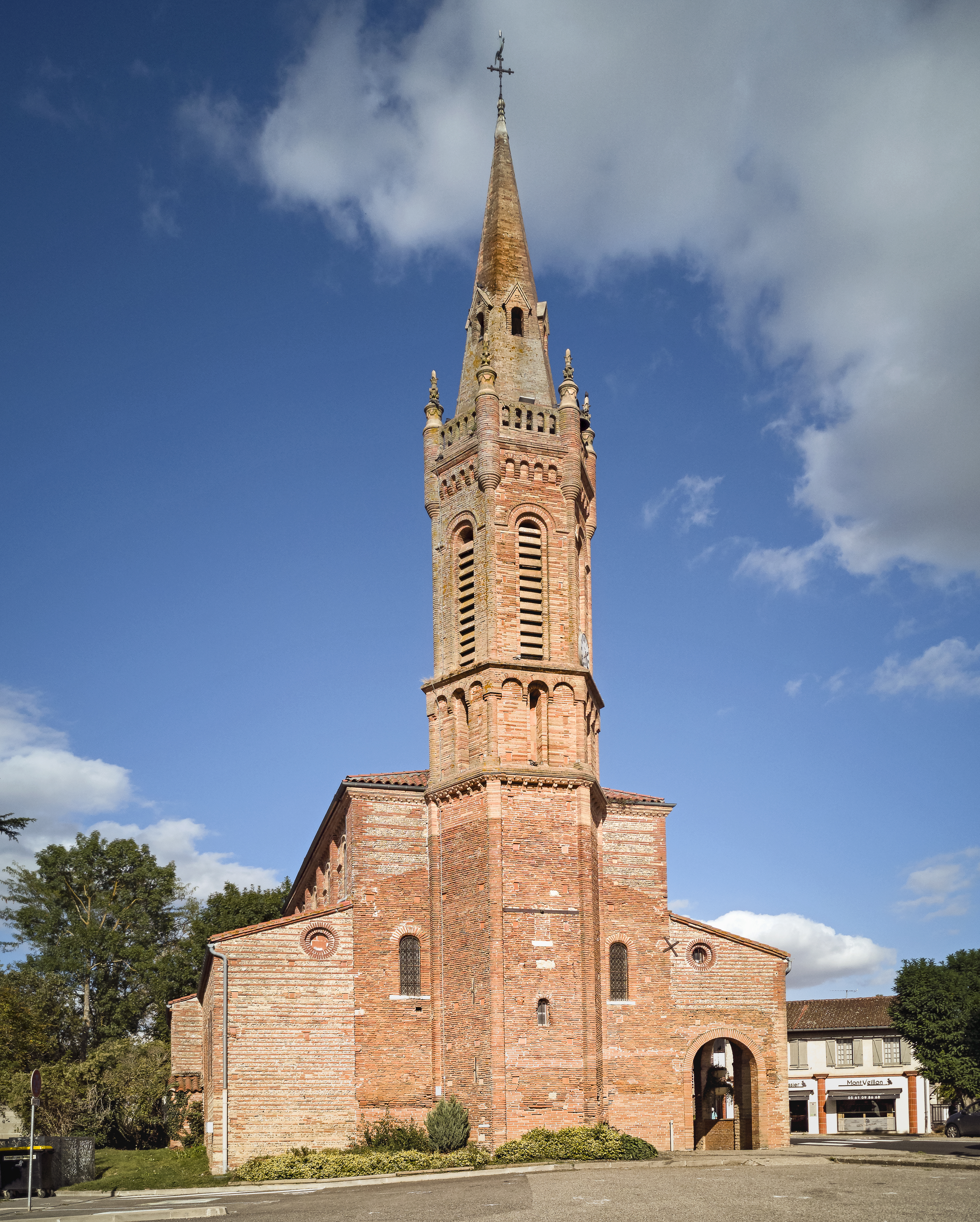
- The church in Montberon

- Coat of arms
- Location of Montberon
- Location within France Location within Occitanie
- Coordinates: 43°42′59″N 1°28′51″E
- Country: France
- Region: Occitania
- Department: Haute-Garonne
- Arrondissement: Toulouse
- Canton: Pechbonnieu
- Intercommunality: Coteaux-Bellevue

Government
  - Mayor (2020–2026): Thierry Savigny
- Area^{1}: 6.35 km^{2} (2.45 sq mi)
- Elevation: 192 m (630 ft)
- Highest elevation: 193 m (633 ft)
- Lowest elevation: 128 m (420 ft)
- Population (2023): 3,158
  - Density: 497/km^{2} (1,290/sq mi)
- Time zone: UTC+01:00 (CET)
  - Summer (DST): UTC+02:00 (CEST)
- INSEE/Postal code: 31364 /31140
- ^{1} French Land Register data, which excludes lakes, ponds, glaciers > 1 km^{2} (0.386 sq mi or 247 acres) and river estuaries.

Montberon (French pronunciation: [mɔ̃bəʁɔ̃]) is a commune in the Haute-Garonne department of southwestern France.

== Population ==
The inhabitants of the commune are known as Montberonnais in French.

Historical population
Year	Pop.	±% p.a.
1968	537	—
1975	770	+5.28%
1982	1,053	+4.57%
1990	1,485	+4.39%
1999	2,342	+5.19%
2007	2,713	+1.86%
2012	2,809	+0.70%
2017	2,925	+0.81%
2023	3,158	+1.29%
Source: INSEE

== See also ==
- Communes of the Haute-Garonne department
