= Saint-Loup-Cammas =

- Commune
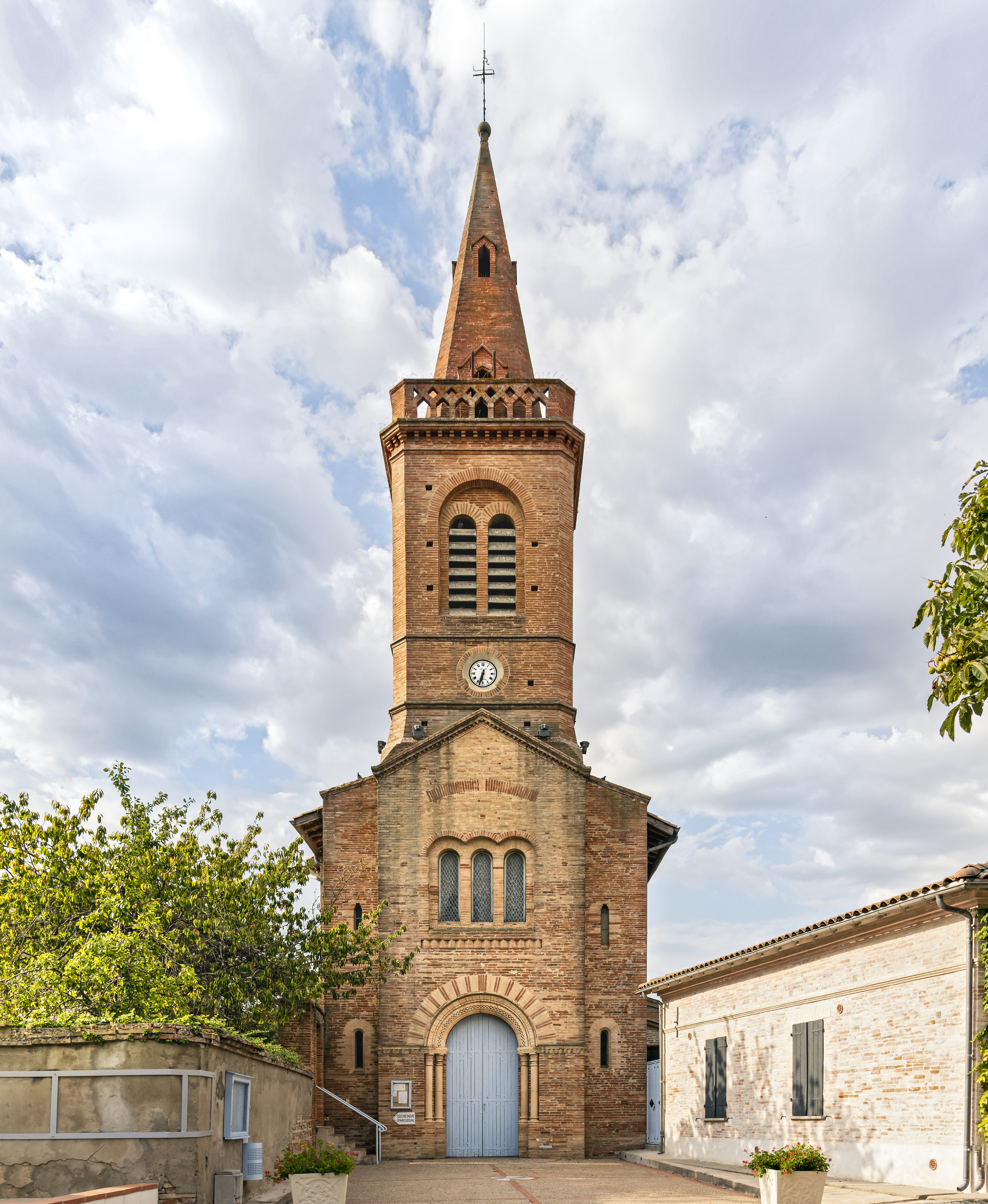

- Coat of arms
- Location of Saint-Loup-Cammas
- Location within France Location within Occitanie
- Coordinates: 43°41′51″N 1°28′44″E
- Country: France
- Region: Occitania
- Department: Haute-Garonne
- Arrondissement: Toulouse
- Canton: Pechbonnieu
- Intercommunality: Coteaux-Bellevue

Government
  - Mayor (2020–2026): Claude Marin
- Area^{1}: 3.65 km^{2} (1.41 sq mi)
- Elevation: 200 m (660 ft)
- Highest elevation: 215 m (705 ft)
- Lowest elevation: 140 m (460 ft)
- Population (2023): 2,334
  - Density: 639/km^{2} (1,660/sq mi)
- Time zone: UTC+01:00 (CET)
  - Summer (DST): UTC+02:00 (CEST)
- INSEE/Postal code: 31497 /31140
- ^{1} French Land Register data, which excludes lakes, ponds, glaciers > 1 km^{2} (0.386 sq mi or 247 acres) and river estuaries.

Saint-Loup-Cammas (French pronunciation: [sɛ̃ lu kamas]; Occitan: Sent Lop) is a commune in the Haute-Garonne department in southwestern France.

== Population ==
The inhabitants of the commune are known as Saint-Loupiens in French.

Historical population

Year	Pop.	±% p.a.
1793	231	—
1821	310	+1.06%
1846	267	−0.60%
1872	249	−0.27%
1901	227	−0.32%
1926	189	−0.73%
1946	289	+2.15%
1962	238	−1.21%
1968	285	+3.05%

Year	Pop.	±% p.a.
1975	574	+10.52%
1982	783	+4.54%
1990	1,319	+6.74%
1999	1,742	+3.14%
2007	1,872	+0.90%
2012	1,832	−0.43%
2017	2,164	+3.39%
2023	2,334	+1.27%

Source: EHESS and INSEE (1968-2023)

== See also ==
- Communes of the Haute-Garonne department
