= Saint-Jean-Lherm =

Saint-Jean-Lherm Sent Joan de l'Èrm (Occitan)
- Commune
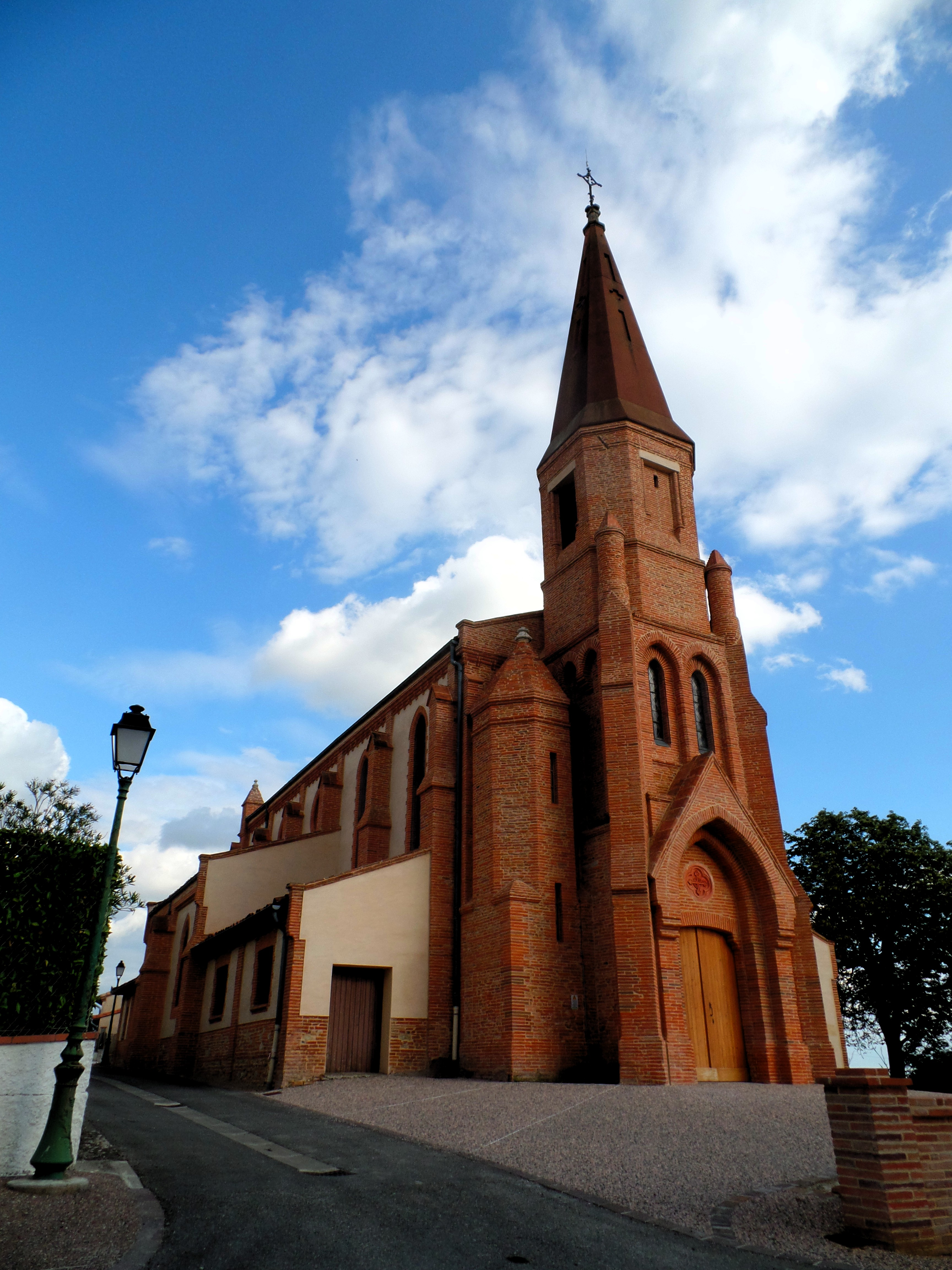
- The church in Saint-Jean-Lherm

- Coat of arms
- Location of Saint-Jean-Lherm
- Location within France Location within Occitanie
- Coordinates: 43°42′16″N 1°36′37″E
- Country: France
- Region: Occitania
- Department: Haute-Garonne
- Arrondissement: Toulouse
- Canton: Pechbonnieu

Government
  - Mayor (2023–2026): Eric Cogo
- Area^{1}: 7.92 km^{2} (3.06 sq mi)
- Elevation: 192 m (630 ft)
- Highest elevation: 251 m (823 ft)
- Lowest elevation: 146 m (479 ft)
- Population (2023): 443
  - Density: 55.9/km^{2} (145/sq mi)
- Time zone: UTC+01:00 (CET)
  - Summer (DST): UTC+02:00 (CEST)
- INSEE/Postal code: 31489 /31380
- ^{1} French Land Register data, which excludes lakes, ponds, glaciers > 1 km^{2} (0.386 sq mi or 247 acres) and river estuaries.

Saint-Jean-Lherm (French pronunciation: [sɛ̃ ʒɑ̃ lɛʁm]; Occitan: Sent Joan de l'Èrm) is a commune in the Haute-Garonne department in southwestern France.

== Population ==
Historical population
Year	Pop.	±% p.a.
1968	153	—
1975	157	+0.37%
1982	190	+2.76%
1990	233	+2.58%
1999	303	+2.96%
2007	352	+1.89%
2012	360	+0.45%
2017	371	+0.60%
2023	443	+3.00%
Source: INSEE

The inhabitants of the commune are known as Jeanlhermains in French.

== See also ==
- Communes of the Haute-Garonne department
