= Lapeyrouse-Fossat =

Lapeyrouse-Fossat La Peirosa (Occitan)
- Commune
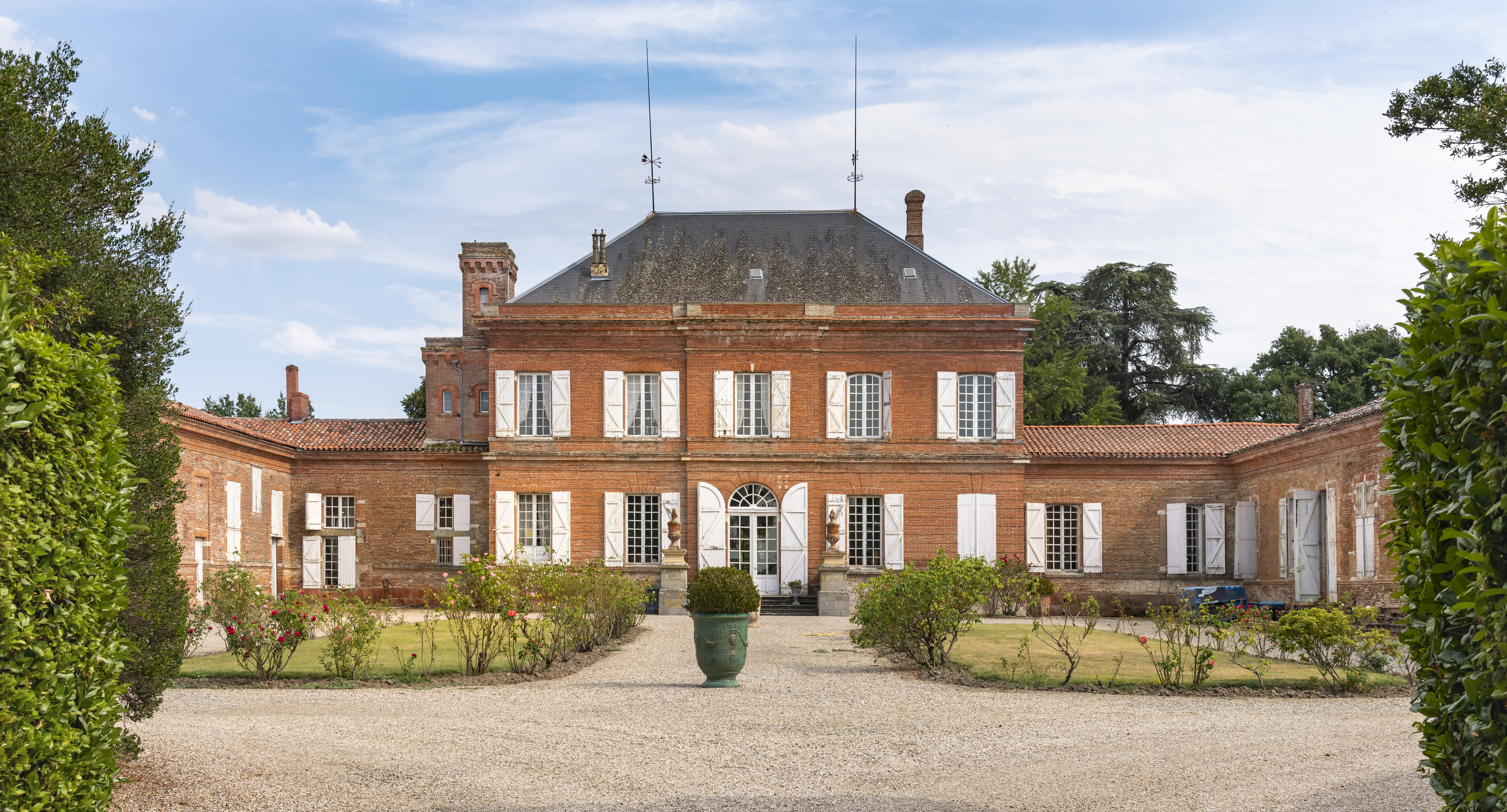
- Chateau

- Coat of arms
- Location of Lapeyrouse-Fossat
- Location within France Location within Occitanie
- Coordinates: 43°41′34″N 1°31′02″E
- Country: France
- Region: Occitania
- Department: Haute-Garonne
- Arrondissement: Toulouse
- Canton: Pechbonnieu
- Intercommunality: Coteaux du Girou

Government
  - Mayor (2020–2026): Corinne Gonzalez
- Area^{1}: 9.49 km^{2} (3.66 sq mi)
- Elevation: 195 m (640 ft)
- Highest elevation: 215 m (705 ft)
- Lowest elevation: 132 m (433 ft)
- Population (2023): 3,043
  - Density: 321/km^{2} (830/sq mi)
- Time zone: UTC+01:00 (CET)
  - Summer (DST): UTC+02:00 (CEST)
- INSEE/Postal code: 31273 /31180
- ^{1} French Land Register data, which excludes lakes, ponds, glaciers > 1 km^{2} (0.386 sq mi or 247 acres) and river estuaries.

Lapeyrouse-Fossat (French pronunciation: [lapeʁuz fosa]; Occitan: La Peirosa e Le Fossat) is a commune in the Haute-Garonne department in southwestern France.

== Population ==
The inhabitants of the commune are known as Lapeyrousiens and Lapeyrousiennes in French.

Historical population
Year	Pop.	±% p.a.
1968	607	—
1975	894	+5.69%
1982	1,295	+5.44%
1990	1,596	+2.65%
1999	2,056	+2.85%
2007	2,555	+2.75%
2012	2,768	+1.61%
2017	2,821	+0.38%
2023	3,043	+1.27%
Source: INSEE

== See also ==
- Communes of the Haute-Garonne department
