= Labastide-Saint-Sernin =

- Commune
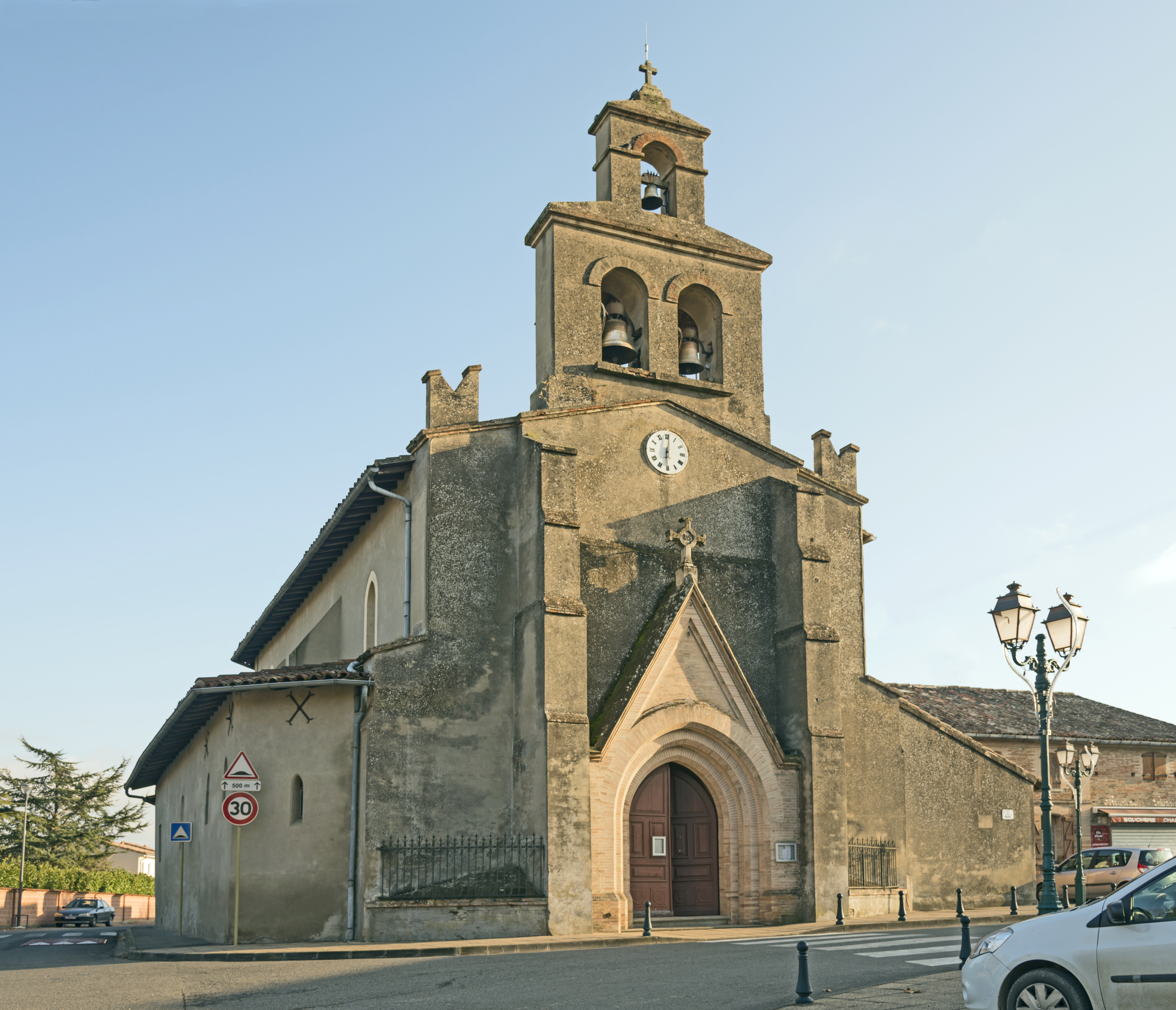
- The church in Labastide-Saint-Sernin

- Coat of arms
- Location of Labastide-Saint-Sernin
- Location within France Location within Occitanie
- Coordinates: 43°44′23″N 1°28′19″E
- Country: France
- Region: Occitania
- Department: Haute-Garonne
- Arrondissement: Toulouse
- Canton: Pechbonnieu

Government
  - Mayor (2020–2026): Bertrand Sarrau
- Area^{1}: 4.97 km^{2} (1.92 sq mi)
- Elevation: 130 m (430 ft)
- Highest elevation: 184 m (604 ft)
- Lowest elevation: 126 m (413 ft)
- Population (2023): 1,925
  - Density: 387/km^{2} (1,000/sq mi)
- Time zone: UTC+01:00 (CET)
  - Summer (DST): UTC+02:00 (CEST)
- INSEE/Postal code: 31252 /31620
- ^{1} French Land Register data, which excludes lakes, ponds, glaciers > 1 km^{2} (0.386 sq mi or 247 acres) and river estuaries.

Labastide-Saint-Sernin (French pronunciation: [labastid sɛ̃ sɛʁnɛ̃]; Occitan: La Bastida de Sant Sarnin) is a commune in the Haute-Garonne department in southwestern France.

== Population ==
Historical population
Year	Pop.	±% p.a.
1968	380	—
1975	603	+6.82%
1982	980	+7.18%
1990	1,208	+2.65%
1999	1,329	+1.07%
2007	1,710	+3.20%
2012	1,827	+1.33%
2017	1,909	+0.88%
2023	1,925	+0.14%
Source: INSEE

The inhabitants of the commune are known as Labastidiens and Labastidiennes in French.

== Sights ==
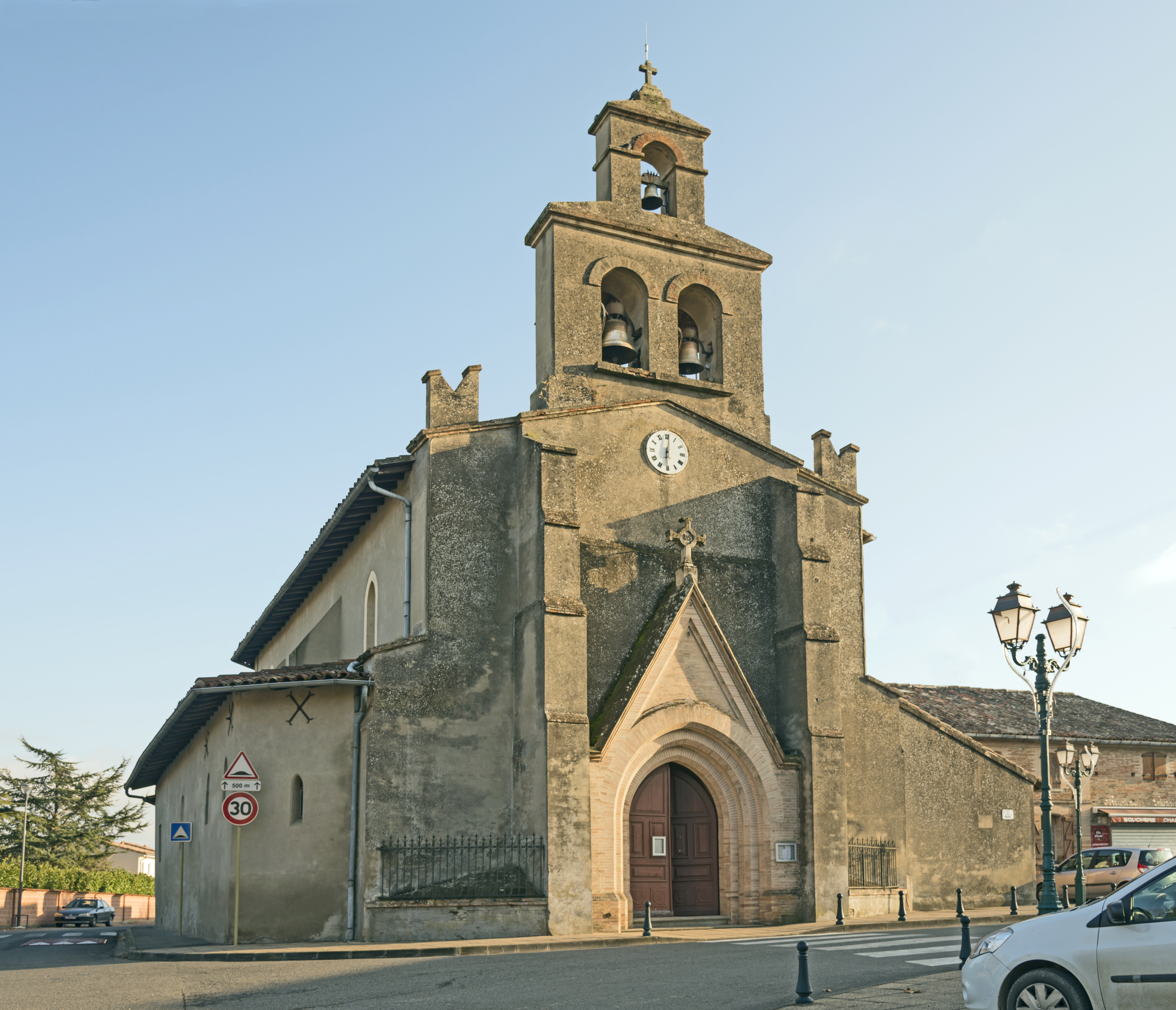
Church

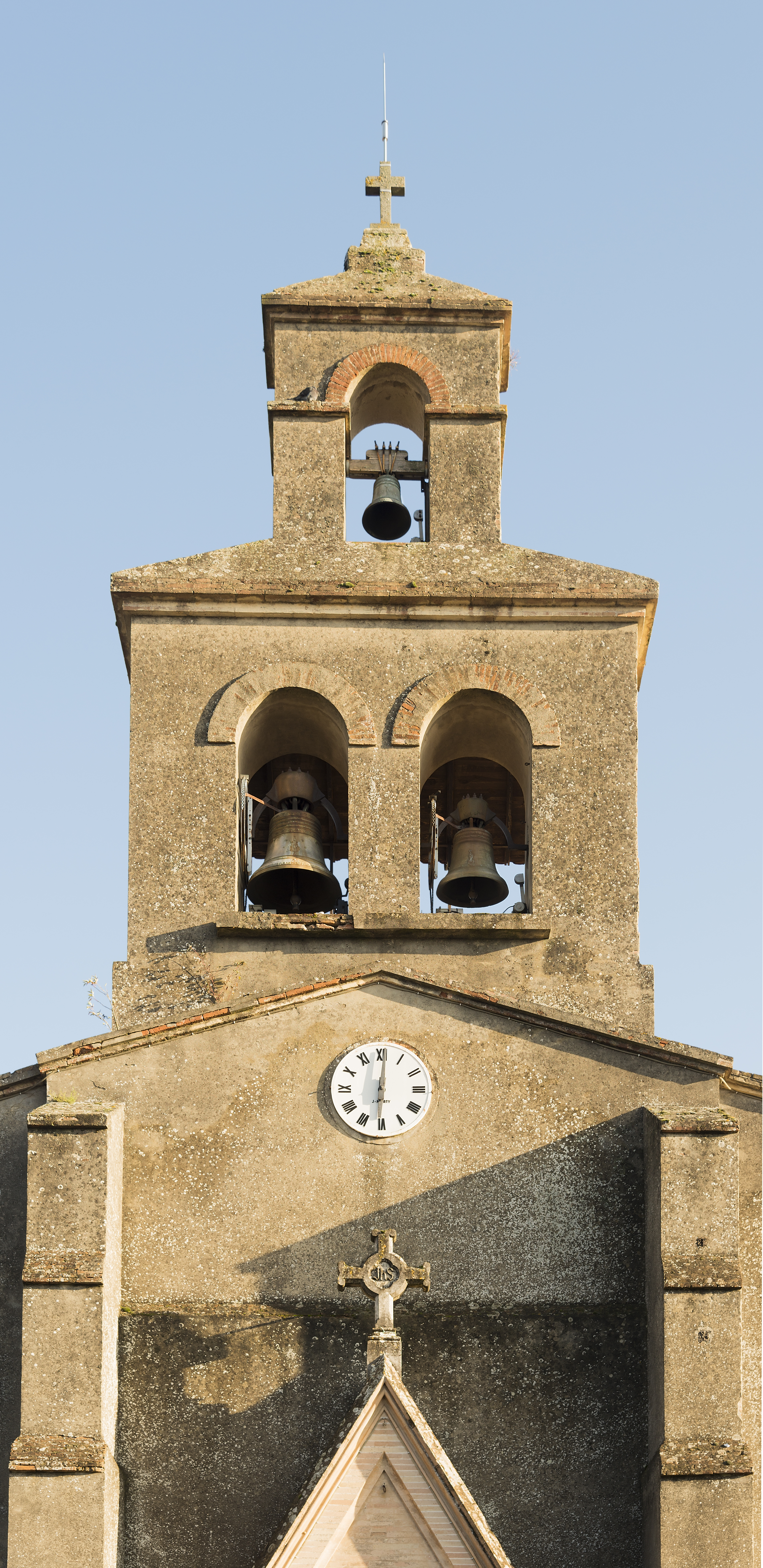
Bell gables

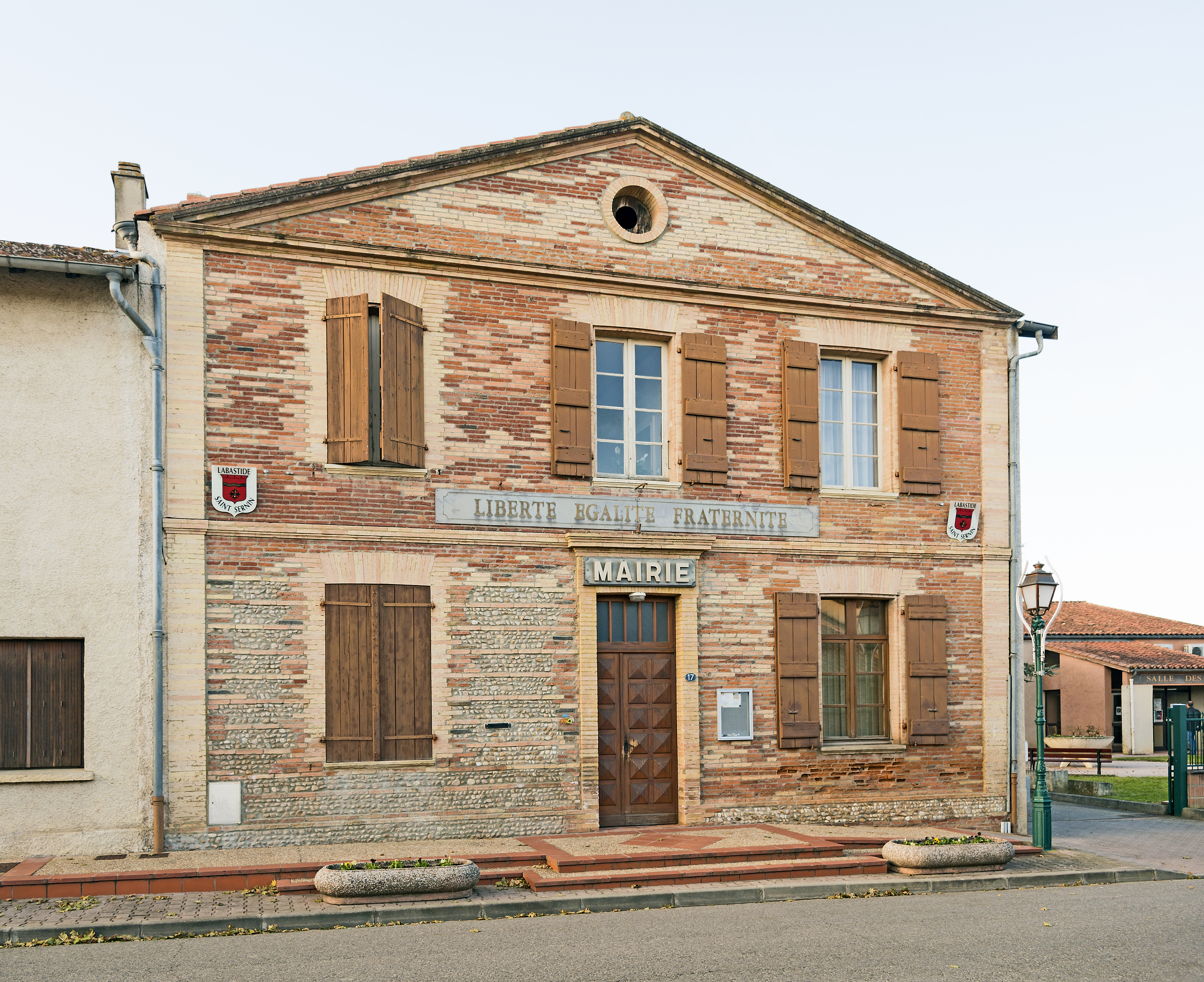
Town Hall

== See also ==
- Communes of the Haute-Garonne department
