= Marcellin =

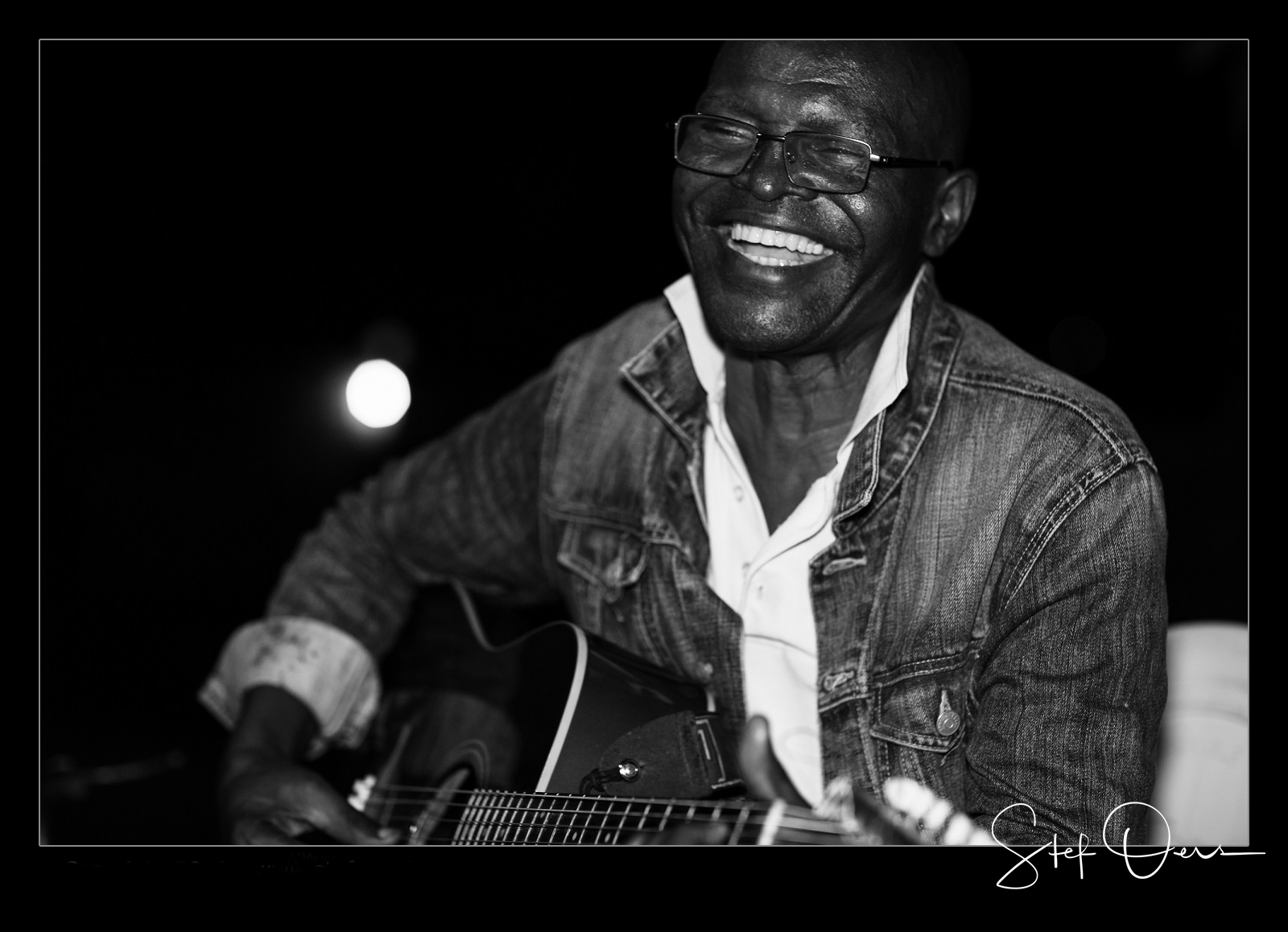
Portrait of Marcellin Ottou, by Stef Oers (2018)

Marcellin may refer to:

- Marcellin (given name)
- Raymond Marcellin (1914–2004), French politician
- Marcellin Champagnat (1789-1840), Catholic Saint and educator

places

- Marcellin College, Bulleen, a Marist Catholic secondary boys' school situated in Bulleen, Victoria, Australia
- Marcellin College, Auckland, an integrated, co-educational college in Royal Oak, Auckland, New Zealand
- Marcellin College Randwick, a systemic Roman Catholic, secondary, day school for boys, located in Randwick, in the Eastern Suburbs of Sydney, New South Wales, Australia

other

- Marcellin Act, a law establishing the Associated communes of France
- Saint-Marcellin (disambiguation)
