= Gauré =

- Commune
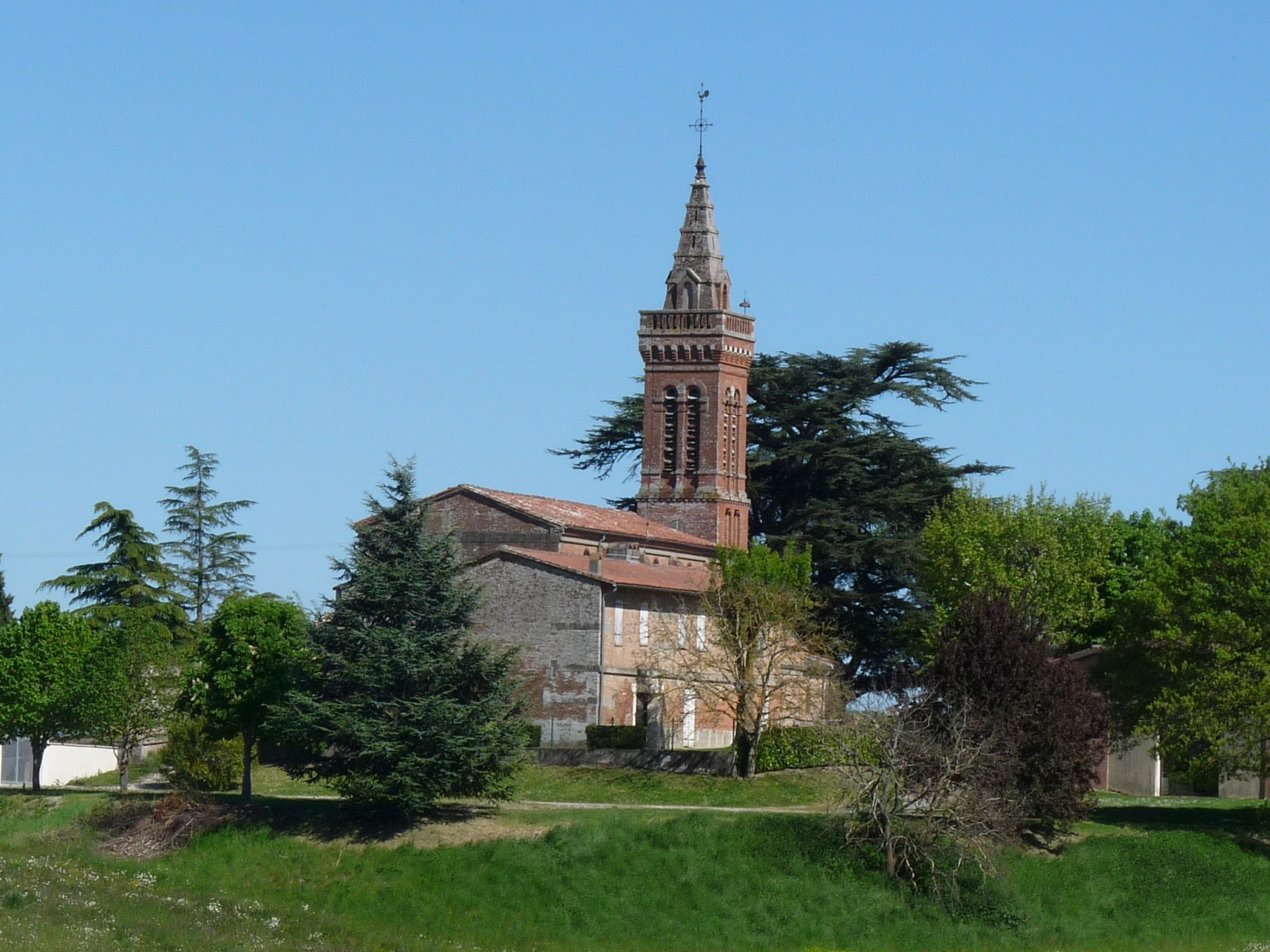
- The church in Gauré

- Coat of arms
- Location of Gauré
- Location within France Location within Occitanie
- Coordinates: 43°36′53″N 1°37′58″E
- Country: France
- Region: Occitania
- Department: Haute-Garonne
- Arrondissement: Toulouse
- Canton: Pechbonnieu

Government
  - Mayor (2020–2026): Christian Galinier
- Area^{1}: 13.47 km^{2} (5.20 sq mi)
- Elevation: 232 m (761 ft)
- Highest elevation: 243 m (797 ft)
- Lowest elevation: 164 m (538 ft)
- Population (2023): 464
  - Density: 34.4/km^{2} (89.2/sq mi)
- Time zone: UTC+01:00 (CET)
  - Summer (DST): UTC+02:00 (CEST)
- INSEE/Postal code: 31215 /31590
- ^{1} French Land Register data, which excludes lakes, ponds, glaciers > 1 km^{2} (0.386 sq mi or 247 acres) and river estuaries.

Gauré (French pronunciation: [ɡoʁe]; Occitan: Gaure) is a commune in the Haute-Garonne department in southwestern France.

== Population ==
Historical population
Year	Pop.	±% p.a.
1968	252	—
1975	270	+0.99%
1982	319	+2.41%
1990	355	+1.35%
1999	495	+3.76%
2007	493	−0.05%
2012	497	+0.16%
2017	494	−0.12%
2023	464	−1.04%
Source: INSEE

The inhabitants of the commune are known as Gauréens in French.

== See also ==
- Communes of the Haute-Garonne department
