= Marcellin (given name) =

Marcellin is a given name. Notable people with the name include:

- Marcellin Berthelot (1827–1907), French chemist and politician
- Marcellin Boule (1861–1942), French palaeontologist
- Marcellin Champagnat (1789–1840), founder of the Marist Brothers, a religious congregation of men in the Roman Catholic Church dedicated to education
- Marcellin Desboutin (1823–1902), French painter, printmaker and writer
- Marcellin Gaha Djiadeu (born 1982), professional Cameroonian football player
- Marcellin Marbot (1782–1854), French general
- Marcellin Mve Ebang (born 1959), Gabonese politician
- Marcellin Nadeau (born 1962), French politician

== See also ==
- Marcellin (disambiguation)
