= Saint-Geniès-Bellevue =

- Commune
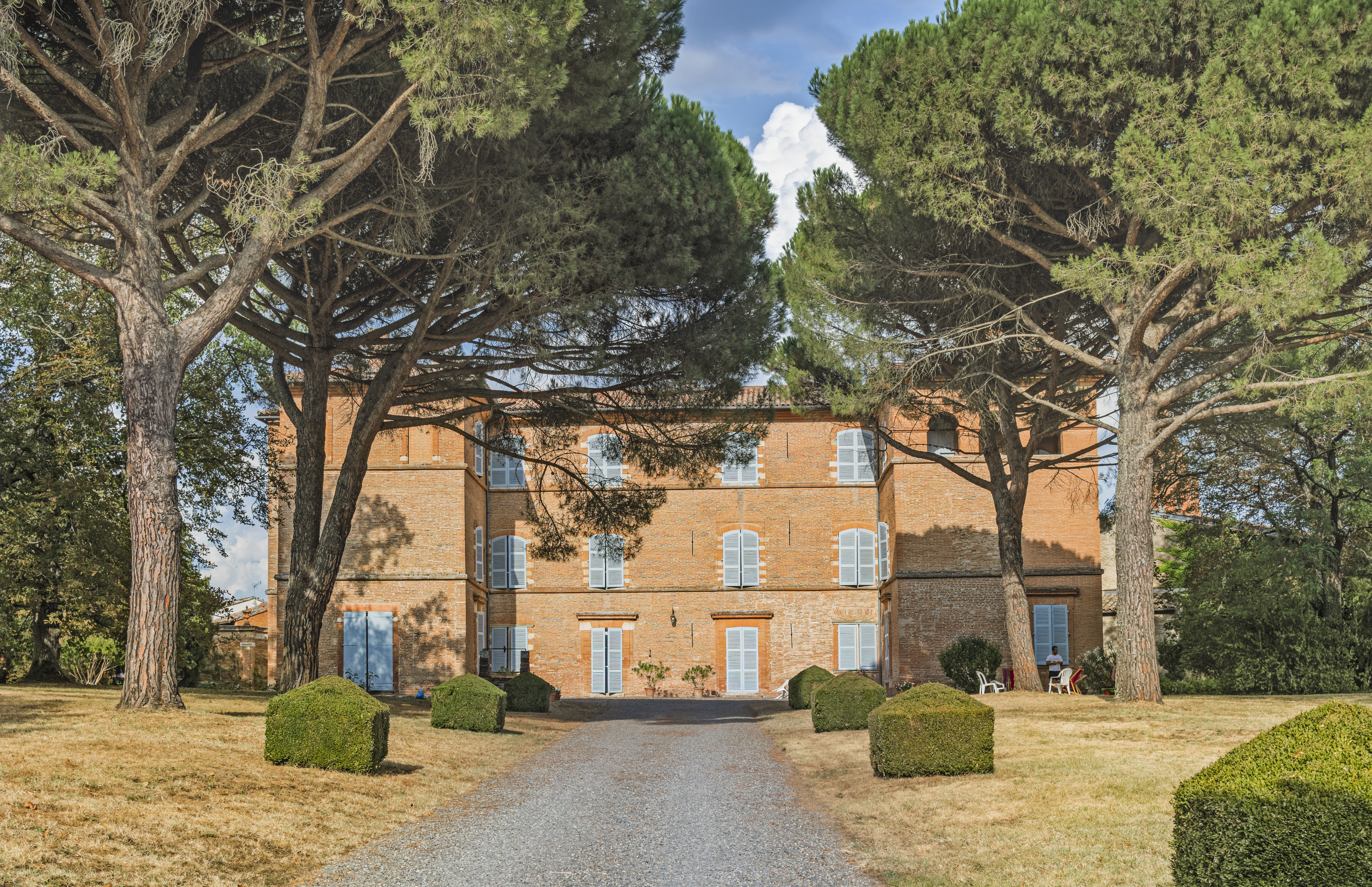
- Chateau

- Coat of arms
- Location of Saint-Geniès-Bellevue
- Location within France Location within Occitanie
- Coordinates: 43°41′03″N 1°29′11″E
- Country: France
- Region: Occitania
- Department: Haute-Garonne
- Arrondissement: Toulouse
- Canton: Pechbonnieu
- Intercommunality: Coteaux-Bellevue

Government
  - Mayor (2020–2026): Sophie Lay
- Area^{1}: 3.78 km^{2} (1.46 sq mi)
- Elevation: 200 m (660 ft)
- Highest elevation: 214 m (702 ft)
- Lowest elevation: 142 m (466 ft)
- Population (2023): 2,495
  - Density: 660/km^{2} (1,710/sq mi)
- Time zone: UTC+01:00 (CET)
  - Summer (DST): UTC+02:00 (CEST)
- INSEE/Postal code: 31484 /31180
- ^{1} French Land Register data, which excludes lakes, ponds, glaciers > 1 km^{2} (0.386 sq mi or 247 acres) and river estuaries.

Saint-Geniès-Bellevue (French pronunciation: [sɛ̃ ʒənjɛs bɛlvy]; Occitan: Sant Ginèst) is a commune in the Haute-Garonne department in southeast France.

== Population ==
The inhabitants of the commune are called Saint-Geniessois in French.

Historical population
Year	Pop.	±% p.a.
1968	630	—
1975	1,192	+9.54%
1982	1,452	+2.86%
1990	1,529	+0.65%
1999	1,781	+1.71%
2007	2,160	+2.44%
2012	2,162	+0.02%
2017	2,466	+2.67%
2023	2,495	+0.20%
Source: INSEE

== See also ==
- Communes of the Haute-Garonne department
