= Saint-Marcel-Paulel =

- Commune
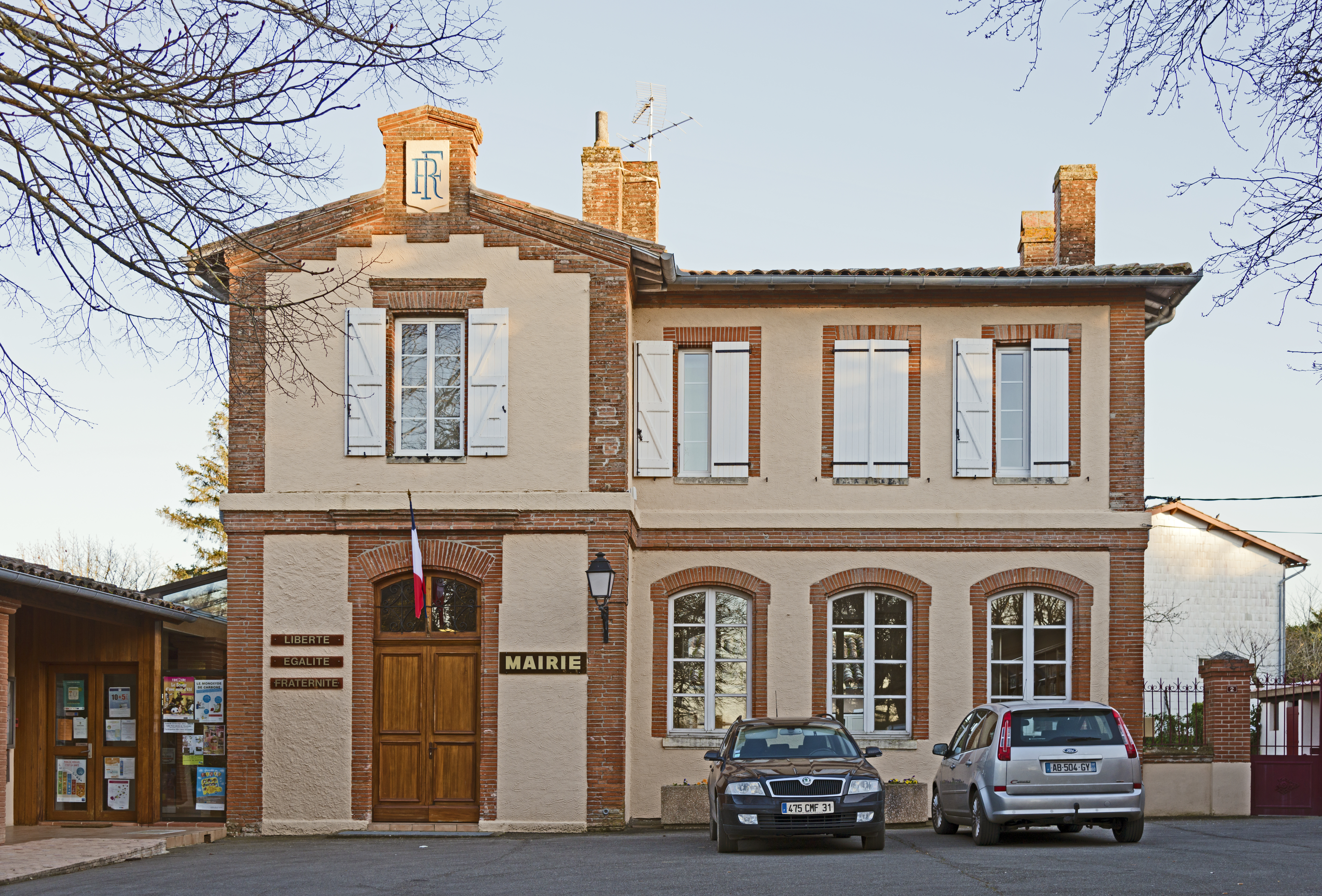
- The town hall in Saint-Marcel-Paulel

- Coat of arms
- Location of Saint-Marcel-Paulel
- Location within France Location within Occitanie
- Coordinates: 43°39′45″N 1°36′20″E
- Country: France
- Region: Occitania
- Department: Haute-Garonne
- Arrondissement: Toulouse
- Canton: Pechbonnieu

Government
  - Mayor (2020–2026): Véronique Rabanel
- Area^{1}: 7.1 km^{2} (2.7 sq mi)
- Elevation: 180 m (590 ft)
- Highest elevation: 230 m (750 ft)
- Lowest elevation: 143 m (469 ft)
- Population (2023): 483
  - Density: 68/km^{2} (180/sq mi)
- Time zone: UTC+01:00 (CET)
  - Summer (DST): UTC+02:00 (CEST)
- INSEE/Postal code: 31501 /31590
- ^{1} French Land Register data, which excludes lakes, ponds, glaciers > 1 km^{2} (0.386 sq mi or 247 acres) and river estuaries.

Saint-Marcel-Paulel (French pronunciation: [sɛ̃ maʁsɛl polɛl]; Occitan: Sent Marcèl e Paulèl) is a commune in the Haute-Garonne department in southwestern France.

== Population ==
Historical population
| Year | Pop. | ±% p.a. |
|---|---|---|
| 1968 | 213 | — |
| 1975 | 215 | +0.13% |
| 1982 | 277 | +3.69% |
| 1990 | 345 | +2.78% |
| 1999 | 401 | +1.69% |
| 2007 | 439 | +1.14% |
| 2012 | 432 | −0.32% |
| 2017 | 404 | −1.33% |
| 2023 | 483 | +3.02% |
Source: INSEE

The inhabitants of the commune are known as Marcellois in French.

== Monuments ==
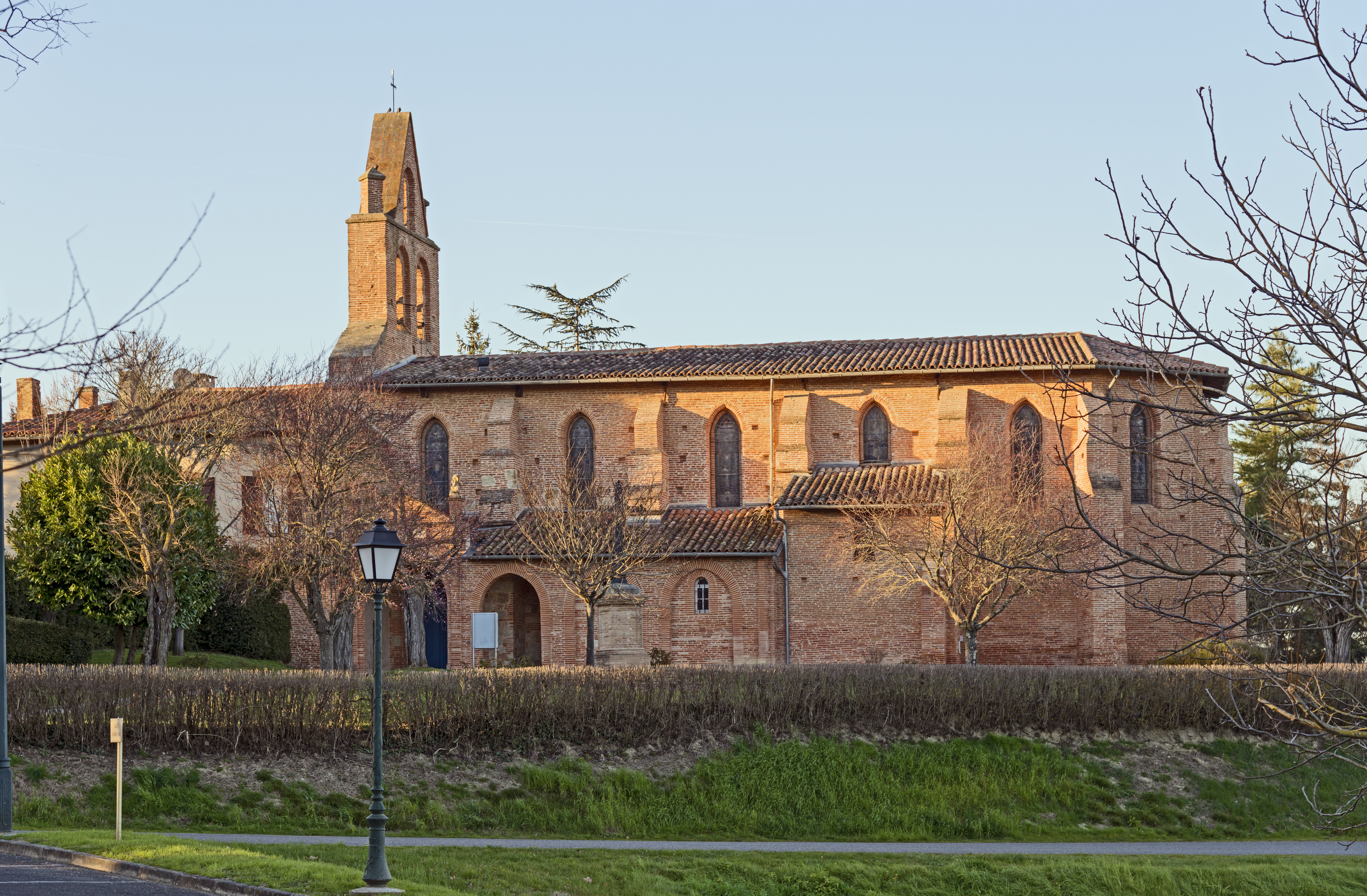
Church Saint-Pierre

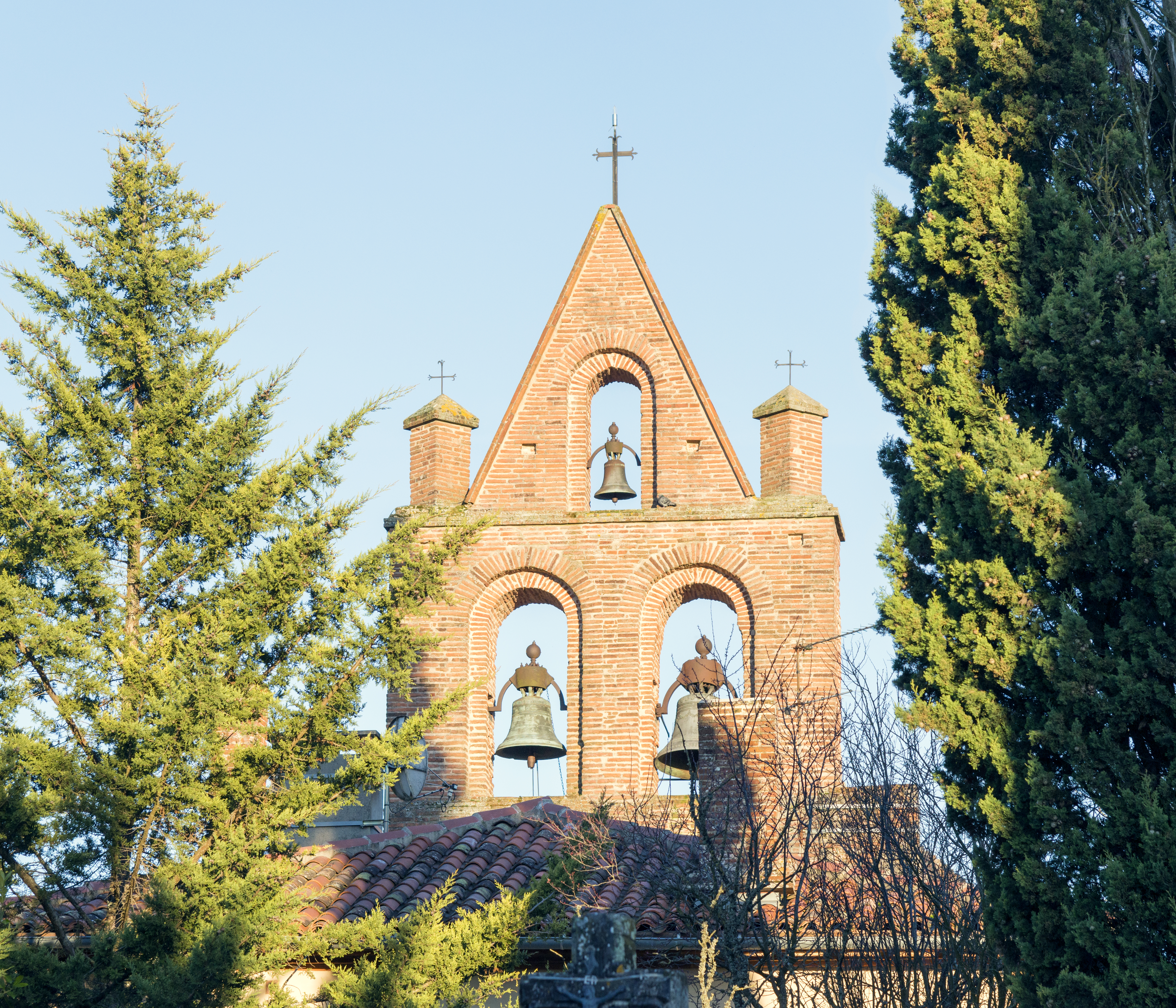
Bell gable

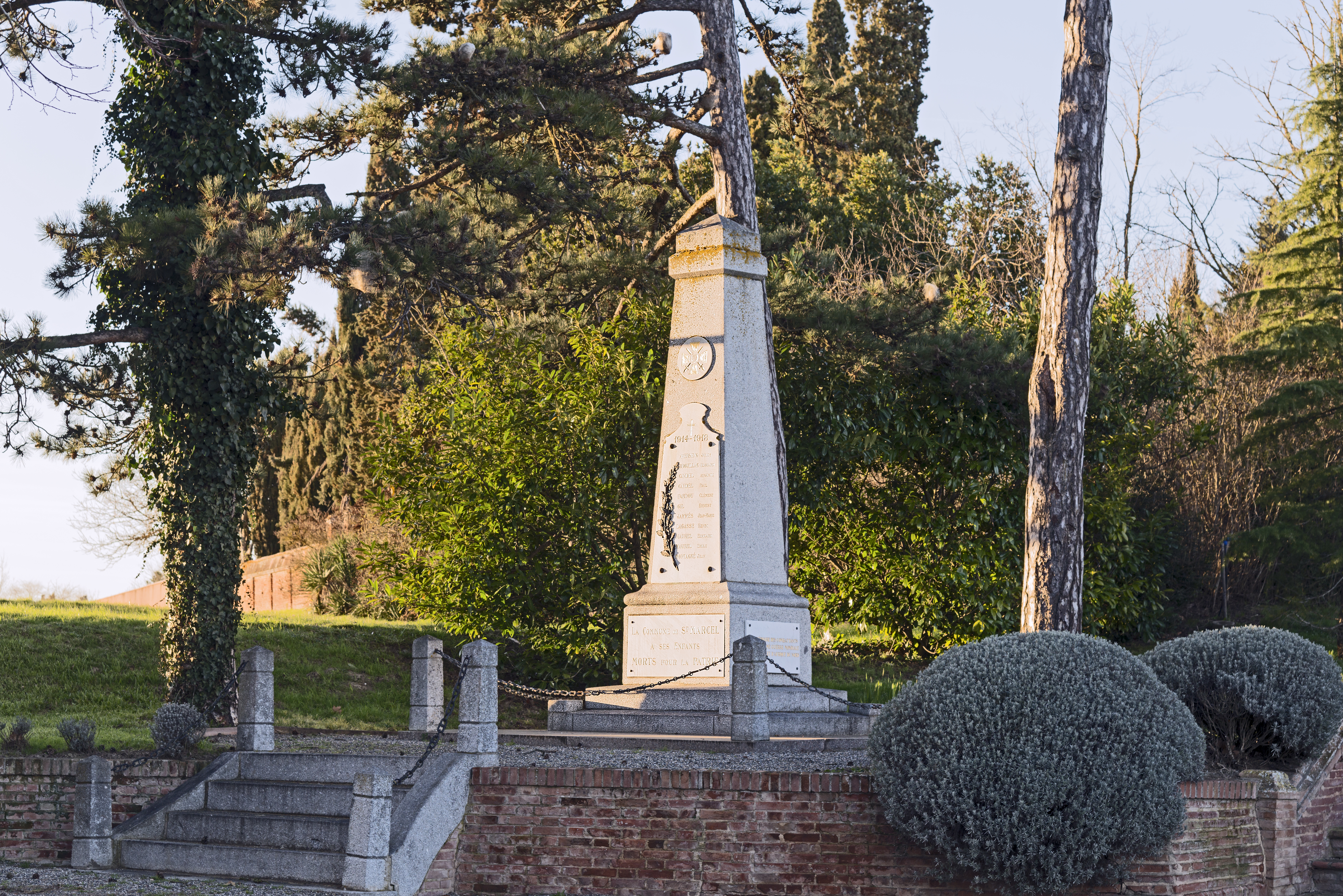
War memorial

== See also ==
- Communes of the Haute-Garonne department
