= Saint-Marcellin (disambiguation) =

Saint-Marcellin is a soft French cheese made from cow's milk.

Saint-Marcellin may also refer to:

- Saint-Marcellin, Isère, a commune in south-eastern France
- Saint-Marcellin, Quebec, a parish municipality located in the Rimouski-Neigette Regional County Municipality
- Saint-Marcellin-lès-Vaison, a commune in the Vaucluse department in southeastern France

== See also ==
- Saint-Marcel (disambiguation)
- Marcellin (disambiguation)
