= Portrait of Marguerite de Conflans =

Painting by Édouard Manet

Marguerite de Conflans
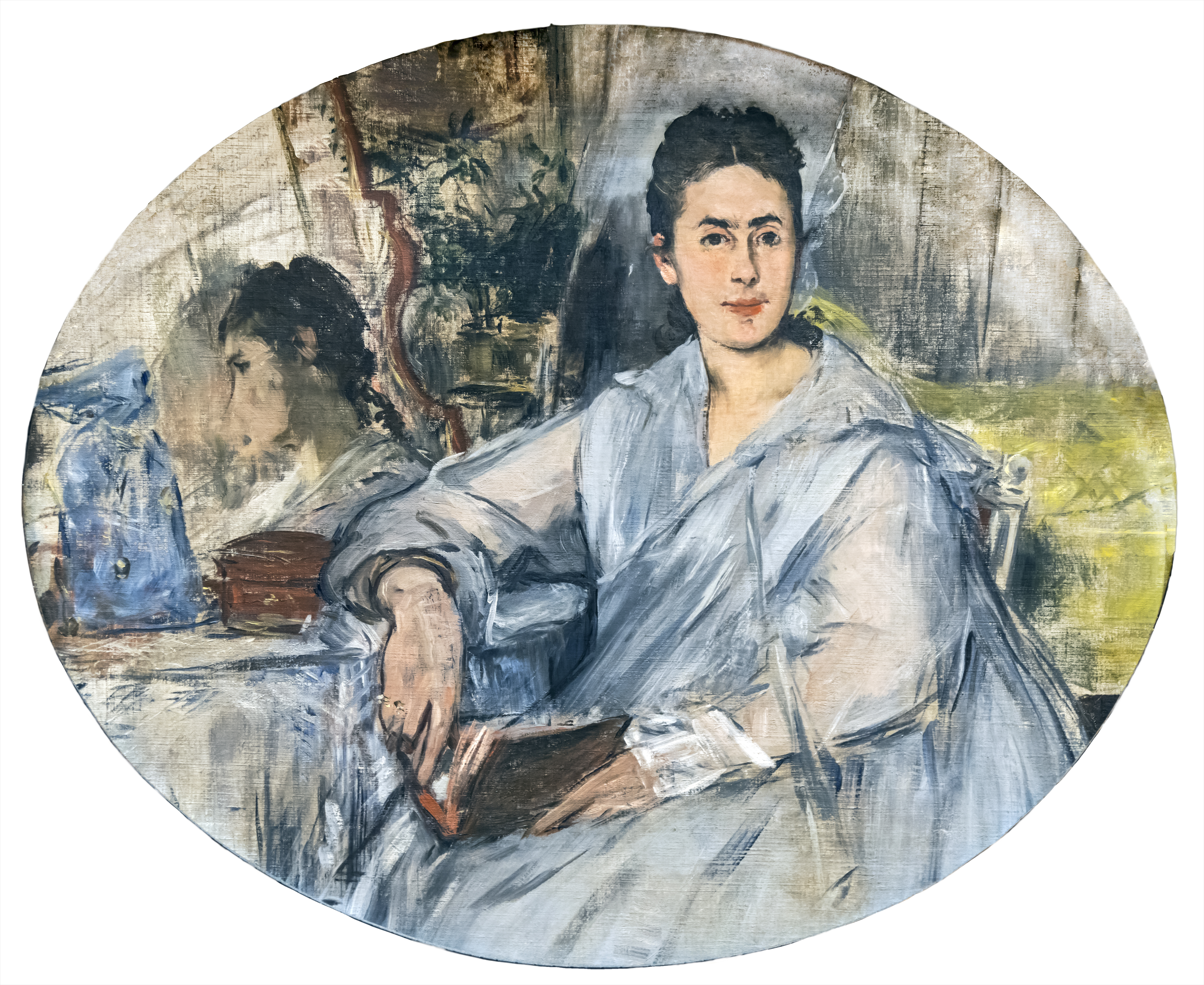
- Manet Marguerite de Conflans (D 1986 1)
- Artist: Édouard Manet
- Year: c. 1876
- Medium: oil on canvas
- Dimensions: 53 cm × 64 cm (21 in × 25 in)
- Location: Musée des Augustins, Toulouse

Portrait of Marguerite de Conflans is a c.1876 oval oil on canvas portrait by the French painter Édouard Manet. It is owned by the Musée d’Orsay, though it is on display in the red salon at the Musée des Augustins in Toulouse. Like A Bar at the Folies-Bergère, the work mimics Ingres in its use of a mirror to show the figure from several angles, a motif rarely used by Manet.

It is one of Manet's five portraits of Marguerite de Conflans, the earliest dating to 1873. He asked her to sit again and again, meeting her at receptions organised by his wife, to which de Conflans came with her mother.

It was first owned by Madamoiselle d'Angély, the subject's daughter, who left it to the Louvre in 1941. It entered that museum's collection officially in 1945. It was later assigned to the musée d'Orsay when that museum opened in 1986 - later the same year it was exchanged for Isidore Pils's The Death of a Sister of Charity from the Musée des Augustins. It was restored in 2005, enabling structural analysis of the canvas - the edges were worn but the canvas was still supple. The wooden frame seems not to be the original.

== See also ==
- List of paintings by Édouard Manet
- 1876 in art

== Bibliography (in French) ==
- Étienne Moreau-Nélaton, Manet raconté par lui-même, vol. 1 et 2, Paris, Henri Laurens, 1926, 153 p.; 153 p., p. 33
- Charles Sterling and Hélène Adhémar, Peintures: école française : xixe siècle, vol. III, Paris, R.M.N, Musée du Louvre, 1960, 53 p.
- Catalogue des peintures du musée du Louvre, vol. 1, Paris, R.M.N, Musée du Louvre, 1972, 251 p.
- Hélène Adhémar et Anne Dayez, Musée du Louvre, Musée du Jeu de Paume, Paris, R.M.N, Musée du Louvre, 1973, 163 p., p. 55; p. 149
- Emmanuel Bénézit, Dictionnaire critique et documentaire des peintres, sculpteurs, dessinateurs et graveurs (de tous les temps et de tous les pays par un groupe d’écrivains spécialistes français et étrangers, Paris, Gründ, 1976 (ISBN 2700030257)
- Etniké Pinakothéké and Alexandrou Soutsou, Catalogue Impressionnistes et post-impressionnistes des musées français de Manet à Matisse, Athènes, Grèce, Pinacothèque nationale, Musée Alexandre Soutzos, 1980, 247 p., p. 94–95, rep. n°15
- Germain Bazin, Manet, Marseille, Musée Cantini, 1961, 110 p., figure 19
- Les Donateurs du Louvre, Paris, Ed. de la Réunion des musées nationaux, 1989, 347 p. (ISBN 2-7118-2254-0), p. 136
- Dossier d’œuvre n° 70 7 83 : Manet/Marguerite de Conflans, Toulouse, Centre de documentation du Musée des Augustins
