= Nostre Dame de Grasse =

Medieval statue in Toulouse, France

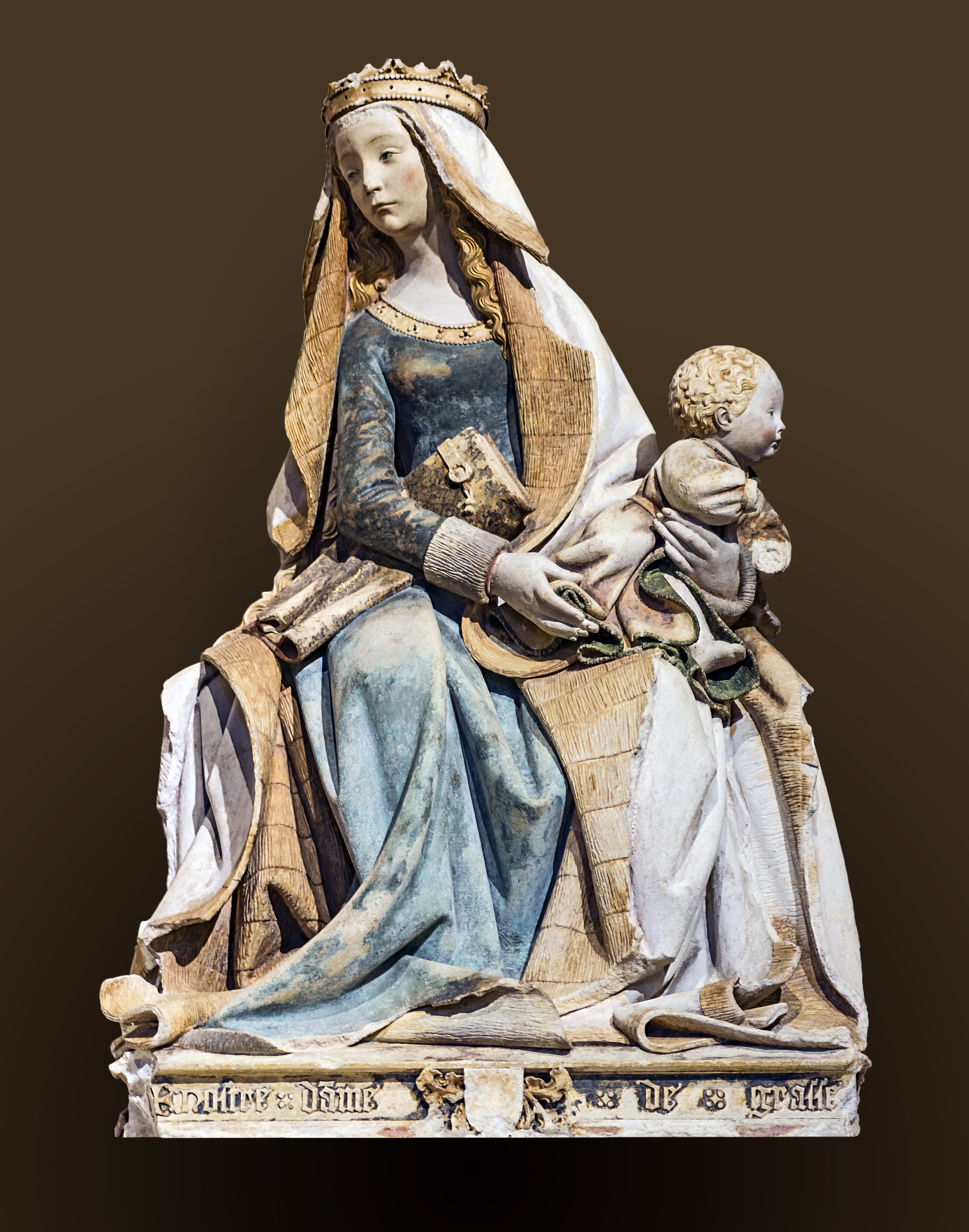
- Artist: Unknown
- Year: 1460-1500
- Medium: Polychromed sculpture in limestone
- Subject: Statue of the Virgin and Child Jesus
- Dimensions: 112 cm × 75 cm (44 in × 30 in)
- Location: Musée des Augustins, Toulouse, France

The Virgin and Child from the Augustins Museum in Toulouse, also known as Nostre Dame de Grasse (Occitan: Nostre Dama de Grassa) due to the inscription on its pedestal, is a Gothic sculpture. It may also be called Our Lady of Grace in some English-language publications.

Although its origin remains somewhat unclear, it can be dated to the late Middle Ages or early Renaissance, around the 1500s. What makes this artwork one of the most famous in the museum is the quality of its craftsmanship, both in terms of sculpture and polychromy, as well as its decorative elements. Positioned at the intersection of two eras, it bears the influence of late medieval art while foreshadowing a refined and mannerist Renaissance. The sculpture underwent restoration in the early 2000s.

== Historical background of the artwork ==
Nostre Dame de Grasse is a Gothic sculpture dating from the late 15th century, likely created between 1460 and 1480. Although recent research has shed light on questions surrounding the statue, its author, place of origin, and dates of creation remain unclear. In fact, the latest discoveries near the Rodez Cathedral suggest a dating closer to the turn of the century, around 1500. Very few documents help unravel the mystery surrounding this artwork. Contracts from that time related to stone sculpture are scarce, and no written source confirms the making of the Virgin. Similarly, there is no source indicating what happened to it after its creation. It might have been made for one of the chapels of the Church of the Jacobins and could have remained there until its transfer to the Augustins Museum in 1805.

In the 20th century, there were attempts to clean the sculpture, likely through brushing or scraping, which unfortunately contributed to the loss of its polychromy. It was in 2002 that a scientific restoration operation was decided upon. This restoration process lasted until 2004 and succeeded in revealing the original polychromy while uncovering four successive repaints. This operation provided insights into the dating and history of the artwork, while also raising new questions.

== Description ==
=== General information ===
This Madonna is a Gothic sculpture in polychromed stone (common for medieval sculptures), carved from a single block of limestone. The back of the artwork is flat as it was designed to be backed against a surface. Gilding with mixtion is prevalent throughout the piece, but in various shades. This gold is locally shaded with red glazes.

The palette and decorative techniques used are characteristic of the late Middle Ages. The combination of blue, white, and gold for the Virgin's attire aligns perfectly with medieval tradition, especially in the International Gothic style. There is a variety of textural effects, including intentional transparency created by glazes, as well as large matte areas and both thick and thin layers. Each color is achieved by the superimposition of several successive layers (two or three), adding an extra challenge in identifying repaints. This reflects a commitment to quality and significant financial resources. For instance, for the skin, the artist applied a white underlayer. Before applying any color, there was an initial oily layer serving as a pore-filler. The skin tone, with its subtle color variations (ranging from pale brown around the nails to a more intense pink), results from precise and meticulous work. However, the presence of gilding on the reverse side of the fur of the coat is a specific feature of Nostre Dame de Grasse. The study of this polychromy revealed an artist's change of mind concerning two elements: the reverse side of the book's shirt and the upper molding of the base. In both cases, there are two successive layers: a green one covered by a bright red one. The painter ultimately chose red.

The style demonstrates a genuine concern for elegance and refinement. It is evident that the sculptor exhibited exceptional skill in this work, as demonstrated by the deep carving of the limestone to detach the Virgin's right arm and emphasize the volume of the clothing folds. Even in less accessible areas, precision was maintained. For example, on the Child's torso, the Virgin's left thumb shows small irregularities, suggesting that the Child's hands might have hindered the tool's passage and were not sculpted separately. Tool marks are intentionally visible. On the garments, the trace of the ripe is still visible, leaving a regularly striated surface characteristic of Toulouse medieval sculpture. On the flesh, however, the stone is perfectly smooth. As for the furs and hair, they were crafted with fine gouges and chisels

Apart from the loss of the Child's hands and the coat of arms at the base of the statue, other stone losses appear to have occurred mainly in the 19th century and during the first half of the 20th century. Most fragments that fell over the years were promptly repositioned, but a few remain, kept in an annotated envelope found in the museum in 2003.

The artwork was repainted four times, between the 16th century and the very end of the 18th century. Subsequently, in 2002, it underwent a restoration to reveal the original polychromy.

=== The Virgin ===
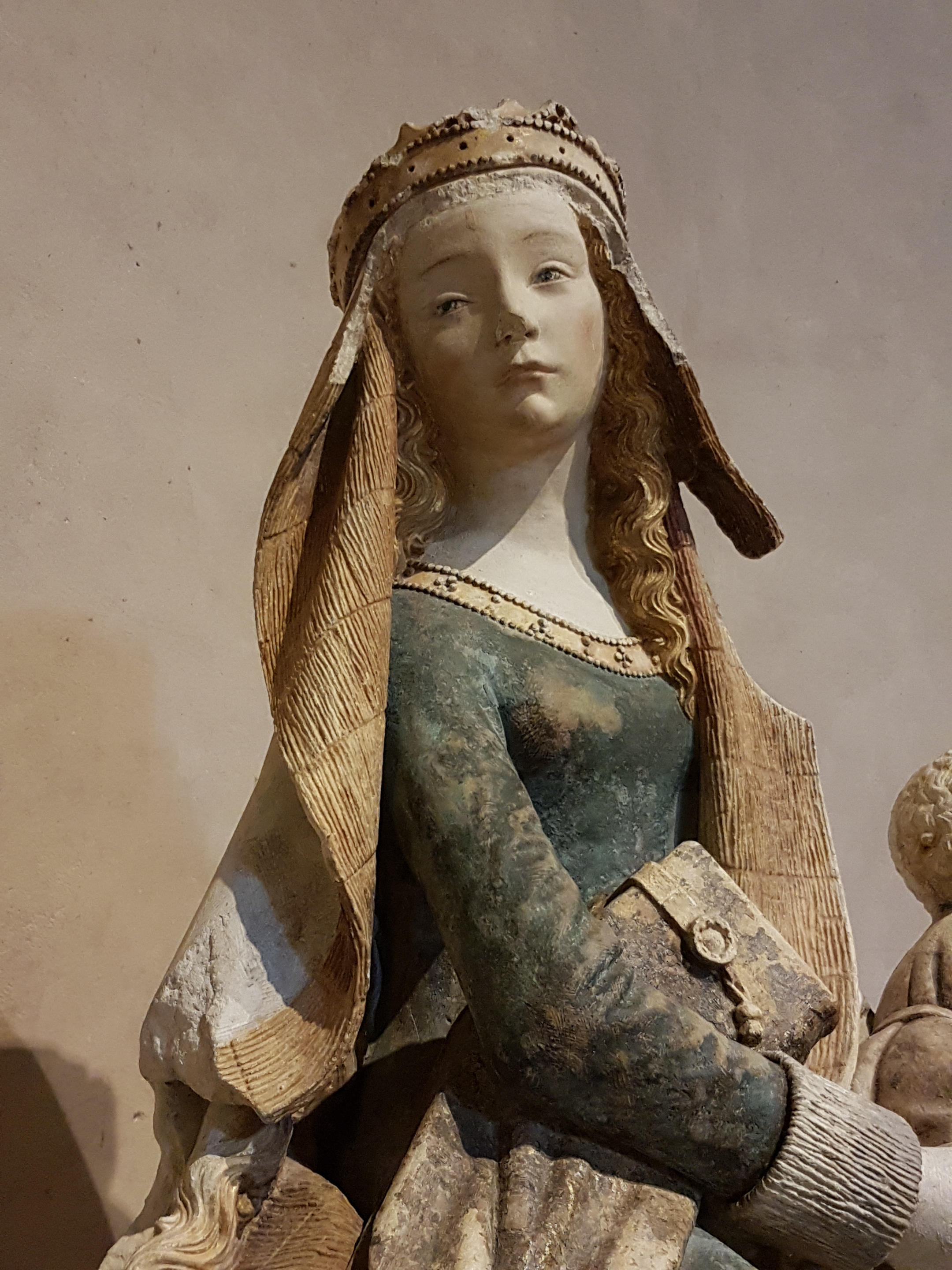
The Virgin.

The Virgin is depicted as a slender young girl with a pale complexion and wavy golden hair, adorned with blue eyes. The delicate features of her face convey a melancholic expression.

She wears a blue dress, fitted at the upper body, and a white/gray cloak with a golden reverse serving as a veil, treated in a naturalistic manner as the color sought to imitate vair. The starry motifs on her dress have disappeared over time. In some less visible parts of the border and lining of the cloak, gilding has been replaced by a silver/gold alloy covered with a yellow glaze, indicating an economical approach using a technique known in Germany in the late Middle Ages. The gold of the upper trim of the dress, as well as her crown, were likely enhanced with pearls or stones due to the regular perforations observed. However, there is no sign of wear or rubbing due to the presence of any decorative stones. No fragments of these materials or even rust have been found to prove this, nor any traces of glue. So, for the neckline of the dress, it seems that there were never any ornaments. In contrast, for the crown, there is still the hypothesis that a diadem was added around it and attached, with stones inserted into the holes without being blocked.

She appears to be holding a book emerging from a bag. However, it is more likely the shirt of the book, serving as its protection, closed by a system of leather ties and fittings. This fabric shirt and the book it protects are adorned with a decoration created using the technique of Applied brocades. They are gilded and decorated with motifs painted in black. The patterns depict circles containing a quatrefoil and stylized foliage. They could evoke an Italian lampas from the 14th century. The reverse of this shirt, as well as the attachment, were once red. This can still be glimpsed on the underside of the shirt.

=== The Child Jesus ===
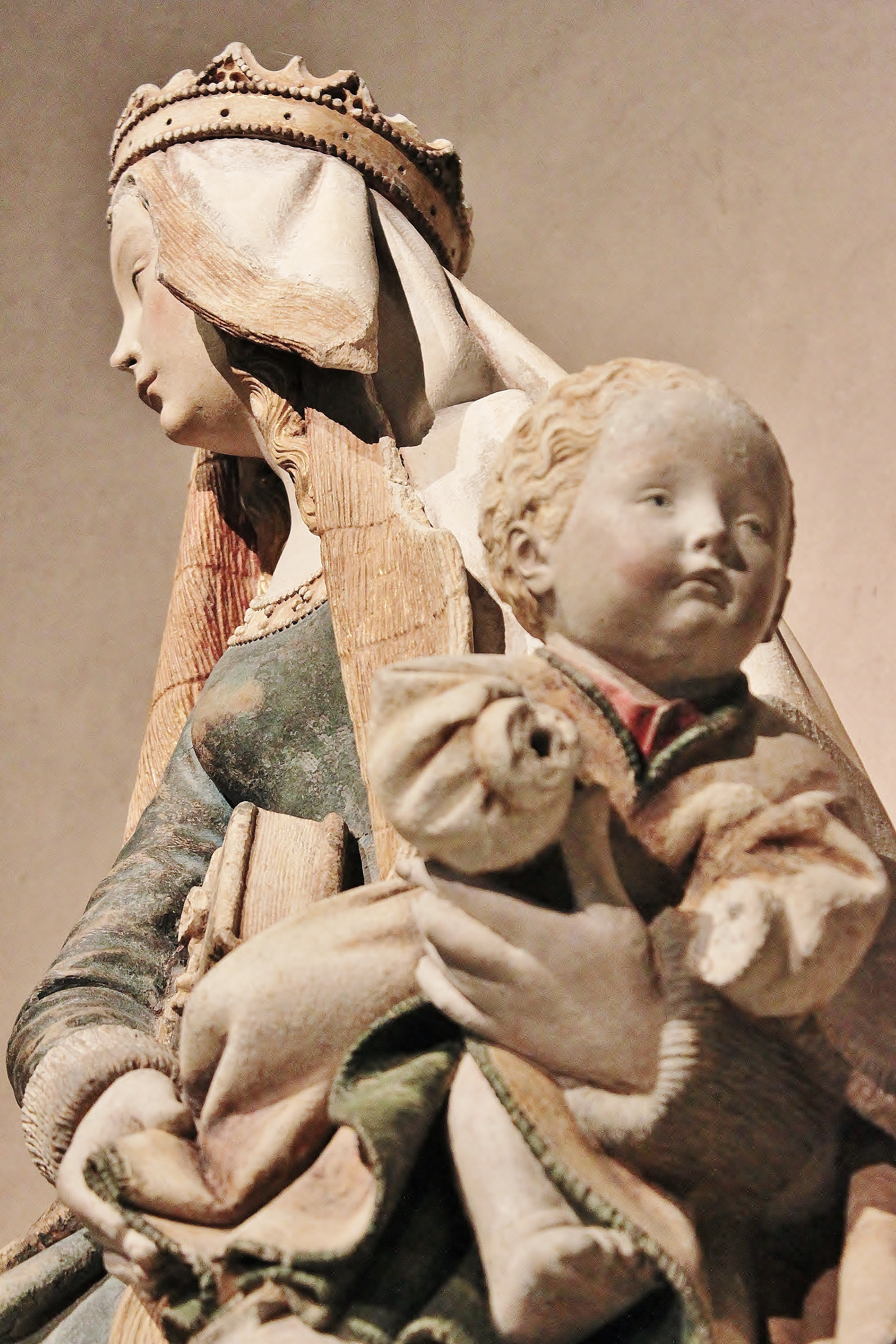
The Child Jesus.

The Child has a round face with rosy cheeks. His eyes are blue, and his hair is blonde, resembling that of his mother. He wears a carmine red tunic over a green shirt, with the collar visible, a color combination that seems quite surprising for the time. The reverse side of the tunic, once adorned with starry motifs, is also green.

The loss of his hands constitutes the most significant gap in the group. Reconstructed in 1835 after a deliberation by the municipal council, they were removed before the 1930s.

=== The statue base ===
The base is black, and the cross, along with the inscription and foliage framing the central shield, is in gold. Positioned on the molded base of the sculpture, the shield, surrounded by still-visible curly cabbage leaves, was deliberately destroyed, most likely during the revolutionary period to eliminate the coat of arms of the commissioner. On October 28, 1793, the Republic banned all royal coats of arms. Thus, the arms of the shield were likely chopped down by order of the Republic, unless it was an act of revolutionary vandalism. An inscription that still remains reads: "Nostre Dame de Grasse," which gave its name to the statue.

== Expositions ==
- "Secret Polychromies: Around the Restoration of Two Major Works from 15th-Century Toulouse," Toulouse, Musée des Augustins, December 10, 2005 - April 30, 2006
- "1500: Art in France between the Middle Ages and the Renaissance," Galeries Nationales du Grand Palais, Paris, October 4, 2010 - January 10, 2011, The Art Institute, Chicago, February 26 - May 30, 2011
- "Exhibition of French Art (1200-1900)," Royal Academy of Arts, London, 1932
