= Master of Rieux =

French sculptor

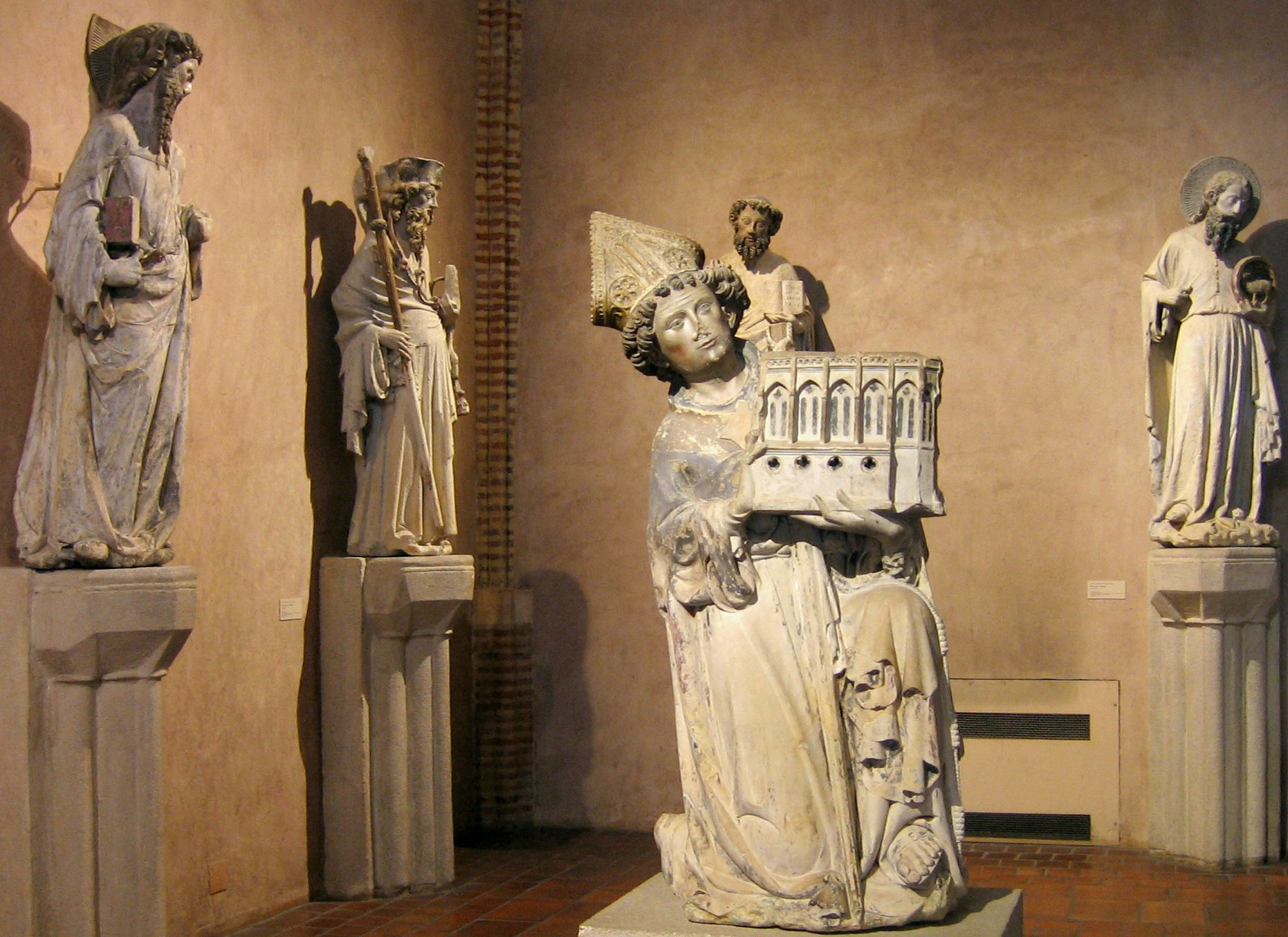
Sculptures by the master of Rieux at the Musée des Augustins (Toulouse) - In the foreground, Jean Tissendier, bishop of Rieux

The Master of Rieux was a French 14th century anonymous master sculptor based in Rieux-Volvestre, then an important cultural and spiritual centre. His style spread throughout Languedoc and as far as Catalonia thanks to its quality and stylistic originality. He is noted for his use of sculpture fully in the round, a mannerist and elegant style with hair, beards and folds of drapery demonstrate the sculptor's virtuosity.

Most of his surviving works come from the Notre-Dame de Rieux chapel in the Cordeliers (Franciscans) convent in Toulouse (destroyed in 1804) where he worked for Jean Tissendier, a Franciscan from Toulouse who was bishop of Rieux. Its sculptures are one of the most beautiful testimonies of Franciscan art and piety in the 14th century.

His works can be seen in the musée des Augustins in Toulouse and the ceiling bosses of Saint-Maurice de Mirepoix.

Gallery

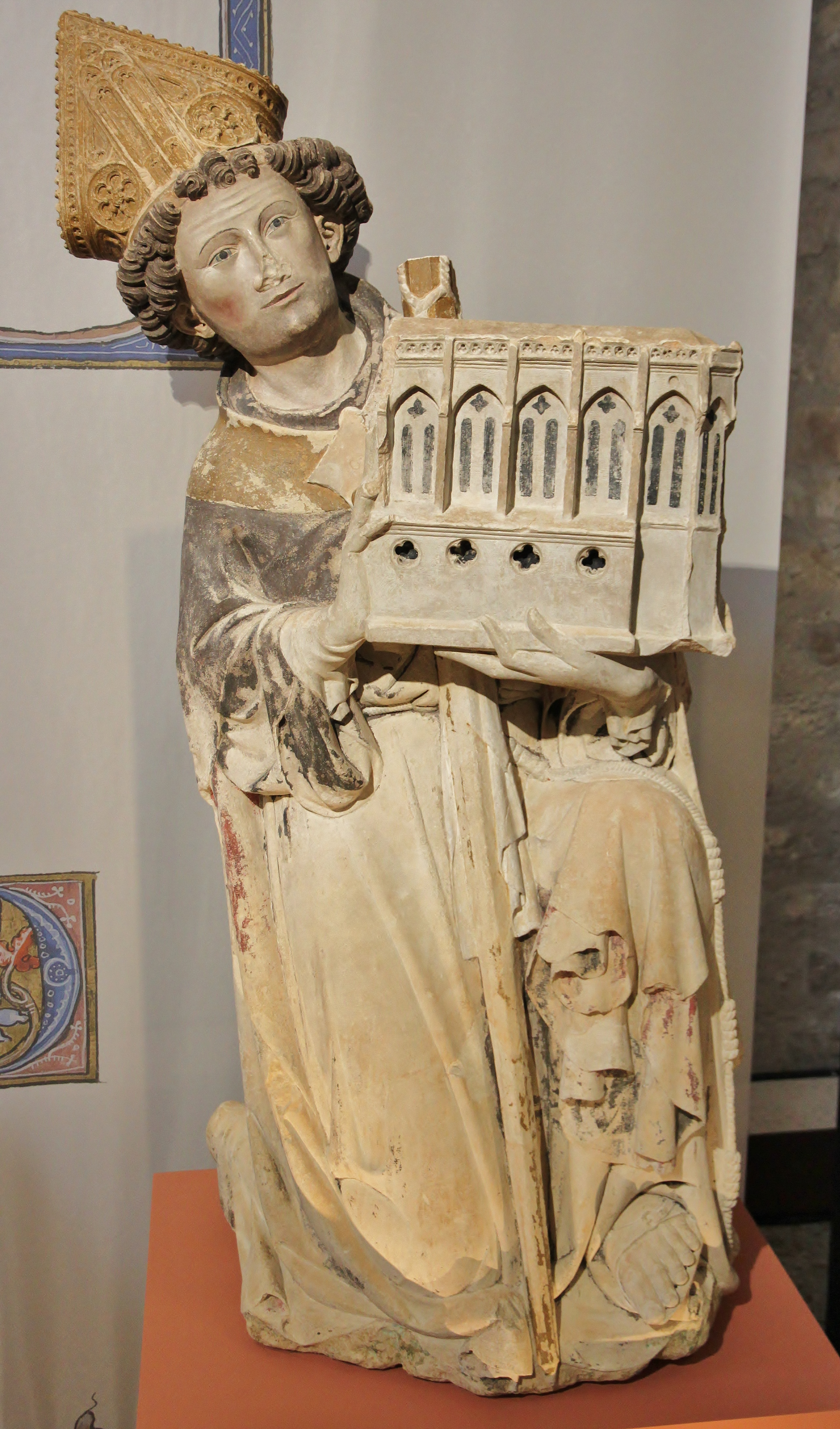
Bishop Jean Tissendier

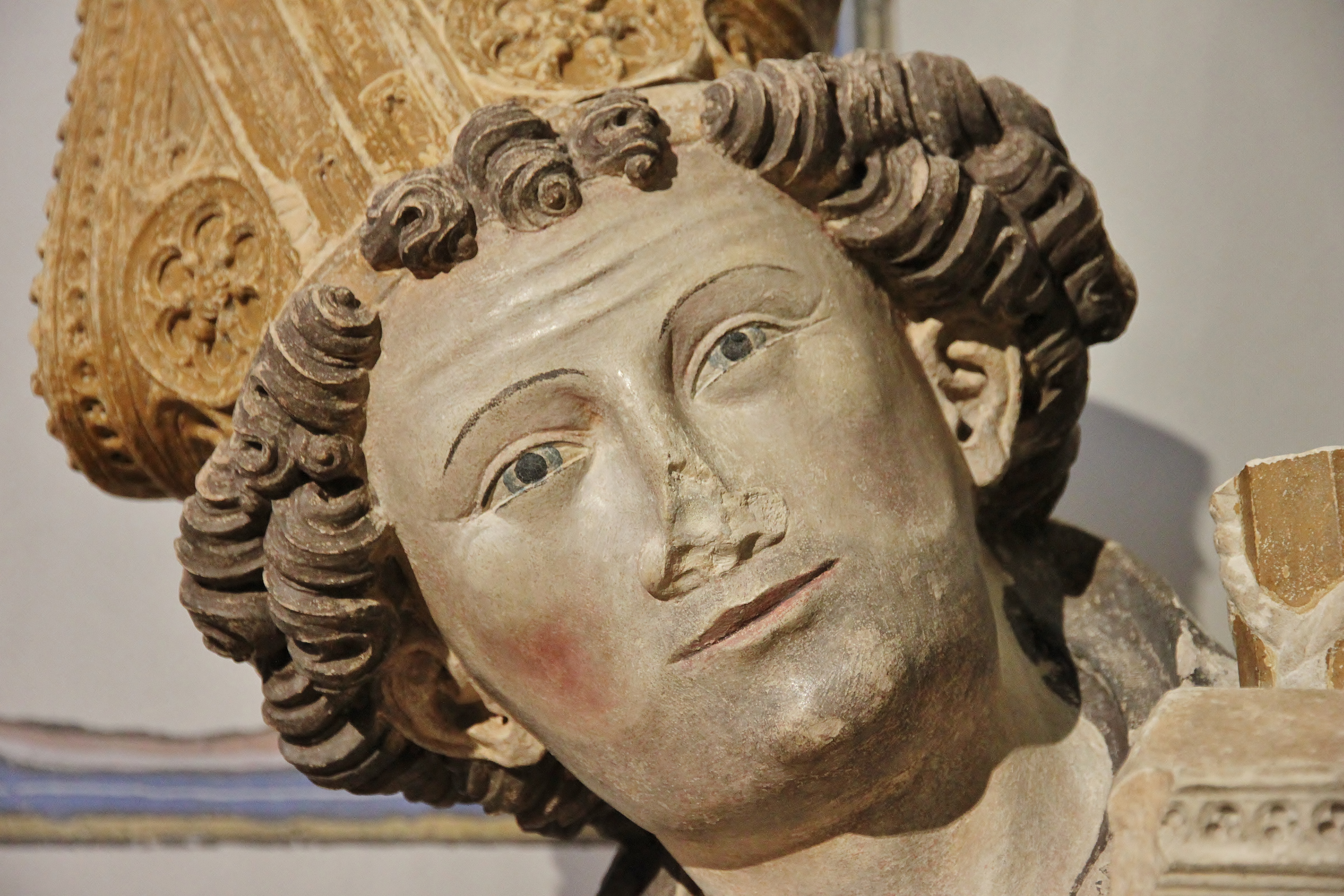
Bishop Jean Tissendier, detail

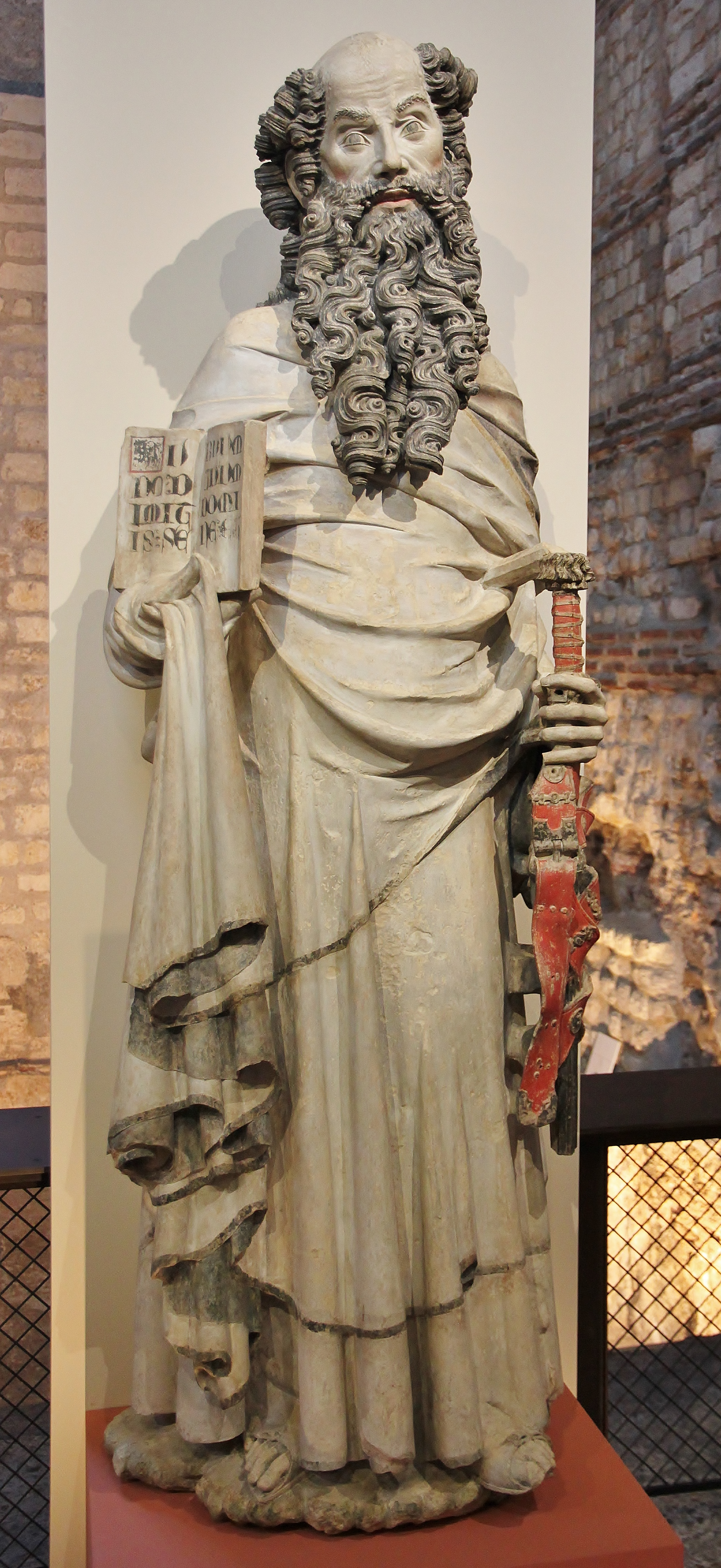
Saint Paul

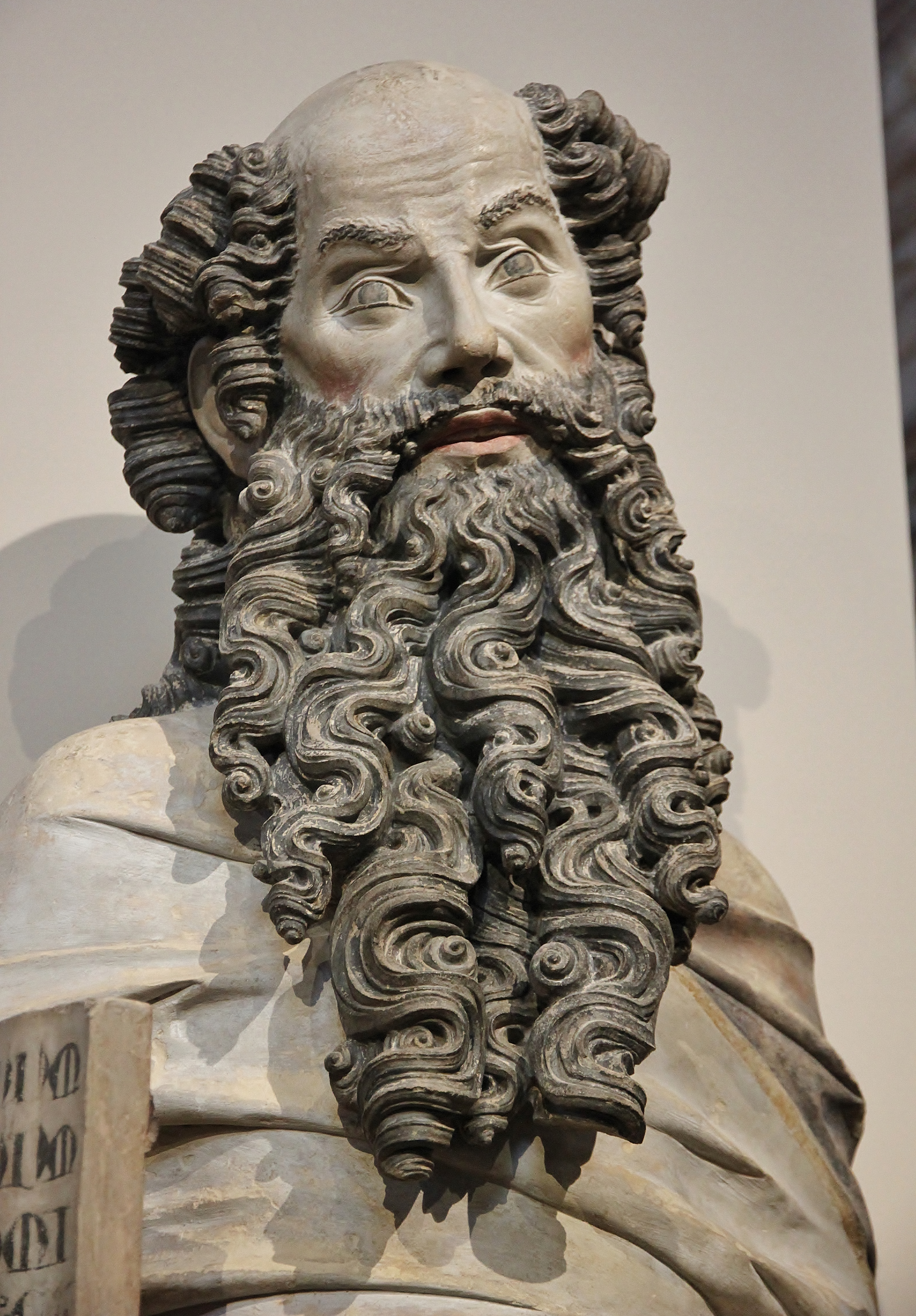
Saint Paul, detail

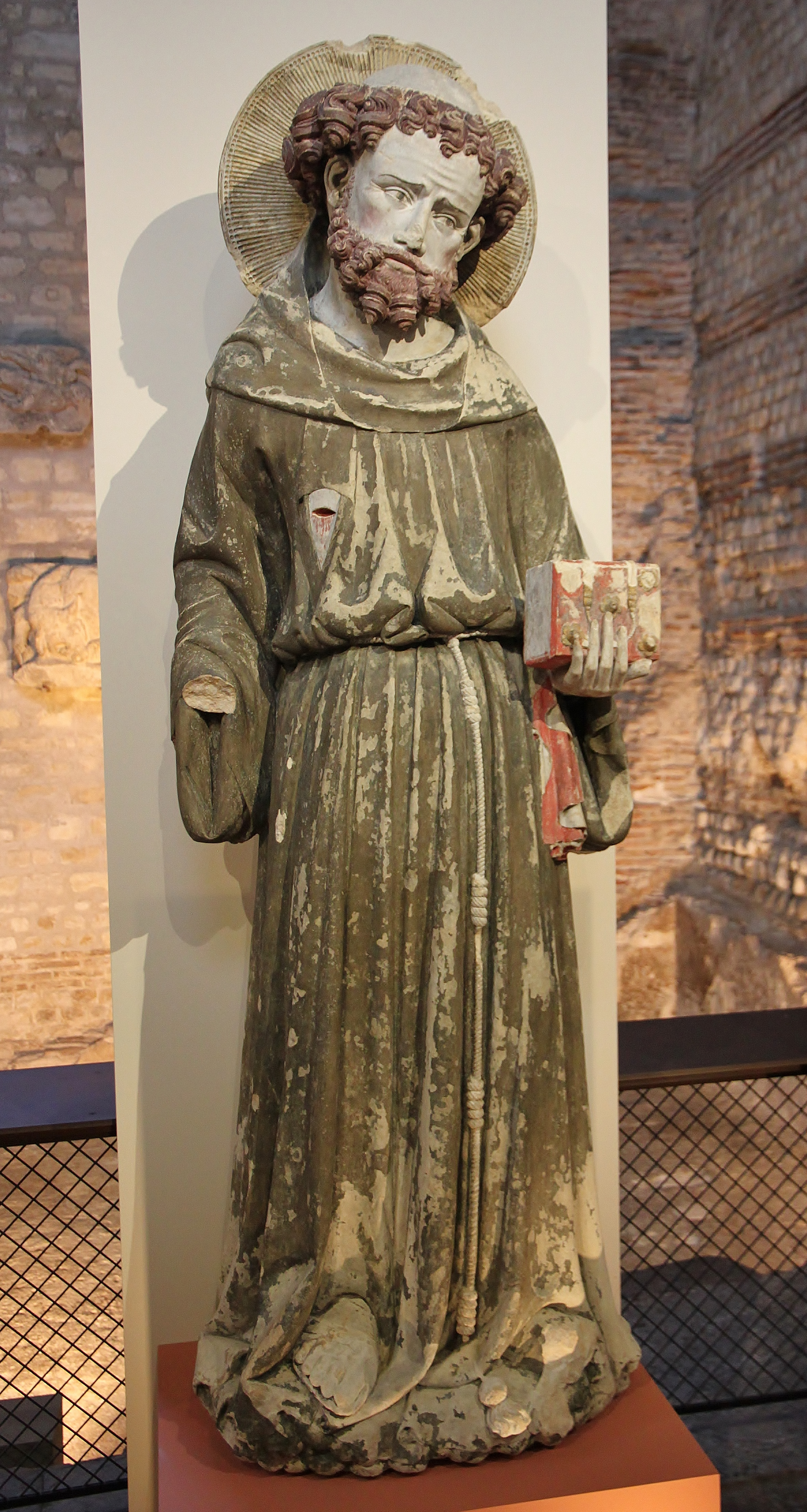
Saint Francis of Assisi

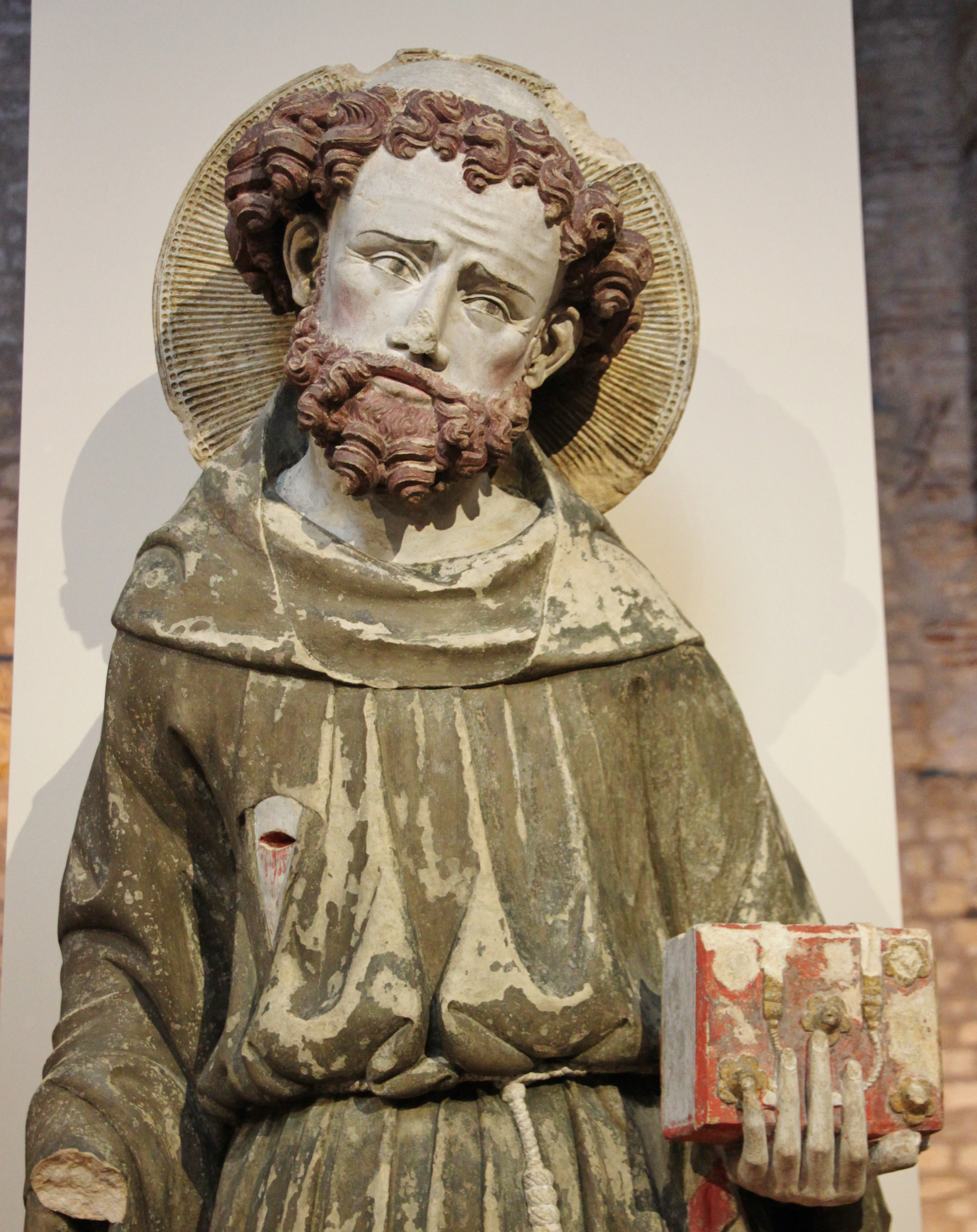
Saint Francis of Assisi, detail

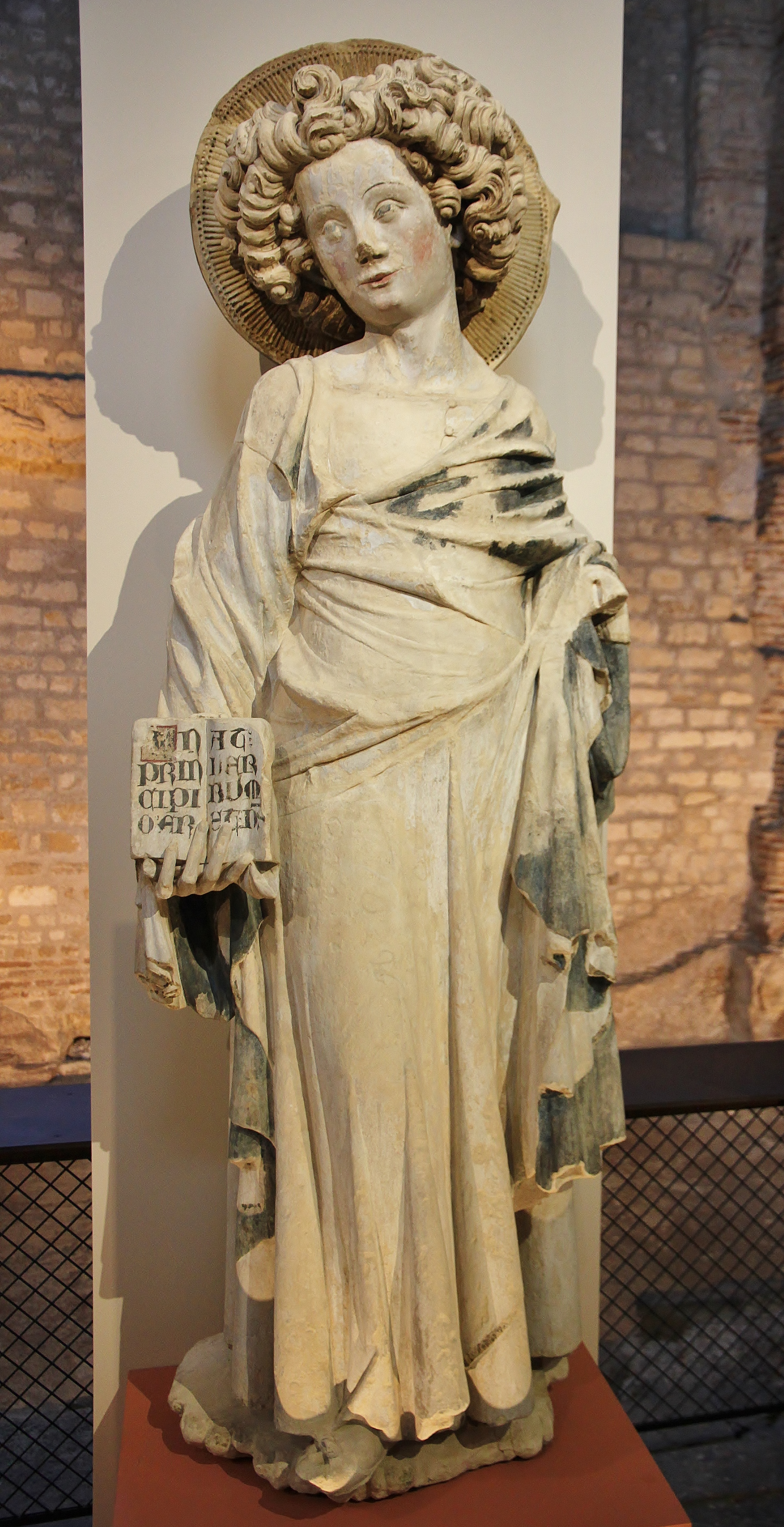
Saint John the Evangelist

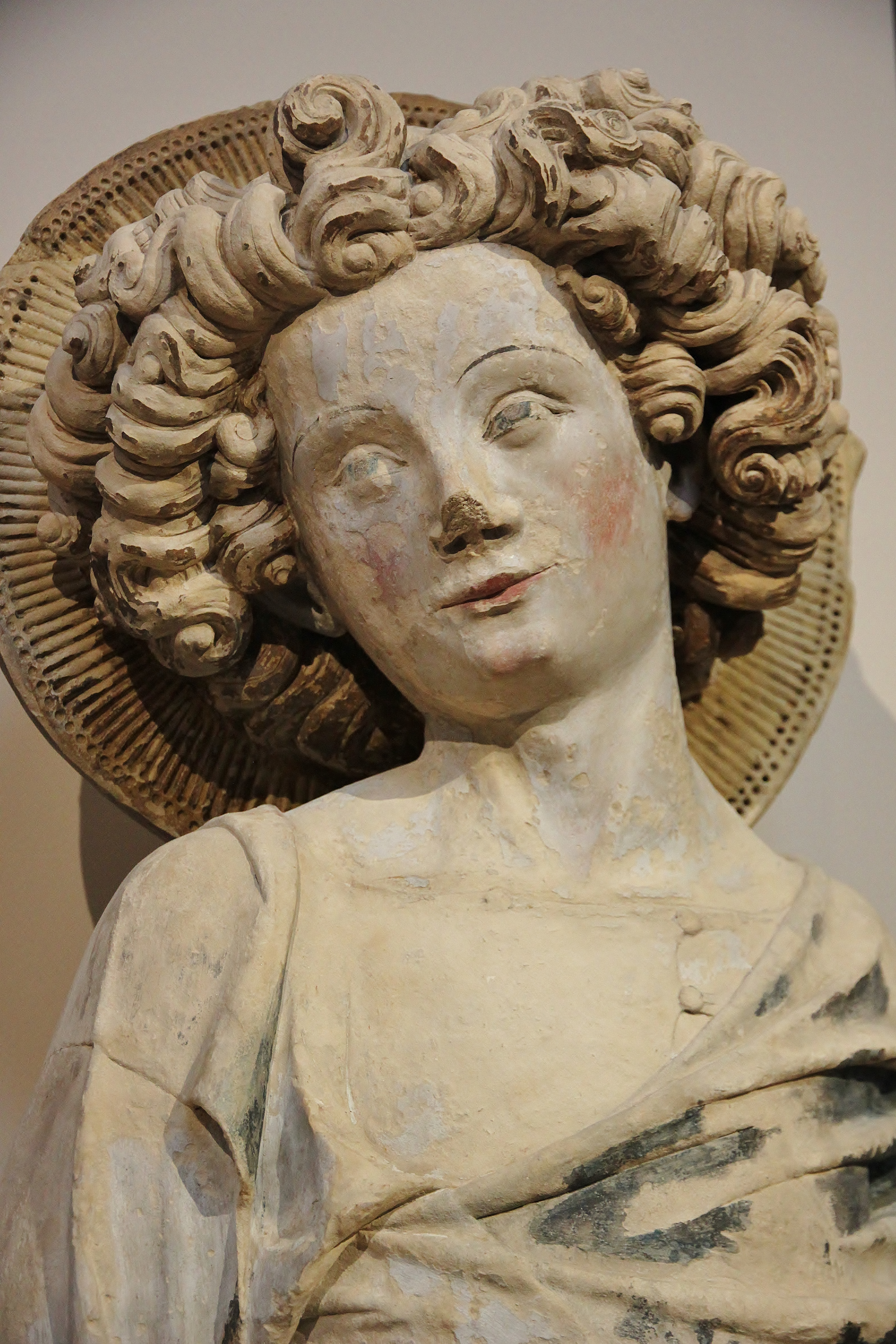
Saint John the Evangelist, detail
