= Nicolas Tournier =

French painter

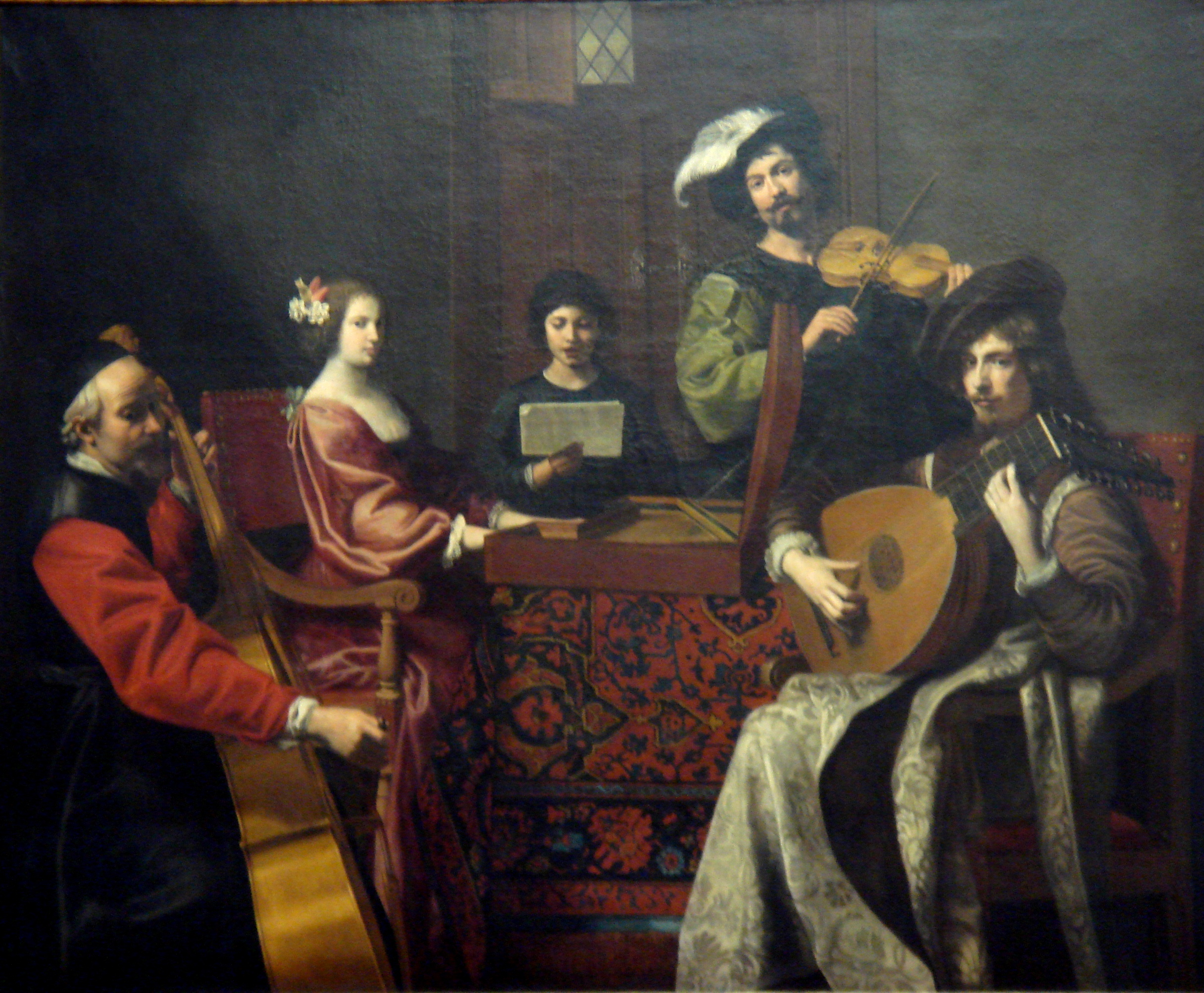
Nicolas Tournier's Le Concert 1630–1635.

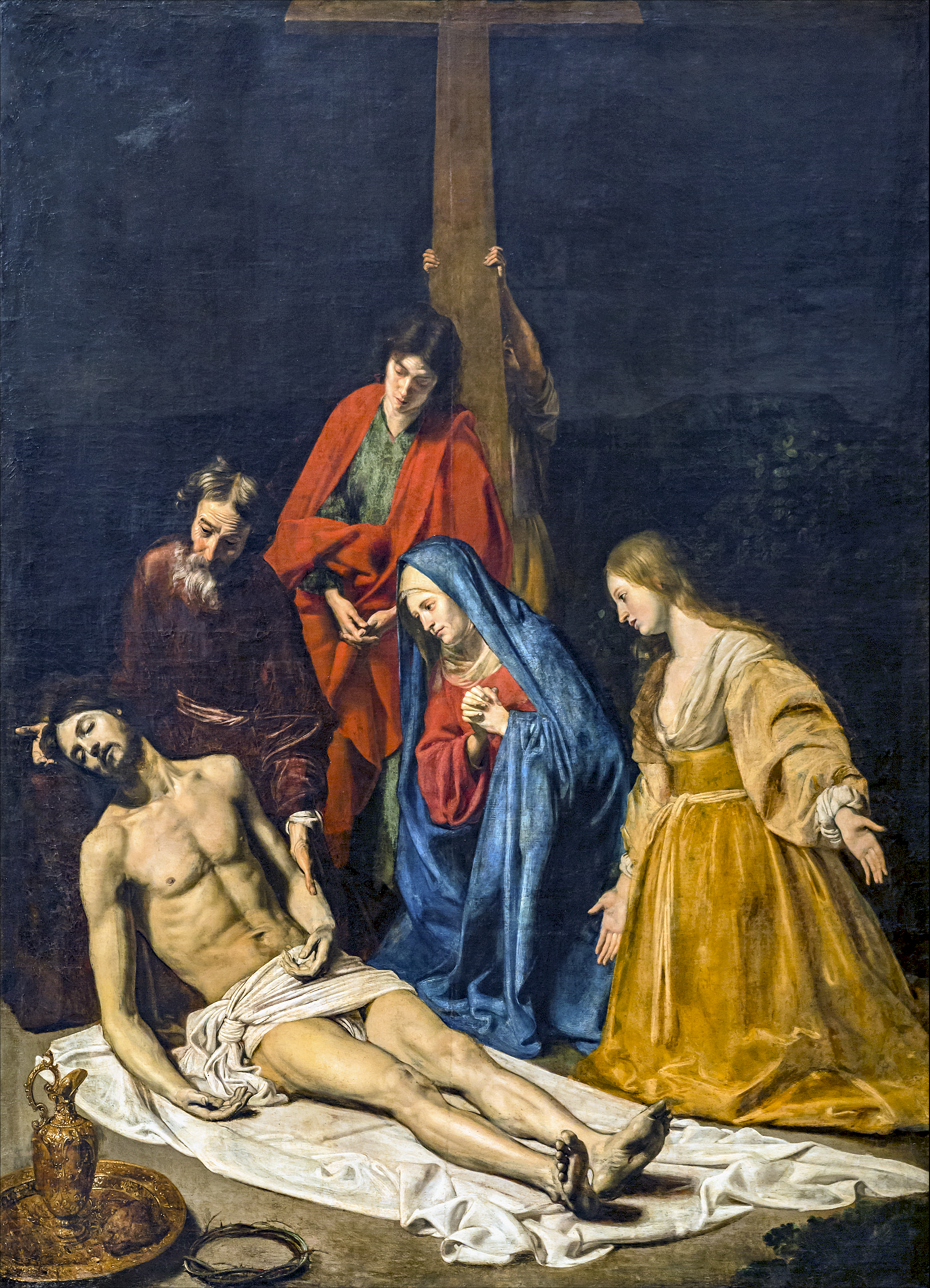
Descent from the Cross

Nicolas Tournier (baptised 12 July 1590 – d. before February 1639) was a French Baroque painter.

Born in Montbéliard, he followed the profession of his father, André Tournier, "a Protestant painter from Besançon". Little is known of his life before his arrival in Rome, where he worked between 1619 and 1626, and where he was influenced by the work of Caravaggio. According to one early source, he was a pupil of Valentin de Boulogne. Tournier's Roman paintings are stylistically close to the works of Bartolomeo Manfredi. He painted both secular and religious subjects; an example of the latter is The Crucifixion with St. Vincent de Paul (Paris, The Louvre). After 1626 Tournier was active in southern France. He died in Toulouse.

His work The Carrying of the Cross, painted around 1632, originally hung in the Toulouse chapel of the Company of the Black Penitents. During the French Revolution it was confiscated by the state and moved to a museum, from where it was stolen in 1818. After being lost for nearly two centuries, it reappeared in 2009 during an art collector's estate sale in Florence; when the Weiss Gallery of London purchased it in a Paris auction in 2011, the French government classified it as stolen property and banned it from leaving the country.

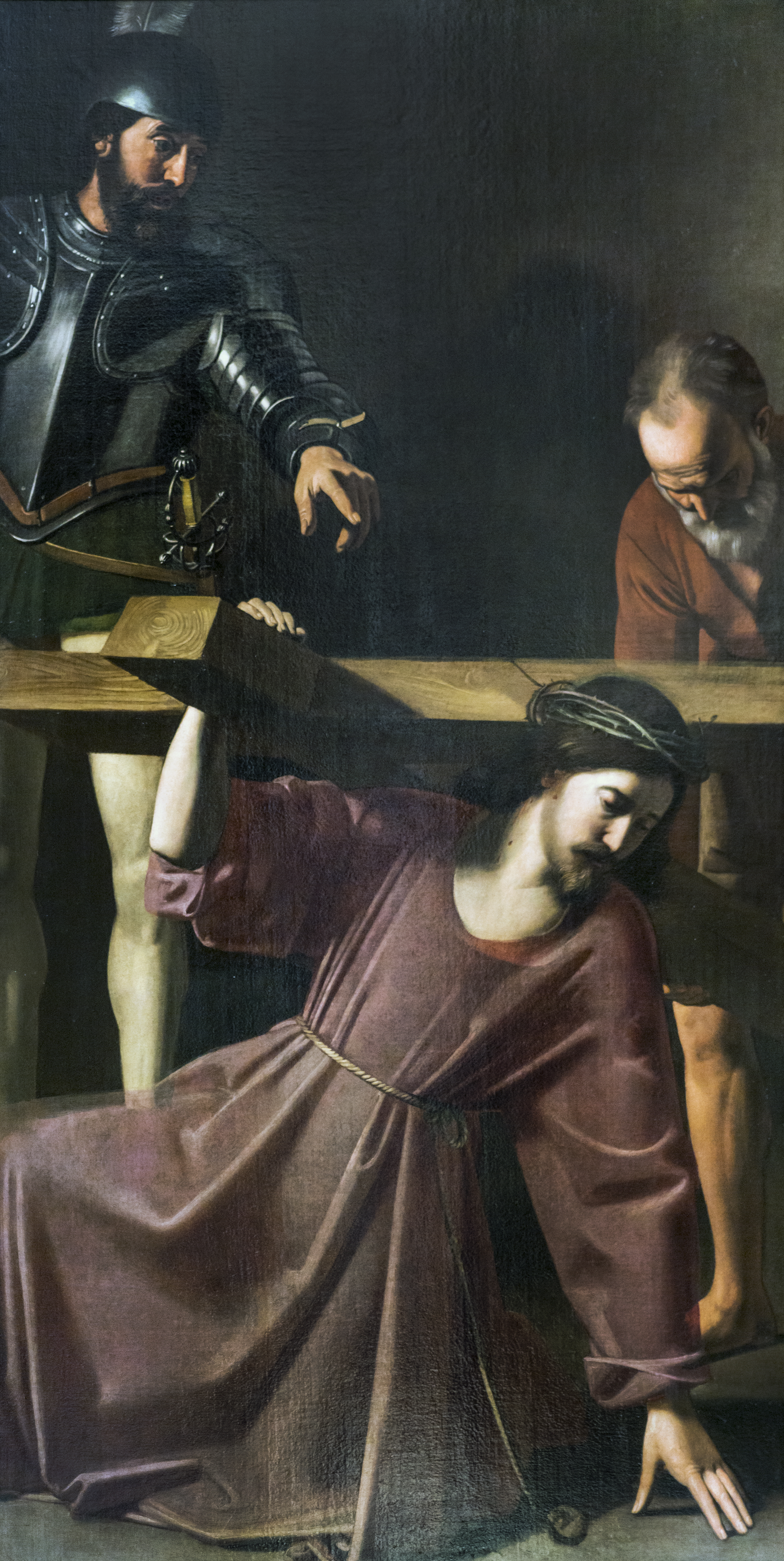
The bearing of the cross, Musée des Augustins
