= Musée des Augustins =

Museum in France

Musée des Augustins de Toulouse
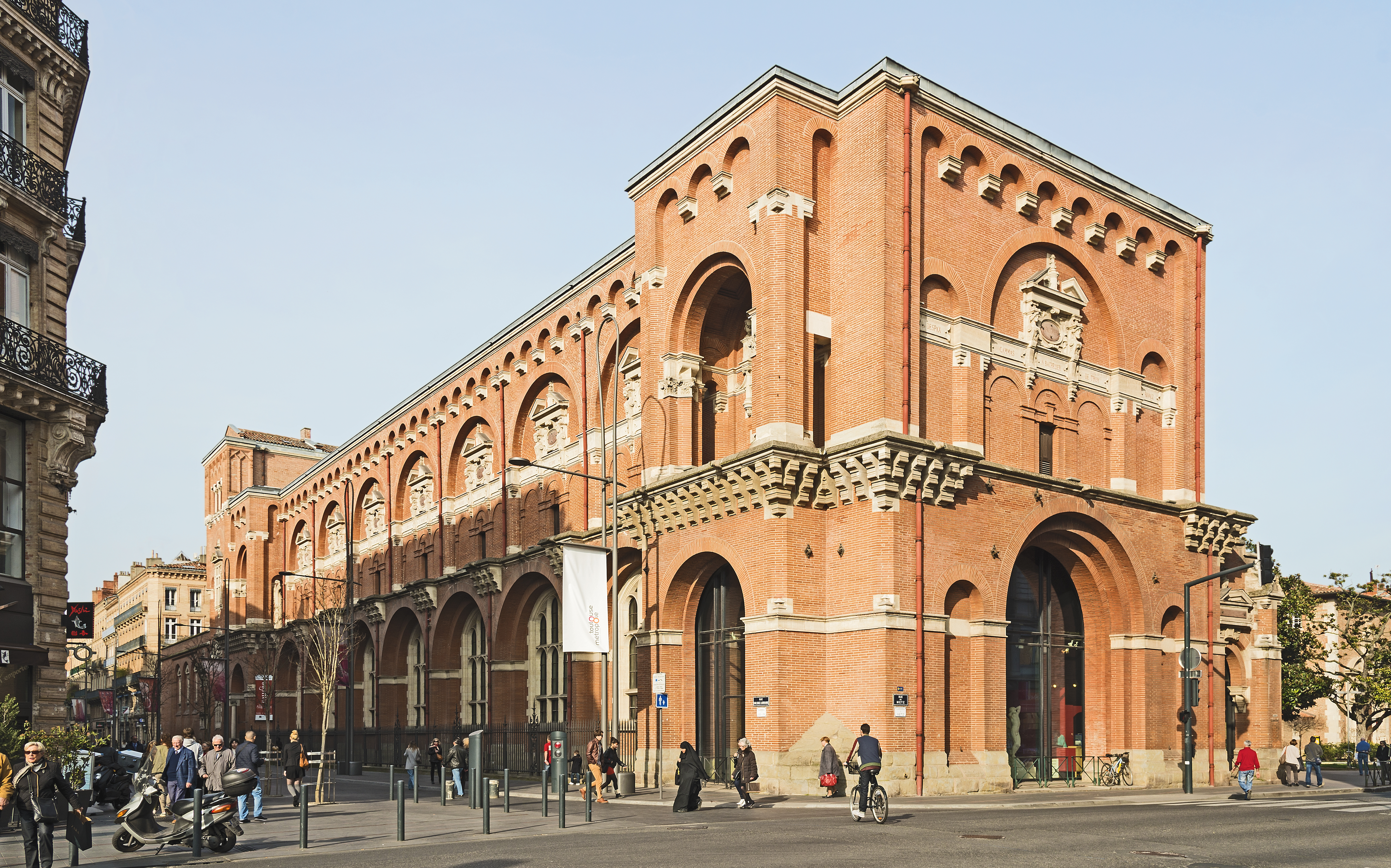
- The Musée des Augustins de Toulouse seen from Rue d'Alsace Lorraine

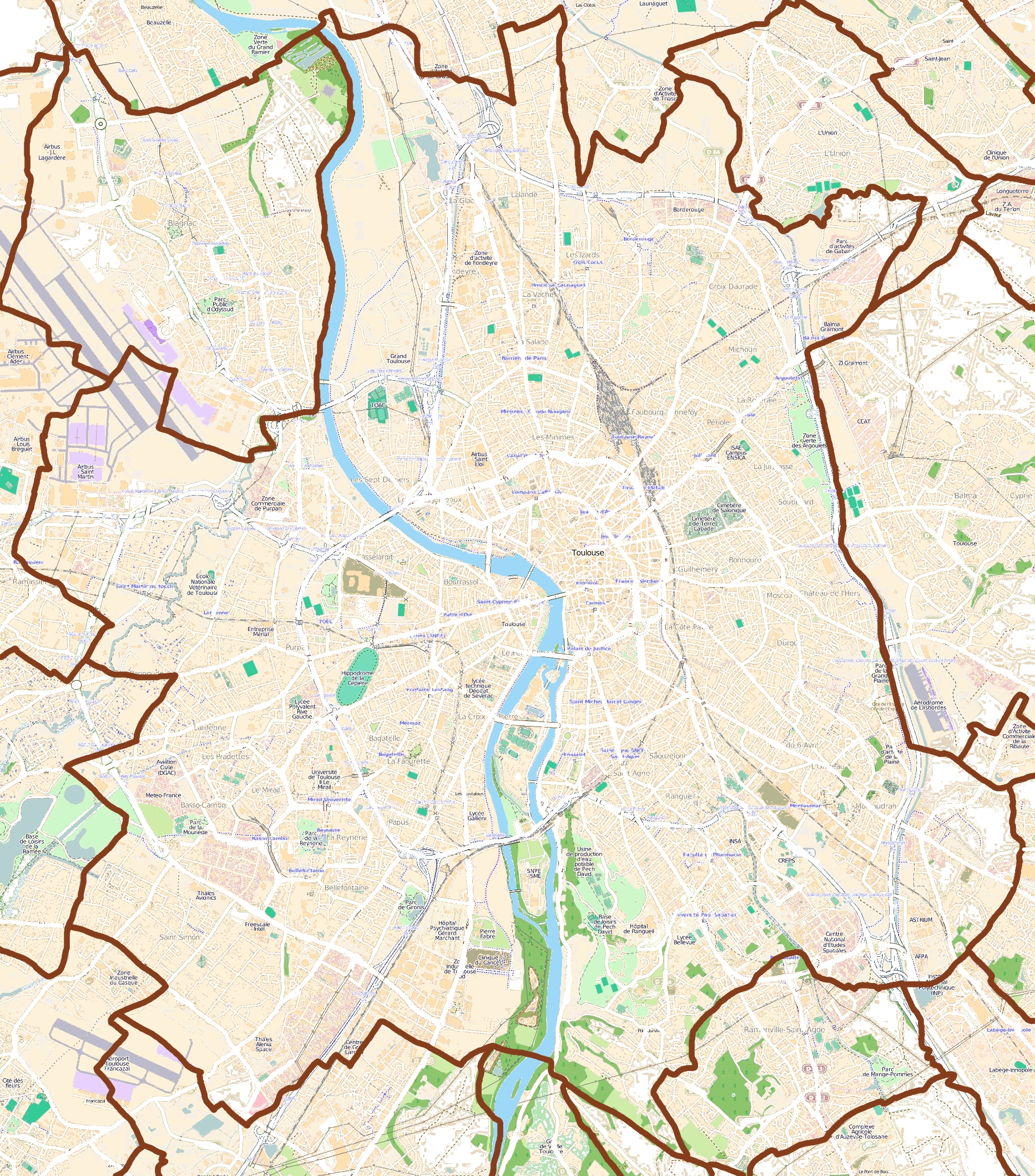
- Location within Toulouse
- Established: 31 August 1801
- Location: Toulouse, France
- Coordinates: 43.601000°N 1.446000°E
- Type: Fine arts
- Director: Axel Hémery
- Website: http://www.augustins.org/en/

The Musée des Augustins de Toulouse (French pronunciation: [myze dez‿oɡystɛ̃ də tuluz]; Occitan: Musèu dels Augustins de Tolosa) is a fine arts museum in Toulouse, France which conserves a collection of sculpture and paintings from the Middle Ages to the early 20th century. The paintings are from throughout France, the sculptures representing Occitan culture of the region with a particularly rich assemblage of Romanesque sculpture.

== History ==
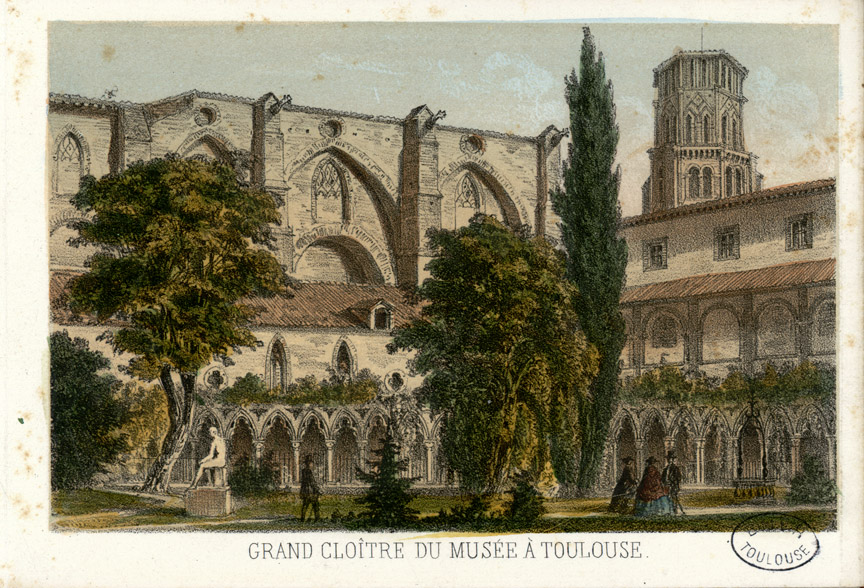
A 19th-century illustration of the Musée des Augustins de Toulouse

The building in which the museum is sited was built in 1309, in the Gothic style and prior to the French Revolution housed Toulouse's Augustinian convent. In its current location, within the walls of the city, the convent of the Augustins of Toulouse was built from 1310 after the authorization of Pope Clement V given by a rescript dated January 28, 1310. The convent was secularized in 1793, and first opened to the public as a museum on 27 August 1795 by decree of the French Convention, very shortly after the opening of the Louvre, making it one of the oldest museums in France after the Louvre and the Musée des Beaux Arts in Besançon. It at first housed the Muséum Provisoire du Midi de la République and the école des Beaux-Arts.

The Musée des Augustins de Toulouse was one of fifteen museums founded in provincial centres, by a decree of 13 Fructidor year IX (31 August 1801), which was promulgated by the minister of the interior, Jean-Antoine Chaptal (Arrêté Chaptal du 14 fructidor an IX). At the start of the 19th century, several medieval buildings (notably the refectory) were demolished and in their place Viollet-le-Duc and his pupil Darcy put up new exhibition galleries, accessed by a Gothic Revival monumental stair offering an interplay of richly complicated vaulting systems. The works continued from 1873 to 1901, when the museum reopened. In effect, Toulouse commissioned Urbain Vitry to ensure remove all the convent's religious characteristics. The archaeologist Alexandre Du Mège occupied the cloister and rebuilt it to be able to house the medieval collections gathered from Toulouse's destroyed religious buildings such as the basilique Saint-Sernin. Today the cloister houses a reconstructed medieval garden. The building was classed as a Monument historique in 1840.

== Collections ==
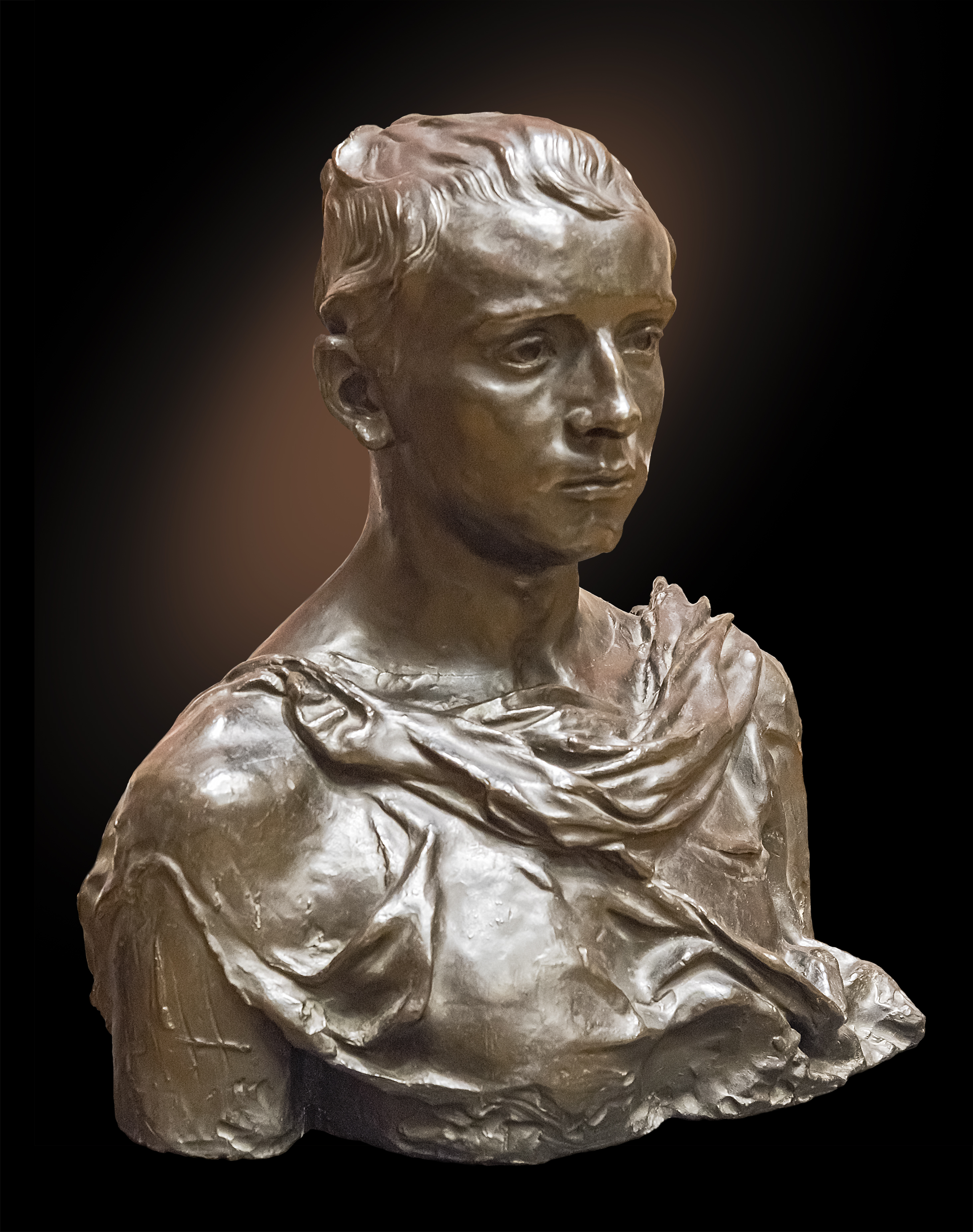
Paul Claudel aged sixteen by Camille Claudel, modeled in 1884 and cast in 1893

The progressive concern of the museum's founder Jean-Antoine Chaptal, an early example of cultural devolution, was intended to ensure that "each collection presents an interesting series of paintings representing all the masters, all the genres and all the schools". In a series of shipments culminating in 1811, Toulouse was enriched with works by Guercino, Pietro Perugino, Rubens and Philippe de Champaigne.

The collections total over 4,000 works and their core derives from confiscation of Church property at the time of the French Revolution as well as seizures of the private collections of émigrés, in Toulouse notably the paintings of the cardinal de Bernis and Louis-Auguste le Tonnelier, baron de Breteuil. The museum's church even houses an organ built in 1981 by Jürgen Ahrend when Denis Milhau was director of the musée between 1963 and 1994.

=== Paintings ===
The French schools of the 15th to 18th centuries are represented by Philippe de Champaigne, Louise Moillon, Valentin de Boulogne, Sébastien Bourdon, Jacques Stella, Pierre Mignard, Jean Jouvenet, Hyacinthe Rigaud, Nicolas de Largillierre, Jean-François de Troy, Pierre Subleyras, Jean-Baptiste Oudry, Claude Joseph Vernet, Élisabeth-Louise Vigée-Lebrun, Pierre-Henri de Valenciennes, Antoine-Jean Gros and Jean-Antoine Houdon, as well as painters from Toulouse and its region, such as Nicolas Tournier, Antoine and Jean-Pierre Rivalz, François de Troy and Joseph Roques. Many French 19th- and 20th-century painting are also represented, with works by Gabriel Guay, Toulouse-Lautrec, Ingres, Delacroix, Camille Corot, Gustave Courbet, Jean-Léon Gérôme, Manet, Berthe Morisot, Vuillard, Maurice Denis and Maurice Utrillo. The painting collection also includes works by Spanish, Dutch and Italian artists. The Italian holdings span from the 14th to the 18th century with works by Neri di Bicci, Lorenzo Monaco, Pietro Perugino, Jacopo Zucchi, Guido Reni, Guercino, Bernardo Strozzi, Baciccio, Carlo Maratta, Crespi, Francesco Solimena, Guardi. Flemish and Dutch painting is represented with paintings by Cornelis van Haarlem, Rubens, Anthony van Dyck, Jacob Jordaens, Jan van Goyen, Aelbert Cuyp, Pieter Coecke van Aelst and Cornelis van Poelenburgh while for Spain the museum notably displays one painting by Bartolomé Esteban Murillo.

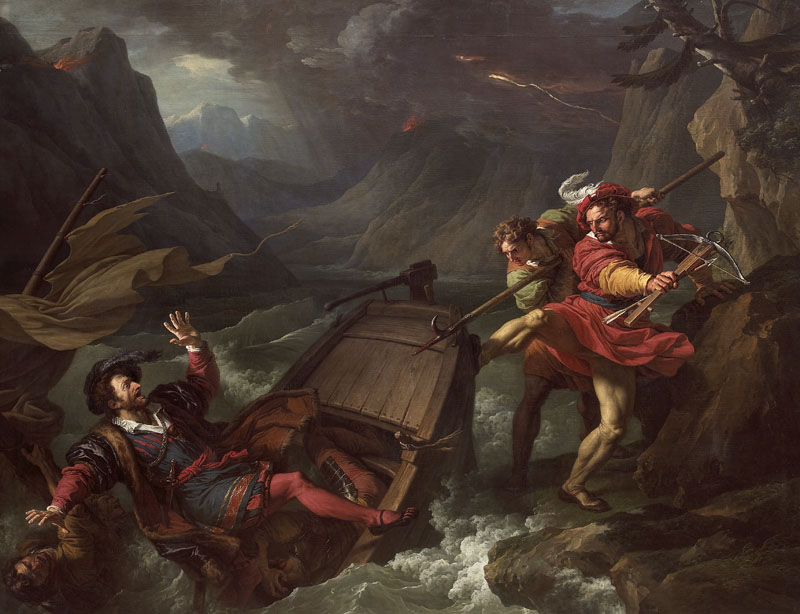
François-André Vincent, William Tell Overturning the Barque of Gessler (1795)

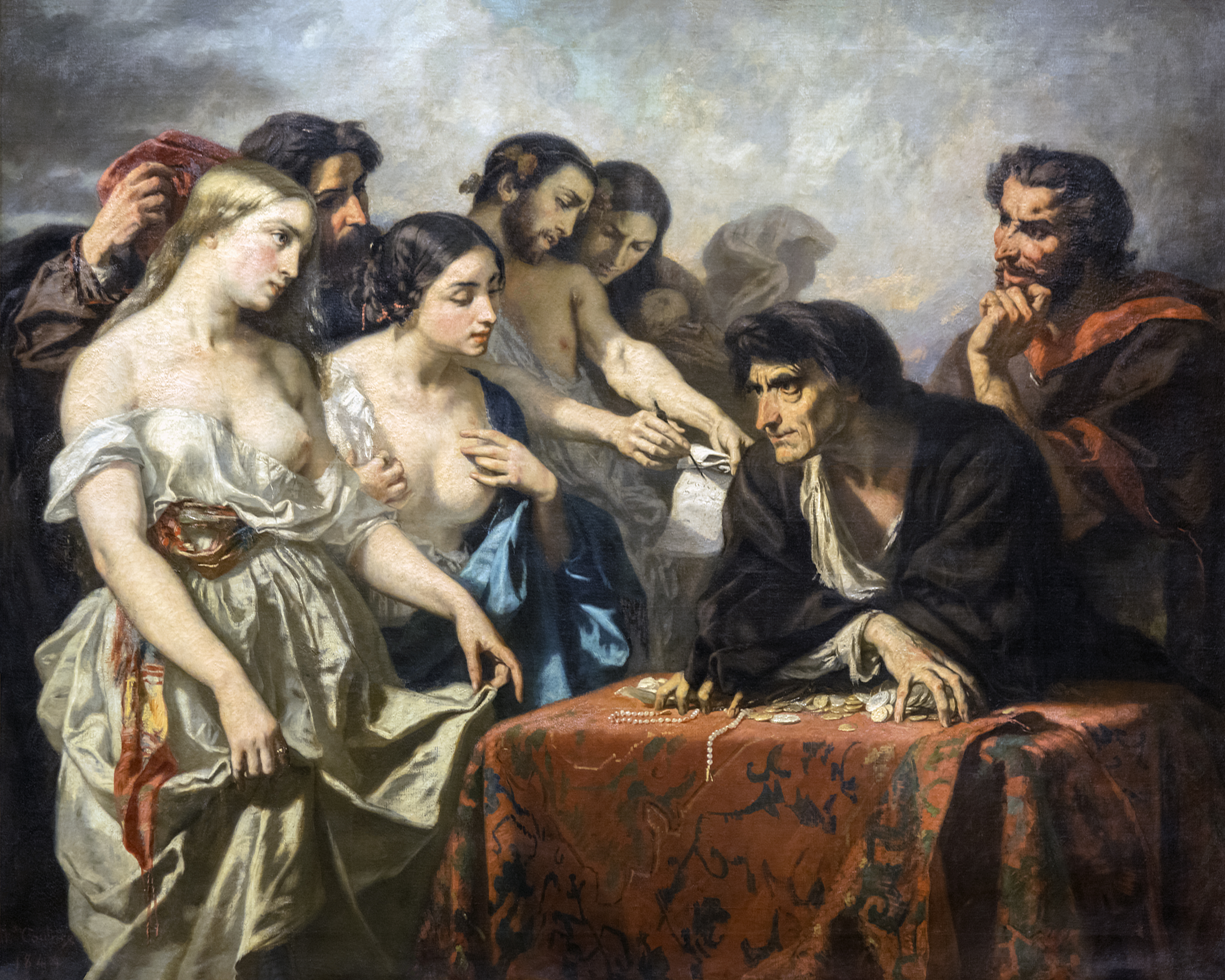
Thomas Couture, The Love of Gold (1844)

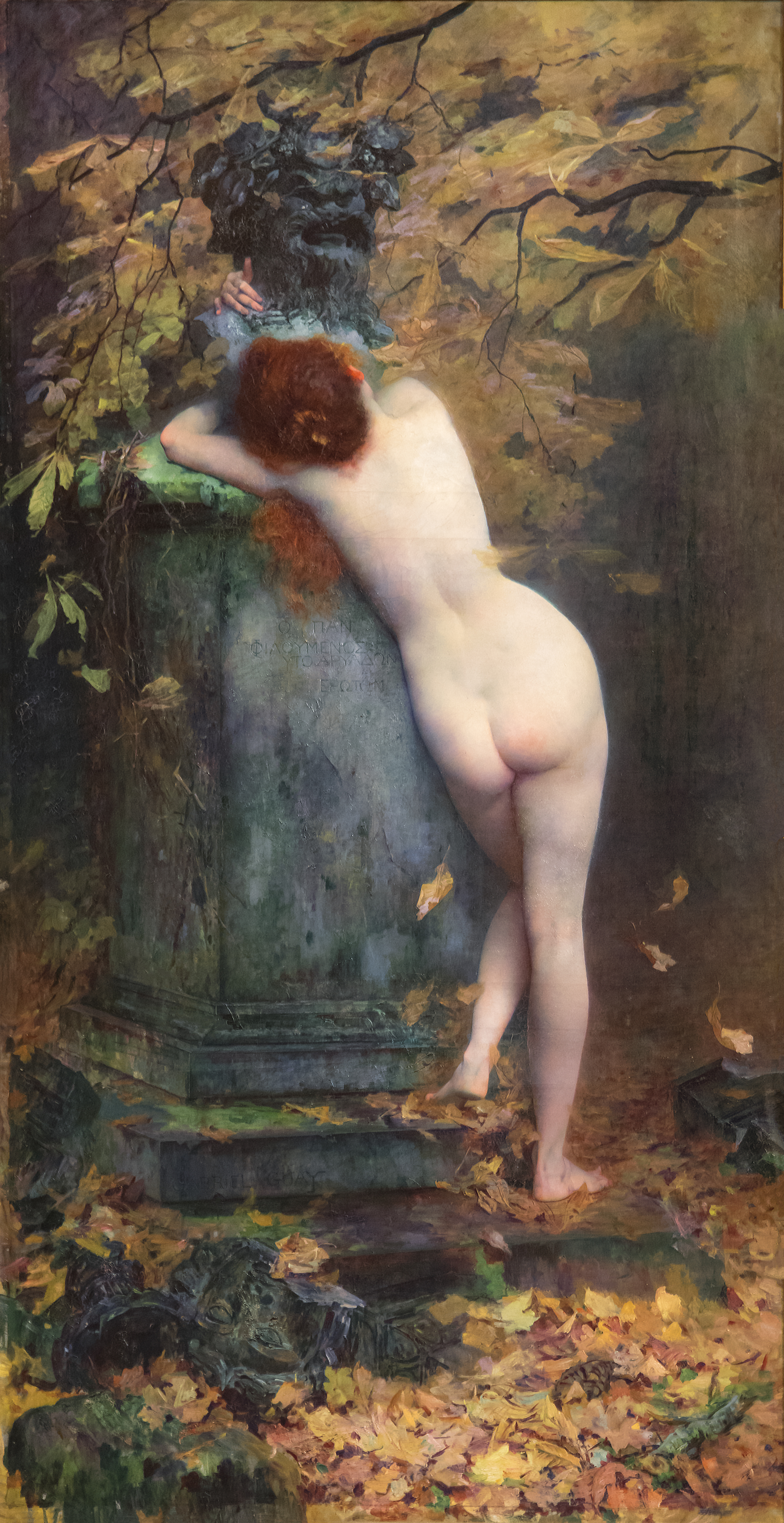
Gabriel Guay, La dernière dryade (1898).

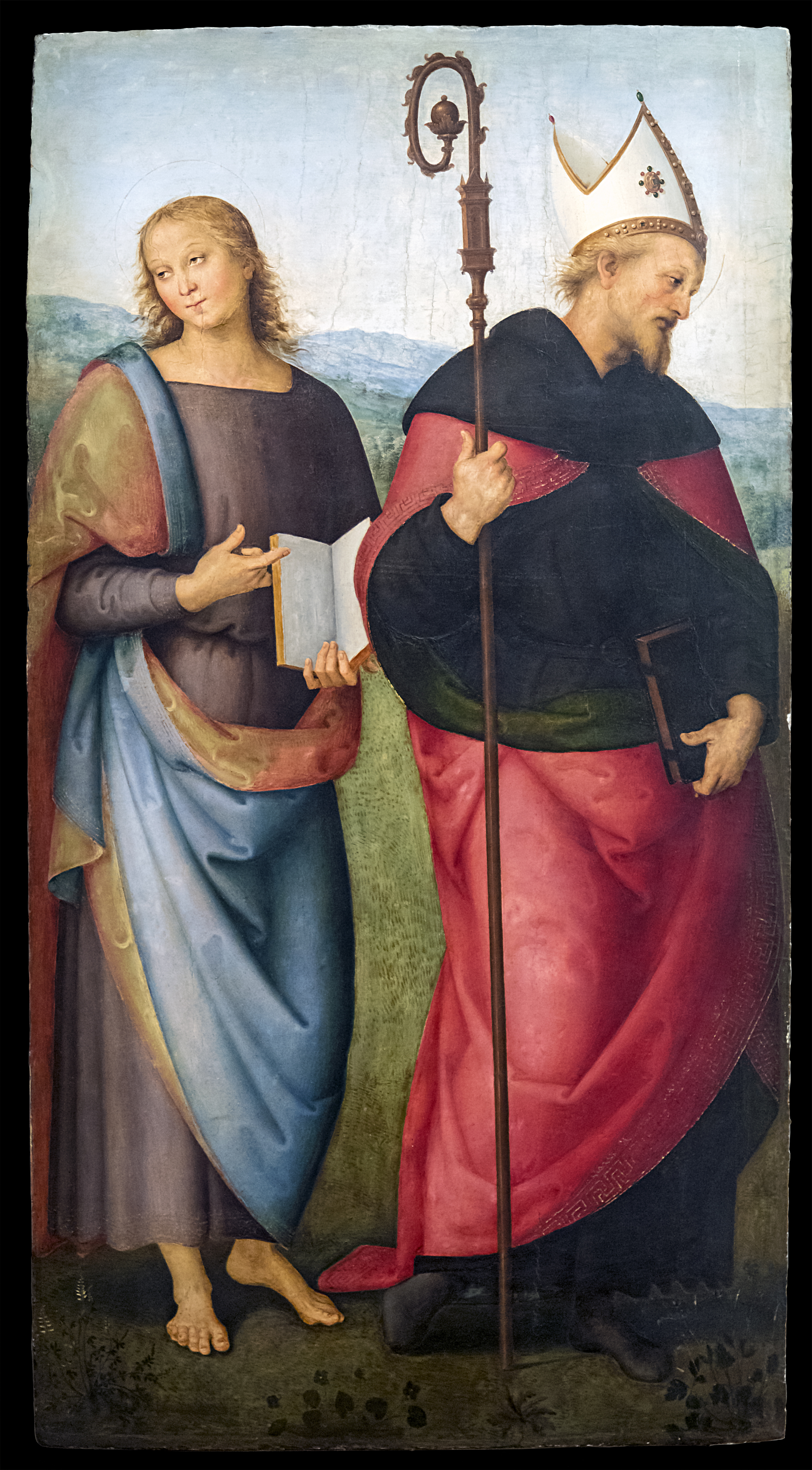
Perugino, Saint John the Evangelist and Saint Augustine (1512-1523).

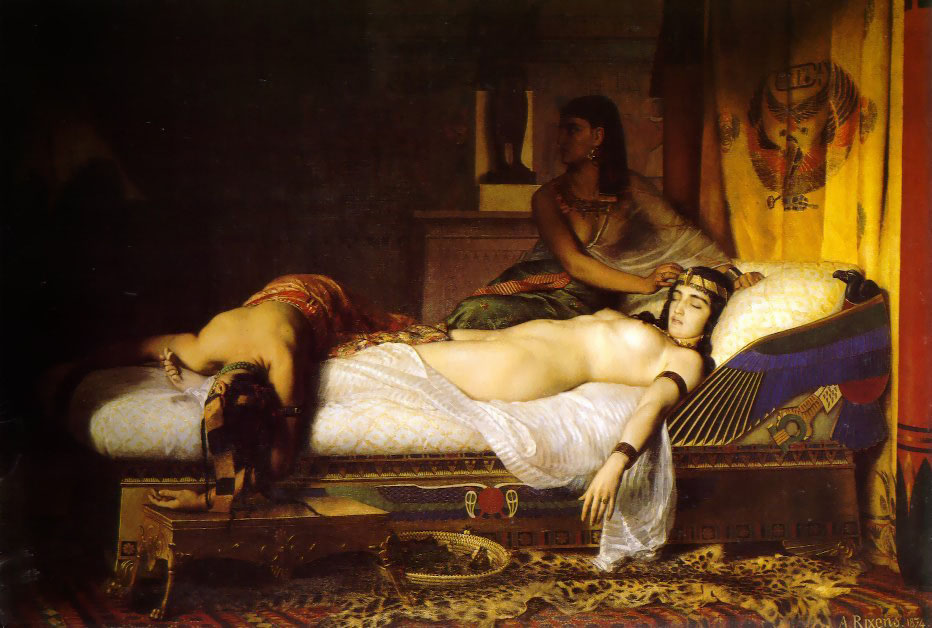
Jean-André Rixens, Death of Cleopatra (1874).

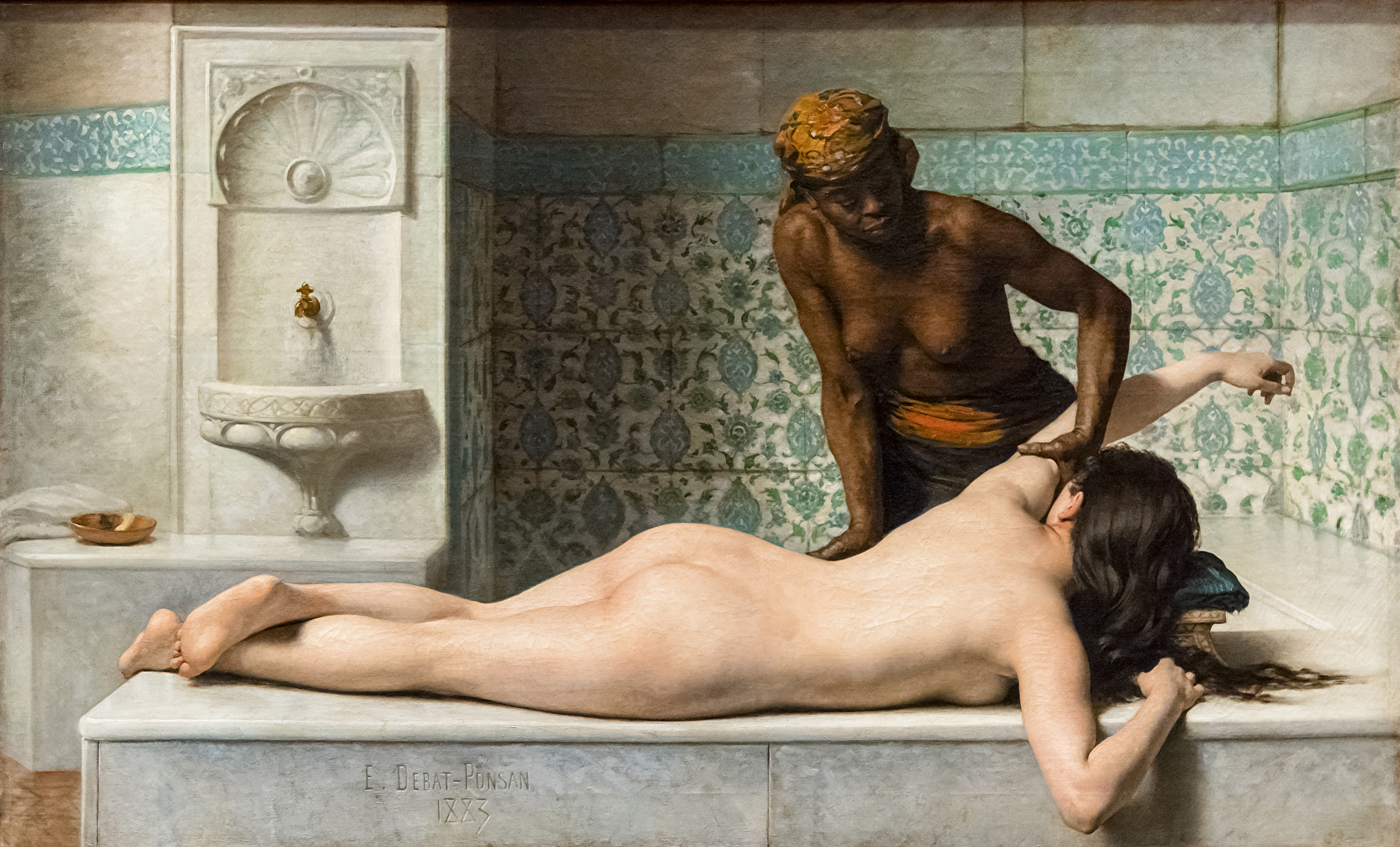
Édouard Debat-Ponsan, The massage

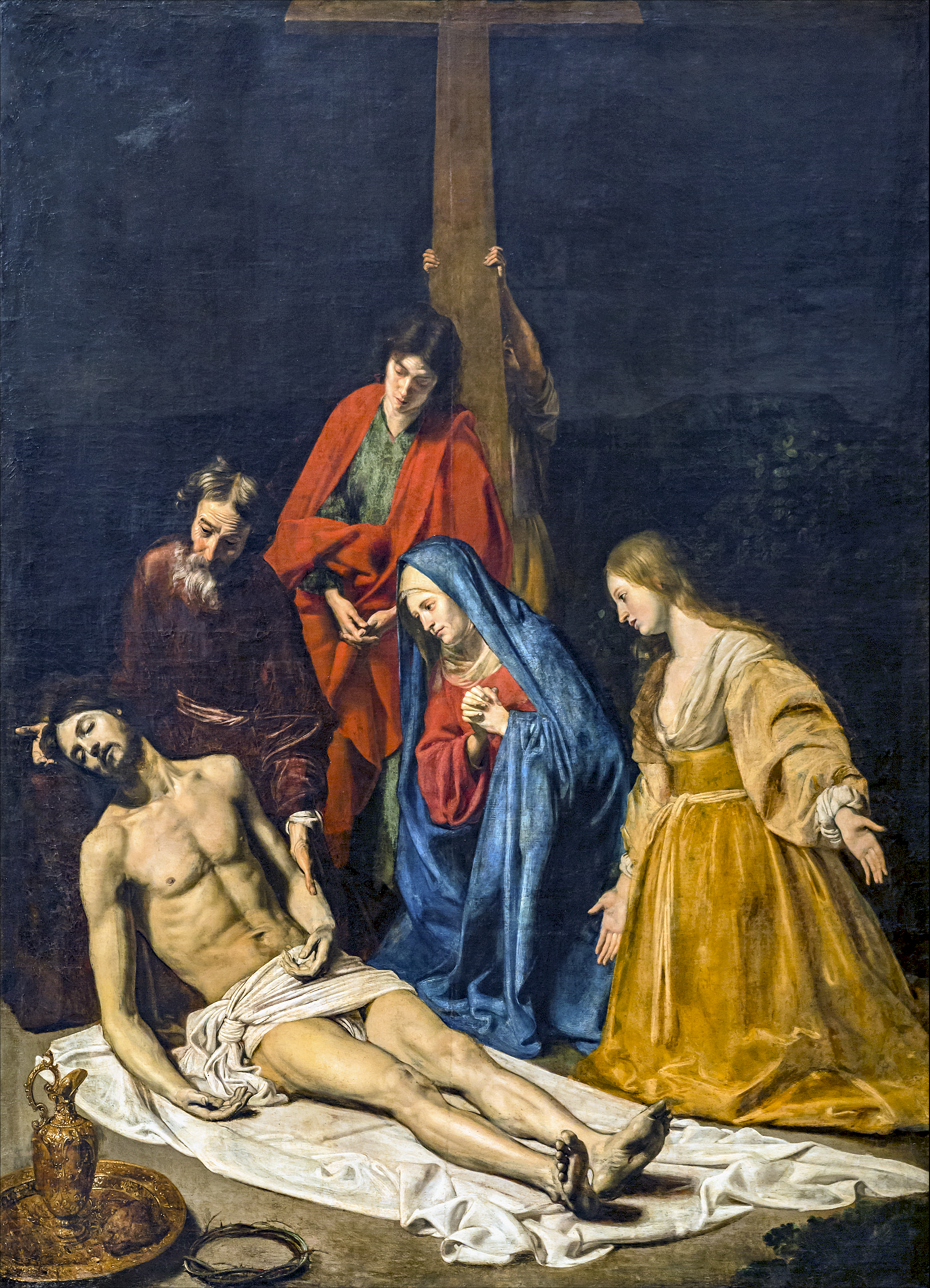
Nicolas Tournier, Descent from the Cross

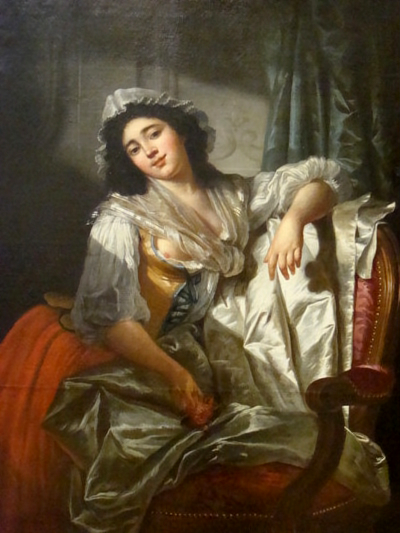
Joseph Roques, Portrait of Madame Sermet

=== Sculpture ===
The museum's sculpture collection is in large part due to the rescue activities of antiquaries and museum curators such as Alexandre du Mège who managed to extricate sculpture from the frequent destruction of religious buildings that marked the 19th century. It is particularly strong in 12th-century Romanesque sculpture from the city's three main religious buildings - the priory of Notre-Dame de la Daurade, the basilica of Saint-Sernin and the cathedral of Saint-Étienne. Jorge Pardo realizes the new presentation of Romanesque sculpture. It also includes many 14th and 15th century locally produced sculptures and eight 16th century terracotta figures from the chapelle de Rieux (Nostre Dame de Grasse and works by the master of Rieux), built around 1340 in the couvent des Cordeliers, as well as gargoyles from the same convent. It also houses 19th century sculpture, with plaster works by Alexandre Falguière and his pupil Antonin Mercié, as well as works by Rodin and a bronze by Camille Claudel.

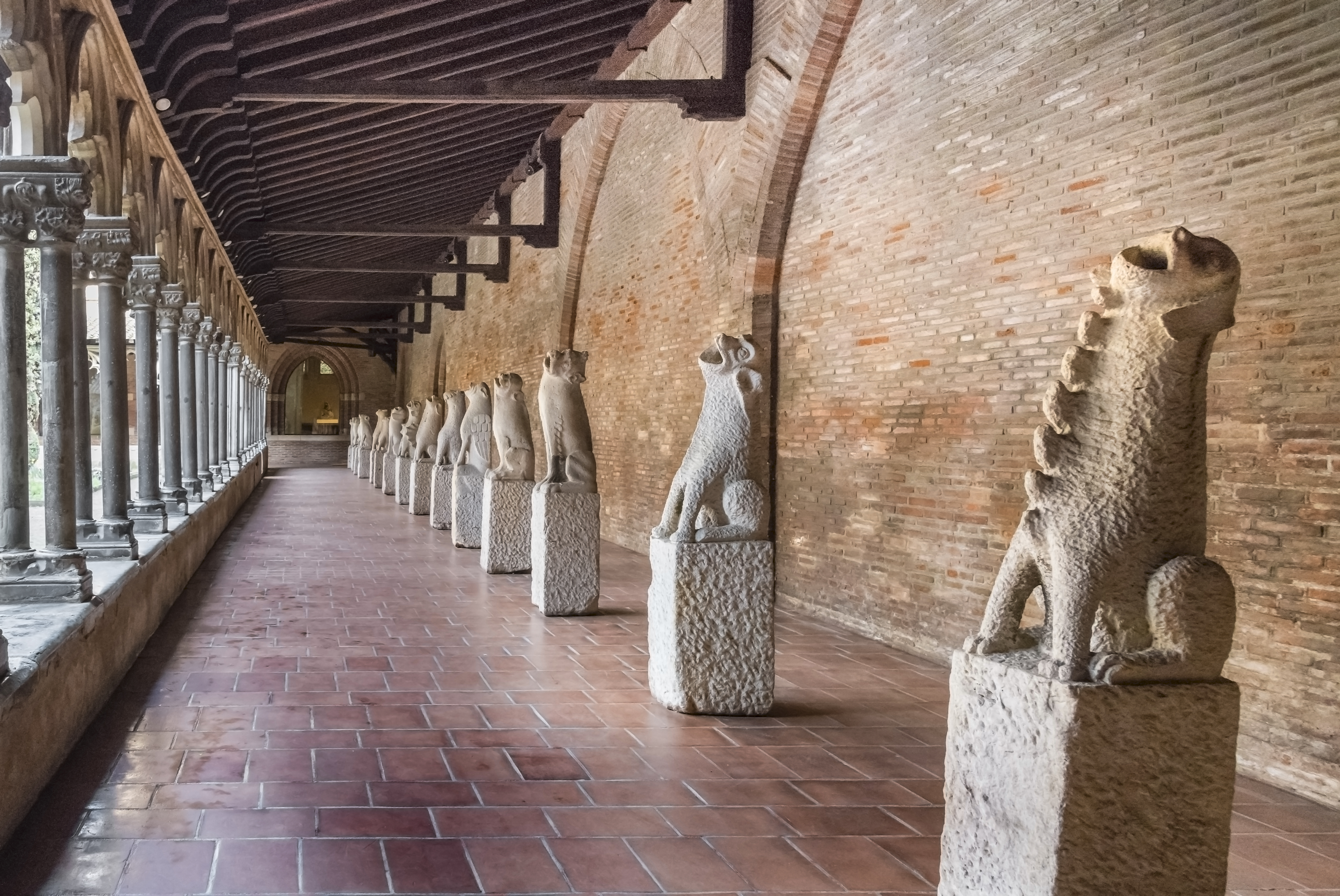
Salvaged gargoyles displayed in the cloister

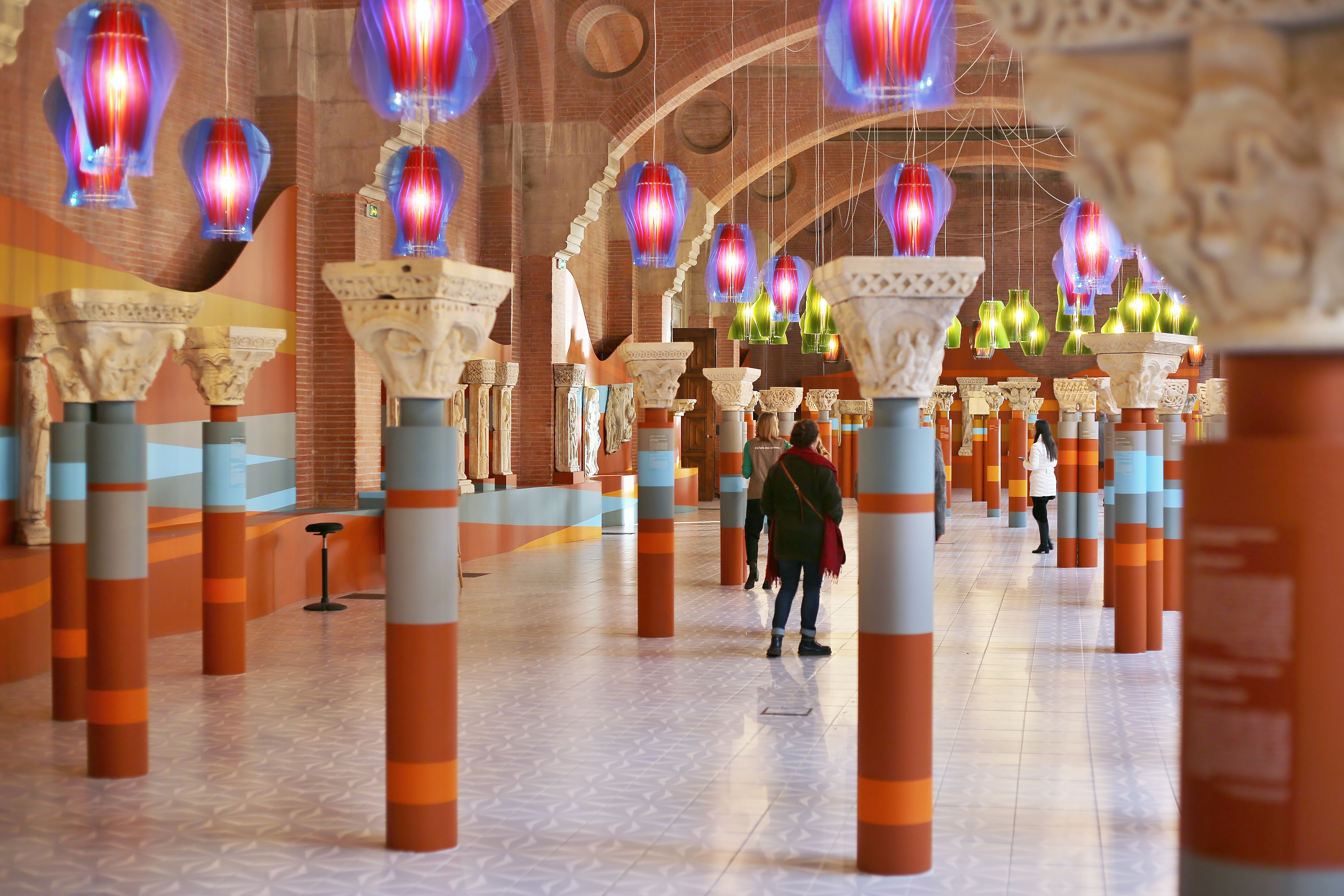
Hall of Romanesque capitals

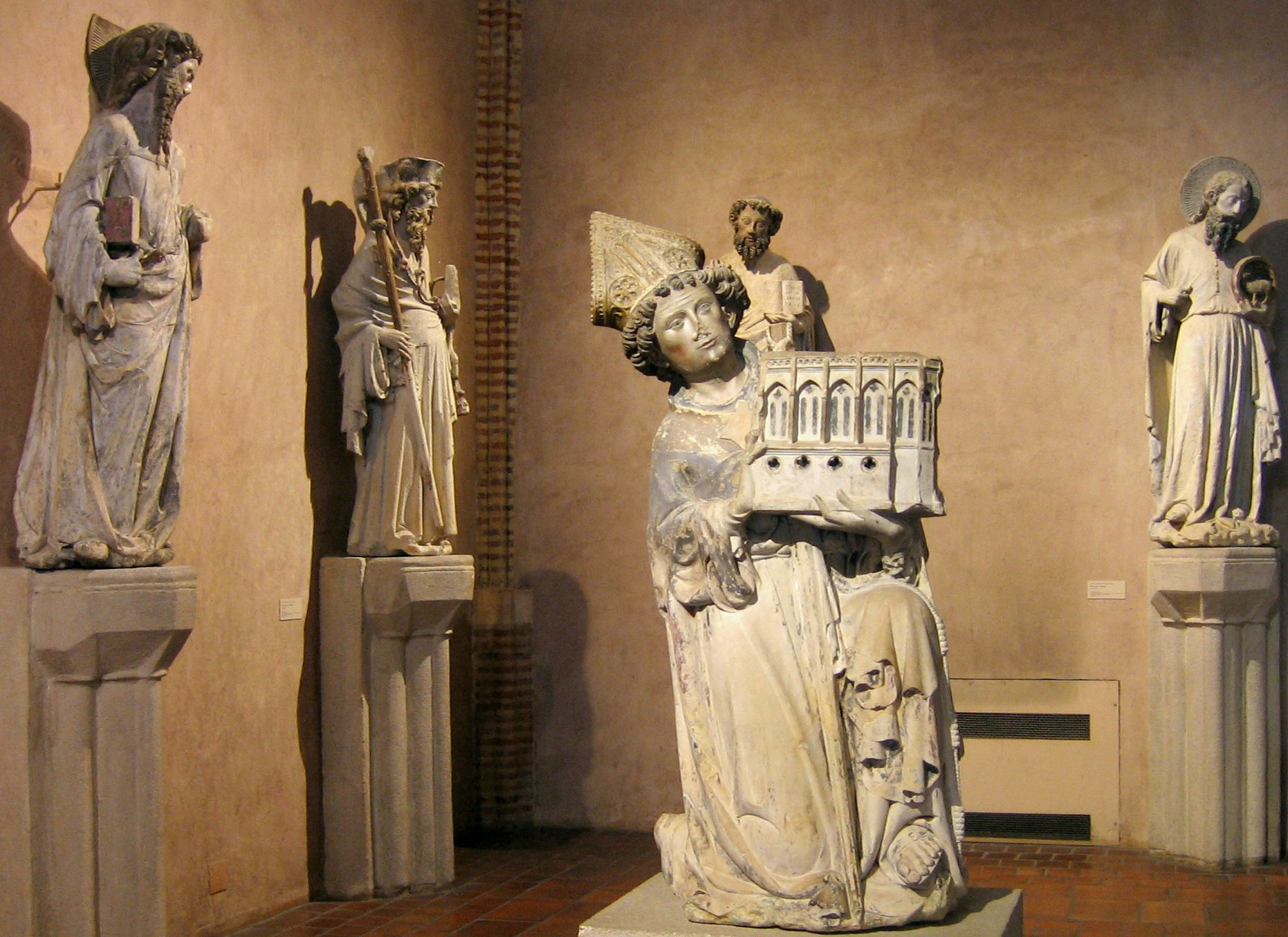
Sculptures by the Master of Rieux - In the foreground, Jean Tissendier, bishop of Rieux

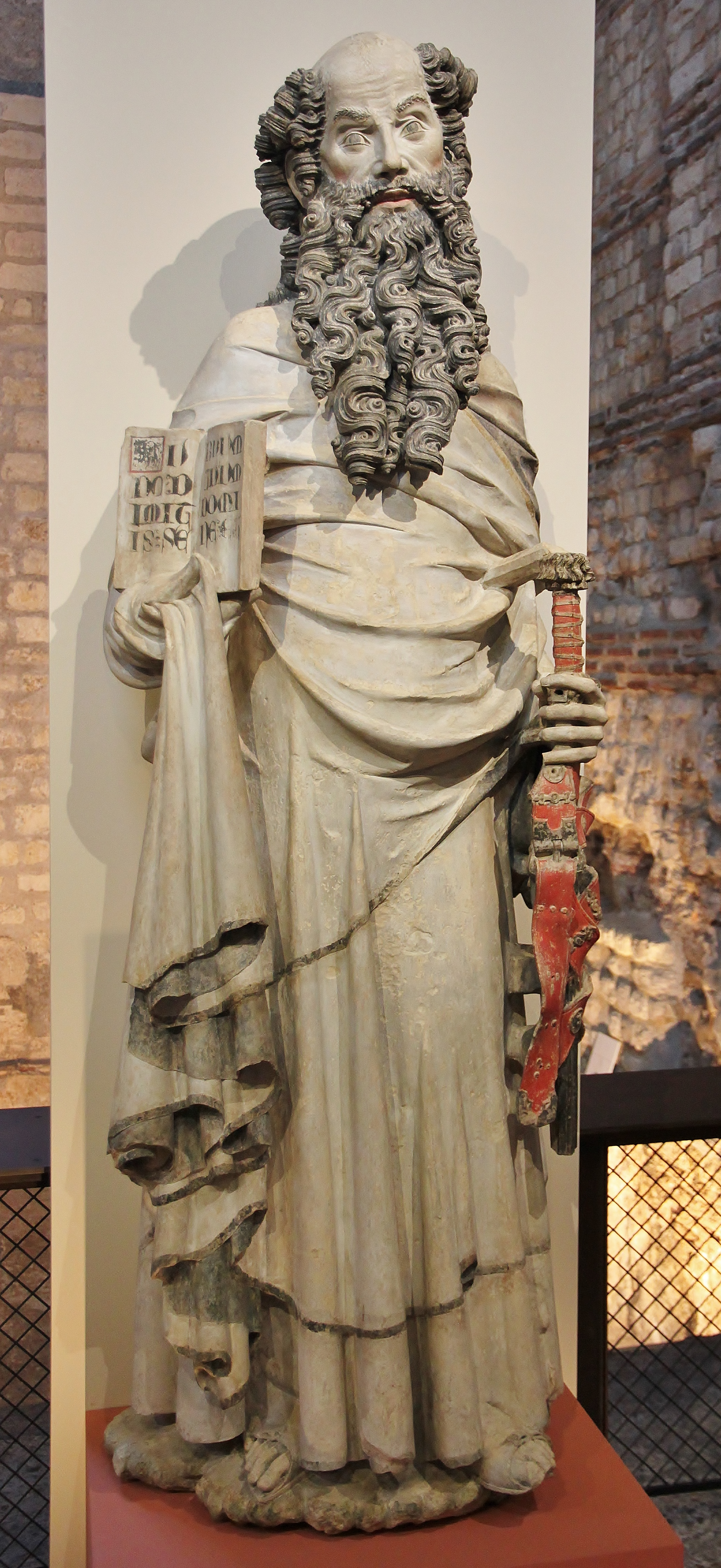
Saint Paul by the Master of Rieux, 1333-1343

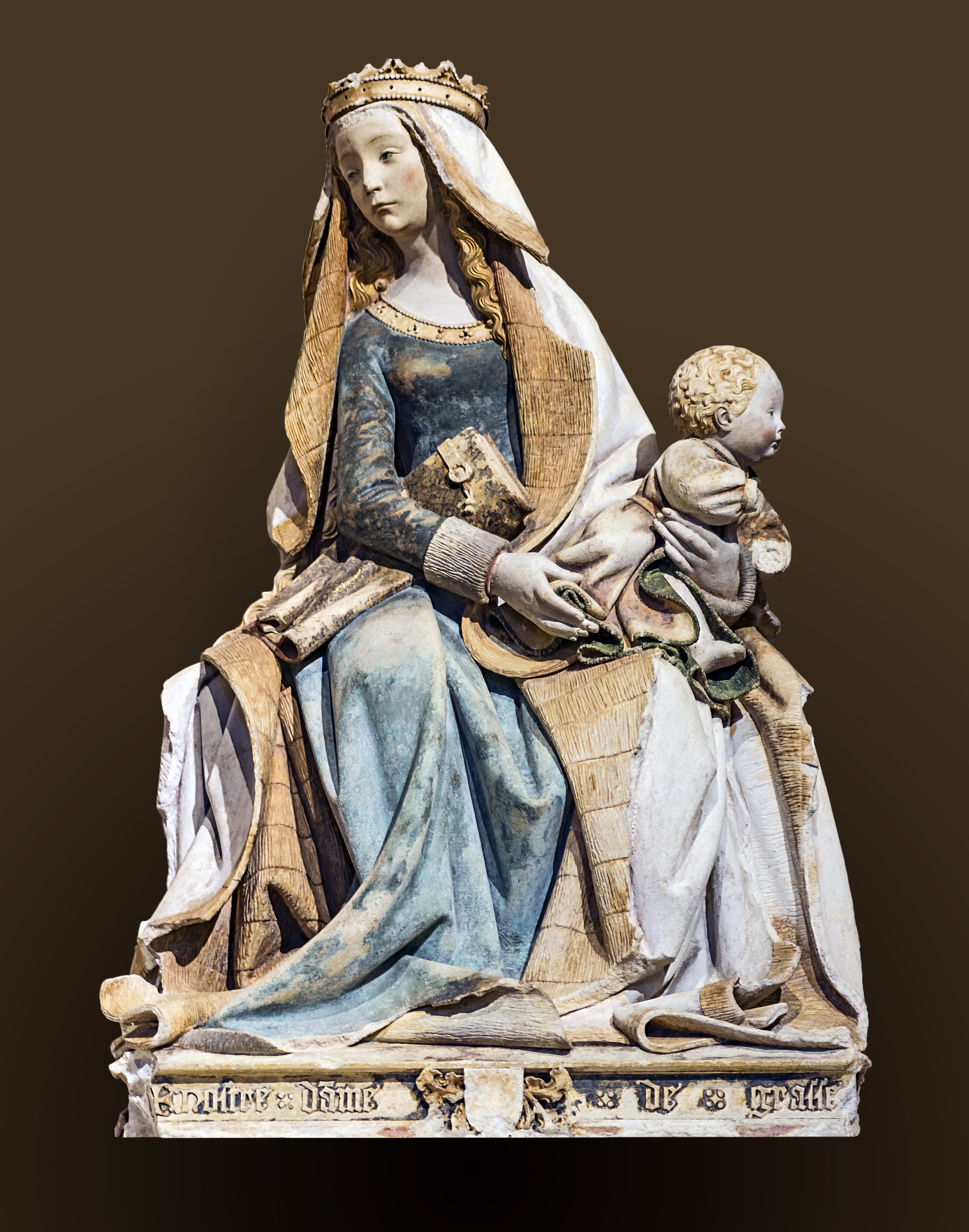
Nostre Dame de Grasse (1460-1500)

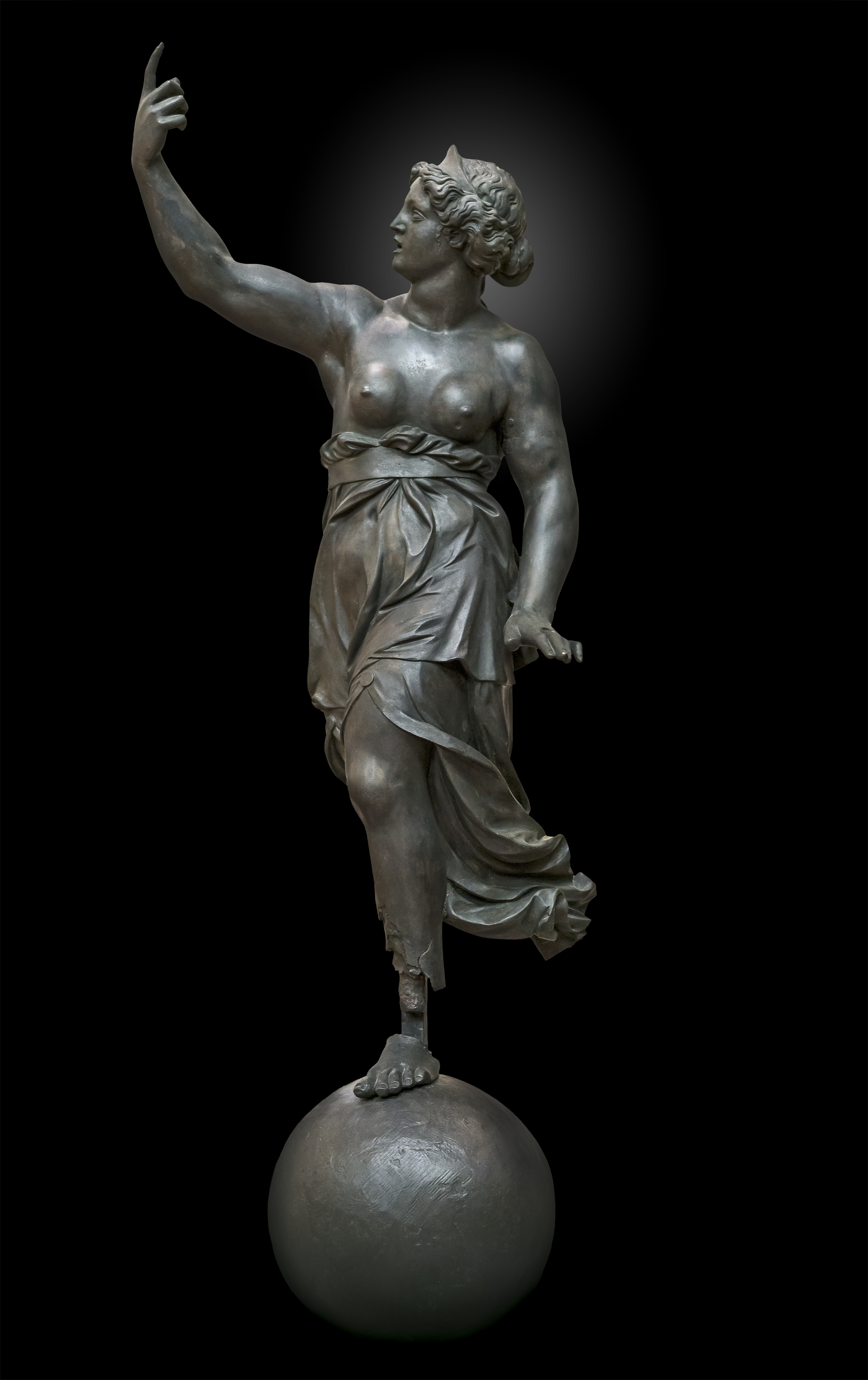
Lady Tholose, 1544-1550

== See also ==
- Listing of the works of Alexandre Falguière
