= Guillaume-Joseph Roques =

French painter

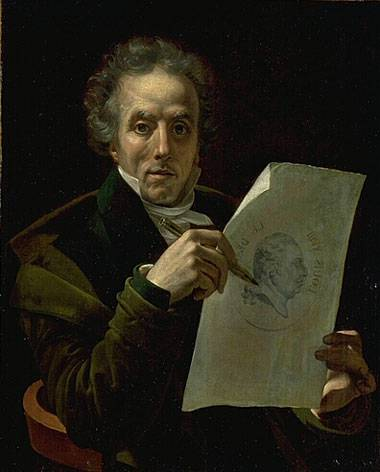
Self-portrait of the artist designing the portrait of Louis XVIII, 1815–1817

Guillaume-Joseph Roques (1757–1847) was a French neoclassical and romantic painter. Roques was a pupil of painter Joseph-Marie Vien in Rome.

He taught at the Royal Academy of Arts in Toulouse where Jean Auguste Dominique Ingres was among his pupils. Ingres entered the Academy of Toulouse in 1791 under Roques. He was a prolific artist and one of the most notable exponents of neoclassicism outside of the centre of the movement in Paris, though later in life he tended towards romanticism.

His most notable paintings include a copy of Jacques-Louis David's The Death of Marat (1793) and a series of works covering the life of the Virgin Mary, painted from 1810 to 1820 for the choir of the church of Notre-Dame de la Daurade in Toulouse.

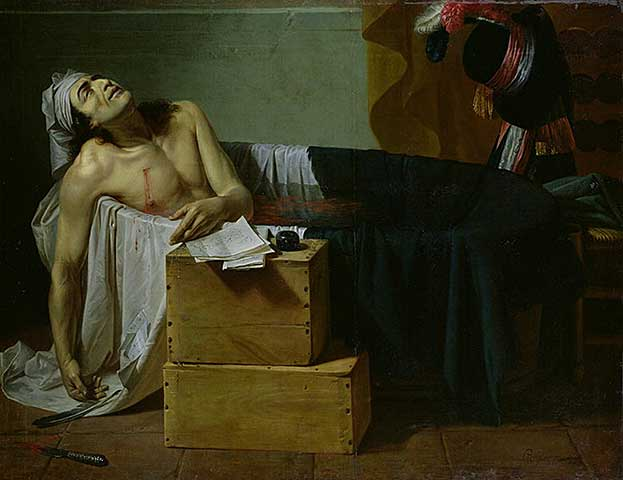
The Death of Marat by Guillaume-Joseph Roques, 1793, with a knife lying on the floor at lower left

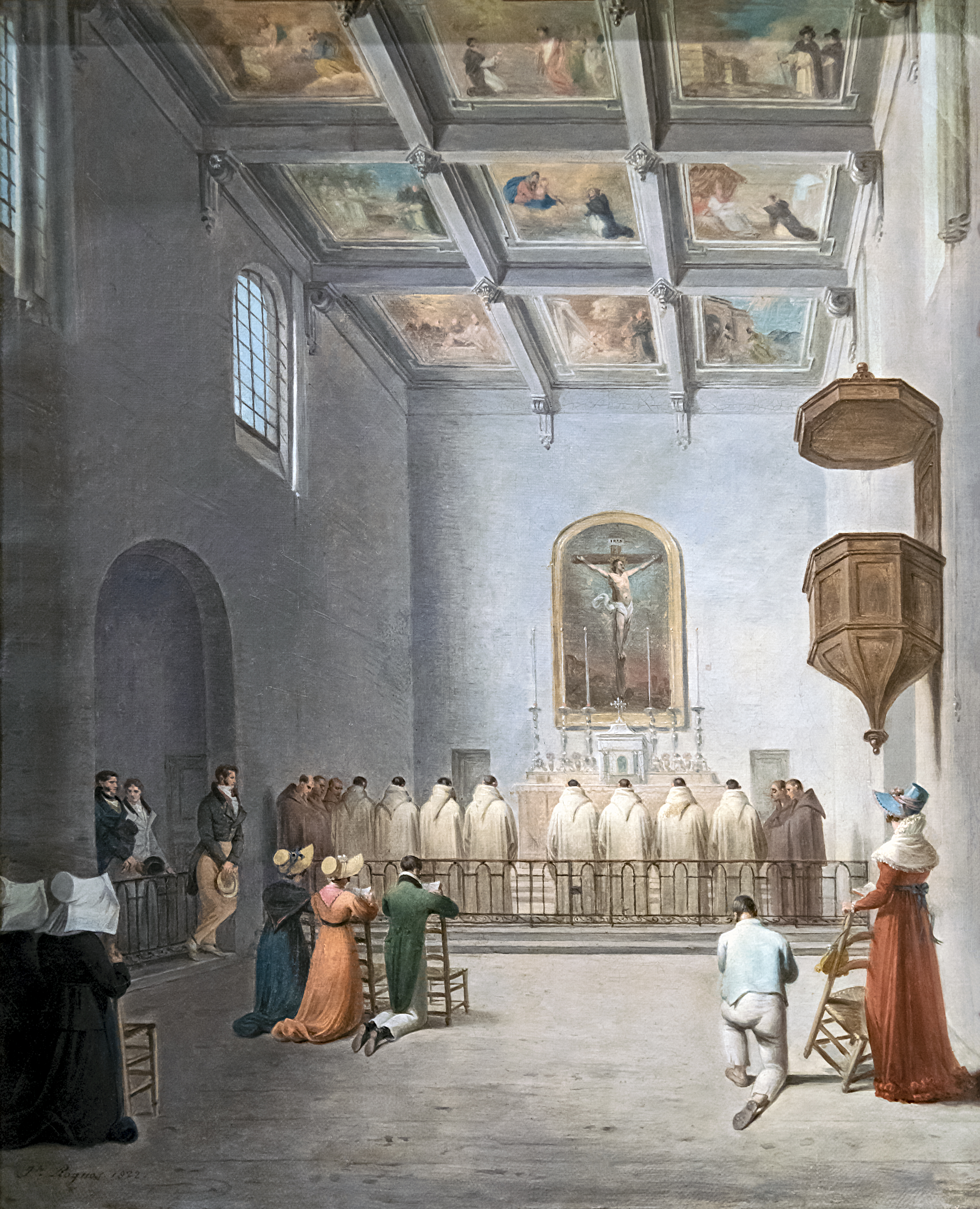
L'intérieur de la chapelle de l'Inquisition, 1822 Musée du Vieux Toulouse

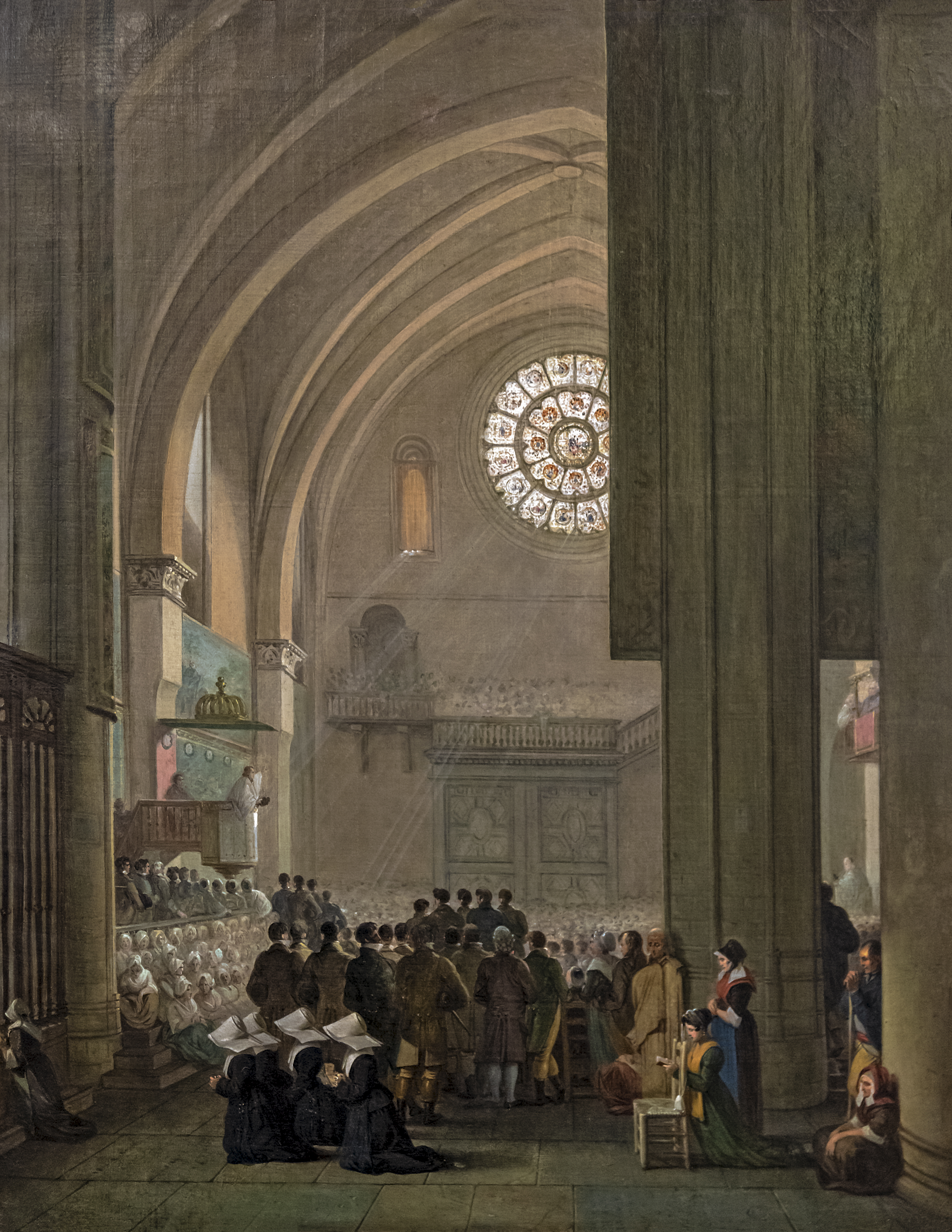
La mission de 1819 dans la cathédrale Saint-Etienne Musée du Vieux Toulouse

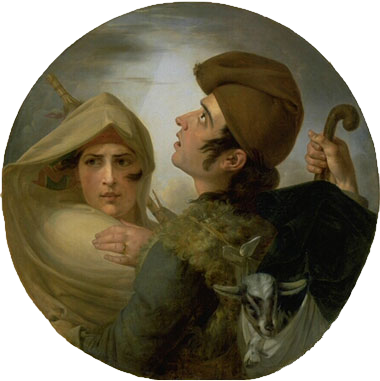
Bergers de la vallée de Campan, 1835.

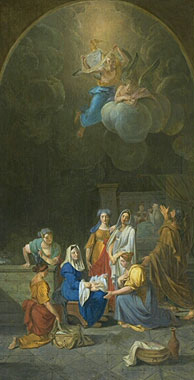
Nativite de la Vierge, 1810. This painting is the preparatory sketch for the painting in Notre-Dame de la Daurade. Angels at the top partially restored.
