= Maison Seilhan =

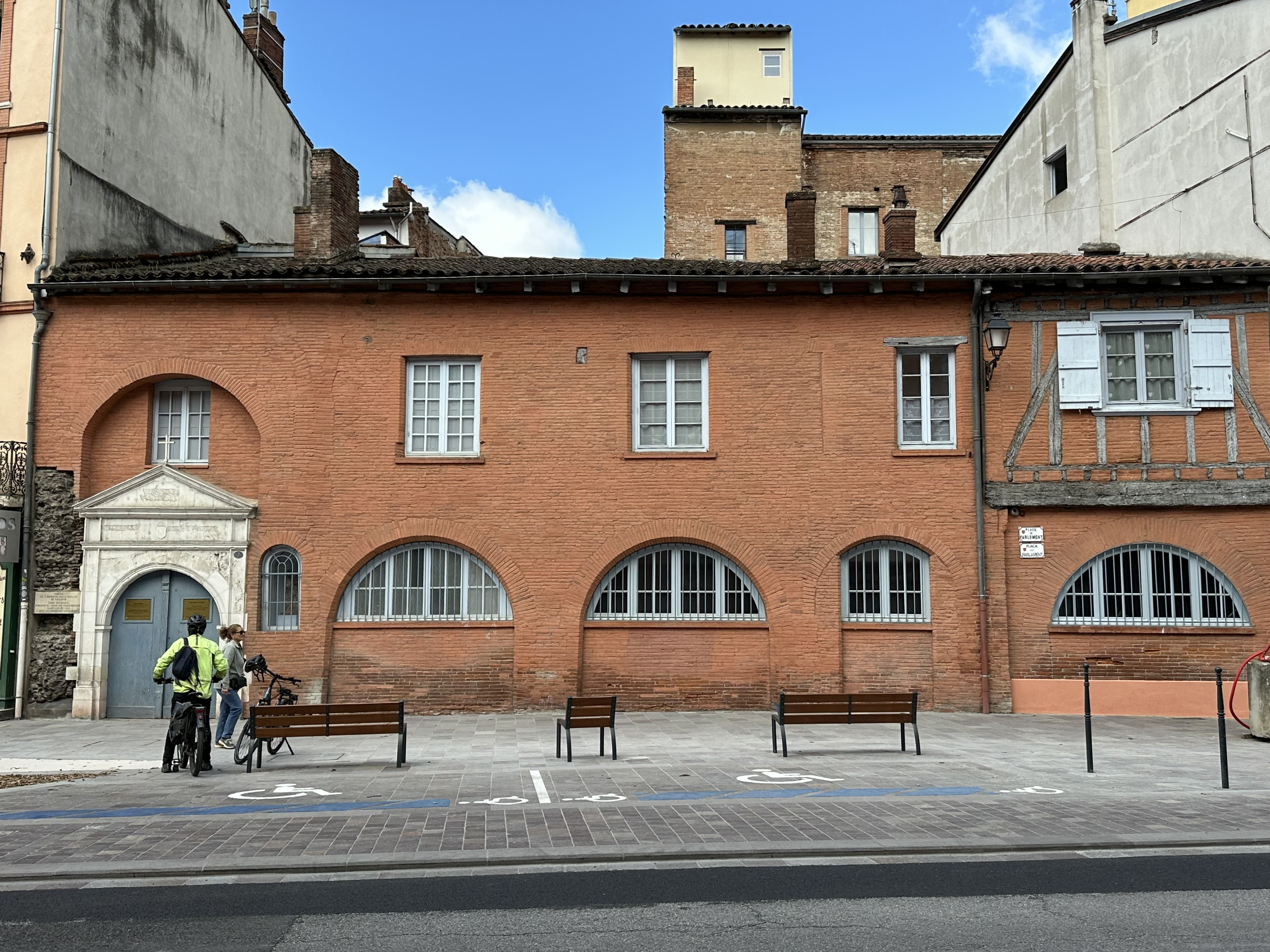
- Facade of the Maison Seilhan, Place du Parlement
- Interactive map of the Maison Seilhan area

General information
- Location: Toulouse, France
- Coordinates: 43.59402°N 1.443847°E

The Maison Seilhan (a French name meaning Seilhan House, occasionally used as such in English; Occitan: Causse de Seilhan), is a historic residence in Toulouse, France, considered the place where the Order of Preachers (Dominican Order) was founded. It was given to Dominic de Guzmán (also known as Saint Dominic) during the division of the inheritance of Bernard Seilhan, a local magistrate of the Count of Toulouse, on 25 April 1215. The deed is preserved in the French National Archives. The Maison Seilhan features various artistic works depicting the saints of the Dominican Order and memorabilia related to Henri-Dominique Lacordaire (1802–1861), the restorer of the Order in France.

The Maison Seilhan, which includes Saint Dominic's room, can be visited on certain days of the week, but access to the chapel with its coffered ceiling (Bruno de Solages Amphitheatre) is not guaranteed, as classes from the Catholic Institute of Toulouse may be held there.

== History ==
In 1215, the Castilian preacher Dominic de Guzmán settled with several companions in the family home of one of them, Pierre Seilhan. On 25 April 1215, Dominic officially received ownership of the house, as head of the community—his share of the inheritance assigned to Pierre Seilhan, who had taken religious vows.

While settling, in July 1216, at the Saint-Romain Priory (rue Saint-Rome), and later gradually, from 1234 onward, at the Jacobins convent, the friars of the Order of Preachers retained possession and use of the house until the end of the 18th century.

The house was used to lodge friars assigned to serve the Inquisition, which is why it became known as the "House of the Inquisition".

In 1989, the Toulouse Association of Saint Dominic purchased the house on behalf of the Dominican Order. At the same time, the Catholic Institute of Toulouse acquired the remaining buildings, including the former chapel converted in the 17th century. This chapel was transformed into an amphitheatre and became a lecture hall. The chapel of the Sisters of the Society of Mary Reparatrix (the last owners before the Catholic Institute) was then renamed the Bruno de Solages Amphitheatre.

The whole complex—Maison Seilhan and the Bruno de Solages Amphitheatre—is backed onto the remains of the Roman wall of Toulouse.

The white stone portal of the Maison Seilhan was carved and added in the 16th century by the Toulouse master mason Laurent Clary.

Renovation work on the Bruno de Solages Amphitheatre led to the discovery of a painted ceiling dating from between 1648 and 1650, created by a Dominican novice, Balthasar-Thomas Moncornet (1630–1716). The life of the founder, Saint Dominic, is depicted across fifteen panels. Four mural paintings, now lost, once complemented the ceiling scenes.

The Maison Seilhan also preserves a cycle of six paintings from 1754. Created by Verotius for the Dominican convent in Trier (Germany), the works were incorporated into the Maison Seilhan on 1 February 1861.

Within the Maison Seilhan, a room traditionally believed to be where the first community slept and prayed has been preserved as an oratory. In addition to its historic painted ceiling, the room features a contemporary stained glass window by the Dominican Kim En Jong and an altar sculpted in 2014 by Dominique Kaeppelin.

== Notable locations ==
=== Dominic’s room ===
According to tradition, this room is where Saint Dominic and his first companions lived. Remnants of the wall from the city's former Gallo-Roman enclosure can still be seen here.

Saint Dominic’s room

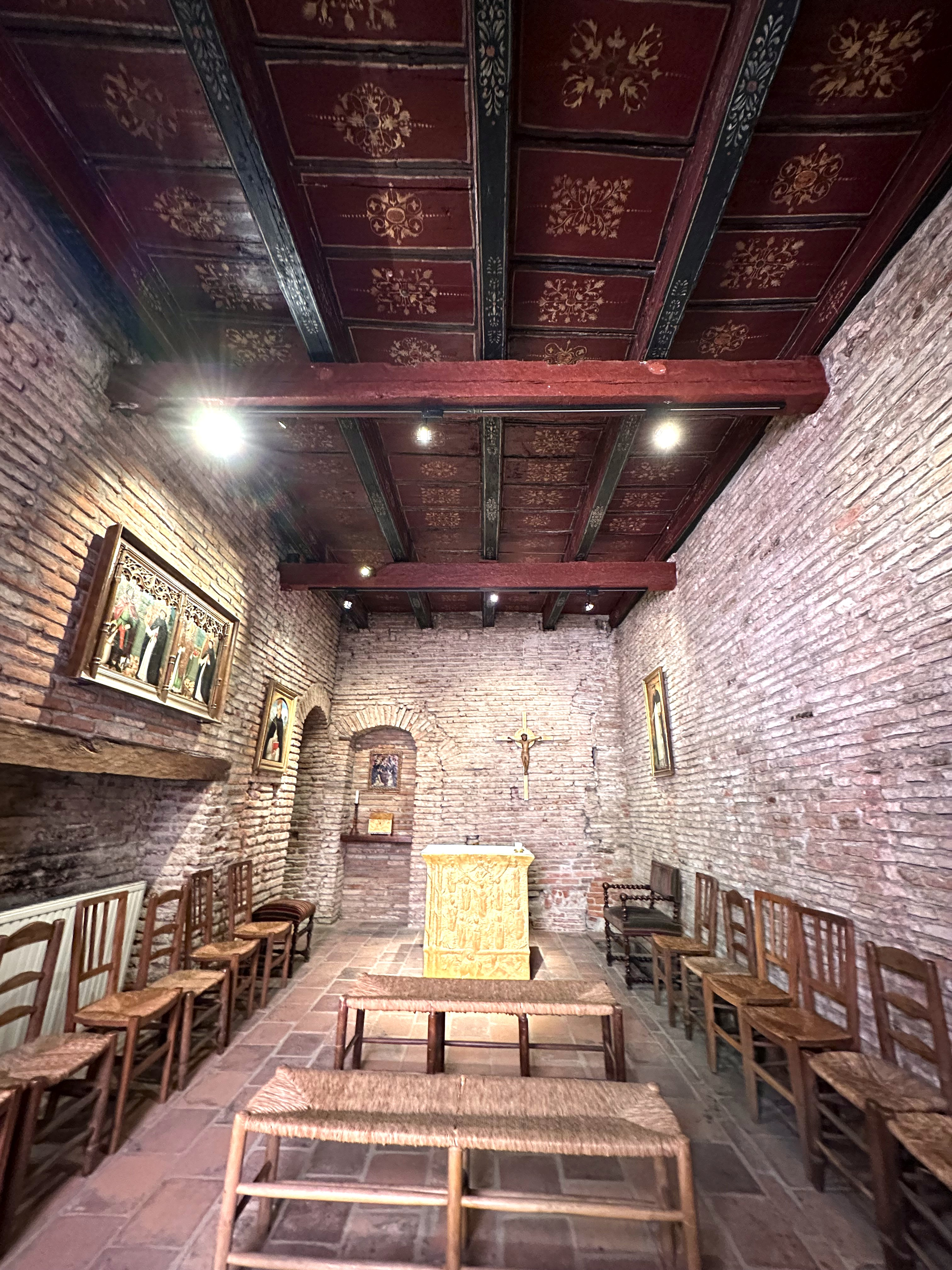

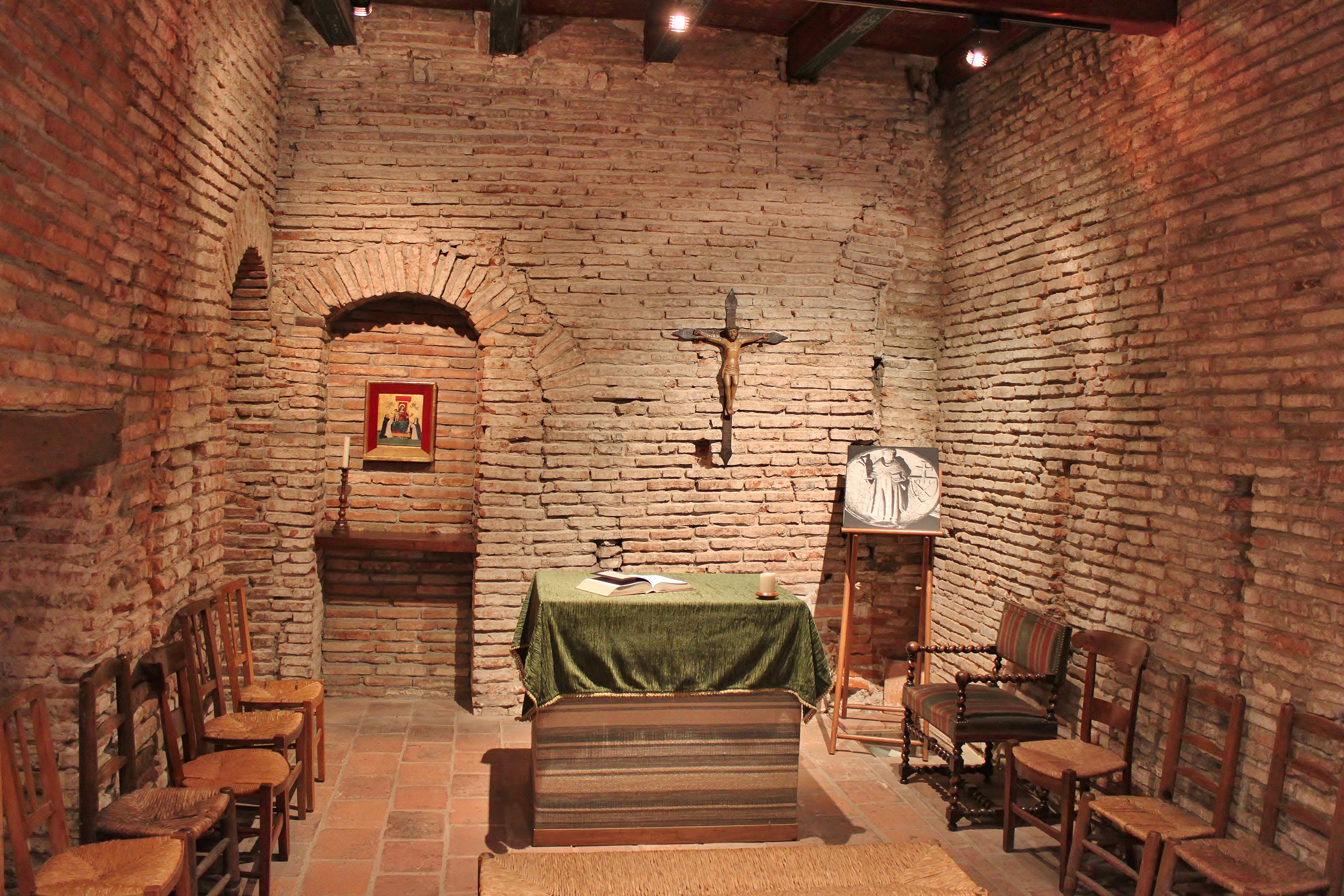

=== Series of paintings ===
Six paintings located on the upper floor depict the life of Saint Dominic.

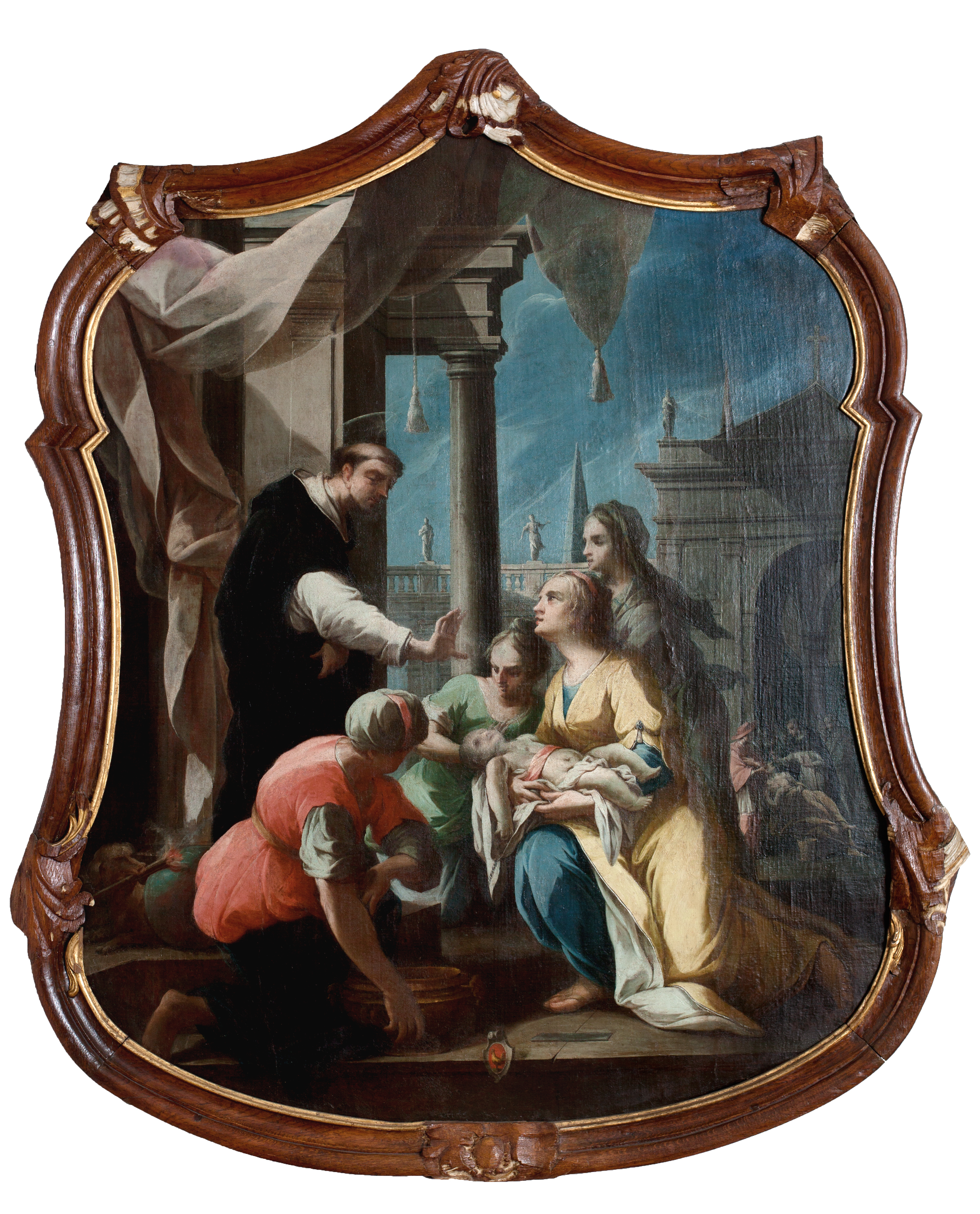
Resurrection of the Widow’s Son at Saint-Sixte

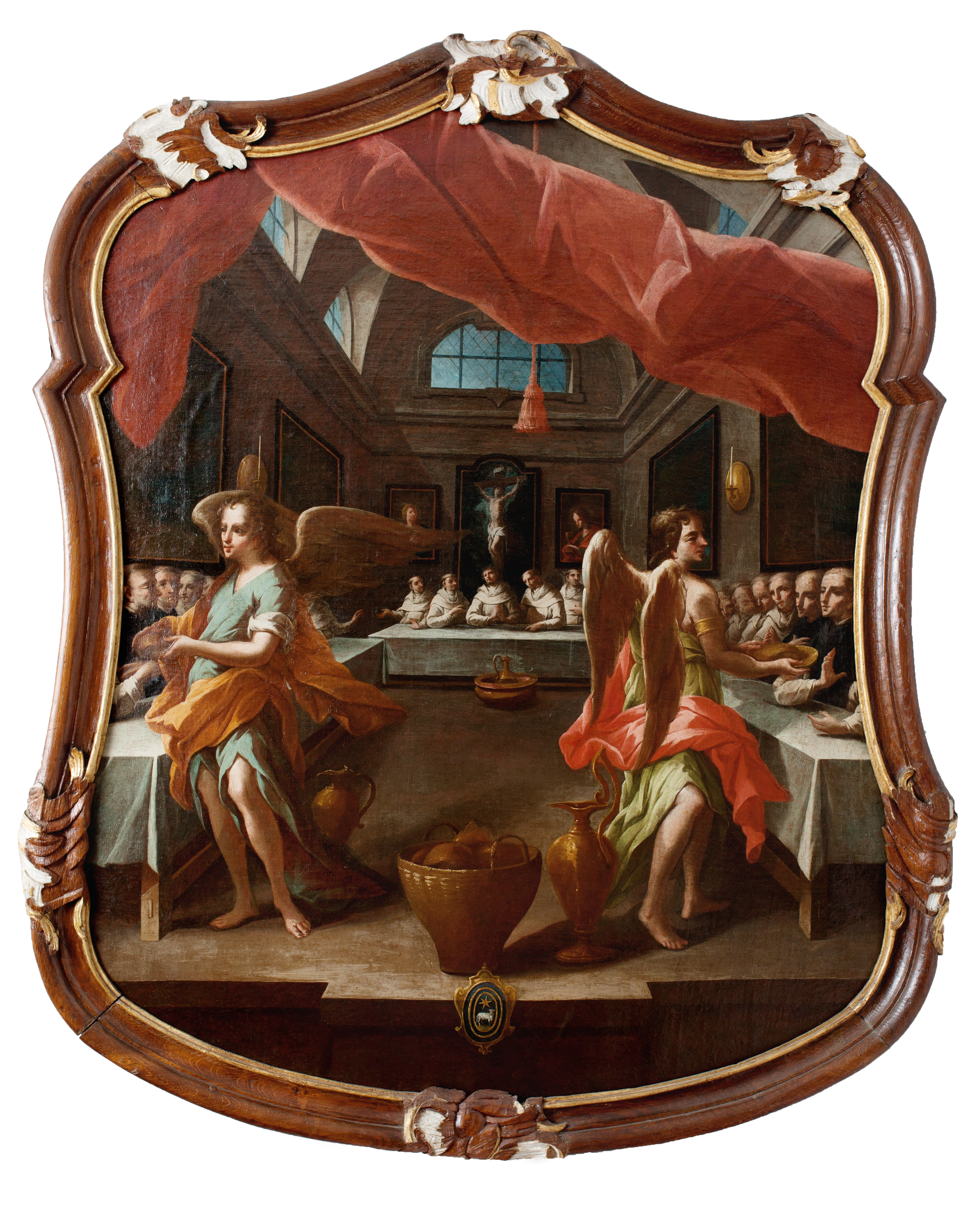
Miracle of the Meal at Saint-Sixte

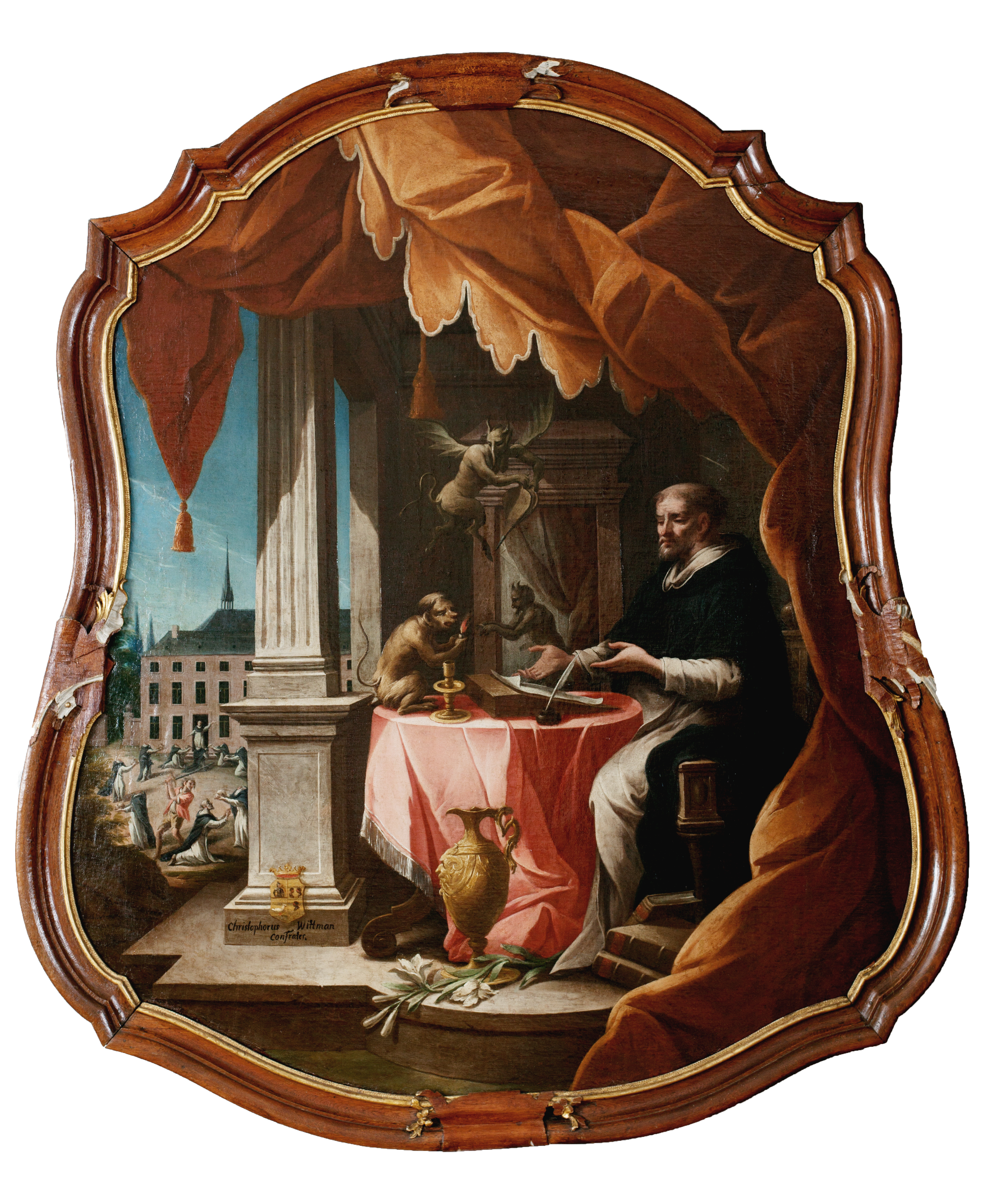
Saint Dominic Overcomes the Demon at Saint-Sixte

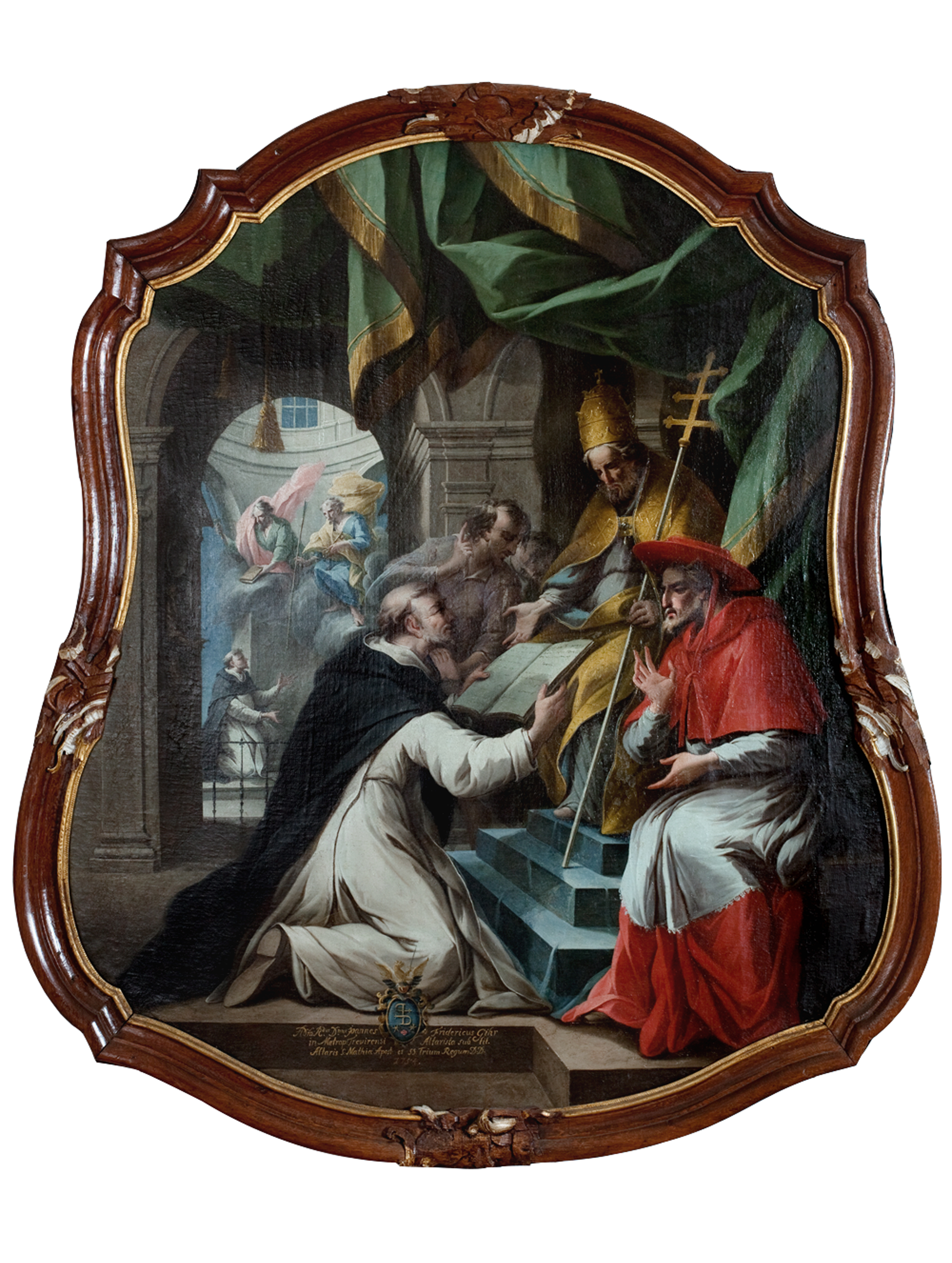
Approval of the Constitutions by Honorius III

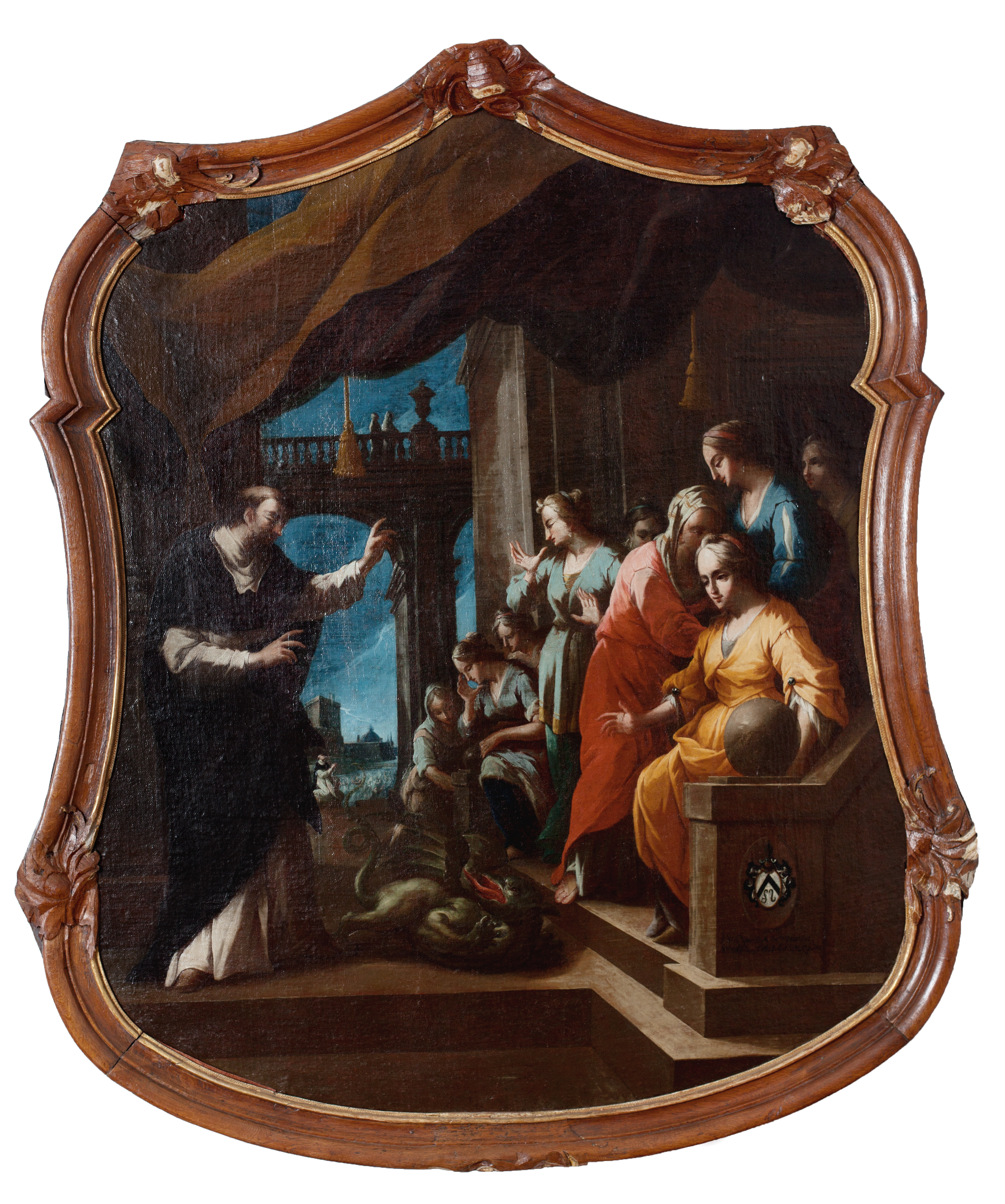
Conversion of Cathar Women who Founded Notre Dame de Prouilhe

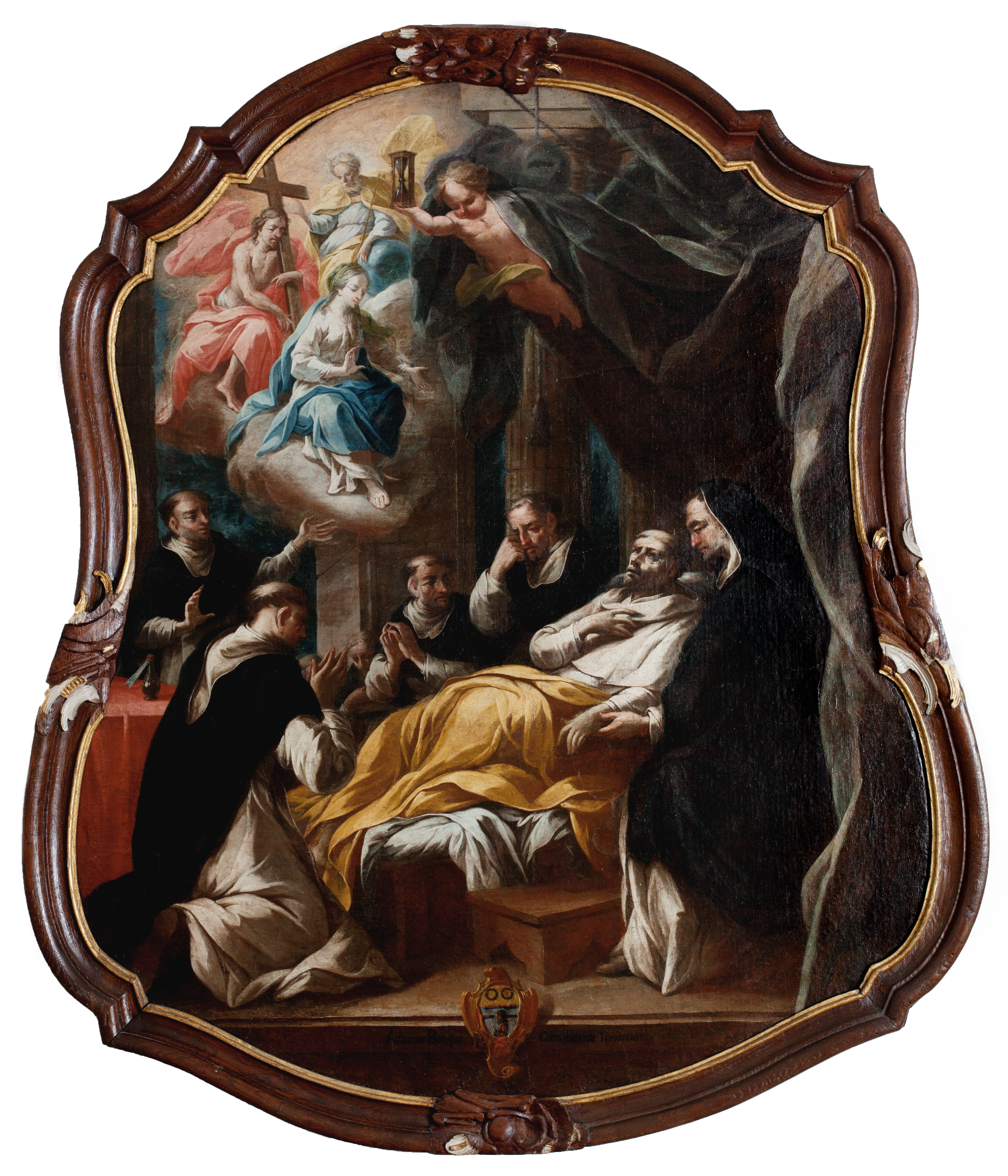
Death of Saint Dominic in Bologna

=== The chapel (Bruno de Solages Amphitheatre) ===
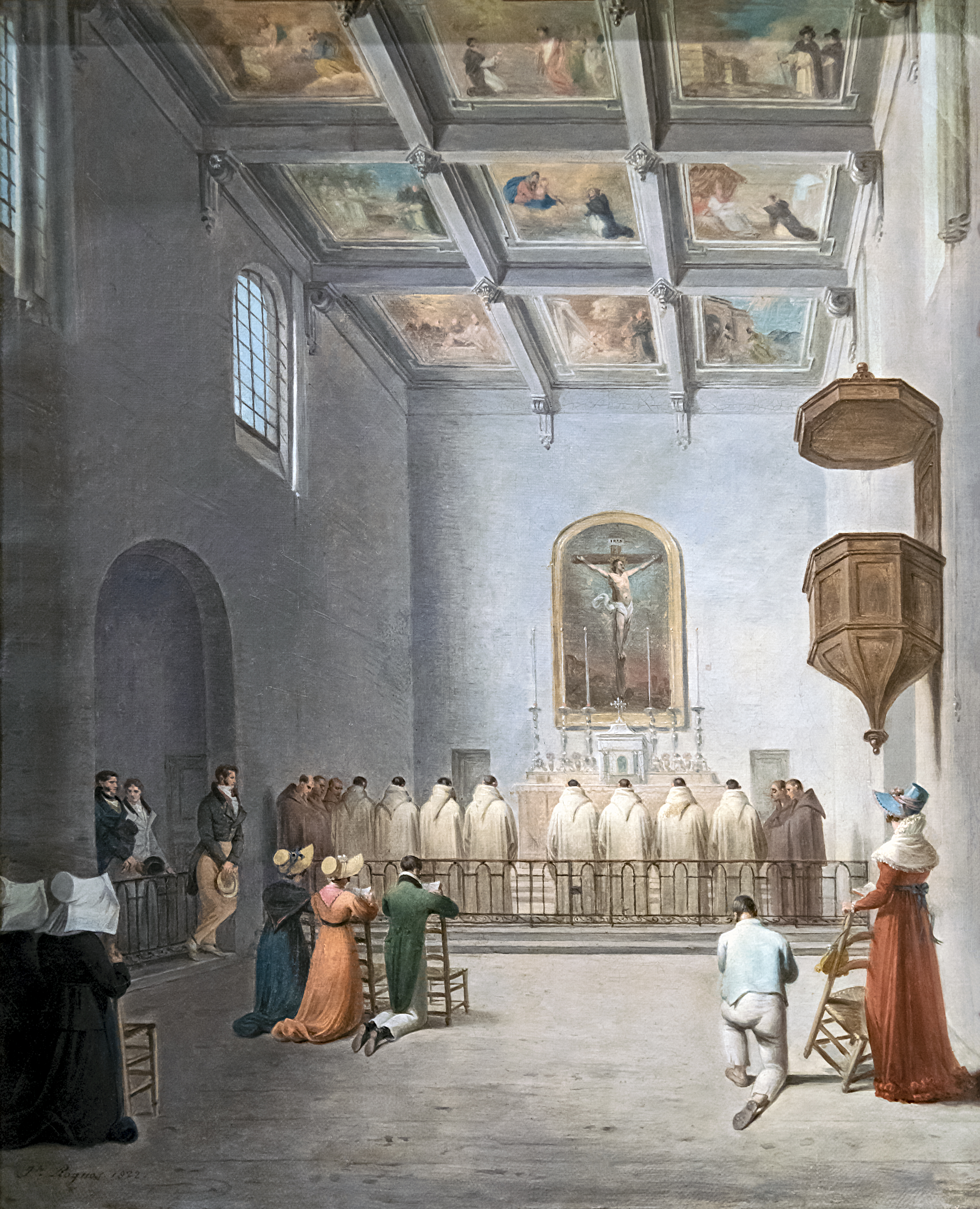
Interior of the Chapel of the Inquisition – Joseph Roques

This room adjacent to the Maison Seilhan was originally the chapel of the site and is now an amphitheatre of the Catholic University. Its ceiling consists of a series of five rows of three paintings from the 17th century, illustrating the life of Saint Dominic like a large comic strip. The series was painted by the Dominican brother Balthasar-Thomas Moncornet.

One of the paintings shows Mary offering the Rosary to Saint Dominic. However, this is symbolic, as the Rosary did not yet exist at the time of the saint. The Dominicans have always had a strong devotion to Mary.

Another panel shows Saints Peter and Paul offering Dominic the pilgrim’s staff and the Book of Scripture to reconcile people with God.

In another panel, a dog holds a flaming torch in its mouth near a globe, referencing the Gospel saying that Jesus came to bring fire upon the earth. The dog, one of the symbols of the Order, was kept due to the Latin pun: "the Lord’s dogs" – Domini canes – a play on the word "Dominican".

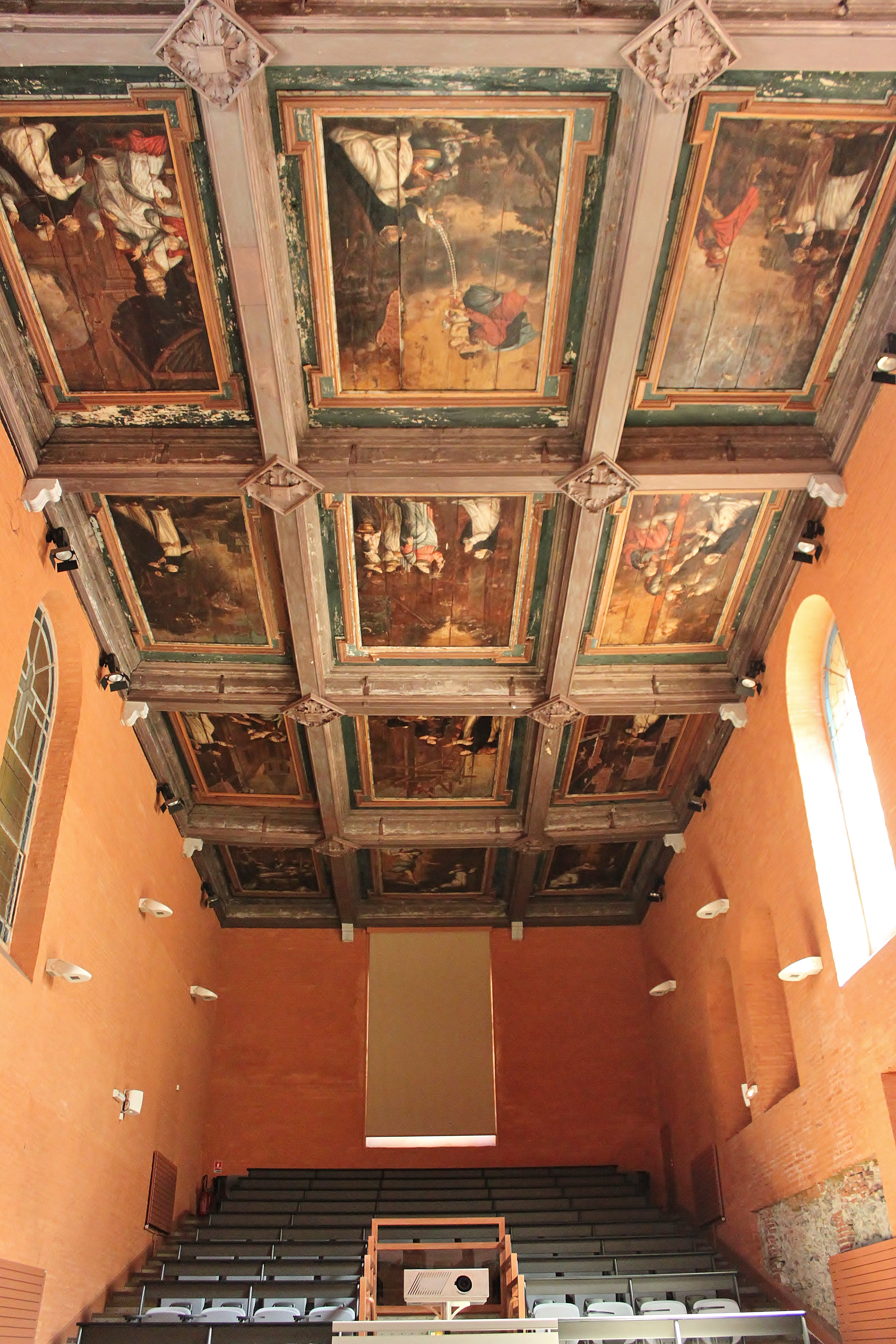
The chapel has become an amphitheatre of the ICT.

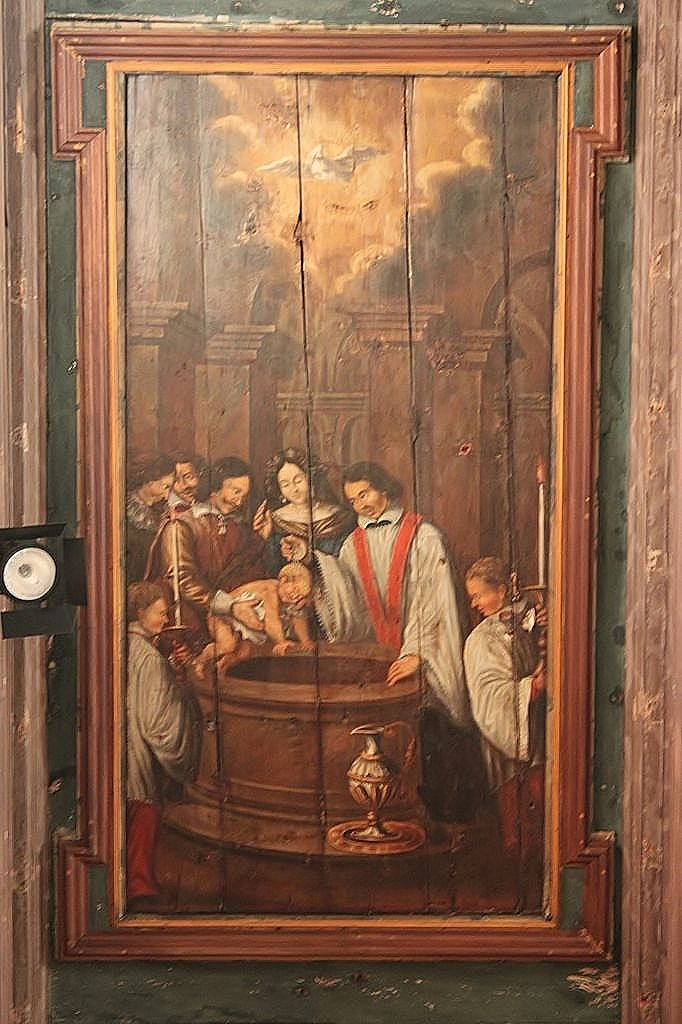
Panel 1 – The baptism of Dominic.

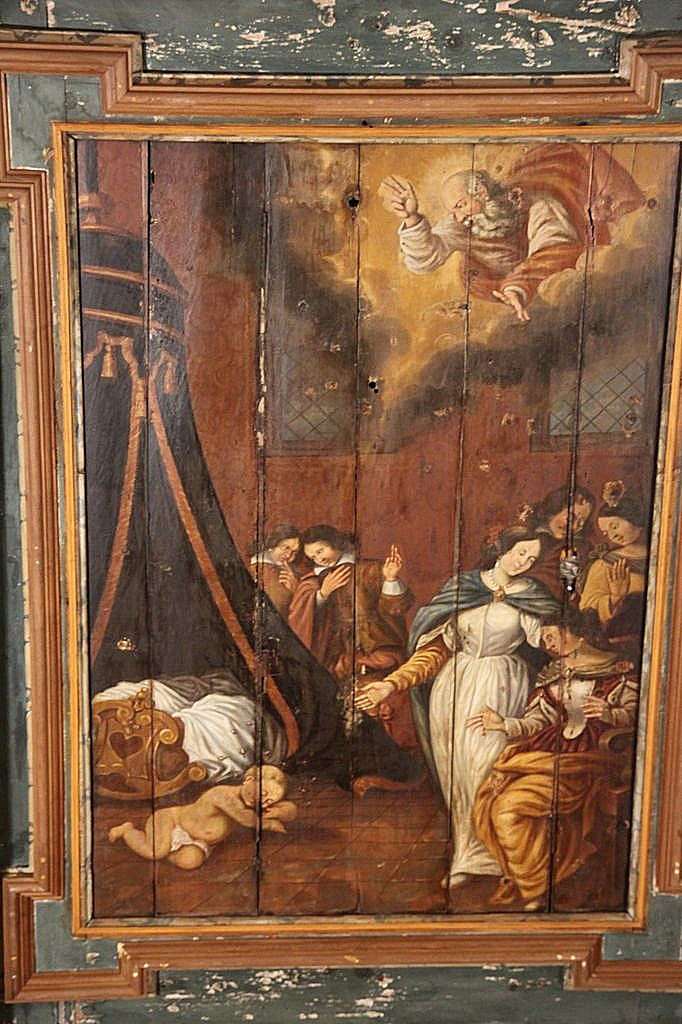
Panel 2 – A sign of vocation.

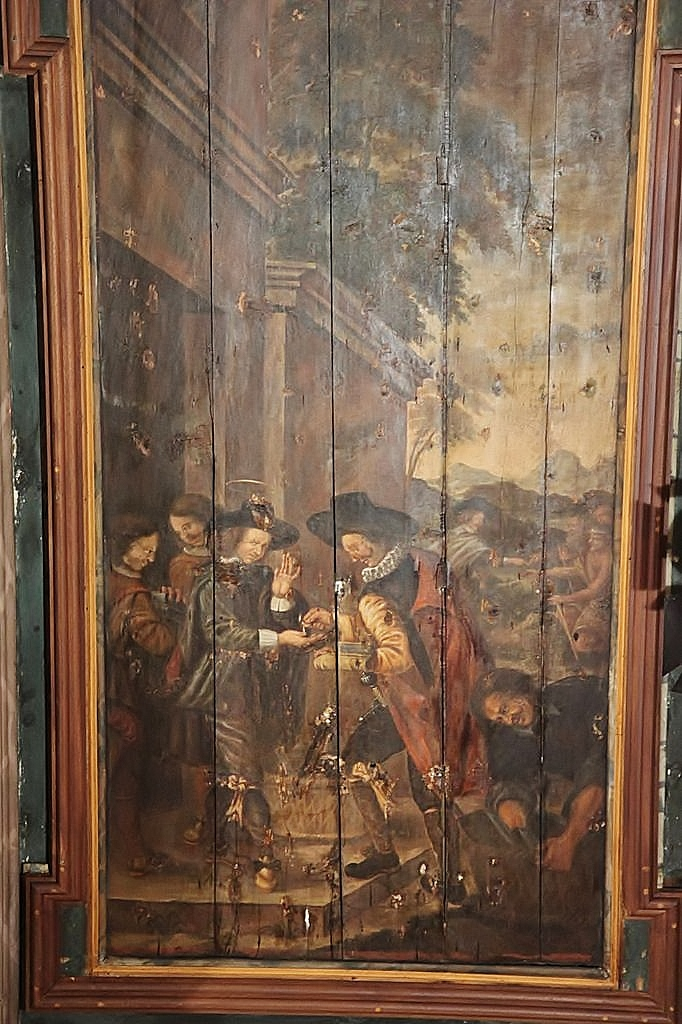
Panel 3 – Dominic’s mercy.

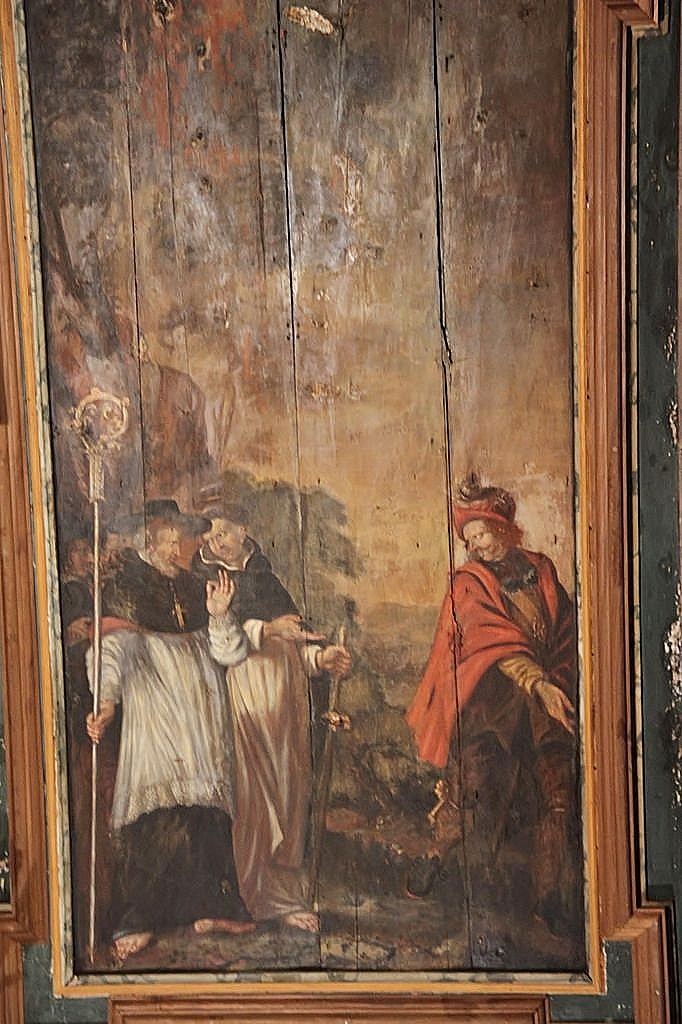
Panel 4 – The return to the Gospel.

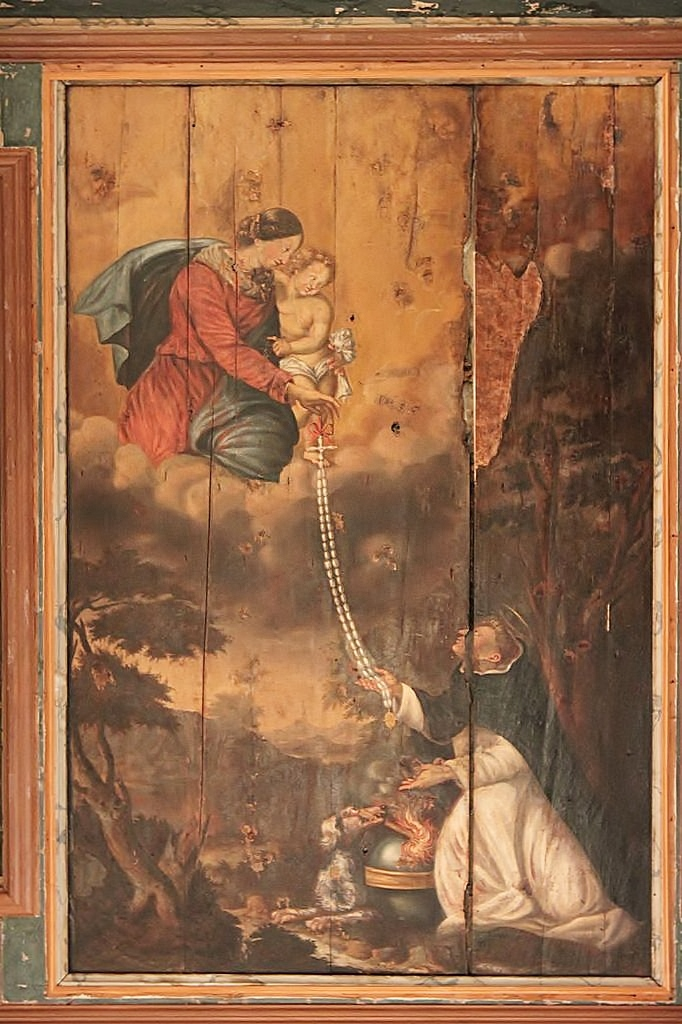
Panel 5 – The prayer of the Rosary.

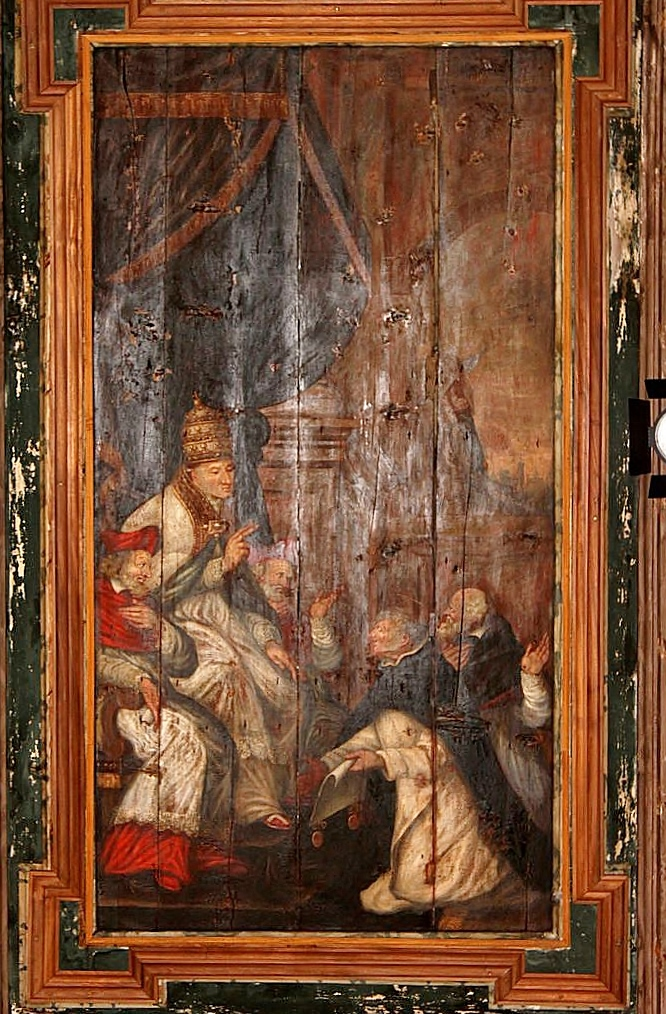
Panel 6 – Institution of the Order of Preachers.

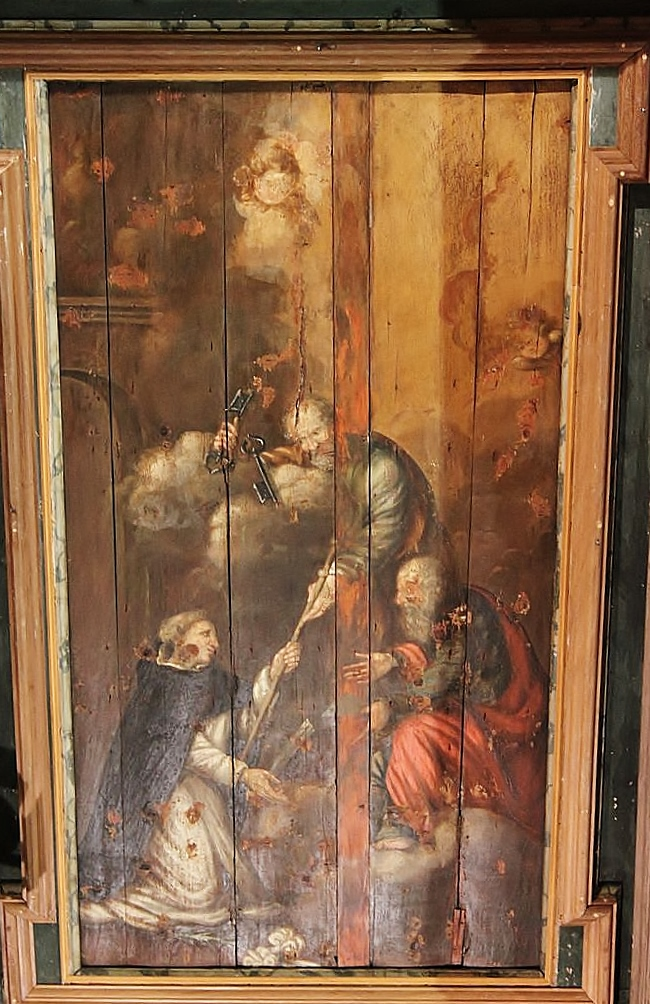
Panel 7 – The apostolic vocation.

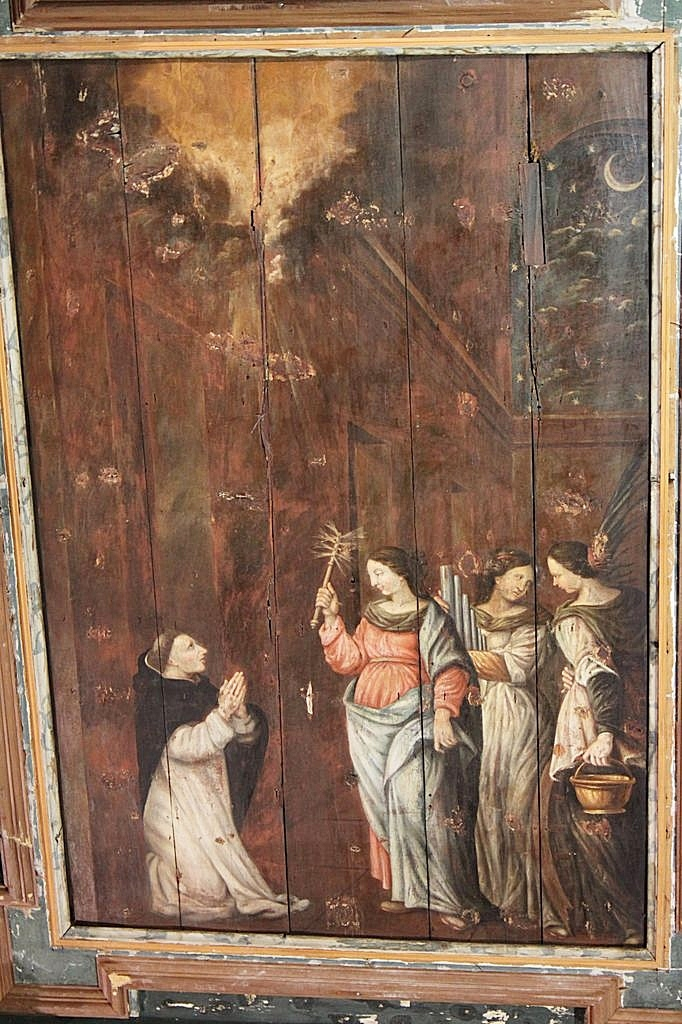
Panel 8 – Protection by the Virgin Mary, Catherine, and Cecilia.

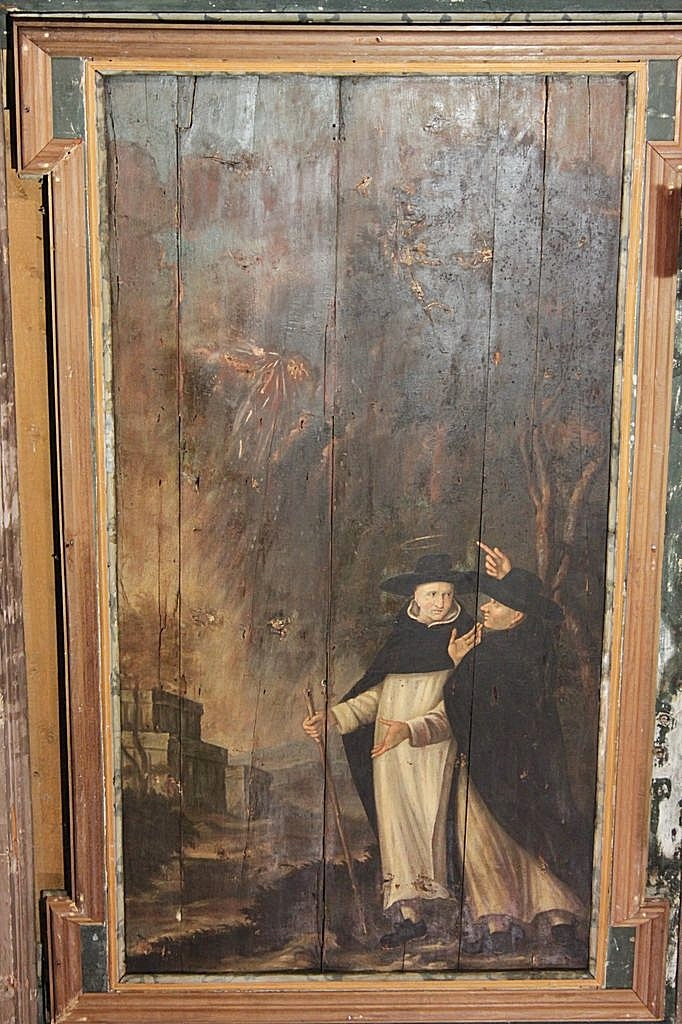
Panel 9 – A miraculous intervention.

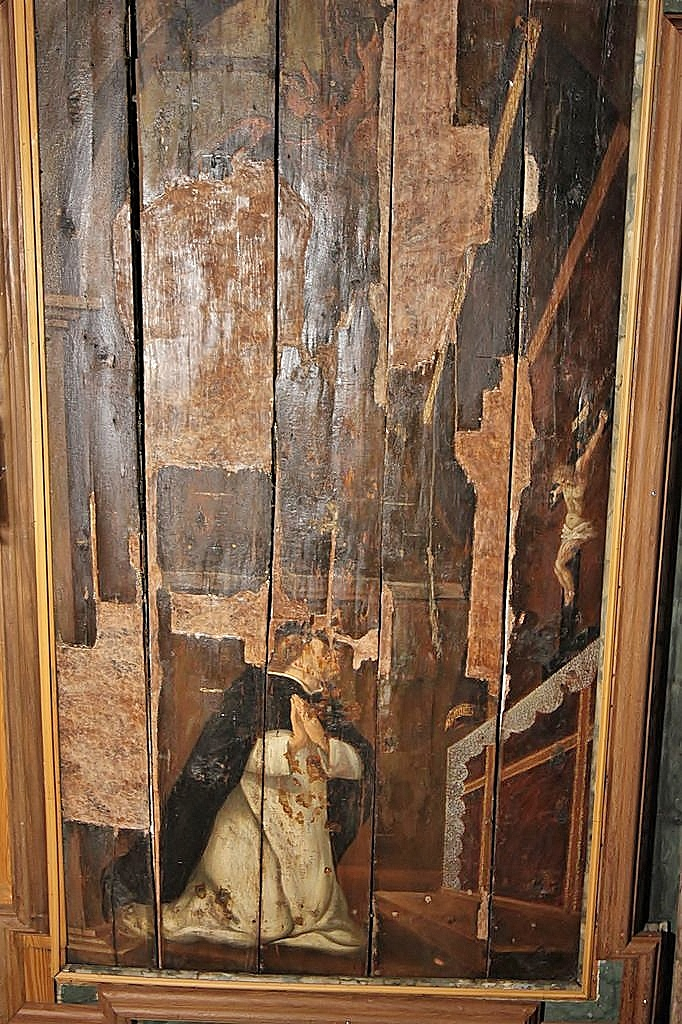
Panel 10 – Dominic’s prayer.

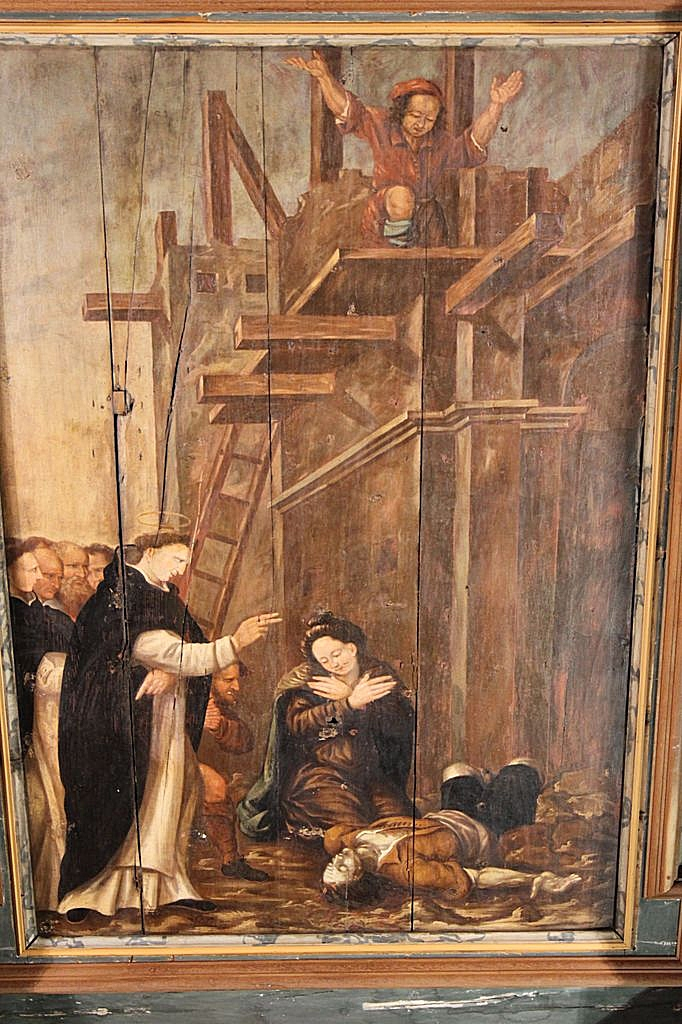
Panel 11 – A healing.

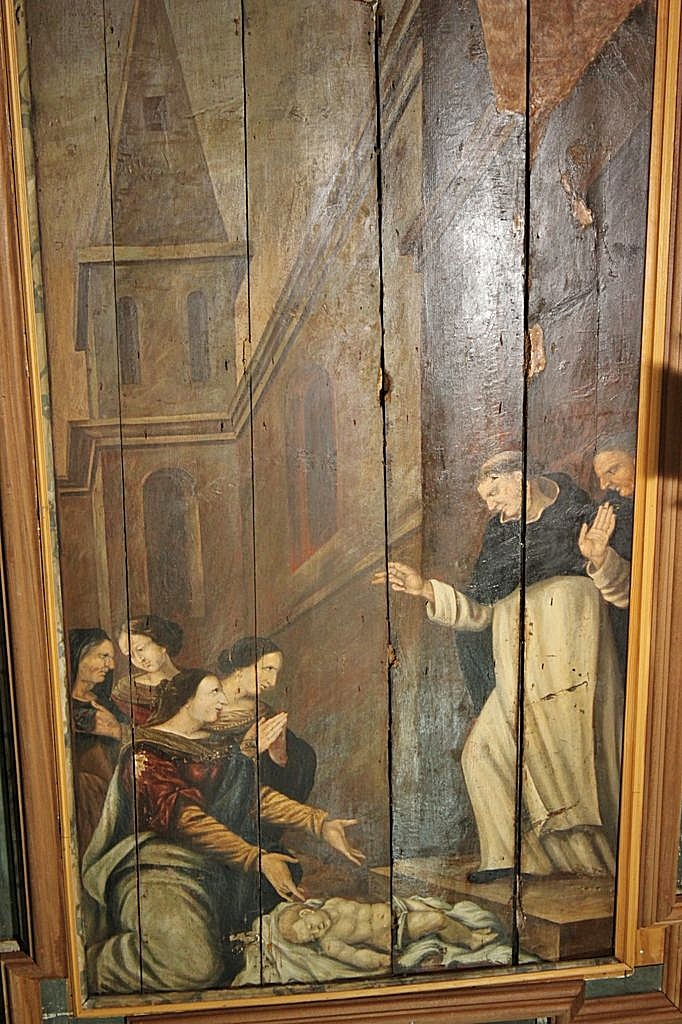
Panel 12 – A healing in Rome.

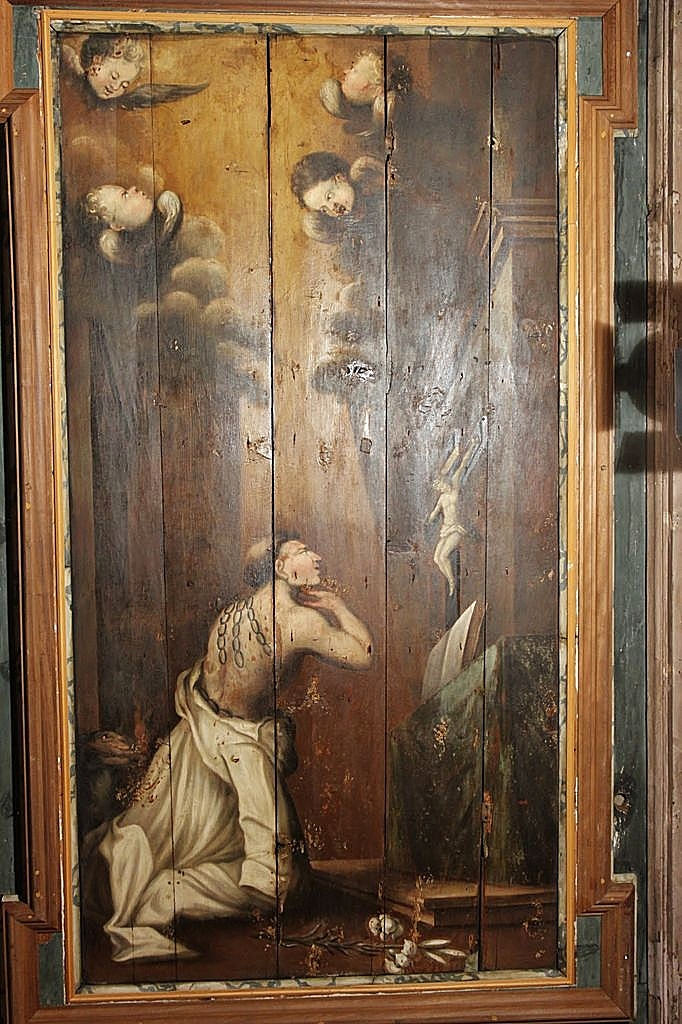
Panel 13 – Dominic’s purity.

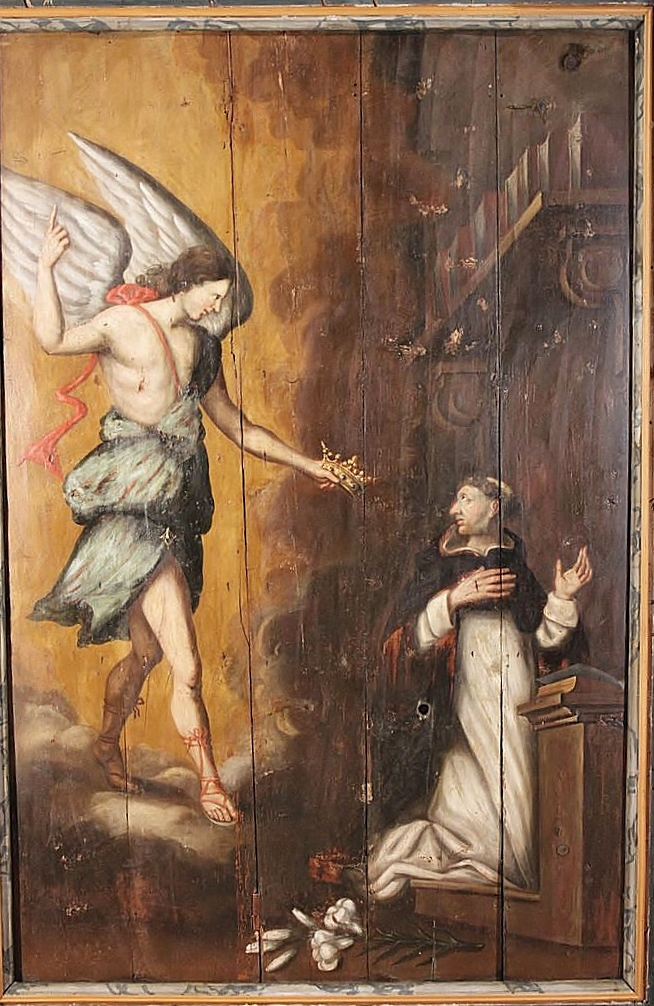
Panel 14 – The approaching end.

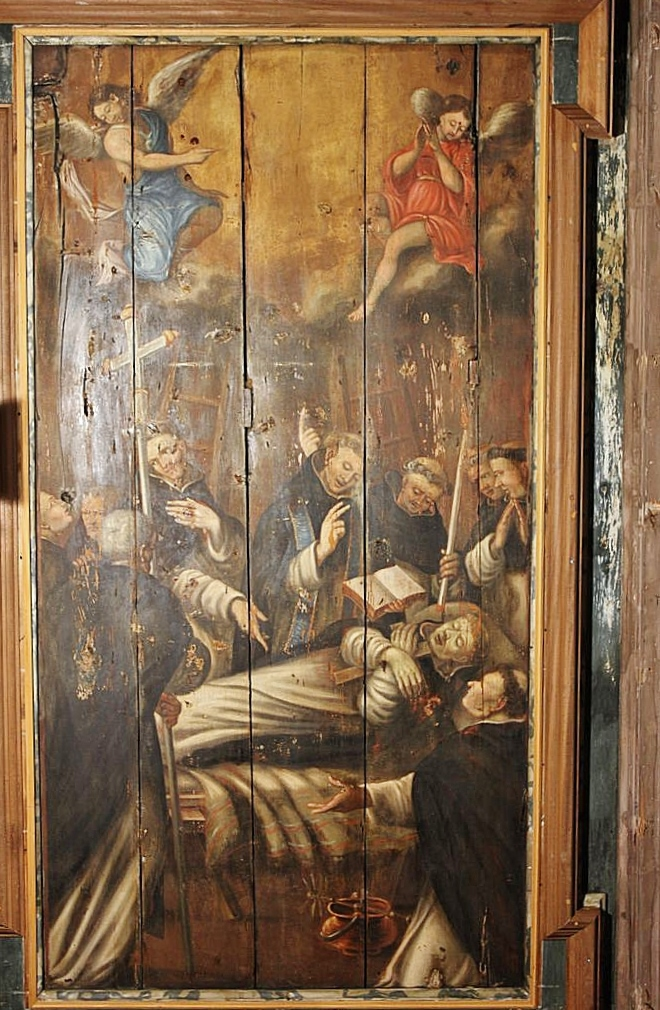
Panel 15 – The death of Dominic.
