= Kim En Jong =

Korean Dominican priest and painter

Father Kim En Jong
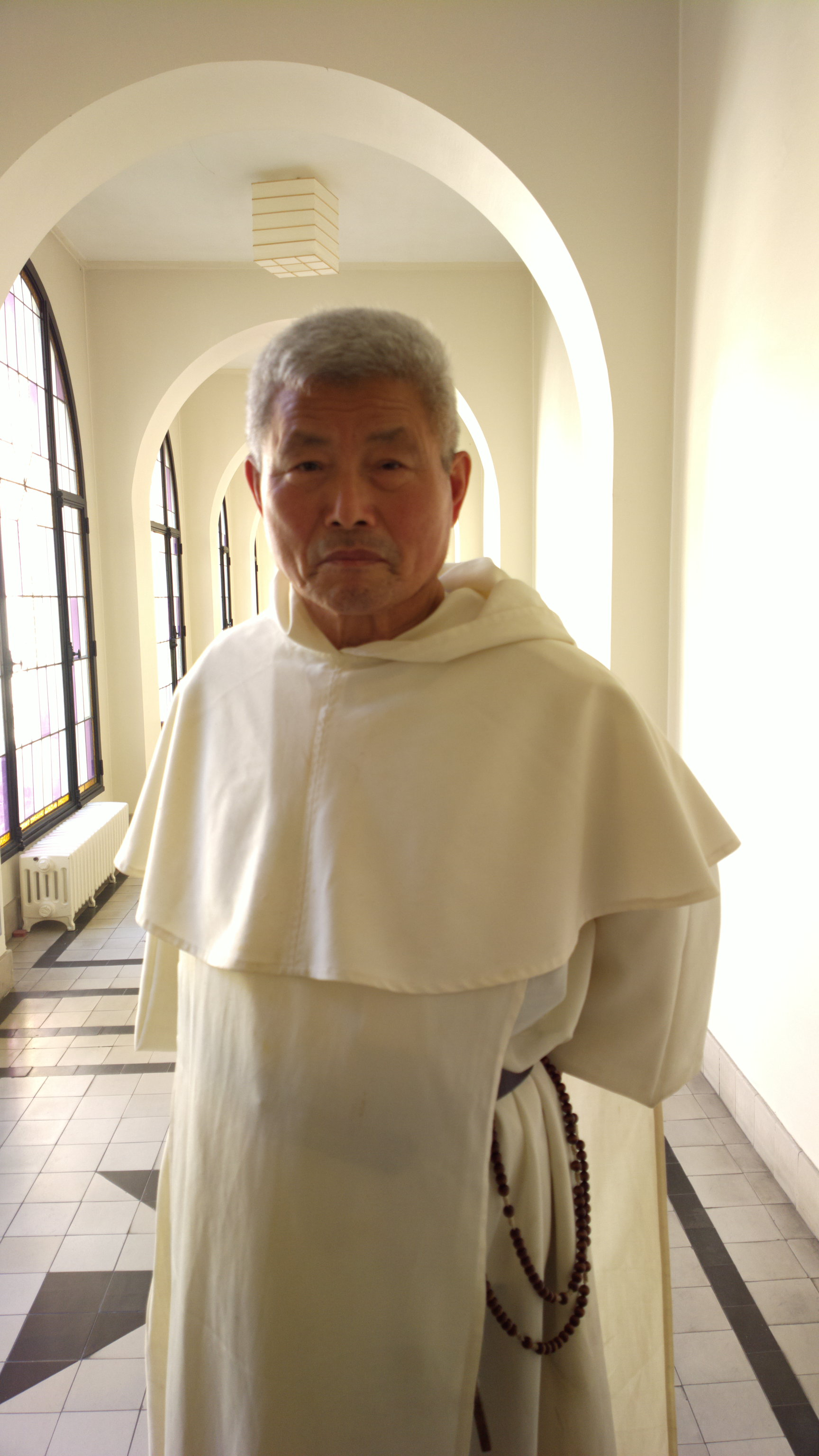
- Father Kim En Jong
- Born: 10 September 1940 (age 85); Buyeo County, Korea, Empire of Japan
- Education: Seoul Institute of the Arts (1959)
- Occupations: Dominican priest, painter
- Religion: Roman Catholic Christianity
- Church: Roman Catholic Church
- Ordained: 1974

Korean name
- Hangul: 김인중
- RR: Gim Injung
- MR: Kim Injung

Father Kim En Jong (Korean: 김인중; September 10, 1940) is a Korean Dominican priest and painter. He is currently living at Couvent de l'Annonciation de Paris.

== Biography ==
Born in 1940 into a taoist family, he has seven brothers. The family moved to Daejeon when he was still a baby, and there he discovered colours in the prints of the Japanese who had just left Korea. From 1947 to 1959 he studied in this city until high school and began to practice calligraphy. At seventeen, he attended free drawing lessons in high school and in 1959 was admitted to the Seoul Institute of the Arts.

His studies were interrupted by military service, in which, in 1963, he became an infantry lieutenant. Coming back, he resumed painting subjects such as birds and flowers. Ended military service in 1965, he became an assistant in drawing courses at the catholic minor seminary in Seoul where he learned about Catholicism and was baptized in 1967. He arrived in Europe in 1969. He studied philosophy in Switzerland, entered the Dominican Order as a novice at the Dominican convent of Freiburg, encouraged by fathers Pfister et Geiger.

He was ordained a priest in 1974, and in 1975 he was assigned to the Convent of the Annunciation in Paris, where he lives and works.

== Style ==
In his works, there is an impression of "liquidity" or "fluidity" of the pigments used. Thanks to sweet, pure and clear colours, Kim En Joong recreates a magical show by playing both on the liveliness of tones and on subtle contrasts. The mystical research of this artist is mainly reflected in his desire to penetrate the essence of things and to make visible what is not a priori. As a painter of light, he often succeeds in realizing this purpose.

== Honours and awards ==
Ordre des Arts et des Lettres, 2020

== Gallery ==
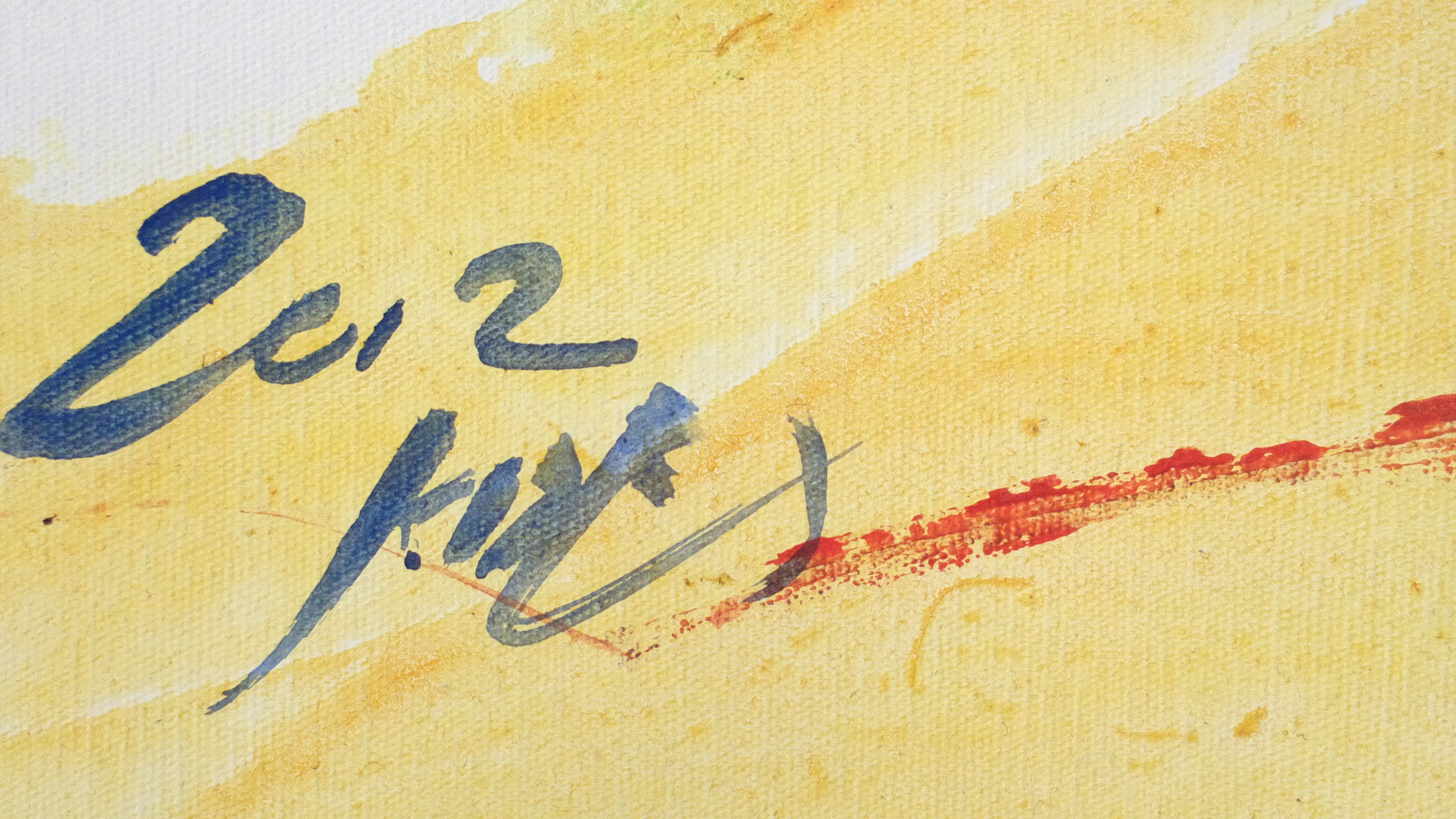
Father Kim's signature

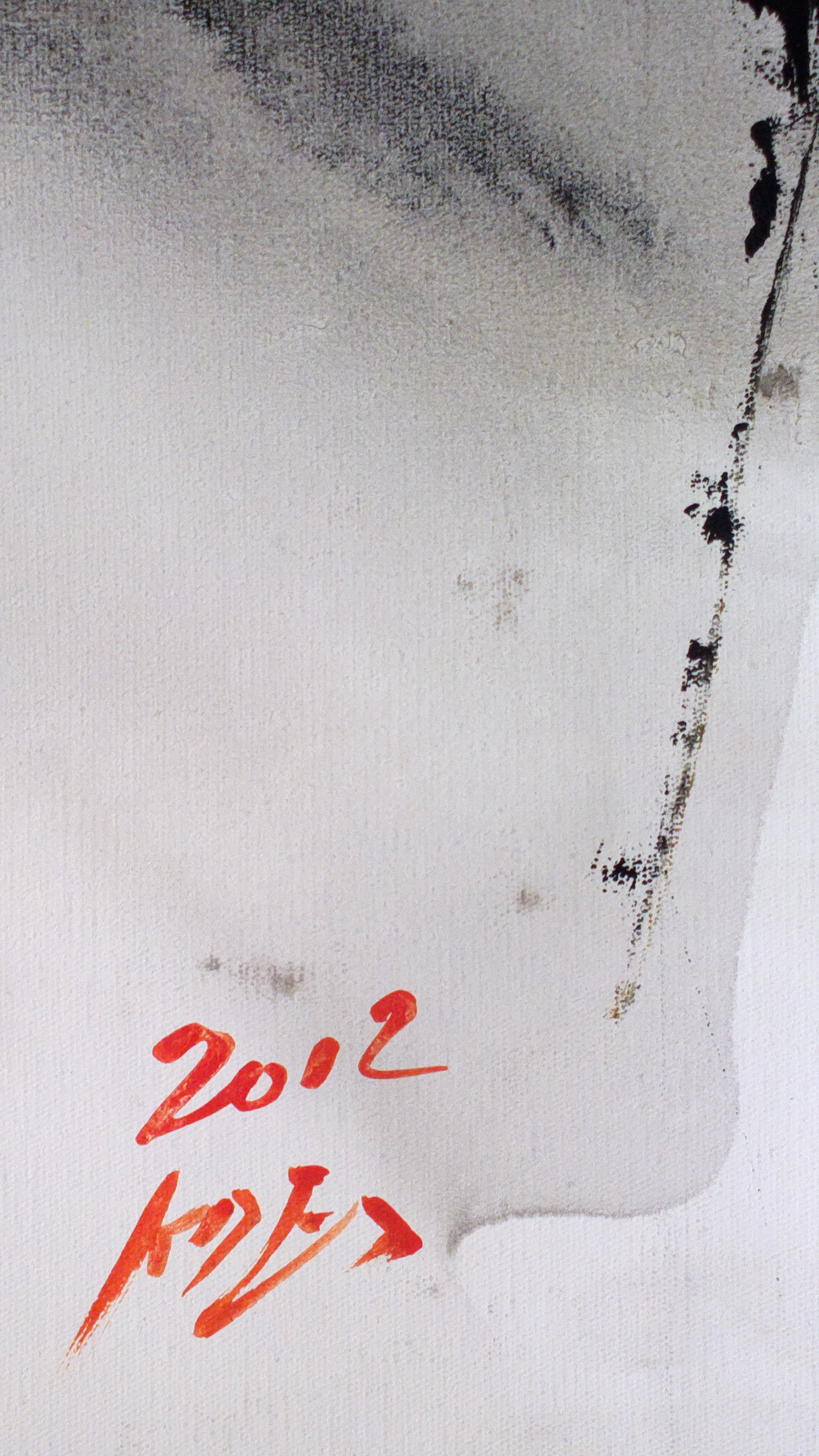
Father Kim's signature

== Bibliography ==
- Jean-Claude Pichaud: "Le Peintre et l'Alchimiste. De Brioude à Conques: Kim En Joong et Pierre Soulages" - Editions Institut Kim En Joong, giugno 2021, 64 pages, (ISBN 978-2-9577358-3-9)
- Jean-Claude Pichaud:"La métamorphose de la glaise Pablo Picasso - Kim En Joong" Editions Institut Kim En Joong, MG, giugno 2020, 47 pagine (ISBN 978-2913593855)
- Jean-Claude Pichaud:"Miracle des vitraux:Rencontre Marc Chagall-Kim En Joong" Editions du Colombier, MG, novembre 2019, 62 pagine (ISBN 978 -2913593770).
- Julien Serey et Kim en Joong, Hommage à la Paix, luglio 2018, 60 pagine
- Jean-Claude Pichaud: Avec le père Kim, pèlerinage aux quatre transfigurations; giugno 2017, Editions du Colombier-MG 84210, 60 pagine (ISBN 2-913593-65-8)
- François Cheng et Kim En Joong, Lumière Galerie Pierre Chave Vence, gennaio 2015, 30 pagine
- Denis Coutagne Kim En Joong - Selon Les Écritures Editions Pierre Chave (Institut Kim En Joong), giugno 2015, 236 pagine (ISBN 978-2-902128-00-6)
- François Cheng et Kim En Joong, Quand les âmes se font chant, postface de Nicolas-Jean Sed, Bayard, 2014, 120 pagine
- Jean-Claude Pichaud, Kim En Joong et le cabanon de Saint-Paul, Paris, Éditions du Cerf, 2013, 105 pagine (ISBN 978-2-204-09639-3)
- Joël Damase et Kim En Joong (ill.), Bourges 2012 : Kim En Joong et Olivier Messiaen : Des couleurs et des sons par Jean-Claude Pichaud, Paris, Éditions du Cerf, 2010, 60 pagine (ISBN 978-2-204-09872-4)
- Godfried Danneels et Kim En Joong (ill.), La résurrection de Verrijzenis, Paris, Éditions du Cerf, 2010, 30 pagine (ISBN 978-2-204-09286-9, OCLC 648924045)
- Joël Damase et Christiane Keller (ill.), Brioude, la basilique Saint-Julien : dans la lumière de Kim En Joong, Paris, Éditions du Cerf, 2009, 219 pagine (ISBN 978-2-204-08973-9)
- François Cheng et Kim En Joong (ill.), Vraie lumière née de vraie nuit : 24 poèmes, Paris, Éditions du Cerf, 2009, 150 pagine (ISBN 978-2-204-09074-2)
- Jean-François Lagier, Sonia Lesot et Henri Gaud, Kim En Joong : vitraux, Paris, Éditions du Cerf, 2009, 223 pagine (ISBN 978-2-204-09034-6)
- Cardinal Godfried Danneels La Résurrection Dix triptyques lithographiques 30x99 cm, Éditions du Cerf 2007
- Jean Thuillier, Kim En Joong, Peintre de la lumière, Paris, Éditions du Cerf, 2005, 233 pagine (ISBN 978-2-204-07749-1)
- Cardinal Godfried Danneels Kim En Joong, La Croix Dix triptyques lithographiques 30x99 cm, Éditions du Cerf 2002
- Guy Bedouelle Kim En Joong, Rythmes, Huit lithographies 61x37 cm, Editions Pierre Chave 2000
- Timothy Radcliffe, Bernard Antonioz et Edmond Dargent, Kim En Joong, Paris, Éditions du Cerf, 1997, 239 pagine (ISBN 2-204-05778-9)
- Jean Thuilier Kim En Joong, Rêves de couleurs, Douze lithographies en couleur 40x29 cm, Éditions Pierre Chave 1991
- Julien Green Kim En Joong, Fragments d'un monde inconnu. Éditions du Cerf 1996 Douze lithographies en couleur 40x29 cm Éditions Pierre Chave 1991
