= Brax, Haute-Garonne =

Brax
- Commune
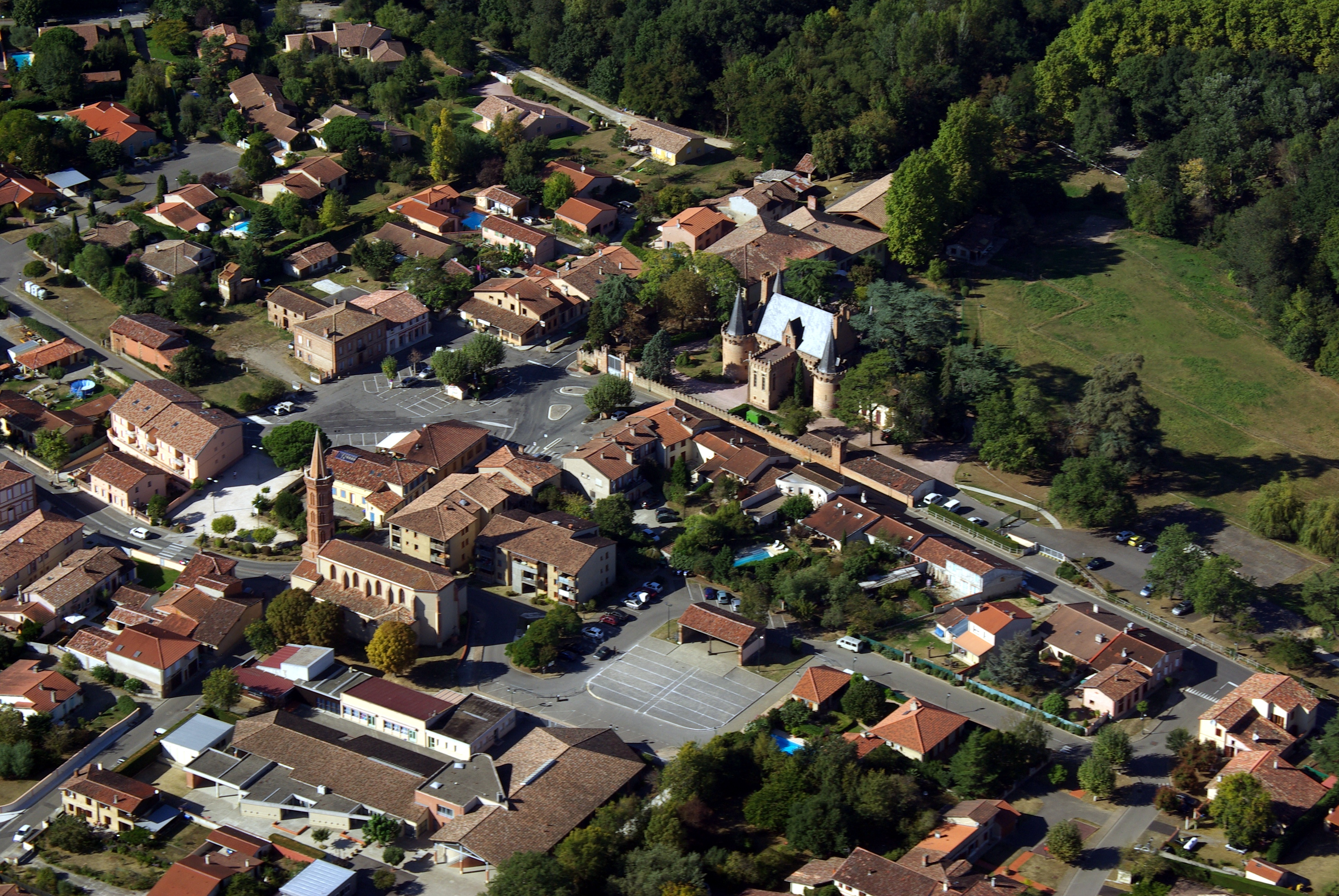
- An aerial view of Brax

- Coat of arms
- Location of Brax
- Location within France Location within Occitanie
- Coordinates: 43°36′53″N 1°14′24″E
- Country: France
- Region: Occitania
- Department: Haute-Garonne
- Arrondissement: Toulouse
- Canton: Toulouse-7
- Intercommunality: Toulouse Métropole

Government
  - Mayor (2020–2026): Thierry Zanatta
- Area^{1}: 4.42 km^{2} (1.71 sq mi)
- Elevation: 193 m (633 ft)
- Highest elevation: 240 m (790 ft)
- Lowest elevation: 165 m (541 ft)
- Population (2023): 3,037
  - Density: 687/km^{2} (1,780/sq mi)
- Demonym(s): Braxian (en) braxéen(ne) (fr)
- Time zone: UTC+01:00 (CET)
  - Summer (DST): UTC+02:00 (CEST)
- INSEE/Postal code: 31088 /31490
- Website: www.mairie-brax31.fr
- ^{1} French Land Register data, which excludes lakes, ponds, glaciers > 1 km^{2} (0.386 sq mi or 247 acres) and river estuaries.

Brax (French pronunciation: [bʁaks]; Occitan: Brats) is a commune in the Haute-Garonne department in the Occitanie region.

It is situated near the regional capital Toulouse near the Forêt de Bouconne. The village is part of the Toulouse Métropole.

== Population ==
The inhabitants of the commune are known as Braxéens in French.

Historical population
| Year | Pop. | ±% p.a. |
|---|---|---|
| 1968 | 458 | — |
| 1975 | 902 | +10.17% |
| 1982 | 1,202 | +4.19% |
| 1990 | 1,358 | +1.54% |
| 1999 | 2,017 | +4.49% |
| 2007 | 2,393 | +2.16% |
| 2012 | 2,703 | +2.47% |
| 2017 | 2,811 | +0.79% |
| 2023 | 3,037 | +1.30% |
Source: INSEE

== Transportation ==
Access to Brax is on the Route Nationale 124 or the SNCF line between Toulouse and Auch at the train station.

== Sights ==
The ruined castle, the Château de Brax, dates back to the 13th century. During the Second World War, the resistance group Réseau Morhange of Marcel Taillandier used the castle as its headquarters.

== Politics ==
List of Mayors of Brax
| Term | Name of Mayor | Party |
|---|---|---|
| 1808–1809 | François Roume | |
| 1809–1815 | Jean Fauré | |
| 1815–1821 | Georges Versevy | |
| 1821–1832 | Bernard d'Izarni de Gargas | |
| 1832–1834 | Bernard Paris | |
| 1834–1855 | Jean-Marie Latrille | |
| 1855–1865 | Auguste d'Arboussier | |
| 1865–1880 | Antoine Lannes | |
| 1881–1888 | Jean Barrué | |
| 1888–1920 | Charles de Pins Montbrun | |
| 1920–1929 | Alban Libès | |
| 1929–1961 | Léon Gailhaguet | |
| 1961–1969 | Marcel Cardonne | |
| 1969–1983 | Georges Bastien | |
| 1983–1989 | Robert Clasou | |
| 1989–2001 | Bernard Cunnac | PS |
| 2001–2014 | Jean-Pierre Vergé | PS |
| 2014–2020 | François Lépineux | |
| 2020–incumbent | Thierry Zanatta | |

== Monuments ==
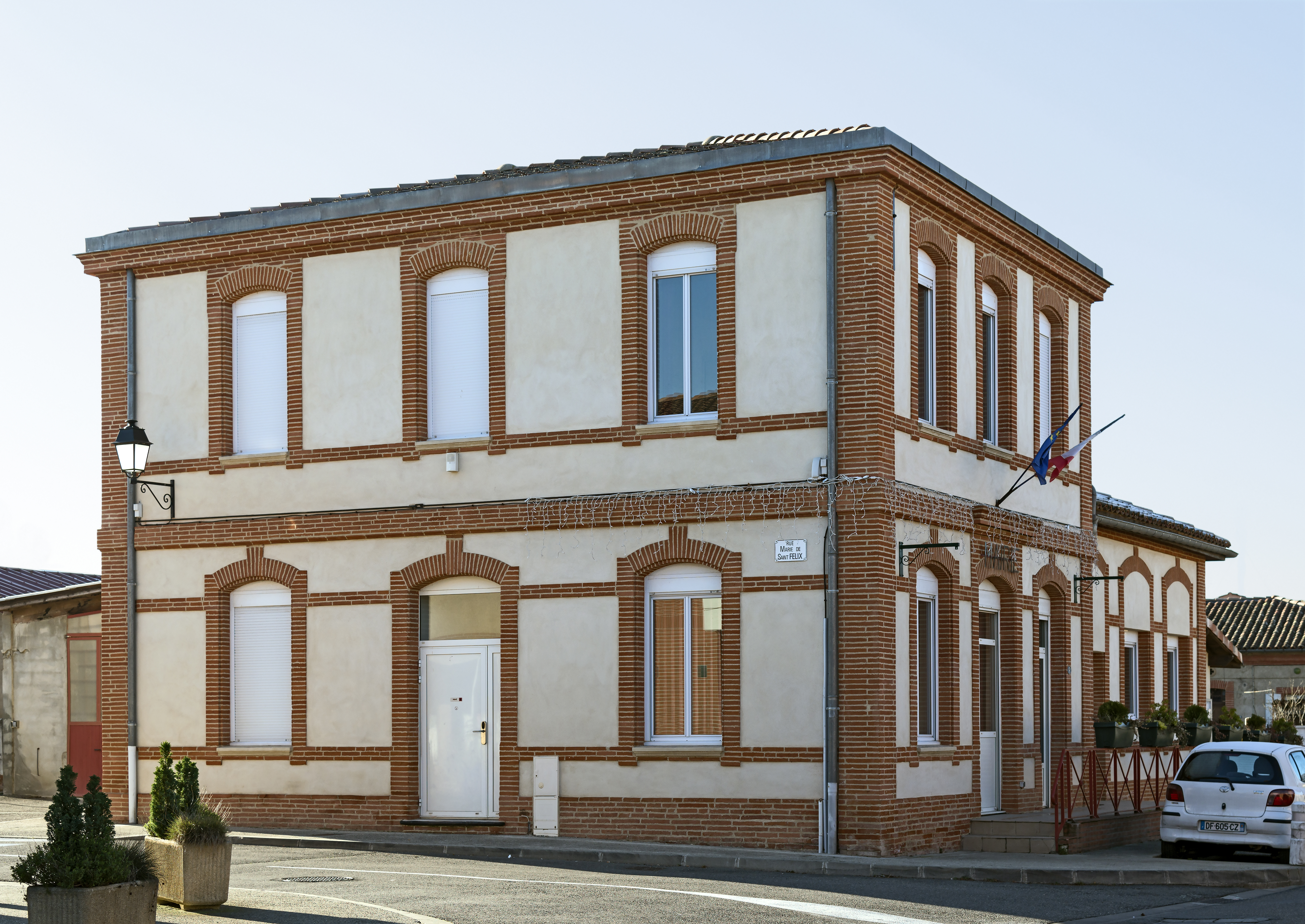
Town hall

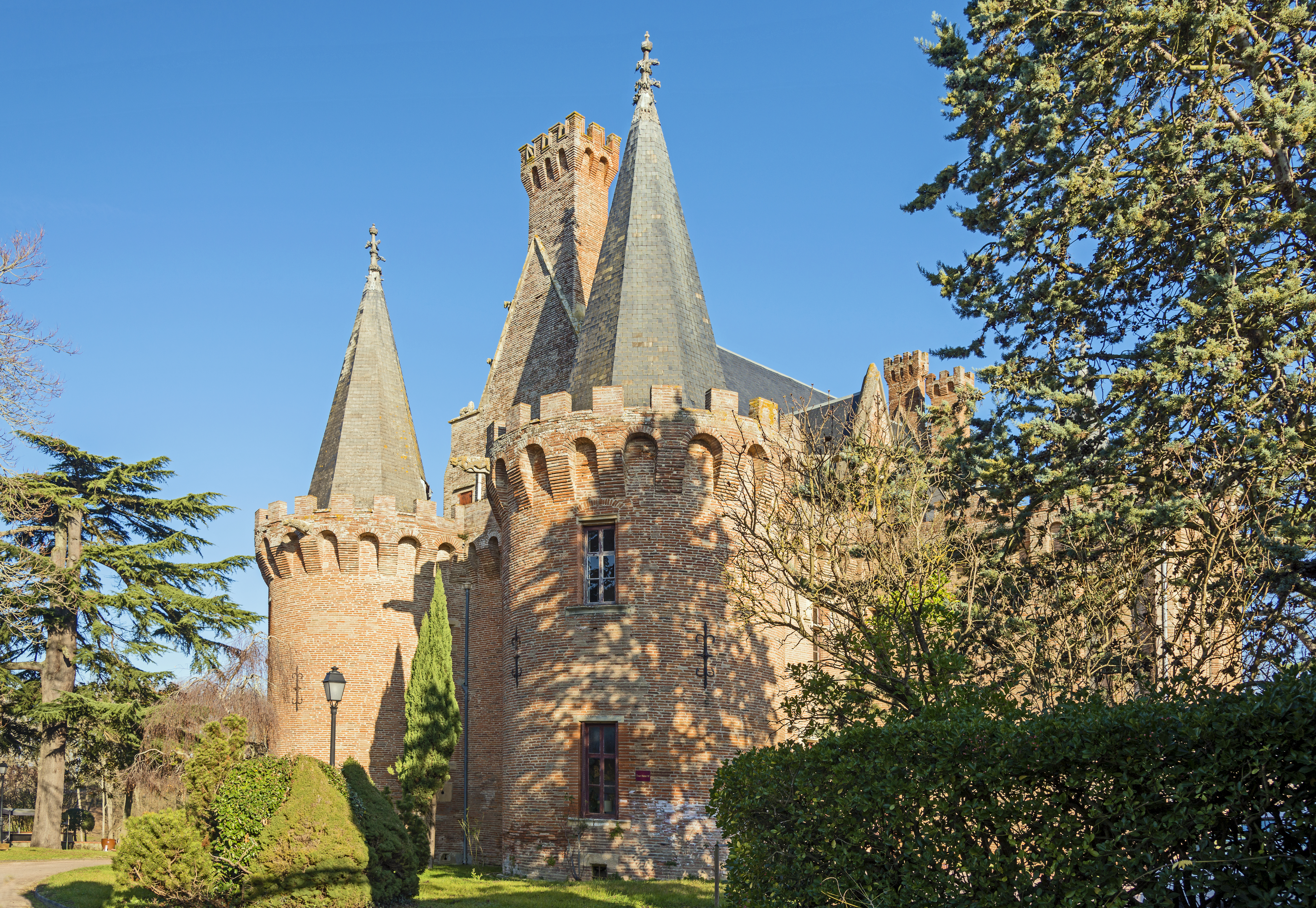
Castle

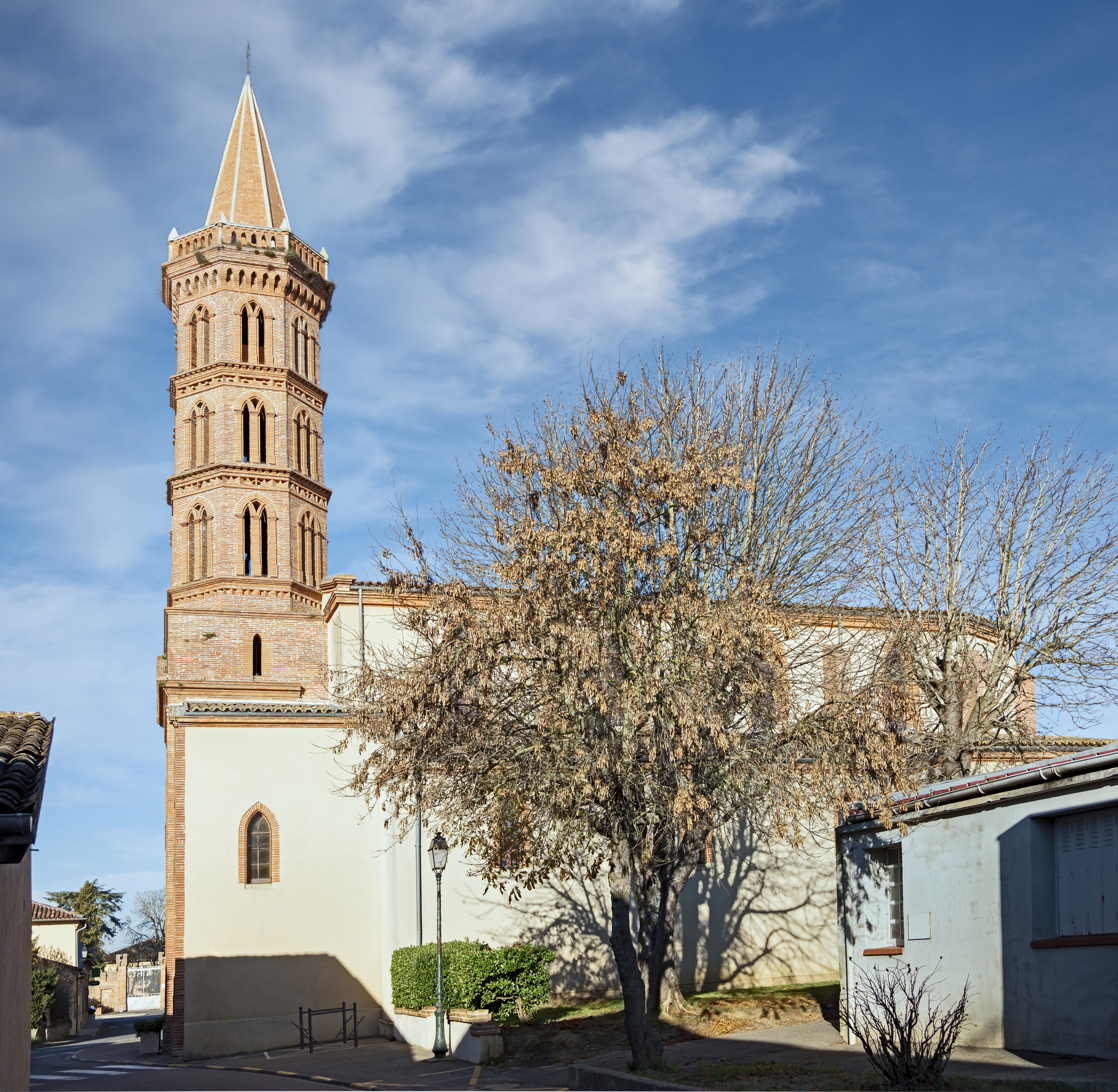
Saint-Orens Church

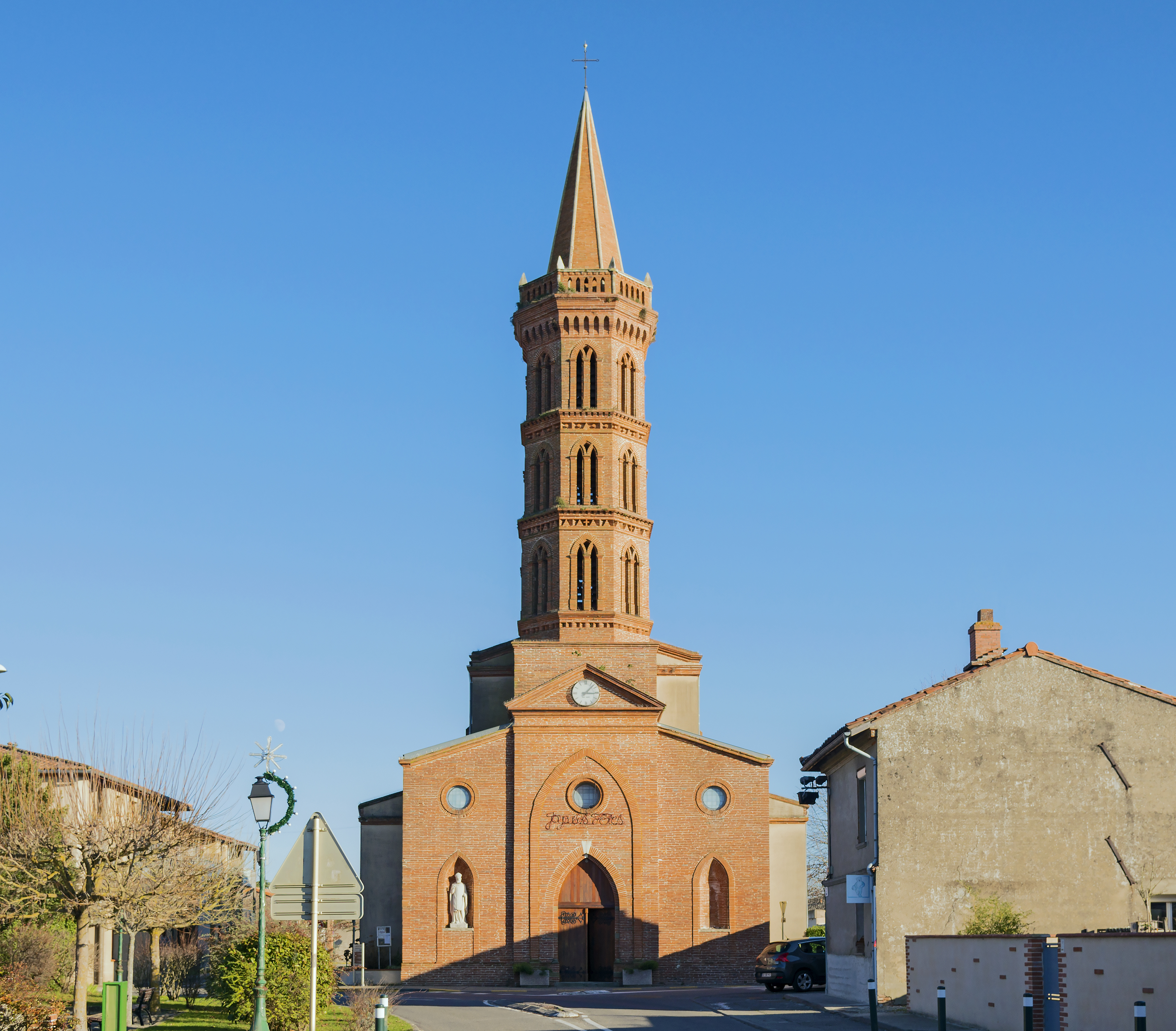
Church facade

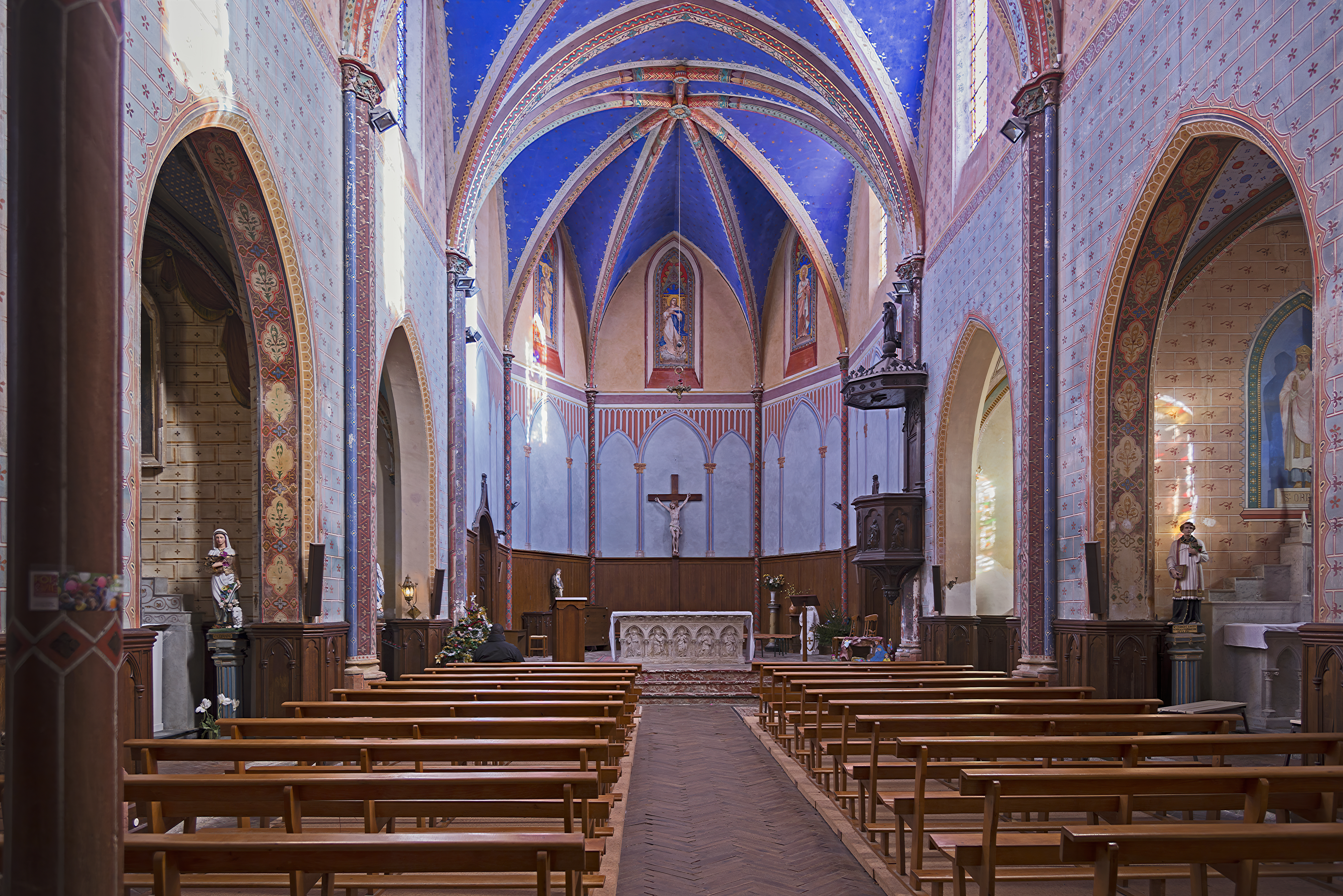
Church interior

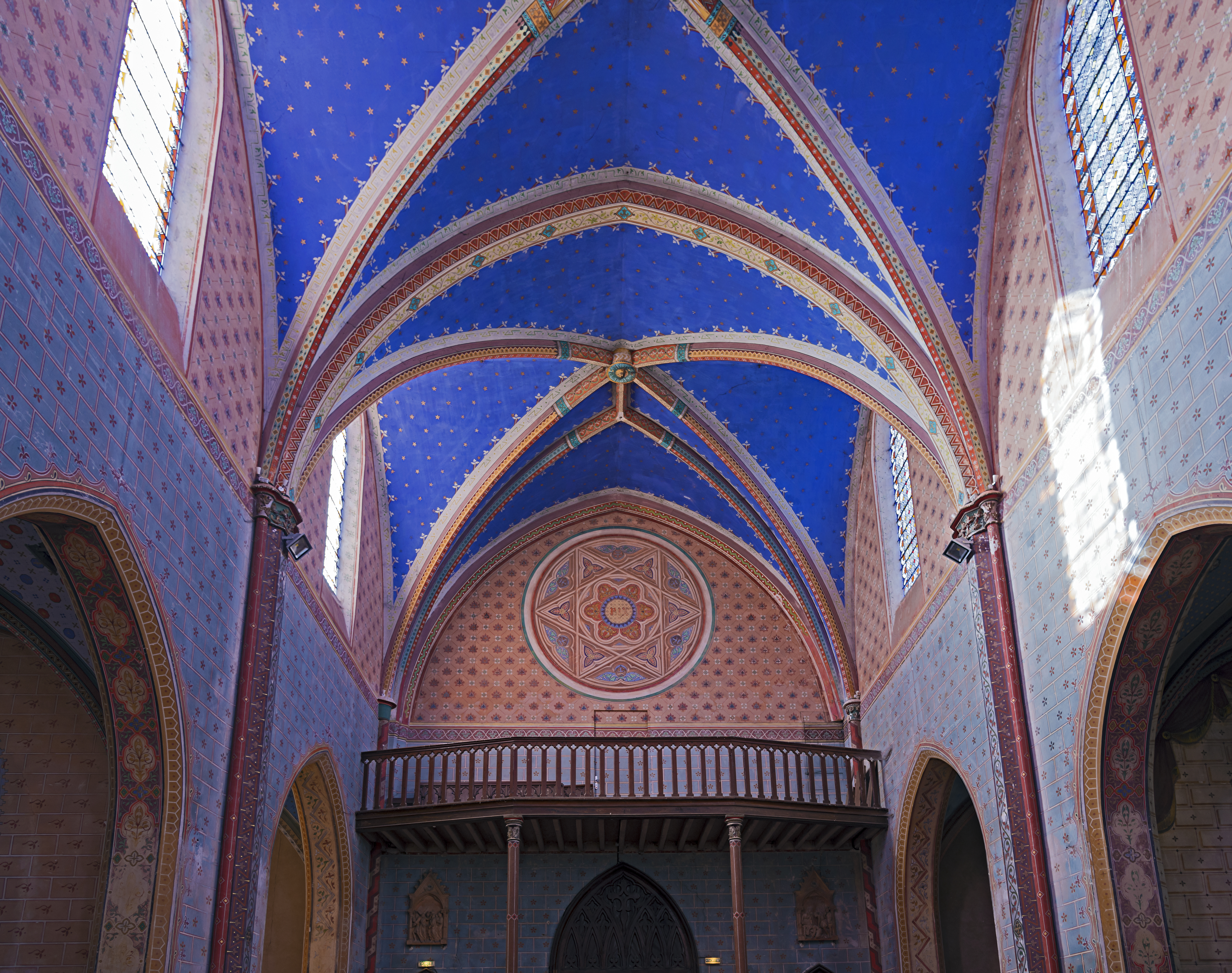
Church ceiling

== See also ==
- Communes of the Haute-Garonne department
