= Jean-Louis Gilet =

French architect

- Born: August 21, 1902; Toulouse
- Died: September 7, 1964 (aged 62); Toulouse
- Occupation: Architect
- Father: Joseph Gilet

Jean-Louis Gilet (August 21, 1902, in Toulouse – September 7, 1964, in Toulouse) in the same city, was a French architect.

== Biography ==
He studied at the École des Beaux-Arts de Toulouse until 1918. He then studied with Victor Laloux and Charles Lemaresquier at the École nationale supérieure des beaux-arts in Paris, graduating in 1932.

He was an architect associated with his father Joseph Gilet from 1932, then his successor until 1962.

He is a member of the Société archéologique du Midi de la France, the Société des artistes méridionaux, the Société des artistes toulousains, and président de l'Académie des arts de Toulouse. In 1935 he relaunched the magazine "Art sudional" of which he was the editorial director and an important contributor.

He taught at the École supérieure des beaux-arts from 1937. He was director of the Toulouse Regional School of Architecture from 1942 to 1944 then from 1952.

From the 1950s, he became the owner of château de Brax.

== Primary works ==
- 1932: Bancal Building, 54 rue de Bayard, with Joseph Gilet.
- 1933: Buildings in the Gontaud-Biron housing estate, 4 and 6 rue de la Brasserie, with Joseph Gilet, Toulouse, Monument historique (2018).
- 1933: Building, 4 rue des Potiers, with Joseph Gilet.
- 1936: Maison Fabre, 8 rue Mireille.
- 1936: Villa Bisseuil, 126 avenue Raymond-Naves, with Joseph Gilet.
- 1937: Pharmacie Subra, 1 avenue Honoré-Serres, with Joseph Gilet.
