= Joseph Gilet =

French architect

- Born: July 8, 1876; Toulouse, France
- Died: April 13, 1943 (aged 66); Toulouse, France
- Occupation: Architect
- Children: Jean-Louis Gilet

Joseph Gilet (July 8, 1876, Toulouse – May 13, 1943, Toulouse) was a French architect.

== Biography ==
He studied at the École des Beaux-Arts de Toulouse from 1888 to 1895. He was then a student of Victor Laloux at the École nationale supérieure des beaux-arts de Paris, graduating in 1903.

He was an architect in Toulouse, in collaboration with Louis Berty, then associated with his son Jean-Louis Gilet from 1932. He was mobilized during the First World War and was decorated with the Croix de Guerre.

He taught at the École des beaux-arts de Toulouse from 1907 to 1914 then from 1919 to 1927. He was a member of the Departmental Conseil départemental des bâtiments civils de la Haute-Garonne from 1921 to 1929.

He was president of the Société régionale des architectes du Midi de la France then vice-president of the council of the Order of Architects of Toulouse when it was created in 1941.

== Primary works ==
- around 1903: Building, 5 rue Théodore-Ozenne in Toulouse.
- 1905–1909: Hôtel de la Caisse d'Épargne, rue du Languedoc in Toulouse.
- 1907: Building, 69 allée de Brienne in Toulouse.
- 1908: Building, 18 bis allée Frédéric-Mistral in Toulouse.
- 1923: House, 35 rue de la Balance in Toulouse.
- 1932: Bancal Building, 54 rue de Bayard in Toulouse, with Jean-Louis Gilet.
- 1933–1935: Boys' school, boulevard du Midi in Toulouse, labeled 20th century heritage.
- 1933: Buildings in the Gontaud-Biron housing estate, 4 and 6 rue de la Brasserie in Toulouse, with Jean-Louis Gilet Monument historique (2018).
- 1933: Building, 4 rue des Potiers in Toulouse, with Jean-Louis Gilet.
- 1936: Villa Bisseuil, 126 avenue Raymond-Naves in Toulouse, with Jean-Louis Gilet.
- 1937: Pharmacie Subra, 1 avenue Honoré-Serres in Toulouse, with Jean-Louis Gilet.
- 1937: Town hall-school of Quint-Fonsegrives.
