= Réseau Morhange =

Réseau Morhange (French pronunciation: [ʁezo mɔʁɑ̃ʒ], "Morhange network") was a French resistance group created in 1943 by Marcel Taillandier in Toulouse. The group organised direct action and counterintelligence against the German occupiers and collaborators of Vichy France.

== The Morhange Group ==
The group was constituted of 82 agents officially engaged in the conflict against Nazi Germany. Morhange was a Counterintelligence organisation against the counterintelligence of the Gestapo and the Abwehr. In 1940, Commandeur Paillole was responsible for the counterintelligence services of the Vichy army. However he continued to work with the British services against the German intelligence Abwehr whose objective was to track down French resistance fighters. In November 1942, when Nazi Germany invaded Vichy France, Paillole fled to Spain before reaching London where he was welcomed by members of the Secret Intelligence Service before being transferred to Algiers. Paillole orders reached Marchel Taillandier who led the Morhange group and the French resistance in Toulouse against the German occupier.

== Connections with other groups ==
The Morhange Group operated with other groups in the Toulouse area:

- The groups of Marie Dissard and of Albert Guérisse who hid and smuggled allied soldiers all across France into Spain via the Pyrenees
- The socialist group "Libérer Fédérer" of Silvio Trentin, an anti-fascist Italian.
- The VIRA group.
- The Franc-Tireur movement.
- Libération-sud.
- The Combat French resistance group.
- The Armée secrète.

== The Lost Airman ==
Seth Meyerowitz in his book The Lost Airman (Atlantic Books, London) writes about his grandfather Arthur Meyerowitz, who was in the crew of a B-24 bomber Harmful Lil Armful during a bombing run over occupied France. The B-24 was badly damaged by German anti-aircraft 88mm cannons and Arthur parachuted out of his stricken plane over Nazi-German-occupied France, eventually escaping with the help of the resistance through Spain and Gibraltar back via Bristol, England to the United States. Arthur was indebted to many that helped him and the Morhange resistance, especially Marcel Taillandier. The book ends with 18 pages of carefully researched notes relating to France during the period December 1943 to June 1944.

=== Film adaptation ===
In 2017, Jake Gyllenhaal was attached to star in and produce a feature film adaptation for Amazon. In 2025, Gyllenhaal moved the film adaptation to A24, which he would only stay as an executive producer, with Jeremy Allen White portraying Arthur Meyerowitz, Ben Shattuck adapting the book, and Ben Stiller directing.
