= Château de Brax =

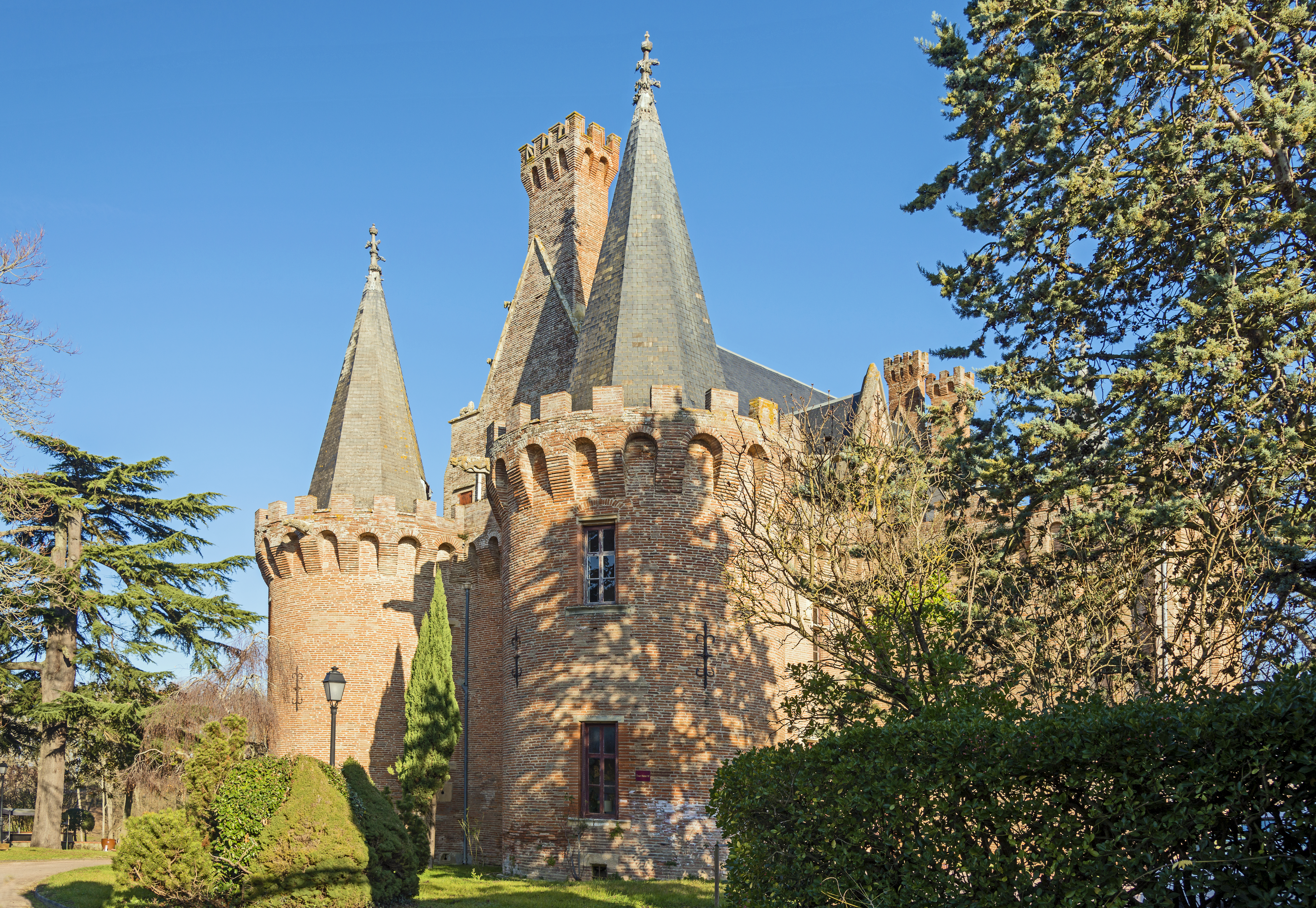
- Le chateau de Brax

- Location within France

General information
- Location: Brax; Haute Garonne; France
- Coordinates: 43°37′02″N 1°14′29″E

The Château de Brax is a castle in the commune of Brax in the Haute-Garonne département of France. Originally constructed in the 13th century, there were alterations and additions in the 16th and 18th centuries.

== Description ==
The structure is enclosed by four circular towers. The rear façade incorporates the grand staircase. The brick walls are crenellated. The front opens onto parkland; access is by a double staircase. A round walk carried on machicolations formed of brick corbels and blind arcades circles the whole building.

Privately owned, it has been listed since 1946 as a monument historique by the French Ministry of Culture.

== See also ==
- List of castles in France
