= TER Midi-Pyrénées =

French regional rail network

Overview
- Website: http://www.sncf.com/en/trains/ter

Technical
- Track gauge: 1,435 mm (4 ft 8 1/2 in) standard gauge

TER Midi Pyrénées was the regional rail network serving the Midi-Pyrénées region in southwest France. The centre of the network was Toulouse-Matabiau station. In 2017 it was merged into the new TER Occitanie.

== Characteristics ==
The network has 173 train stations and rail stops, as well as 241 road stops. There is 1500 km of tracks, carrying 330 trains per day and about 30,000 passengers a day. Annual revenue in 2009 was €47.3 million.

== Network ==
=== Rail ===
Line	Route	Frequency	Notes
2	Toulouse-Matabiau – Montrabé† – Gragnague† – Montastruc-la-Conseillère† – Roqueserière-Buzet† – Saint-Sulpice-sur-Tarn – Rabastens-Couffouleux – Lisle-sur-Tarn† – Gaillac – Tessonnières† – Marssac-sur-Tarn† – Albi-Ville – Albi-Madeleine – Carmaux – Naucelle – Baraqueville – Luc-Primaube – Rodez	8× per day Toulouse–Rodez, 7× per day Toulouse–Carmaux, 2× per day Toulouse–Albi-Ville	
3	Toulouse-Matabiau – Saint-Sulpice-sur-Tarn – Lisle-sur-Tarn – Gaillac – Cordes-Vindrac – Lexos – Laguépie – Najac – Villefranche-de-Rouergue – Salles-Courbatiès – Capdenac – Figeac – Bagnac – Maurs – Boisset† – Le Rouget – Pers† – Lacapelle-Viescamp† – Viescamp-sous-Jallès† – Ytrac† – Aurillac	3× per day Toulouse–Aurillac, 3× per day Toulouse–Figeac, 1× per day Capdenac–Aurillac, 1× per day Figeac–Aurillac	
5	Brive-la-Gaillarde – Turenne† – Les Quatre Routes† – Saint-Denis-près-Martel – Rocamadour-Padirac – Gramat – Assier – Figeac – Capdenac – Viviez-Decazeville – Aubin† – Cransac† – Saint-Christophe – Rodez	6× per day Brive-la-Gaillarde–Rodez, 1× per day Brive-la-Gaillarde–Capdenac, 1× per day Figeac–Rodez	
6	Rodez – Laissac – Sévérac-le-Château – Millau	3× per day	
14	Brive-la-Gaillarde – Gignac-Cressensac† – Souillac – Gourdon – Dégagnac† – Cahors – Lalbenque-Fontanes† – Caussade – Albias† – Montauban-Ville-Bourbon – Montbartier† – Dieupentale† – Grisolles† – Castelnau-d'Estrétefonds† – Saint-Jory† – Lacourtensourt† – Toulouse-Matabiau	3× per day Brive-la-Gaillarde–Toulouse, 1× per day Brive-la-Gaillarde–Cahors, 2× per day Cahors–Toulouse	
15	Montauban-Ville-Bourbon – Montbartier† – Dieupentale† – Grisolles – Castelnau-d'Estrétefonds – Saint-Jory – Fenouillet-Saint-Alban† – Lacourtensourt† – Lalande-Église† – Route-de-Launaguet† – Toulouse-Matabiau	7× per day Montauban–Toulouse, 2× per day Fenouillet-Saint-Alban–Toulouse, see also lines 14 and 16	
16	Agen – Saint-Nicolas-Saint-Romain† – Lamagistère† – Valence-d'Agen – Pommevic† – Malause† – Moissac – Castelsarrasin – La Ville-Dieu† – Montauban-Ville-Bourbon – Montbartier† – Dieupentale† – Grisolles† – Castelnau-d'Estrétefonds† – Saint-Jory† – Lacourtensourt† – Toulouse-Matabiau	7× per day Agen–Toulouse, 1× per day Agen–Montauban, some trains continue toward Bordeaux (see TER Aquitaine) or Castelnaudary (see line 20)	
17	Toulouse-Matabiau – Montrabé† – Montastruc-la-Conseillère† – Saint-Sulpice-sur-Tarn – Les Cauquillous† – Lavaur – Damiatte-Saint-Paul – Vielmur-sur-Agout – Castres – Labruguière – Mazamet	10x per day Toulouse–Mazamet, 1× per day Toulouse–Castres	
20	Toulouse-Matabiau – Montaudran† – Labège-Innopole – Labège-Village† – Escalquens – Montlaur† – Baziège – Villenouvelle† – Villefranche-de-Lauragais – Avignonet† – Castelnaudary – Bram – Carcassonne	8× per day Toulouse–Carcassonne, 2× per day Toulouse–Castelnaudary, some trains continue toward Narbonne (see TER Languedoc-Roussillon) or Agen (see line 16)	
21	Toulouse-Matabiau – Toulouse-Saint-Agne – Gallieni-Cancéropôle† – Toulouse-Saint-Cyprien-Arènes – Lardenne† – Colomiers – Colomiers-Lycée International – Pibrac – Brax-Léguevin – Mérenvielle† – L'Isle-Jourdain – Gimont-Cahuzac – Aubiet – Auch	9× per day Toulouse–Auch, 11× per day Toulouse–L'Isle-Jourdain	
22	Toulouse-Matabiau – Toulouse-Saint-Agne – Portet-Saint-Simon – Pins-Justaret† – Venerque-le-Vernet† – Auterive – Cintegabelle – Saverdun – Le Vernet-d'Ariège – Pamiers – Varilhes† – Saint-Jean-de-Verges† – Foix – Tarascon-sur-Ariège – Les Cabannes – Luzenac-Garanou – Ax-les-Thermes – Mérens-les-Vals – Andorre-L'Hospitalet – Porté-Puymorens – Latour-de-Carol-Enveitg	5× per day Toulouse–Latour-de-Carol, 4× per day Toulouse–Ax-les-Thermes, 5× per day Toulouse–Foix, 1× per day Toulouse–Pamiers	
24	Toulouse-Matabiau – Toulouse-Saint-Agne – Portet-Saint-Simon† – Muret – Le Fauga† – Longages-Noé† – Carbonne† – Cazères-sur-Garonne† – Martres-Tolosane† – Boussens – Saint-Martory† – Lestelle† – Labarthe-Inard† – Saint-Gaudens – Montréjeau-Gourdan-Polignan – Lannemezan – Capvern† – Tournay – Tarbes – Ossun – Lourdes – Coarraze-Nay – Pau	3× per day Toulouse–Pau, 1× per day Toulouse–Lourdes, 5× per day Toulouse–Tarbes, 5× per day Toulouse–Montréjeau-Gourdan-Polignan, 1× per day Toulouse–Boussens	
26	Montréjeau-Gourdan-Polignan – Loures-Barbazan – Saléchan-Siradan – Marignac-Saint-Béat – Luchon	1× per day Toulouse–Montréjeau–Luchon, see line 24 for the section Toulouse–Montréjeau	
38	Brive-la-Gaillarde ... Aurillac (see TER Auvergne line 21 for details)		
† Not all trains call at this station

=== Road ===
- Rodez – Millau
- Millau – Saint-Affrique
- Villefranche-de-Rouergue – Decazeville
- Capdenac – Decazeville
- Souillac – Saint-Denis-lès-Martel
- Montauban – Albi
- Cahors – Figeac – Capdenac
- Cahors – Fumel – Monsempron-Libos
- Mazamet – Saint-Pons-de-Thomières
- Castelnaudary – Revel – Sorèze
- Boussens – Saint-Girons – Aulus-les-Bains – Guzet
- Lourdes – Argelès-Gazost – Pierrefitte-Nestalas – Cauterets
- Pierrefitte-Nestalas – Luz-Saint-Sauveur – Barèges
- Tarbes – Lannemezan – Arreau – Saint-Lary-Soulan – Piau-Engaly
- Tarbes – Bagnères-de-Bigorre – La Mongie
- Tarbes – Mont-de-Marsan – Dax
- Tarbes – Miélan – Auch
- Auch – Fleurance – Lectoure – Agen
- Muret – Longages – Saint-Sulpice-sur-Lèze

== Rolling stock ==
=== Multiple units ===
- SNCF Class Z 7300
- SNCF Class Z 21500
- SNCF Class X 2100
- SNCF Class X 72500
- SNCF Class X 73500
- SNCF Class B 81500 Also called BGC B 81500

=== Locomotives ===
- SNCF Class BB 7200
- SNCF Class BB 8500
- SNCF Class BB 9300
- SNCF Class BB 67400

== Structures ==
- Viaduc du Viaur

== See also ==
- SNCF
- Transport express régional
- Réseau Ferré de France
- List of SNCF stations in Midi-Pyrénées
- Midi-Pyrénées
