= Castagne =

Castagne is a surname. Notable people with the surname include:

- Jean Louis Martin Castagne (1785–1858), French botanist
- Joseph Castagné (1875–1958), French ethnographer
- Patrick Castagne (1916–2000), Trinidadian composer
- Timothy Castagne (born 1995), Belgian footballer
