= Lestelle station =

Railway station in Lestelle-de-Saint-Martory, France

Lestelle

General information
- Location: Lestelle-de-Saint-Martory, Haute-Garonne, Occitanie, France
- Coordinates: 43°07′08″N 0°54′48″E
- Line: Toulouse–Bayonne railway
- Platforms: 2
- Tracks: 2

Other information
- Station code: 87611111

History
- Opened: 1908
Location

Lestelle is a former railway station in Lestelle-de-Saint-Martory, Occitanie, France. The station is on the Toulouse–Bayonne railway line. The station was served by TER (local) services operated by the SNCF.

It is located at an altitude of 299m and is situated at kilometer point (PK) 74.607 of the Toulouse to Bayonne line, between Saint-Martory and Labarthe-Inard stations.
