= Castelnau-d'Estrétefonds station =

Railway station in Occitanie, France

Castelnau-d'Estrétefonds
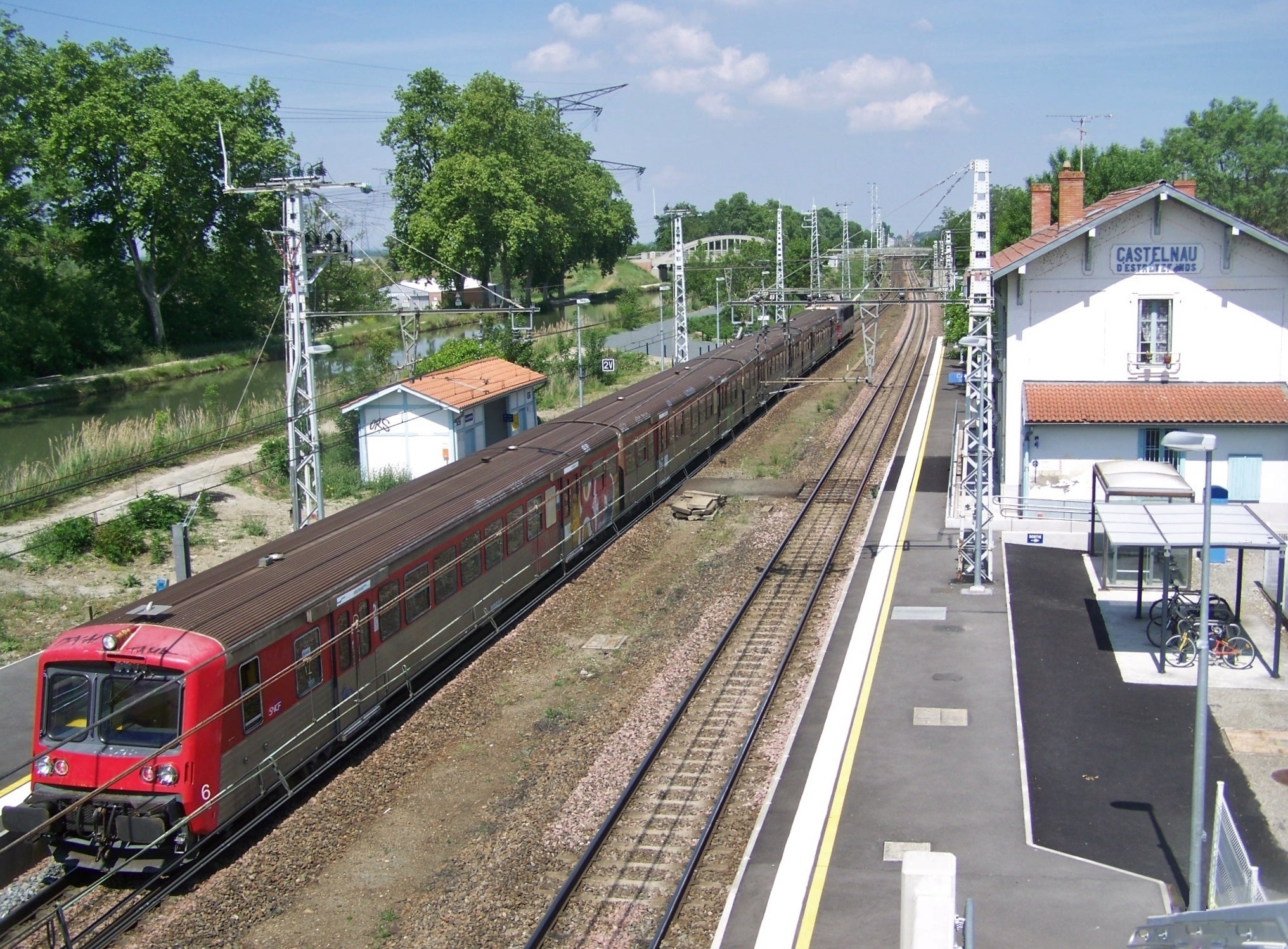

General information
- Location: Castelnau-d'Estrétefonds, Haute-Garonne; Occitanie, France
- Coordinates: 43°47′09″N 1°20′31″E
- Owner: SNCF
- Operator: SNCF
- Line: Bordeaux–Sète railway
- Platforms: 2
- Tracks: 2

Other information
- Station code: 87611665

History
- Opening: 30 August 1856

Passengers
- 2018: 201 012

Services
Preceding station	TER Occitanie	Following station
Montauban towards Agen	18	Toulouse Terminus
Grisolles towards Brive-la-Gaillarde	19	Saint-Jory towards Toulouse
Location

Castelnau-d'Estrétefonds is a railway station in Castelnau-d'Estrétefonds, Occitanie, France. The station is located on the Bordeaux–Sète railway. The station is served by TER (local) services operated by SNCF.

== Train services ==
The following services currently call at Castelnau-d'Estrétefonds:

- local service (TER Occitanie) Brive-la-Gaillarde – Cahors – Montauban – Toulouse
- local service (TER Occitanie) Montauban – Toulouse
- local service (TER Occitanie) Agen – Montauban – Toulouse
