= Marssac-sur-Tarn =

- Commune
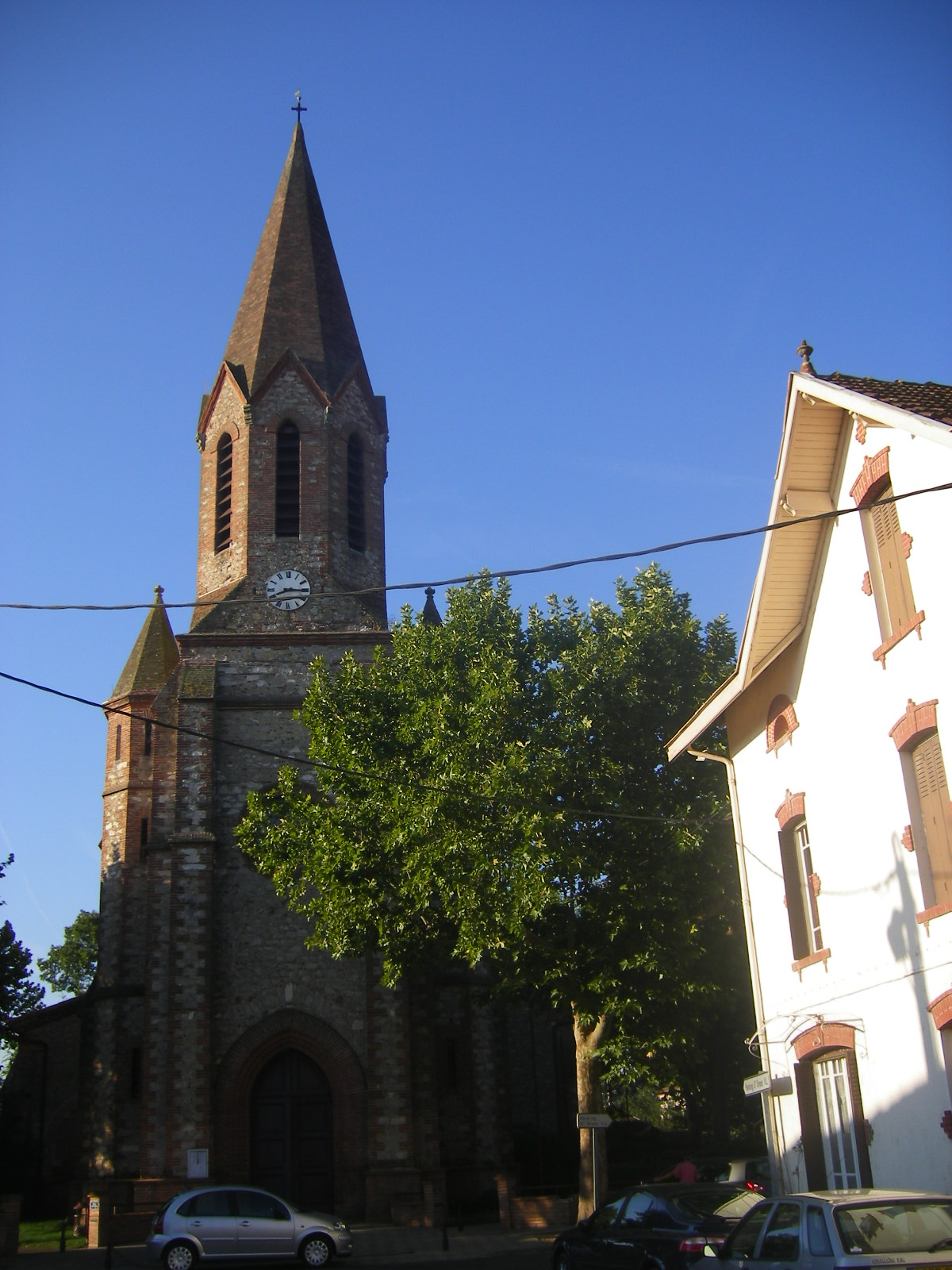
- The church in Marssac

- Coat of arms
- Location of Marssac-sur-Tarn
- Location within France Location within Occitanie
- Coordinates: 43°55′06″N 2°01′45″E
- Country: France
- Region: Occitania
- Department: Tarn
- Arrondissement: Albi
- Canton: Albi-3
- Intercommunality: CA Albigeois

Government
  - Mayor (2020–2026): Anne-Marie Rosé
- Area^{1}: 7.17 km^{2} (2.77 sq mi)
- Elevation: 148 m (486 ft)
- Highest elevation: 167 m (548 ft)
- Lowest elevation: 135 m (443 ft)
- Population (2023): 3,518
  - Density: 491/km^{2} (1,270/sq mi)
- Time zone: UTC+01:00 (CET)
  - Summer (DST): UTC+02:00 (CEST)
- INSEE/Postal code: 81156 /81150
- ^{1} French Land Register data, which excludes lakes, ponds, glaciers > 1 km^{2} (0.386 sq mi or 247 acres) and river estuaries.

Marssac-sur-Tarn (French pronunciation: [maʁsak syʁ taʁn], literally Marssac on Tarn; Occitan: Marçac de Tarn) is a commune in the Tarn department in southern France.

== Population ==
Historical population
Year	Pop.	±% p.a.
1968	1,048	—
1975	1,414	+4.37%
1982	1,704	+2.70%
1990	2,194	+3.21%
1999	2,392	+0.96%
2007	2,823	+2.09%
2012	2,988	+1.14%
2017	3,200	+1.38%
2023	3,518	+1.59%
Source: INSEE

== Transport ==
Marssac-sur-Tarn station has rail connections to Toulouse, Albi and Rodez.

== See also ==
- Communes of the Tarn department
