= Coufouleux =

- Commune
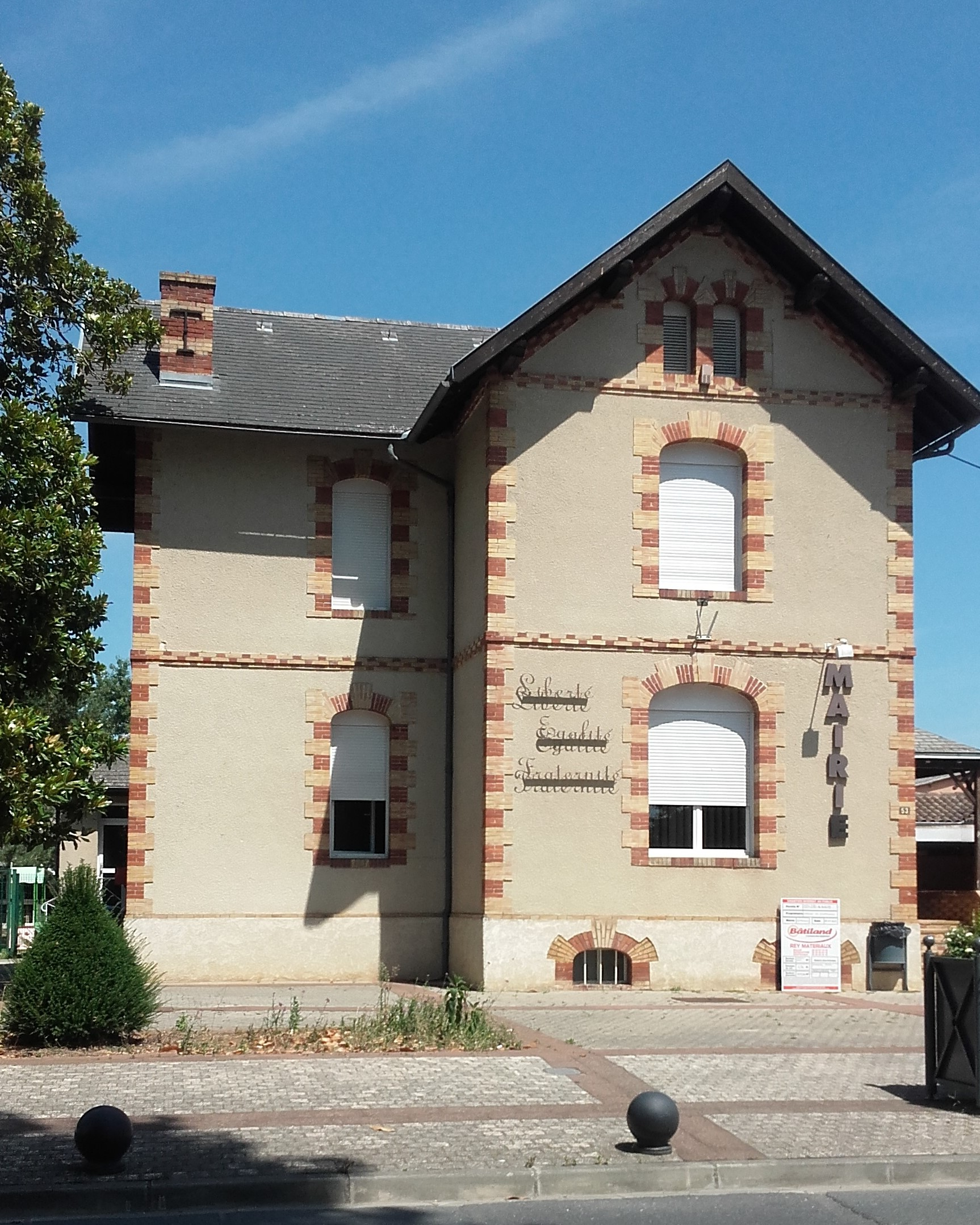
- Town hall

- Coat of arms
- Location of Coufouleux
- Location within France Location within Occitanie
- Coordinates: 43°49′06″N 1°43′54″E
- Country: France
- Region: Occitania
- Department: Tarn
- Arrondissement: Albi
- Canton: Les Portes du Tarn
- Intercommunality: CA Gaillac-Graulhet

Government
  - Mayor (2020–2026): Olivier Damez-Fontaine
- Area^{1}: 27.16 km^{2} (10.49 sq mi)
- Elevation: 122 m (400 ft)
- Highest elevation: 148 m (486 ft)
- Lowest elevation: 95 m (312 ft)
- Population (2023): 3,057
  - Density: 112.6/km^{2} (291.5/sq mi)
- Time zone: UTC+01:00 (CET)
  - Summer (DST): UTC+02:00 (CEST)
- INSEE/Postal code: 81070 /81800
- ^{1} French Land Register data, which excludes lakes, ponds, glaciers > 1 km^{2} (0.386 sq mi or 247 acres) and river estuaries.

Coufouleux (French pronunciation: [kufulø]; Occitan: Confolèuç) is a commune in the Tarn department in southern France.

The primary school is named after Tarn native, Jean-Louis Étienne. The community hall is named after Herve, Comte de Guerdavid, who was Mayor of Coufouleux from 1959-2001.

== Population ==
Historical population
| Year | Pop. | ±% p.a. |
|---|---|---|
| 1968 | 1,267 | — |
| 1975 | 1,384 | +1.27% |
| 1982 | 1,651 | +2.55% |
| 1990 | 1,987 | +2.34% |
| 1999 | 2,036 | +0.27% |
| 2007 | 2,137 | +0.61% |
| 2012 | 2,408 | +2.42% |
| 2017 | 2,874 | +3.60% |
| 2023 | 3,057 | +1.03% |
Source: INSEE

== Transport ==
Rabastens-Couffouleux station has rail connections to Toulouse, Albi and Rodez.

== See also ==
- Communes of the Tarn department
