= Gaillac =

- Commune
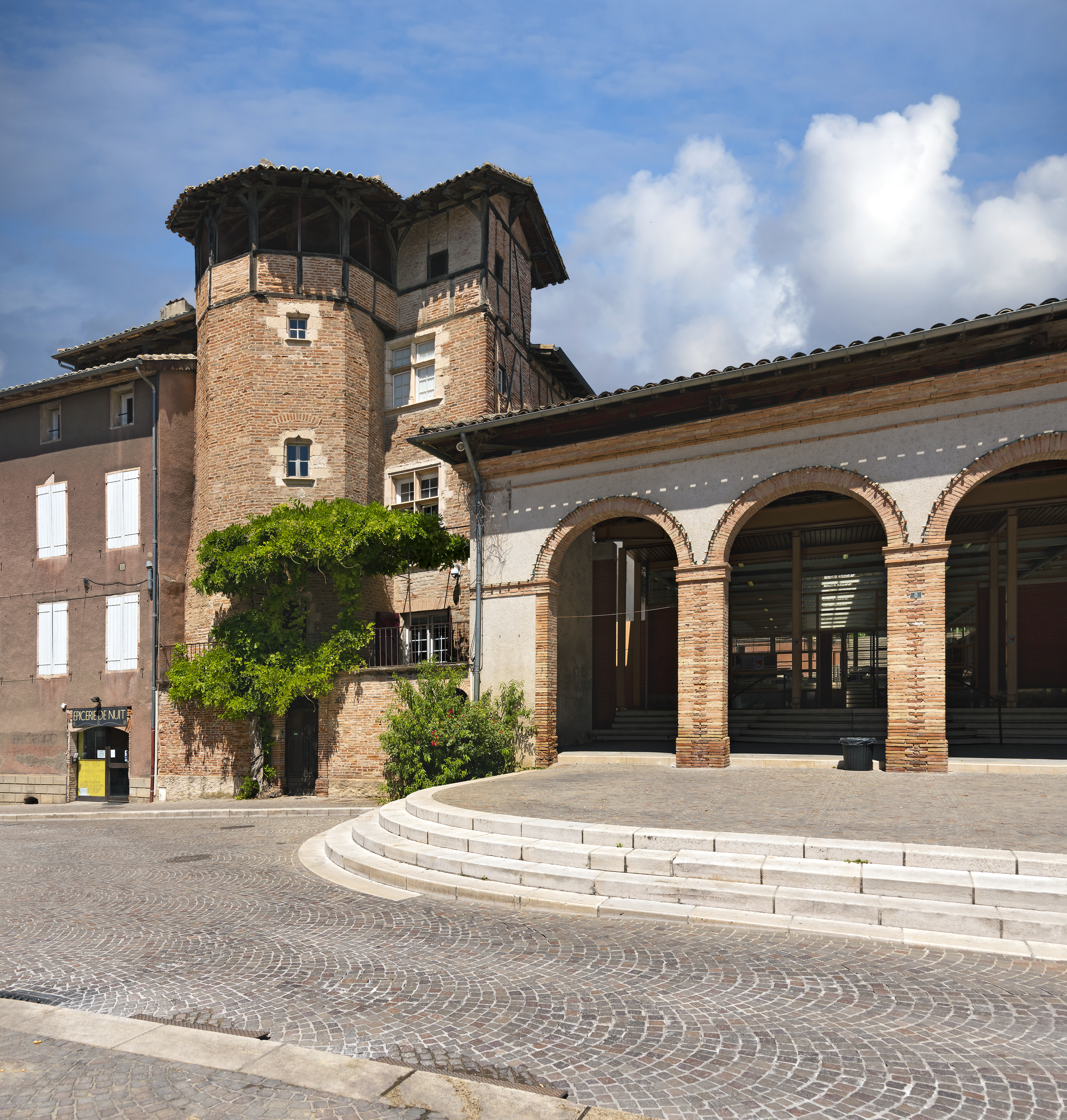
- The Place du Griffoul, in Gaillac

- Coat of arms
- Location of Gaillac
- Location within France Location within Occitanie
- Coordinates: 43°54′05″N 1°53′57″E
- Country: France
- Region: Occitania
- Department: Tarn
- Arrondissement: Albi
- Canton: Gaillac
- Intercommunality: CA Gaillac-Graulhet

Government
  - Mayor (2020–2026): Martine Souquet
- Area^{1}: 50.93 km^{2} (19.66 sq mi)
- Elevation: 140 m (460 ft)
- Highest elevation: 288 m (945 ft)
- Lowest elevation: 105 m (344 ft)
- Population (2023): 16,162
  - Density: 317.3/km^{2} (821.9/sq mi)
- Time zone: UTC+01:00 (CET)
  - Summer (DST): UTC+02:00 (CEST)
- INSEE/Postal code: 81099 /81600
- ^{1} French Land Register data, which excludes lakes, ponds, glaciers > 1 km^{2} (0.386 sq mi or 247 acres) and river estuaries.

Gaillac (French pronunciation: [ɡajak]; Occitan: Galhac) is a commune in the Tarn department in southern France. It had a population of 16,162 inhabitants in 2023. Its inhabitants are called Gaillacois in French.

== Geography ==
Gaillac is a town situated between Toulouse, Albi and Montauban. It has gained much recognition due to the wines that bear the town's name. The river Tarn runs along the border of the town by the south, east and west. It lies 50 km north-east of Toulouse. It is a market town and is the commercial centre of the north-west of Tarn.

The local wine of Gaillac, first made almost two thousand years ago, is of two official appellations (AOC). The terroir is made up of clay, limestone, sand and silex soils. Gaillac receives more sunshine than Bordeaux and is graced by a cool maritime climate. Duras is the name both of the grape that is native to this area and of an AOC and town just northwest of the two "Gaillac" designations.

== History ==
The town was founded in the second century CE by Gauls who created a river port whence they exported their wine into Gallia Narbonensis. When Aquitania was conquered by Rome, Gaillac gained prosperity with its wine. However, the barbarian invasions of the fifth century annihilated the town and left nothing behind.

Only when the monks of the Abbey of Saint-Michel (constructed in the tenth century and rebuilt in 1271) gained viticultural privileges from the Bishop of Albi, in 972, did the population stabilize and Gaillac begin to become a town again. The local wines were at first sent to Bordeaux, whence they were exported to England. In 1524 the abbey was secularized, but the title of the abbey was retained.

During the French wars of religion, most Gaillacois refused to change their religion and remained Roman Catholic; these were expelled from the town by Protestants and took refuge at Castelnau-de-Montmiral. After the St. Bartholomew's Day massacre on 24 August 1572, in Paris, the Gaillacois massacred 74 of the 90 Huguenots in the town. The abbey was again rebuilt, between 1572 and 1620. In the seventeenth century, the Château de Foucaud was erected.

It was to the town of Gaillac that Louis-Philippe I addressed the words:

Nous chercherons à nous tenir dans un juste milieu, également éloigné des excès du pouvoir populaire et des abus du pouvoir royal.

Which may be translated, "We seek to keep ourselves in a proper balance, equally distant from the excesses of popular power and from the abuses of royal power." This sentence would define the July Monarchy.

== Population ==
Historical population
Year	Pop.	±% p.a.
1968	10,315	—
1975	10,573	+0.35%
1982	10,389	−0.25%
1990	10,378	−0.01%
1999	11,073	+0.72%
2007	12,939	+1.97%
2012	13,820	+1.33%
2017	15,294	+2.05%
2023	16,162	+0.92%
Source: INSEE

== Administration ==
The mayors of the town have been:

- Henri Yrissou 1956-1977
- André Saux 1977-1983
- Jacques Dary 1983-1995
- Charles Pistre 1995-2005
- Michèle Rieux 2005–present

== Transport ==
Gaillac station has rail connections to Toulouse, Aurillac, Albi and Rodez. Tessonnières station is on the line to Albi.

== Sport ==
- UA Gaillac - Local rugby team.

== Notable people ==
- Joseph Castagné - Ethnographer and expert on Central Asia.
- Fernande Decruck - composer

== See also ==
- Gaillac AOC
- Communes of the Tarn department
- Tourism in Tarn
