= Malause station =

Railway station in Malause, France

Coordinates: 44°05′17″N 0°58′18″E

Malause
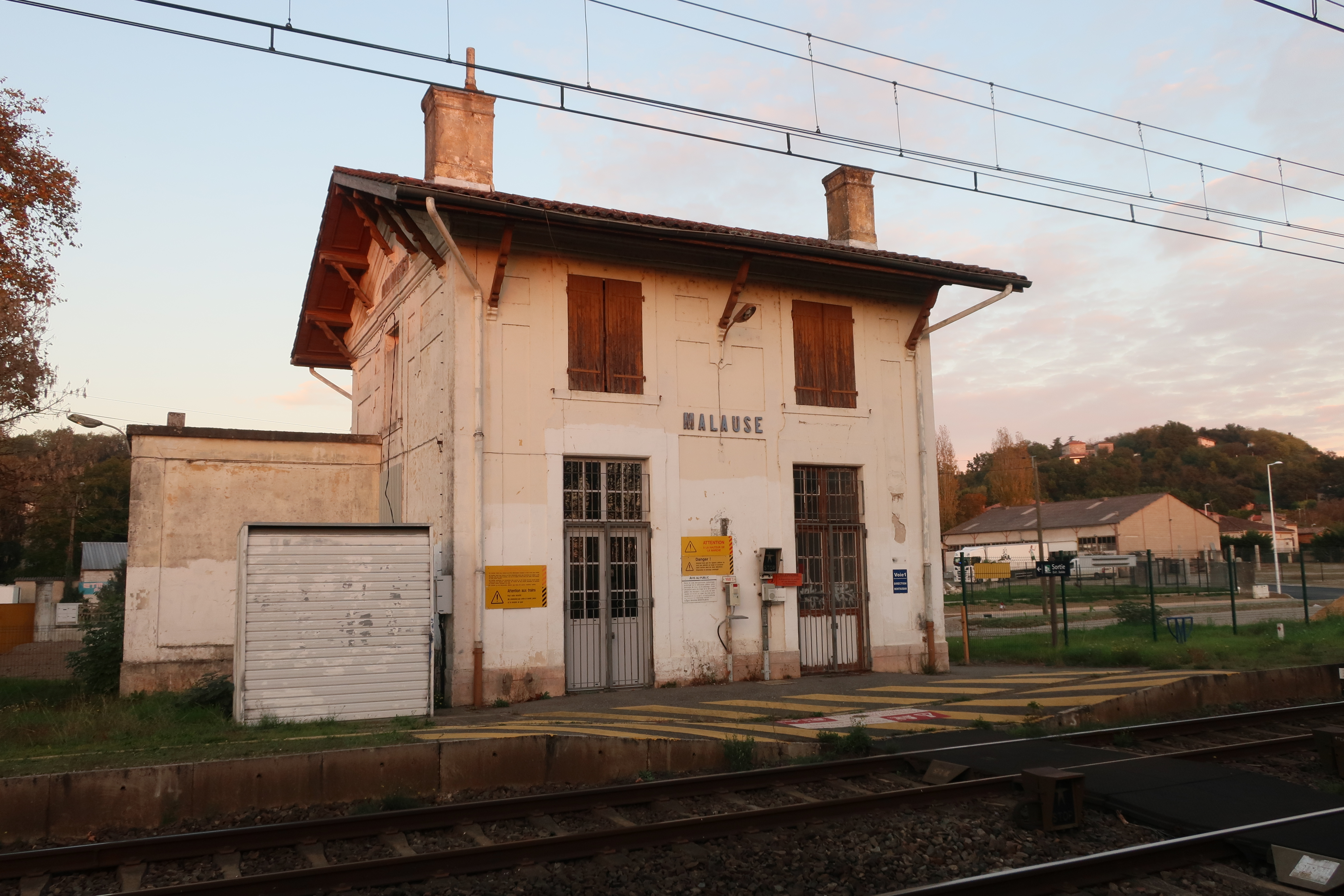
- Th railway station building in Malause.

General information
- Location: Malause, Tarn-et-Garonne, Occitanie; France
- Line: Bordeaux–Sète railway
- Platforms: 3
- Tracks: 3

Other information
- Station code: 87611871

History
- Closed: 2017
Location

Malause is a former railway station in Malause, Occitanie, France. The station is on the Bordeaux–Sète railway. The station was served by TER (local) services operated by SNCF, between Agen and Toulouse. Train service was suspended in 2017.
