= Gignac, Lot =

Gignac
- Commune
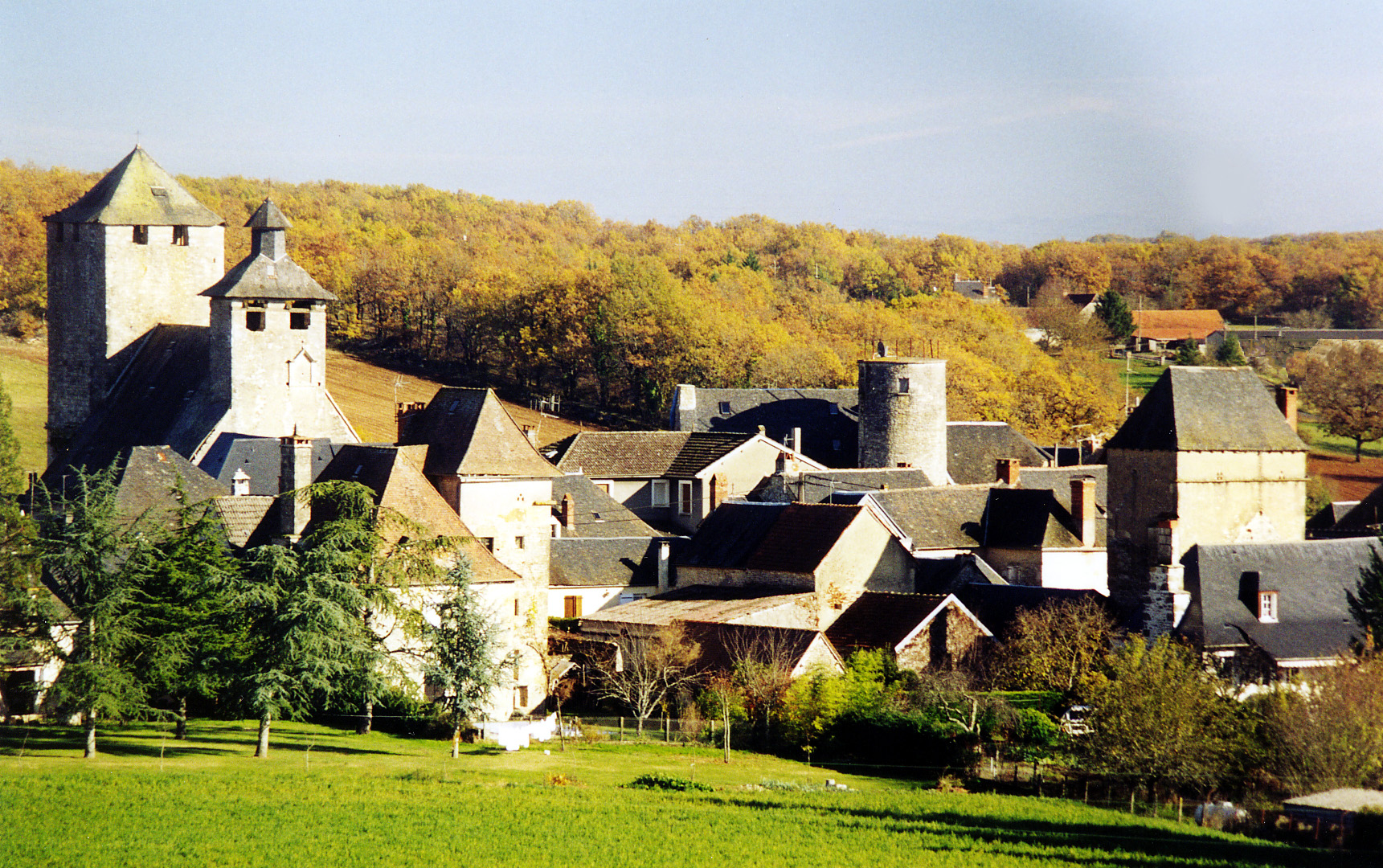
- A general view of Gignac
- Location of Gignac
- Location within France Location within Occitanie
- Coordinates: 45°00′21″N 1°27′30″E
- Country: France
- Region: Occitania
- Department: Lot
- Arrondissement: Gourdon
- Canton: Souillac
- Intercommunality: Causses et Vallée de la Dordogne

Government
  - Mayor (2020–2026): Solange Ourcival
- Area^{1}: 40.66 km^{2} (15.70 sq mi)
- Elevation: 292 m (958 ft)
- Highest elevation: 356 m (1,168 ft)
- Lowest elevation: 153 m (502 ft)
- Population (2023): 691
  - Density: 17.0/km^{2} (44.0/sq mi)
- Time zone: UTC+01:00 (CET)
  - Summer (DST): UTC+02:00 (CEST)
- INSEE/Postal code: 46118 /46600
- ^{1} French Land Register data, which excludes lakes, ponds, glaciers > 1 km^{2} (0.386 sq mi or 247 acres) and river estuaries.

Gignac (French pronunciation: [ʒiɲak]; Occitan: Ginhac) is a commune in the Lot department in south-western France. Gignac-Cressensac station has rail connections to Brive-la-Gaillarde, Cahors and Toulouse.

Gignac is a French commune located in the north of the Lot department in the Occitanie region. It is also in the causse of Martel, a natural region constituting the northernmost of the four causses of Quercy, between Limousin, valleys of the Tourmente and the Dordogne.

Exposed to an altered oceanic climate, no permanent watercourses are listed in the municipality. It is included in the Dordogne basin.

Gignac is a rural municipality with 683 inhabitants in 2022, after experiencing a population peak of 1,897 inhabitants in 1886. It is part of the area of attraction of Brive-la-Gaillarde. Its inhabitants are called Gignacois or Gignacoises.

== Location ==
Located at the limits of three departments (Lot, Corrèze and Dordogne) and two regions (Nouvelle-Aquitaine and Occitanie), the municipality of Gignac has installed a terminal, called "pierre des 3 Régions", at the junction point of the three Regions to replace an ancient terminal called "Pierre des Trois Évêques" which existed at the time of the creation of the first bishoprics, and which was located in 1317 at the junction point of the bishoprics of Cahors, Tulle and Sarlat. These last two dioceses were created in 1317 by the Cadurcian Pope John XXII. On the map of Canon Jean Tarde (1561-1636) appears the toponym "Le puy des 3 evesques".

The municipality's logo presents the original geographical location of the municipality at the junction point of Limousin (green), Périgord black (brown) and Quercy (yellow).

Characterized by quality architecture (use of limestone and slate), the municipality owes its architectural richness to the truffle, abundant in the nineteenth century and until 1950.

The municipality, crossed by the 45th parallel, is located on the Cause of Martel. Its area of 4,066 hectares makes it one of the largest municipalities in the Lot department. About twenty hamlets are distributed over the municipal territory. From a historical point of view, the most interesting hamlet is that of La Blénie. It was a possession of the monks of the abbey of Aubazine (Corrèze). The cartular of the abbey of Aubazine tells us that the inhabitants of the castle of Tersac are the Blain and that they have vineyards. These Blain gave their name to a part of their domain now located on the territory of the municipality of Gignac. This is the Blaeneg, also written Blaini (1163-1164). In 1241, the inquisitor Pierre Cellan made an Inquisition tour in Quercy. He judges in Gourdon 237 people warned of heresy, among which is Arsen (de La) Blénie. During the wars of Religion, in 1569, Gignac was sached. Baudran's Aubazine barn and its church are destroyed. The Blénie, a member of Baudran, is devastated. The religious unrest of 1795-1796 was accompanied by the desecration of trees of Liberty. The Freedom Tree was planted in the villages, but also in the hamlets, as in La Blénie. The inhabitants of La Blénie had planted a tree that Joseph Veges, a sharecropper, cut down on May 11, 1796. Arrested, charged, questioned, he declares that the storm, at the beginning of January, knocked down half of the tree, the other half threatened to collapse, so he tore it off, but he offers to plant another tree. On May 20, 1796, Veges was released.

== Personalities related to the municipality ==
Saint Didier, bishop of Auxerre, who died around 623, was Quercynois through his mother Necteria. In his will, he bequeathed his villa de Gignac (reading hypothesis) to the bishop of Cahors.

Jean-Joseph Cérou, doctor of medicine in Toulouse, capitoul of the city of Toulouse in 1770, then judge of the castle of Gignac. Pierre Cérou's older brother. He died in Gignac on October 13, 1778 at the age of 73. He will be buried in the church of Gignac, at his request: "I want to be buried in the church of Gignac and in the tombs of my ancestors and that my funeral honors be done quite simply," he wrote in his will. His nephew, Dominique Cérou, will be the first mayor of Gignac in 1790.

Pierre Cérou, playwright, tutor of the Infanta of Spain Marie-Isabelle de Bourbon-Parme, granddaughter of Louis XV. Younger brother of Jean-Joseph Cérou.

David Bélonie, member of the Bonnet Gang.

Fernando Costa, sculptural artist sculptor-welder.

== See also ==
- Communes of the Lot department

== Gallery ==
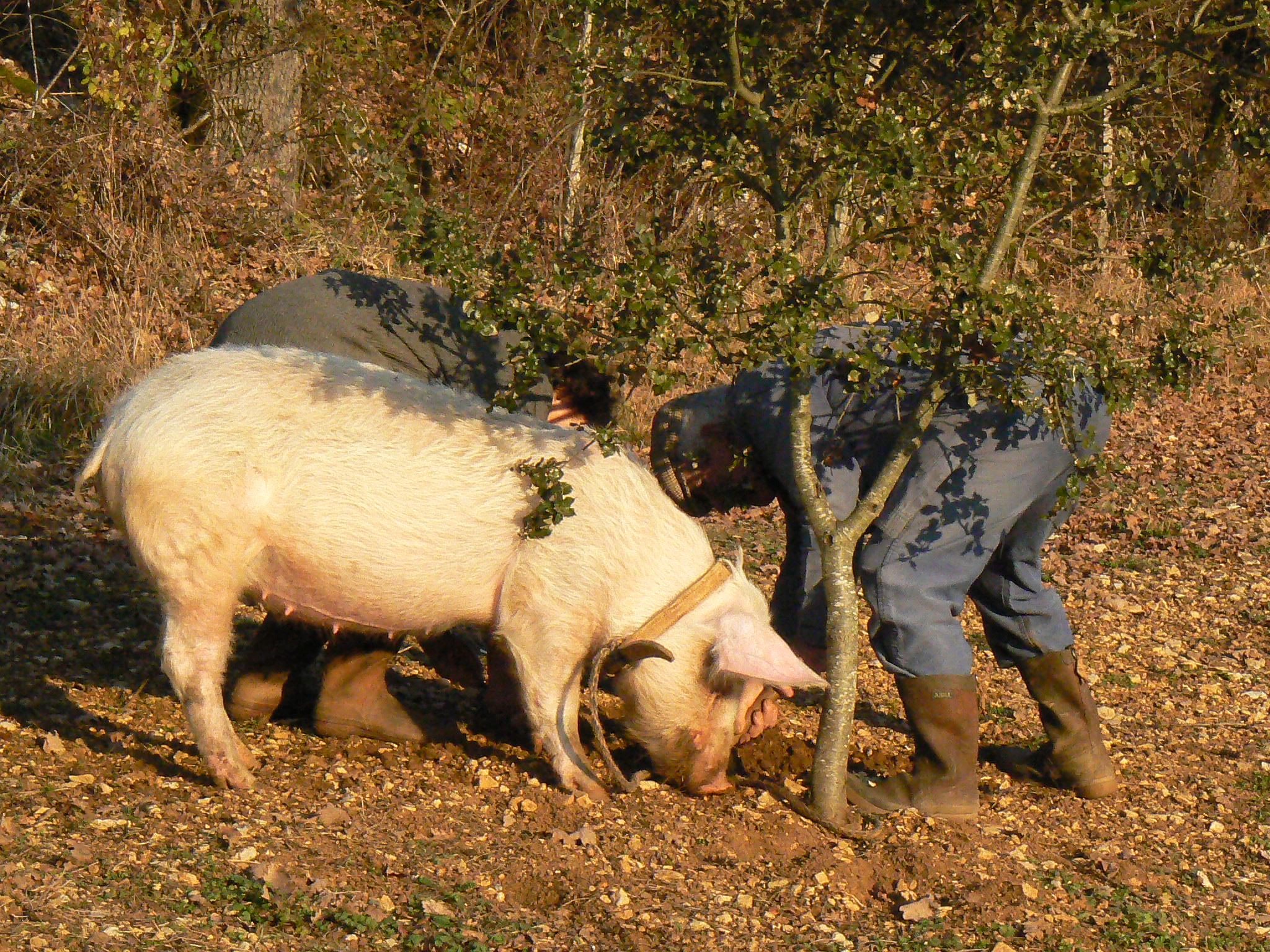
Trained pig searching for truffles in Gignac
