= Henri Yrissou =

French politician

- Born: 15 May 1909; Nîmes, Gard, France
- Died: 21 June 2009 (aged 100); Paris, France
- Occupation: Politician
- Political party: National Centre of Independents and Peasants

Henri Yrissou (May 15, 1909 - June 21, 2009) was a French World War II veteran and politician. He served as a member of the National Assembly and as the mayor of Gaillac.

== Early life ==
Henri Yrissou was born in Nîmes, France on May 15, 1909. During World War II, he joined the French Resistance and consequently received the Resistance Medal; he also received the Croix de Guerre and became a Commander of the Legion of Honour. Additionally, he became a Commander of the Veterans of Foreign Wars.

== Career ==
Yrissou was Public Works and Foreign Affairs Minister Antoine Pinay's chief of staff from 1950 to 1955. He then served as a member of the National Assembly from November 30, 1958 to October 9, 1962, representing Tarn. He also served as the mayor of Gaillac from 1959 to 1977. As mayor, he oversaw the construction of the sewage system and lured a plastics factory to create jobs.

== Death ==
Yrissou died on June 21, 2009.
