= Grisolles station =

Railway station in Grisolles, France

Grisolles
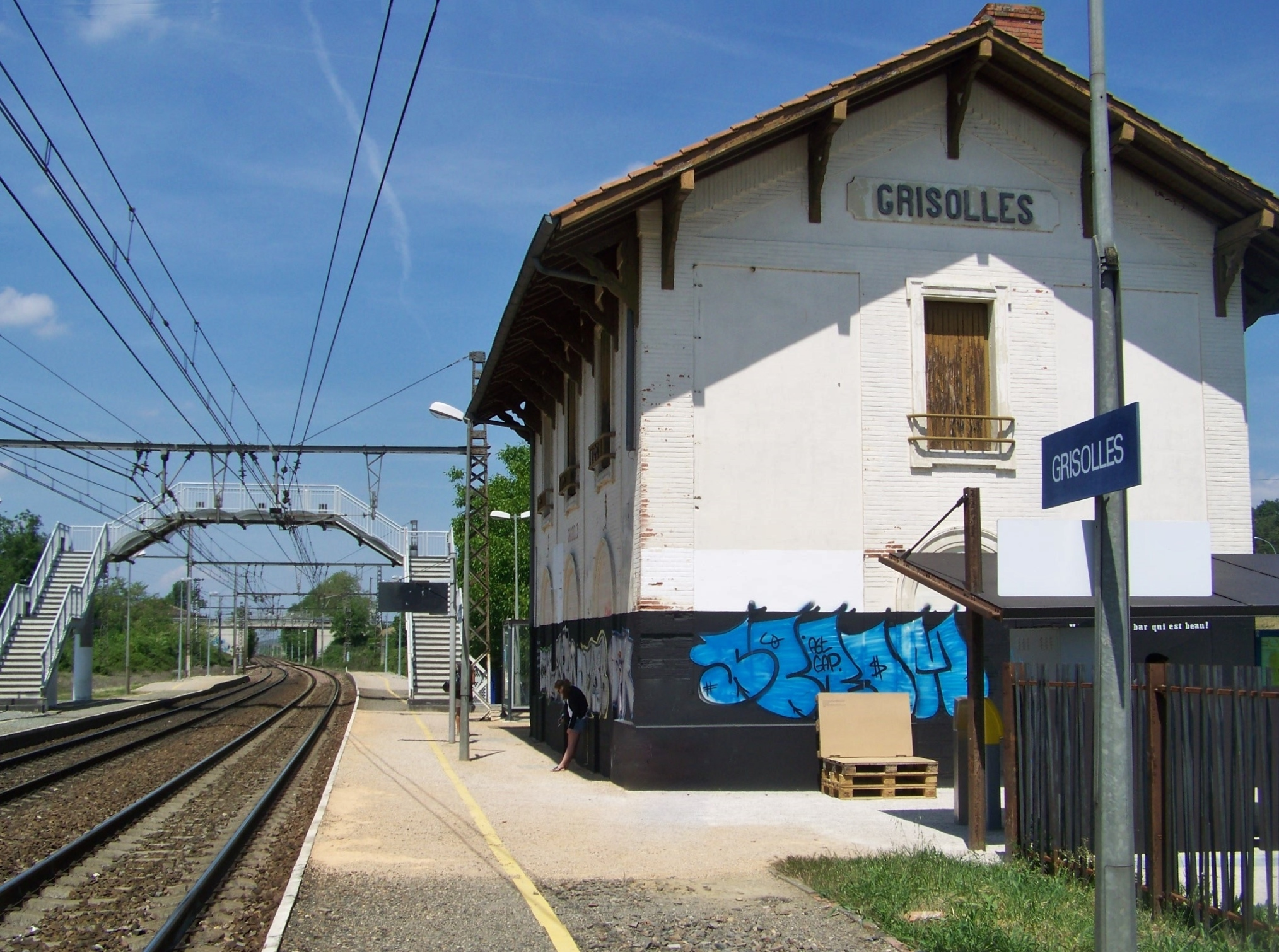
- Grisolles station

General information
- Location: Grisolles, Tarn-et-Garonne; Occitanie, France
- Coordinates: 43°49′37″N 1°18′05″E
- Line: Bordeaux–Sète railway
- Platforms: 2
- Tracks: 2

Other information
- Station code: 87611673

Services
| Preceding station | TER Occitanie | Following station |
|---|---|---|
| Dieupentale towards Brive-la-Gaillarde | 19 | Castelnau-d'Estrétefonds towards Toulouse |
Location

Grisolles is a railway station in Grisolles, Occitanie, France. The station is on the Bordeaux–Sète railway. The station is served by TER (local) services operated by SNCF.

== Train services ==
The following services currently call at Grisolles:

- local service (TER Occitanie) Brive-la-Gaillarde–Cahors–Montauban–Toulouse
- local service (TER Occitanie) Montauban–Toulouse
