= Aucamville, Haute-Garonne =

Aucamville
- Commune
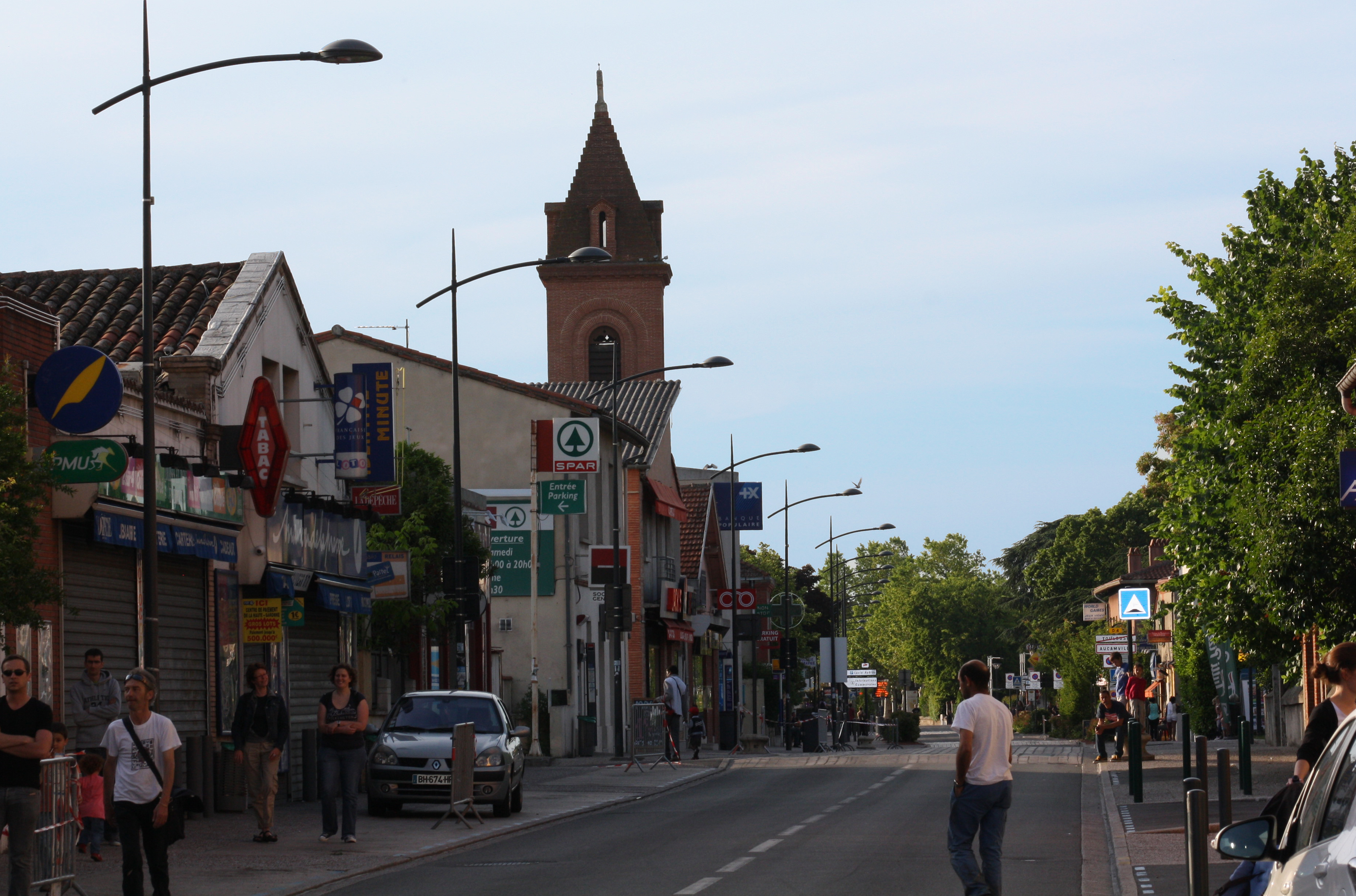
- The centre of Aucamville

- Coat of arms
- Location of Aucamville
- Location within France Location within Occitanie
- Coordinates: 43°40′11″N 1°25′52″E
- Country: France
- Region: Occitania
- Department: Haute-Garonne
- Arrondissement: Toulouse
- Canton: Castelginest
- Intercommunality: Toulouse Métropole

Government
  - Mayor (2020–2026): Gérard André
- Area^{1}: 3.96 km^{2} (1.53 sq mi)
- Elevation: 128 m (420 ft)
- Highest elevation: 135 m (443 ft)
- Lowest elevation: 125 m (410 ft)
- Population (2023): 9,623
  - Density: 2,430/km^{2} (6,290/sq mi)
- Time zone: UTC+01:00 (CET)
  - Summer (DST): UTC+02:00 (CEST)
- INSEE/Postal code: 31022 /31140
- ^{1} French Land Register data, which excludes lakes, ponds, glaciers > 1 km^{2} (0.386 sq mi or 247 acres) and river estuaries.

Aucamville (French pronunciation: [okɑ̃vil]; Occitan: Aucamvila) is a commune in the Haute-Garonne department in southwestern France.

== Population ==
Historical population
Year	Pop.	±% p.a.
1968	2,401	—
1975	2,541	+0.81%
1982	2,826	+1.53%
1990	3,807	+3.79%
1999	5,533	+4.24%
2007	7,707	+4.23%
2012	8,119	+1.05%
2017	8,408	+0.70%
2023	9,623	+2.28%
Source: INSEE

== International relations ==
Aucamville is twinned with Fossalta di Portogruaro in Italy since 1990.

== See also ==
- Communes of the Haute-Garonne department
