= Gourdon station =

Railway station in Gourdon, France

Coordinates: 44°44′29″N 1°23′21″E

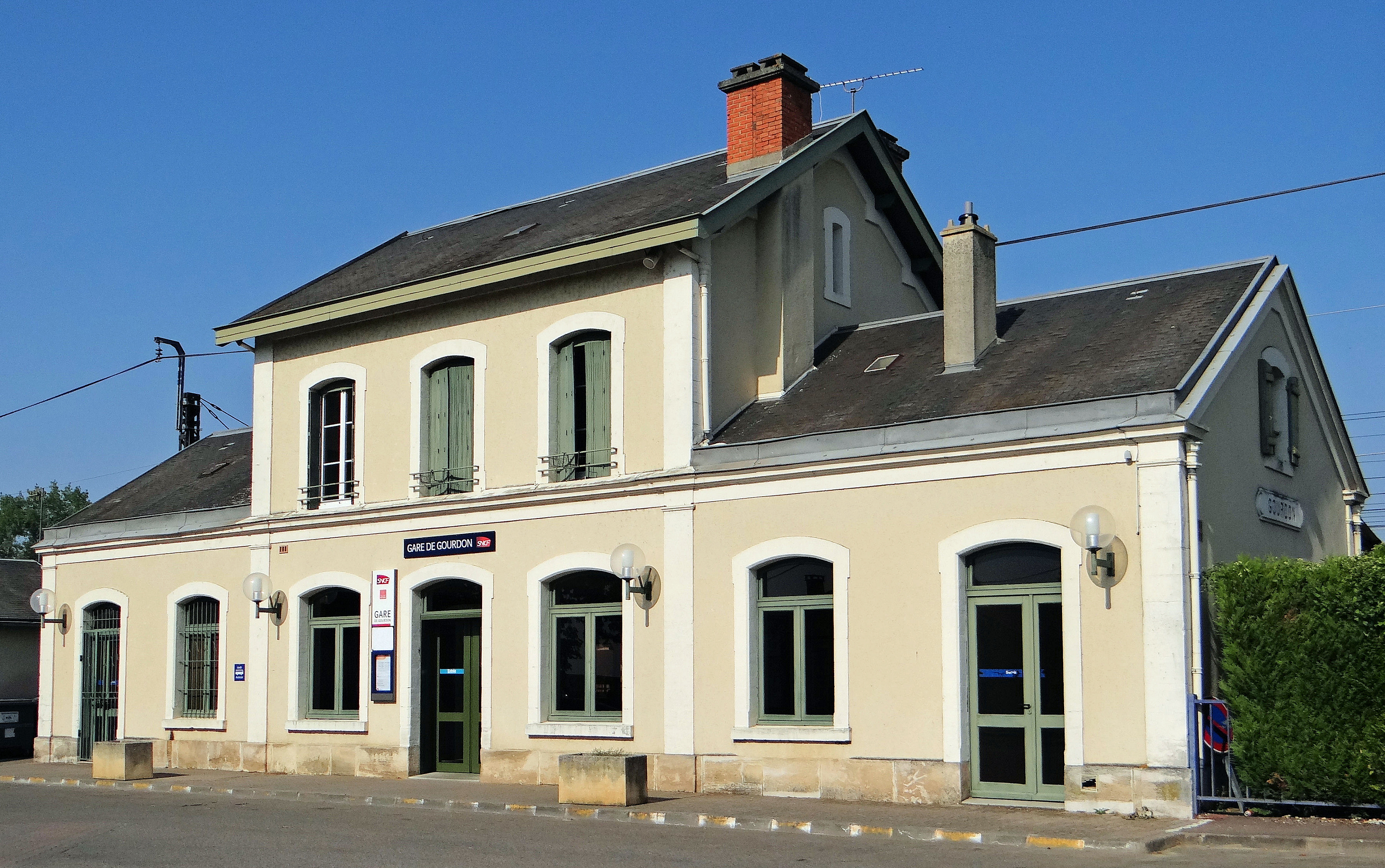
Gourdon station

Gourdon is a railway station in Gourdon, Occitanie, France. The station is on the Orléans–Montauban railway line. The station is served by Corail Lunéa (night train), Téoz (Intercity) and TER (local) services operated by SNCF.

== Train services ==
The following services call at Gourdon:

- intercity services (Intercités) Paris–Vierzon–Limoges–Toulouse
- night services (Intercités de nuit) Paris–Orléans–Souillac–Toulouse
- local service (TER Occitanie) Brive-la-Gaillarde–Cahors–Montauban–Toulouse

Preceding station	SNCF	Following station
Souillac towards Paris-Austerlitz	Intercités	Cahors towards Toulouse
Souillac towards Paris-Austerlitz	Intercités (night)	Cahors towards Toulouse
Preceding station	TER Occitanie	Following station
Souillac towards Brive-la-Gaillarde	19	Dégagnac towards Toulouse
