= Souillac station =

Railway station in Souillac, France

Coordinates: 44°54′06″N 1°27′58″E

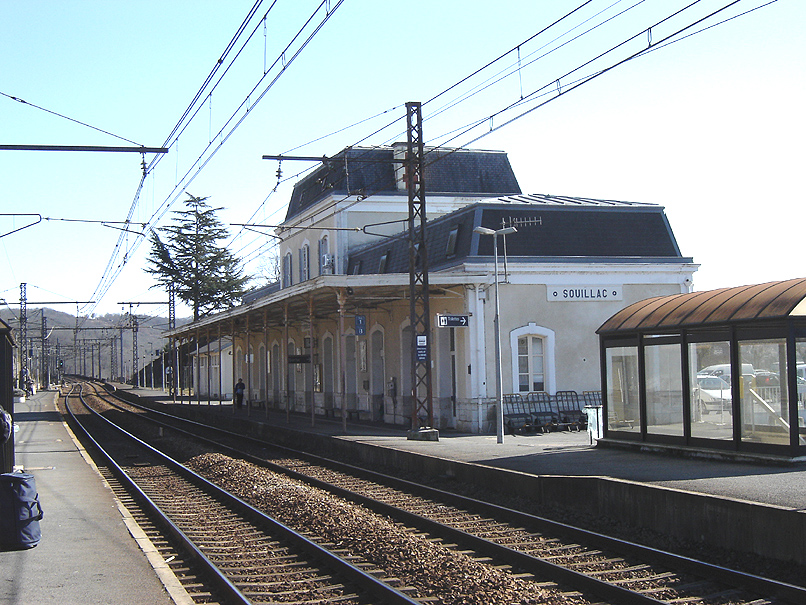
Souillac station

Souillac is a railway station in Souillac, Occitanie, France. The station opened in 1889 and is on the Orléans–Montauban railway line. The station is served by Intercités de nuit (night train), Téoz (Intercity) and TER (local) services.

== Train services ==
The following services currently call at Souillac:

- intercity services (Intercités) Paris–Vierzon–Limoges–Toulouse
- night services (Intercités de nuit) Paris–Orléans–Souillac–Toulouse
- local service (TER Occitanie) Brive-la-Gaillarde–Cahors–Montauban–Toulouse

Preceding station	SNCF	Following station
Brive-la-Gaillarde towards Paris-Austerlitz	Intercités	Gourdon towards Toulouse
Les Aubrais towards Paris-Austerlitz	Intercités (night)	Gourdon towards Toulouse
Preceding station	TER Occitanie	Following station
Gignac-Cressensac towards Brive-la-Gaillarde	19	Gourdon towards Toulouse
