= Lisle-sur-Tarn station =

Railway station in Lisle-sur-Tarn, France

Coordinates: 43°51′22″N 1°48′26″E

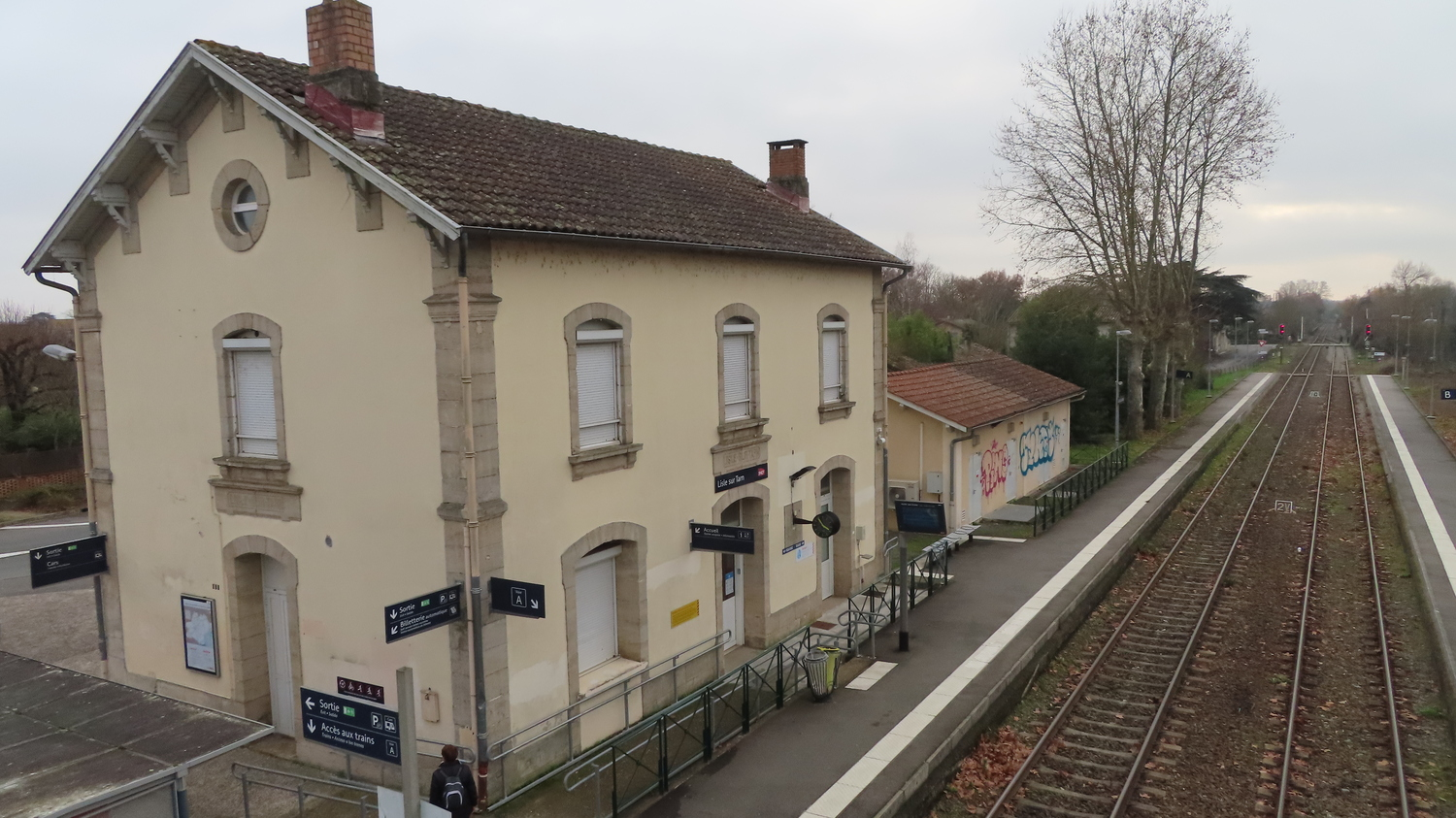

Lisle-sur-Tarn is a railway station in Lisle-sur-Tarn, Occitanie, which is the southernmost administrative region of France. It is on the Brive–Toulouse (via Capdenac) railway line. The station is served by TER (local) services operated by SNCF.

== Train services ==
The following services currently call at Lisle-sur-Tarn:

- local service (TER Occitanie) Toulouse–Albi–Rodez
- local service (TER Occitanie) Toulouse–Figeac–Aurillac

Preceding station	TER Occitanie	Following station
Rabastens-Couffouleux towards Toulouse	2	Gaillac towards Rodez
Saint-Sulpice towards Toulouse	3	Gaillac towards Aurillac
