= Lestelle-de-Saint-Martory =

- Commune
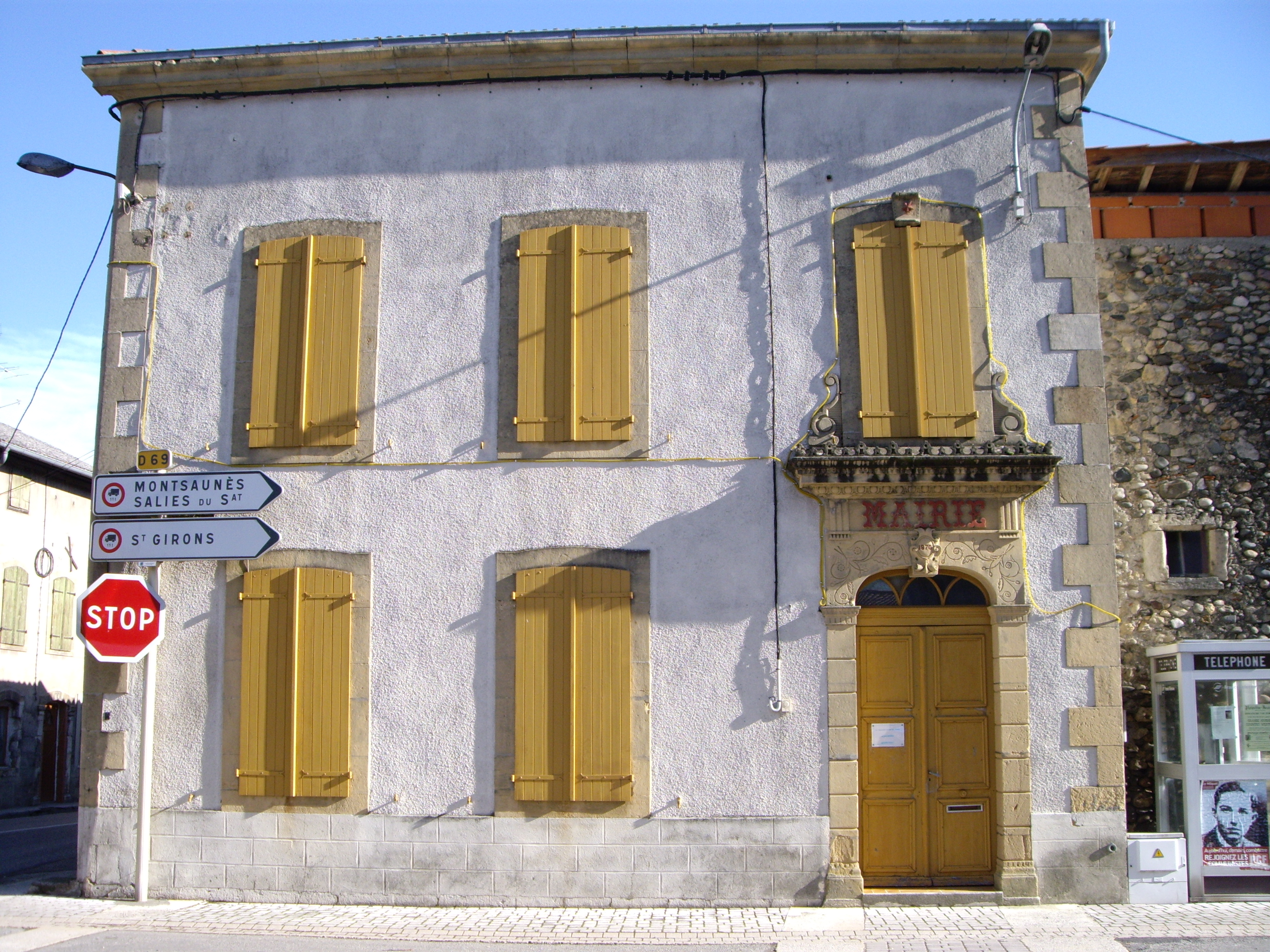
- Town hall

- Coat of arms
- Location of Lestelle-de-Saint-Martory
- Location within France Location within Occitanie
- Coordinates: 43°07′18″N 0°54′43″E
- Country: France
- Region: Occitania
- Department: Haute-Garonne
- Arrondissement: Saint-Gaudens
- Canton: Bagnères-de-Luchon
- Intercommunality: Cagire Garonne Salat

Government
  - Mayor (2020–2026): Alain Lasserre
- Area^{1}: 9.4 km^{2} (3.6 sq mi)
- Elevation: 297 m (974 ft)
- Highest elevation: 410 m (1,350 ft)
- Lowest elevation: 284 m (932 ft)
- Population (2023): 430
  - Density: 46/km^{2} (120/sq mi)
- Time zone: UTC+01:00 (CET)
  - Summer (DST): UTC+02:00 (CEST)
- INSEE/Postal code: 31296 /31360
- ^{1} French Land Register data, which excludes lakes, ponds, glaciers > 1 km^{2} (0.386 sq mi or 247 acres) and river estuaries.

Lestelle-de-Saint-Martory (French pronunciation: [lɛstɛl də sɛ̃ maʁtɔʁi]; Occitan: Era Estela de Sent Martòri) is a commune in the Haute-Garonne department in southwestern France.

== Population ==
Historical population
Year	Pop.	±% p.a.
1968	417	—
1975	394	−0.81%
1982	388	−0.22%
1990	356	−1.07%
1999	378	+0.67%
2007	383	+0.16%
2012	459	+3.69%
2017	440	−0.84%
2023	430	−0.38%
Source: INSEE

== See also ==
- Communes of the Haute-Garonne department
