= Rabastens–Couffouleux station =

Railway station in Coufouleux, France

Coordinates: 43°49′10″N 1°43′46″E

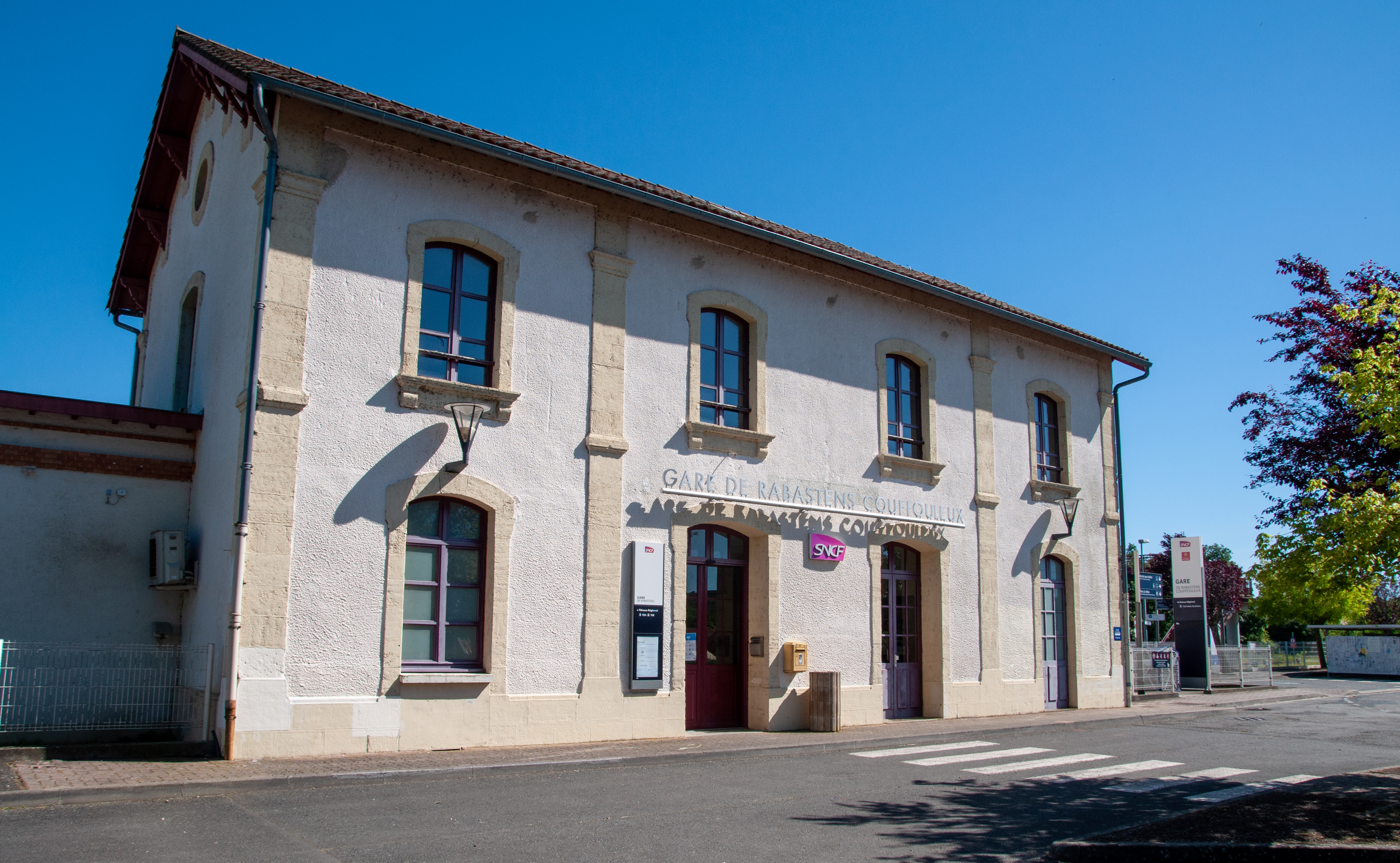
Rabastens Couffouleux station building

Rabastens-Couffouleux is a railway station in Coufouleux and across the river from Rabastens, in Occitanie administrative region of France. It is on the Brive–Toulouse (via Capdenac) railway line. The station is served by TER (local) services operated by SNCF.

== Train services ==
The following services currently call at Rabastens-Couffouleux:

- local service (TER Occitanie) Toulouse–Albi–Rodez

Preceding station	TER Occitanie	Following station
Saint-Sulpice towards Toulouse	2	Lisle-sur-Tarn towards Rodez
