= Joseph Castagné =

Joseph-Antoine Castagné (Gaillac, Tarn, November 27, 1875 - January 19, 1958, Montpellier) was a French professor at the Gymnase d'Orenbourg in Orenburg, Russia, an ethnographer, and an expert on Central Asia. He wrote extensively about Russian Turkestan.

== Publications ==
- Chants et danses populaires folkloriques de quelques peuples orientaux de l'U.R.S.S. Paris, 1956.
- Le culte des lieux saints de l'Islam au Turkestan. Paris, 1951.
- Le Problème du Turkestan chinois (sin-kiang). Paris: P. Geuthner, 1933.
- Notes sur l'Afghanistan. Paris, 1932
- "Essai de démonologie kazak-kirghize: la personnification des éléments chez les Kazak-Kirghiz." “L'Etnographie” 26:51-60, 1932.
- Ethnographie religieuse: étude sur la démonologie des Kazak-Kirghizes. Alençon: Imprimerie Laverdure, 1931
- Magie et exorcisme chez les Kazak-Kirghizes et autres peuples turks orientaux. Paris: Librairie Orientaliste Paul Geuthner, 1930.
- L'Orientalisme et l'archéologie au Turkestan russe. Paris: G. Van Ouest, 1930.
- Le mouvement d'émancipation de la femme musulmane en Orient. Paris : P. Geuthner, 1929.
- Le mouvement de latinisation dans les Républiques soviétiques musulmanes et les pays voisins. Paris: P. Geuthner, 1928.
- “Le réveil national carélien.” Paris : H. Champion, 1927.
- La latinisation de l'alphabet turk dans les Républiques turko-tatares de l'URSS. Paris: librairie orientaliste Paul Geuthner, 1927.
- Le Congrès de turcologie de Bakou (mars 1926). Paris: E. Leroux, 1926.
- "Le rôle de la chanson dans l'idéologie nationale des Pays baltes." Société d'Ethnographie de Paris. 1925/04/15 No. 11 -1925/12/15. No. 12.
- Les Musulmans et la politique des Soviets en Asie centrale; Les Indes et l'Egypte vues de Russie. Paris: E. Leroux, 1925.
- Les Basmatchis: le mouvement national des indigènes d'Asie Centrale depuis la Révolution d'octobre 1917 jusqu'en octobre 1924. Paris : Éditions E. Leroux, 1925.
- Survivances d'anciens cultes et rites en Asie central. Paris, 1923.
- Russie slave et Russie turque: les chances d'une politique islamique allemande. Paris: Leroux, 1923.
- Le Turkestan depuis la Révolution russe (1917-1921). Paris: E. Leroux, 1922.
- ‘’Notes sur la politique extérieure de l'Afghanistan depuis 1919 (missions et traités).’’ Documents annexes traduits du Persan. L. Bouvat. Paris : E. Leroux, 1921
- Les tamgas des Kirghizes (Kazaks). Paris : E. Leroux, 1921.
- ‘’Современные успѣхи спелеологіи и мои спелеологическія поѣздки по Туркестану 1913 и 1914 г.г.’’ Tashkent: : электро-типографія Я. П. Эдельмана, 1915.
- “Étude historique et comparative des statues babas des Steppes Khirghizes et de Russie en general.” Bulletins et Mémoires de la Société d'anthropologie de Paris. 1910. Volume 1. Issue 1. pp. 375-407.
- Надгробные сооружения киргизских степей. Orenburg : Tip. Turgaĭskogo Obl. Pravlenia, 1911.
- ‘’Древности Киргизской степи и Оренбургскаго края’’. Въ Оренбургѣ : типо-лит. т-ва "Каримовъ, Хусаиновъ и к-о", 1910,
- ‘’Monuments cyclopéens dans le Ferghana.” Bulletins et Mémoires de la Société d'anthropologie de Paris. 1914. Volume 5. Issue 5-1. pp. 7–10.
- Отчетъ о поѣздкѣ въ Шахрохію и мѣстность "Канка". Publication date unknown.
