= Castelnau-d'Estrétefonds =

- Commune
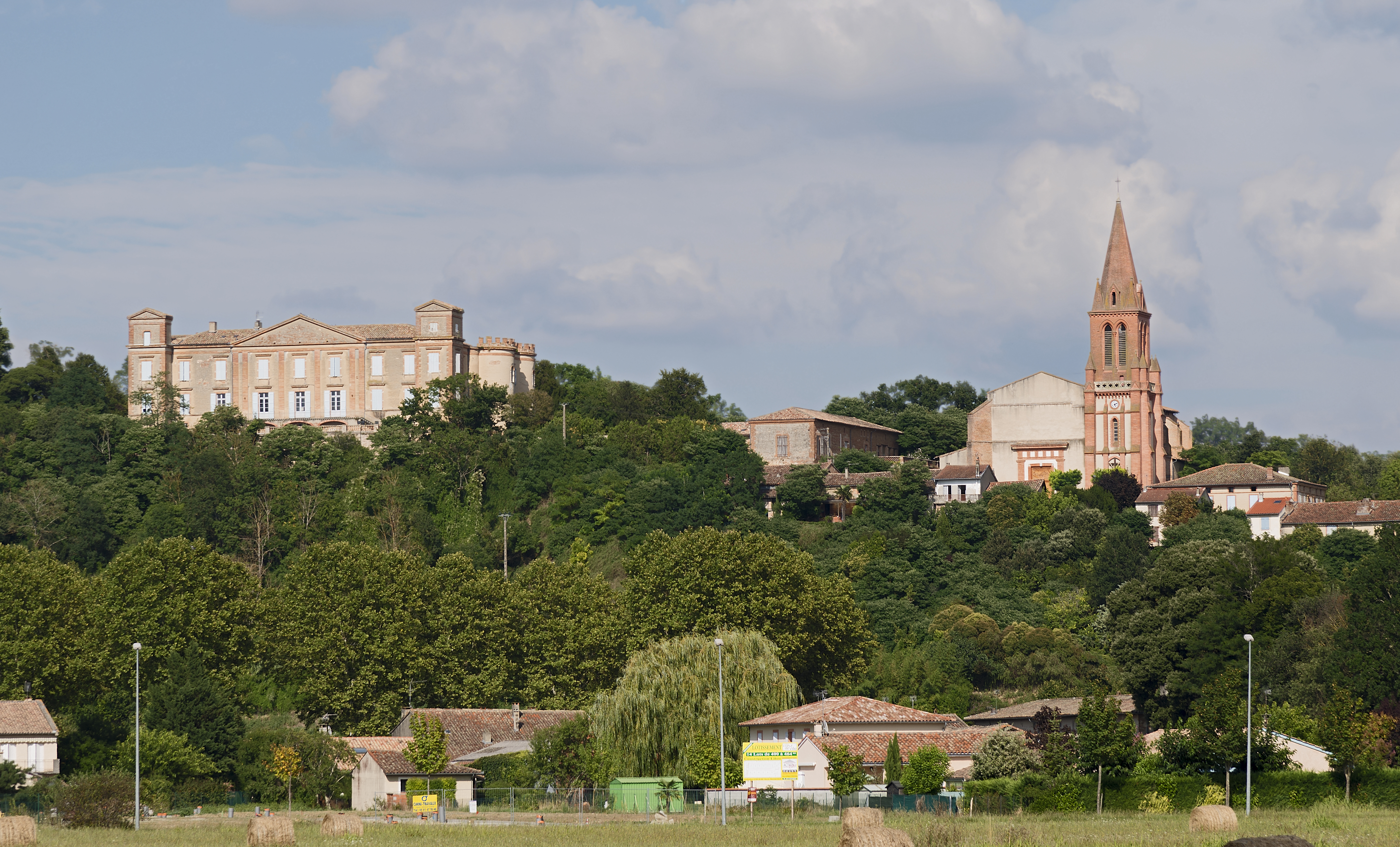
- A general view of Castelnau-d'Estrétefonds

- Coat of arms
- Location of Castelnau-d'Estrétefonds
- Location within France Location within Occitanie
- Coordinates: 43°47′00″N 1°21′33″E
- Country: France
- Region: Occitania
- Department: Haute-Garonne
- Arrondissement: Toulouse
- Canton: Villemur-sur-Tarn

Government
  - Mayor (2022–2026): Sandrine Sigal
- Area^{1}: 28.32 km^{2} (10.93 sq mi)
- Elevation: 118 m (387 ft)
- Highest elevation: 224 m (735 ft)
- Lowest elevation: 105 m (344 ft)
- Population (2023): 7,003
  - Density: 247.3/km^{2} (640.5/sq mi)
- Time zone: UTC+01:00 (CET)
  - Summer (DST): UTC+02:00 (CEST)
- INSEE/Postal code: 31118 /31620
- ^{1} French Land Register data, which excludes lakes, ponds, glaciers > 1 km^{2} (0.386 sq mi or 247 acres) and river estuaries.

Castelnau-d'Estrétefonds (French pronunciation: [kastɛlno dɛstʁetfɔ̃]; Occitan: Castèlnau d'Estretasfonts) is a commune in the Haute-Garonne department in southwestern France. It is served by Castelnau-d'Estrétefonds station on the Bordeaux-Toulouse line.

== Population ==
Historical population

Year	Pop.	±% p.a.
1936	1,107	—
1962	1,240	+0.44%
1968	1,432	+2.43%
1975	1,570	+1.32%
1982	1,853	+2.40%
1990	2,518	+3.91%

Year	Pop.	±% p.a.
1999	2,812	+1.23%
2007	4,957	+7.34%
2012	5,815	+3.24%
2017	6,334	+1.72%
2023	7,003	+1.69%

Source: EHESS and INSEE (1968-2023)

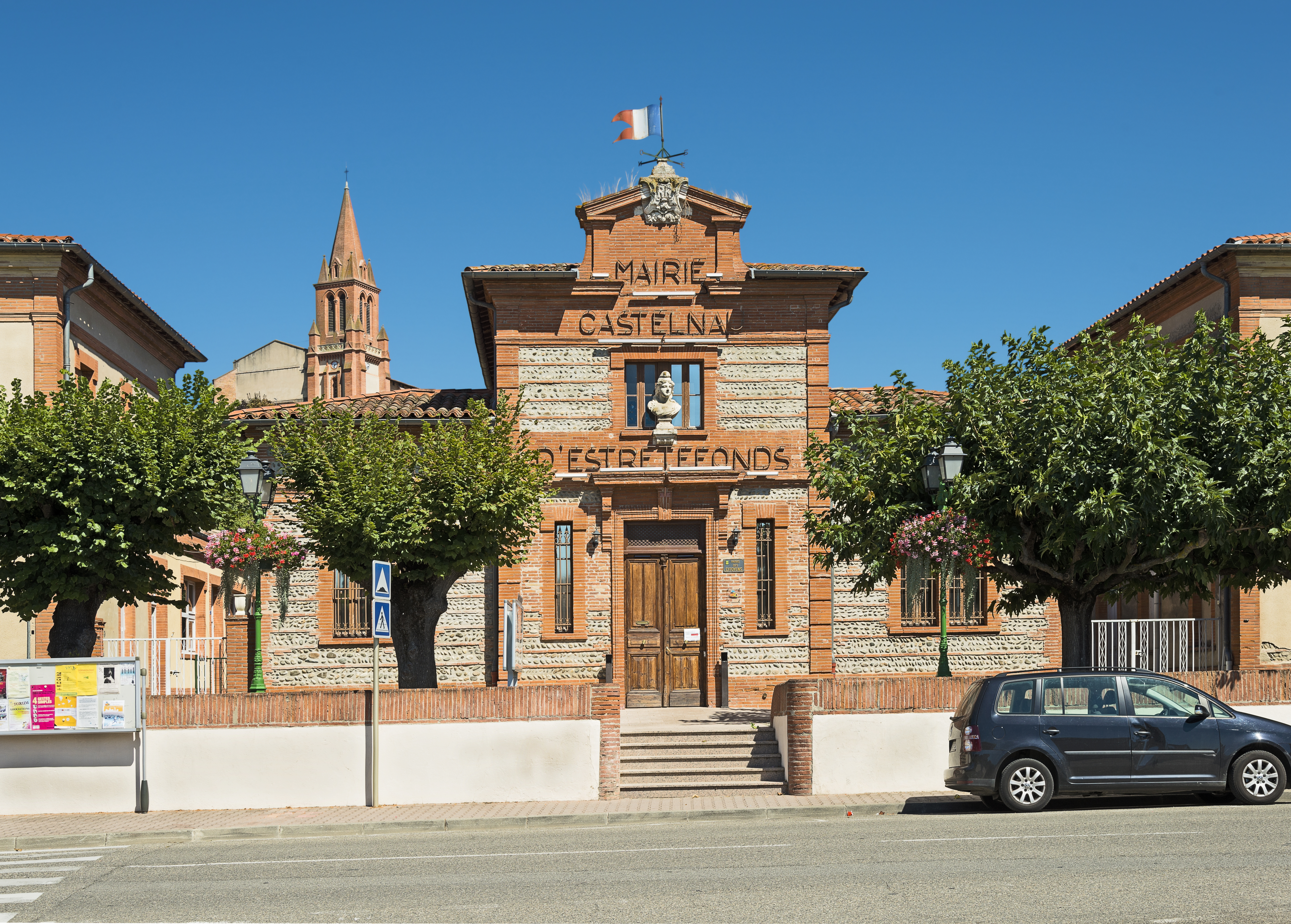
Town Hall

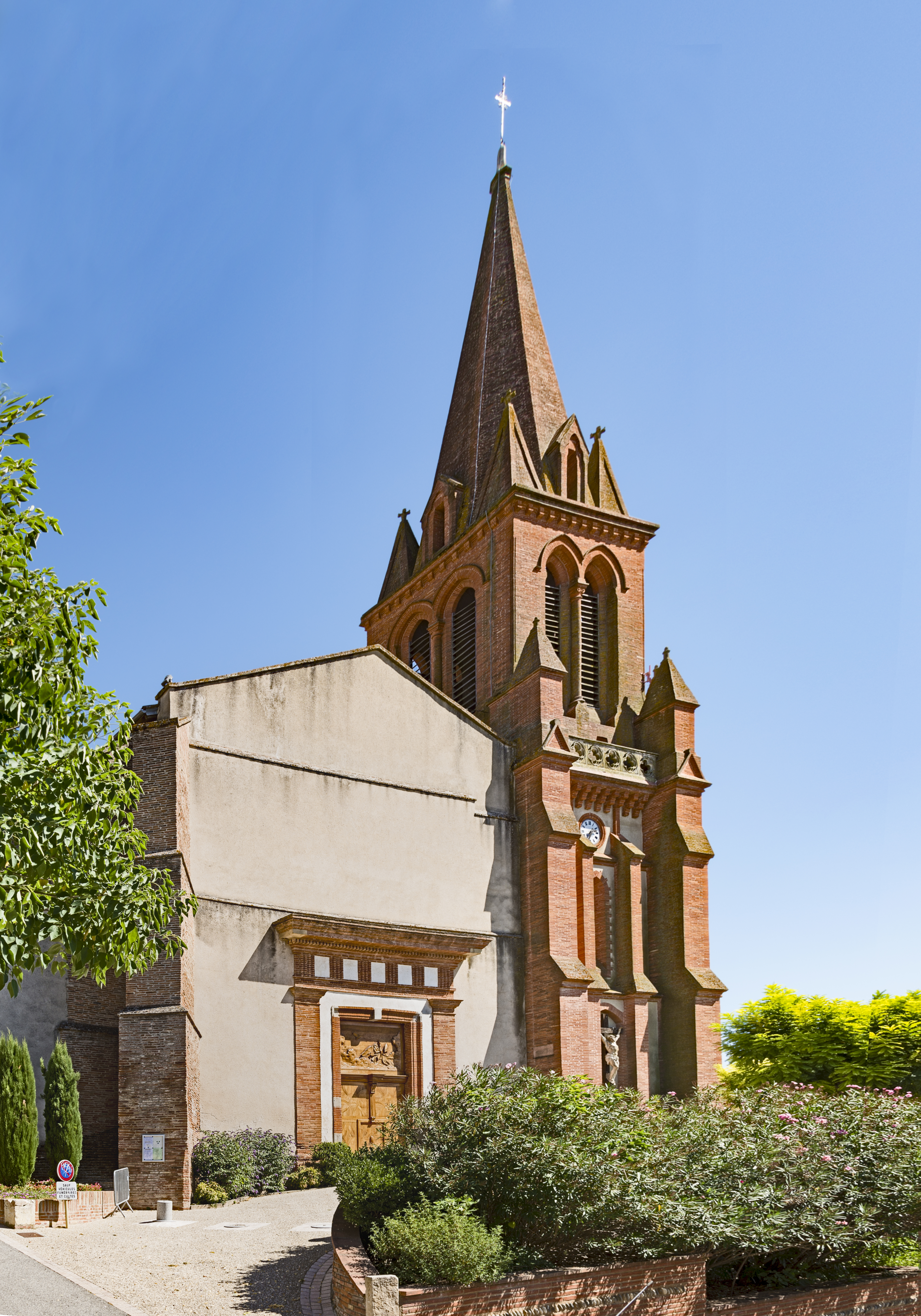
St. Martin Church

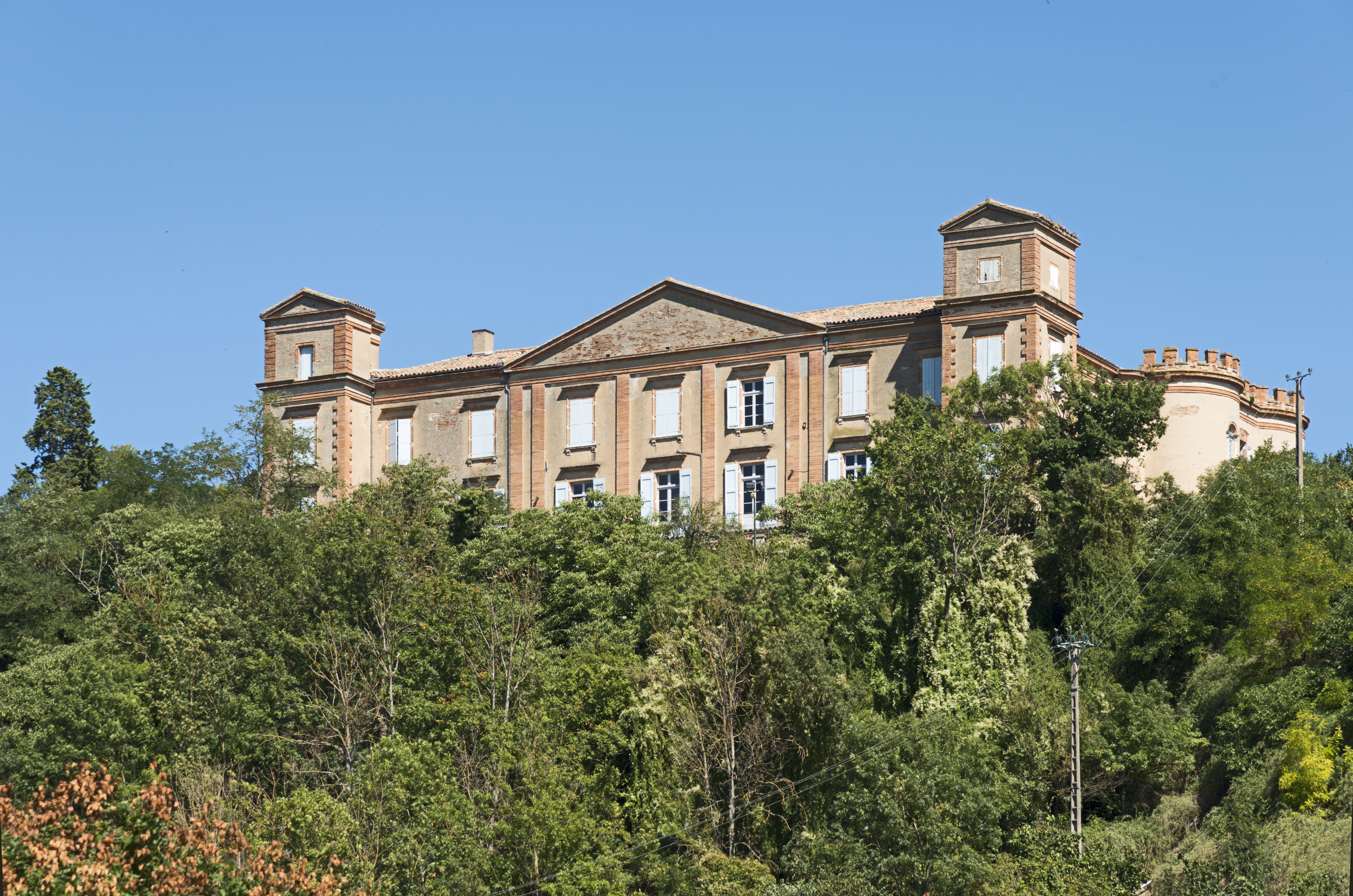
The Castel

== See also ==
- Communes of the Haute-Garonne department
