= Gignac–Cressensac station =

Railway station in Gignac, France

Coordinates: 45°00′52″N 1°28′58″E

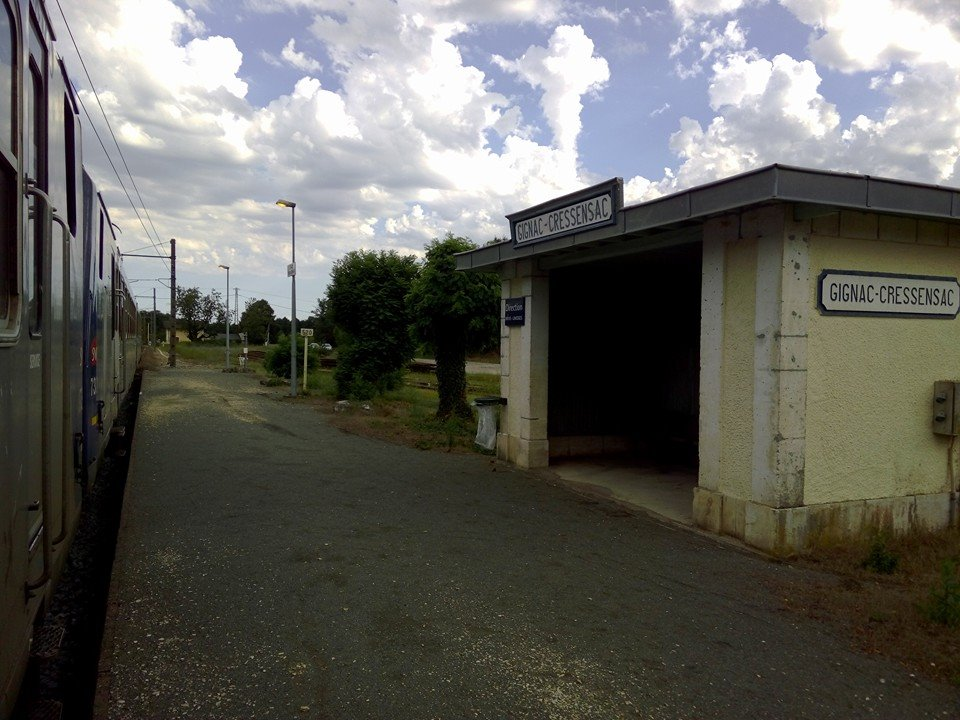
Gignac Cressensac station

Gignac-Cressensac is a railway station between Gignac and Cressensac, Occitanie, France. The station opened in 1889 and is on the Orléans–Montauban railway line. The station is served by TER (local) services.

== Train services ==
The following services currently call at Gignac-Cressensac:

- local service (TER Occitanie) Brive-la-Gaillarde–Cahors–Montauban–Toulouse

Preceding station	TER Occitanie	Following station
Brive-la-Gaillarde Terminus	19	Souillac towards Toulouse
