= Pommevic station =

Railway station in Pommevic, France

Coordinates: 44°06′07″N 0°55′57″E

Pommevic

General information
- Location: Pommevic, Tarn-et-Garonne, Occitanie; France
- Line: Bordeaux–Sète railway
- Platforms: 2
- Tracks: 2

Other information
- Station code: 87618058

History
- Closed: 2017
Location

Pommevic is a former railway station in Pommevic, Occitanie, France. The station is on the Bordeaux–Sète railway. The station was served by TER (local) services operated by SNCF, between Agen and Toulouse. Train service was suspended in 2017.
