= Marssac-sur-Tarn station =

Railway station in Marssac-sur-Tarn, France

Coordinates: 43°54′55″N 2°01′37″E

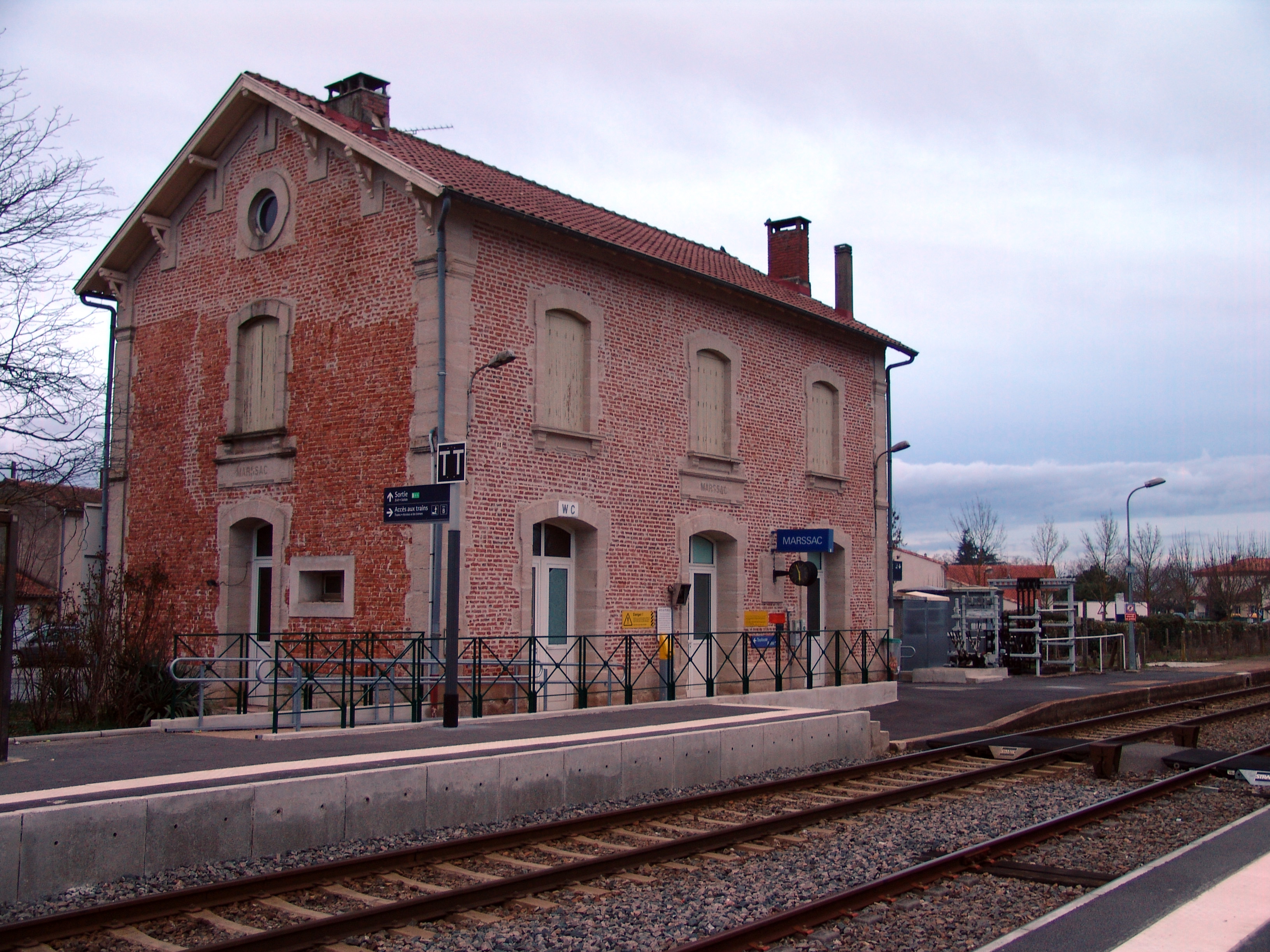
Marssac-sur-Tarn station main building

Marssac-sur-Tarn is a railway station in Marssac-sur-Tarn, Occitanie, France. Located on the Tessonnières to Albi railway line, this station is served by TER (local) services operated by SNCF.

== Train services ==
The following services currently call at Marssac-sur-Tarn:

- local service (TER Occitanie) Toulouse–Albi–Rodez

Preceding station	TER Occitanie	Following station
Tessonnières towards Toulouse	2	Albi-Ville towards Rodez
