= Gaillac station =

Railway station in Gaillac, France

Coordinates: 43°54′22″N 1°53′41″E

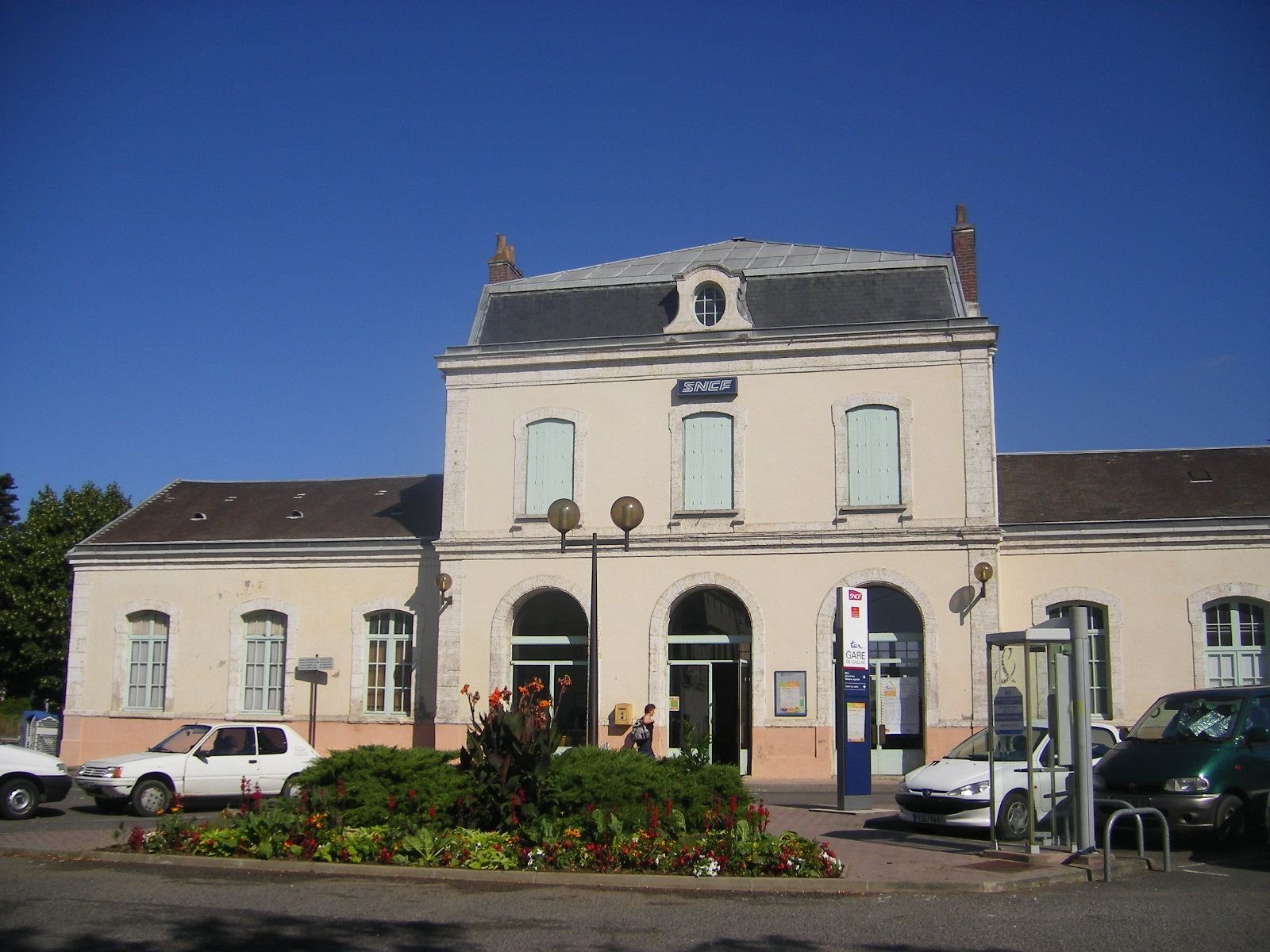
Gaillac station

Gaillac is a railway station in Gaillac, Occitanie, France. Located on the Brive–Toulouse (via Capdenac) railway line, the station is served by TER (local) services operated by SNCF.

== Train services ==
The following services currently call at Gaillac:

- local service (TER Occitanie) Toulouse–Albi–Rodez
- local service (TER Occitanie) Toulouse–Figeac–Aurillac

Preceding station	TER Occitanie	Following station
Lisle-sur-Tarn towards Toulouse	2	Tessonnières towards Rodez
Lisle-sur-Tarn towards Toulouse	3	Cordes-Vindrac towards Aurillac
