= Grisolles, Tarn-et-Garonne =

Grisolles
- Commune
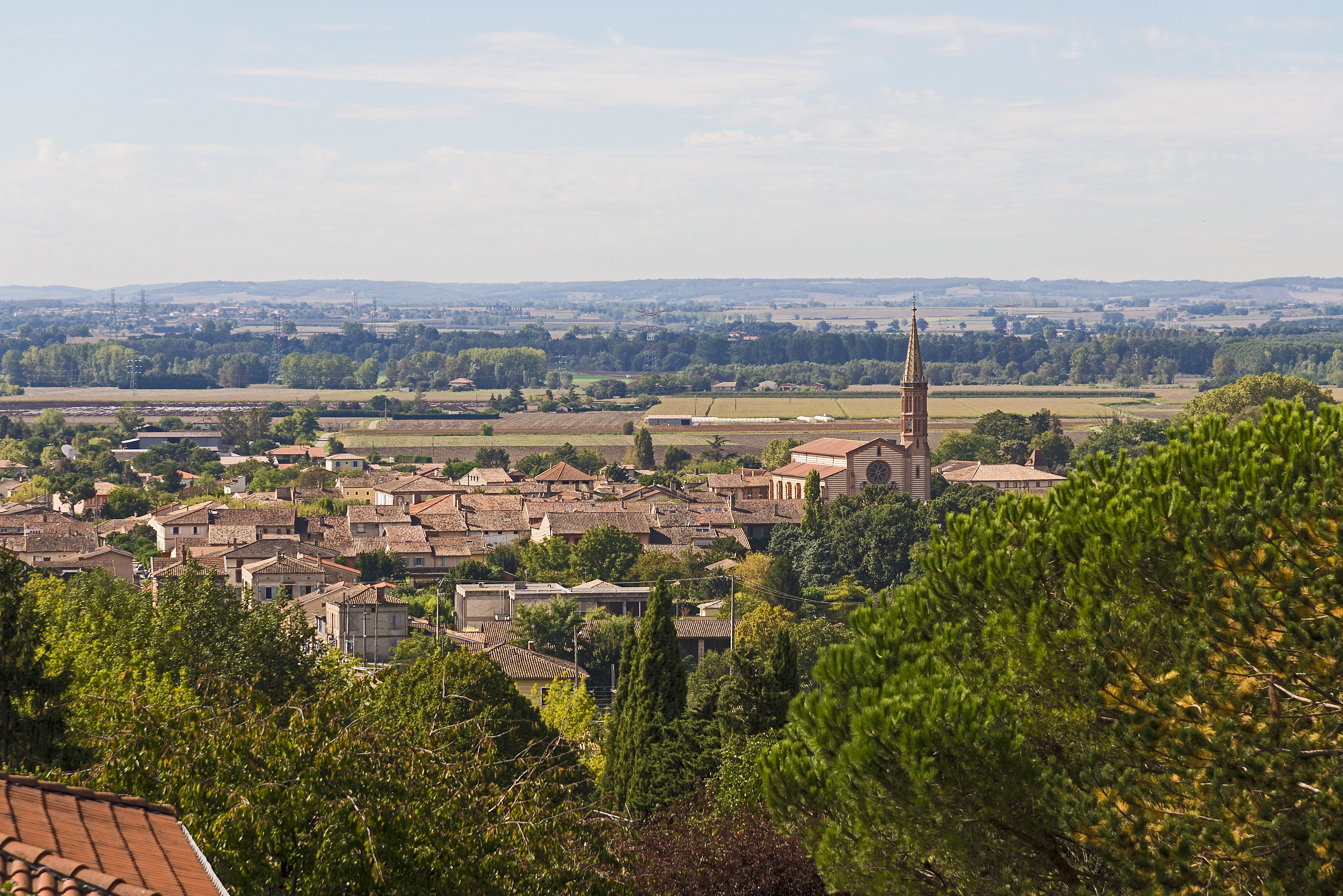
- A general view of Grisolles

- Coat of arms
- Location of Grisolles
- Location within France Location within Occitanie
- Coordinates: 43°49′44″N 1°17′48″E
- Country: France
- Region: Occitania
- Department: Tarn-et-Garonne
- Arrondissement: Montauban
- Canton: Verdun-sur-Garonne
- Intercommunality: Grand Sud Tarn et Garonne

Government
  - Mayor (2020–2026): Serge Castella
- Area^{1}: 17.6 km^{2} (6.8 sq mi)
- Elevation: 110 m (360 ft)
- Highest elevation: 208 m (682 ft)
- Lowest elevation: 94 m (308 ft)
- Population (2023): 4,214
  - Density: 239/km^{2} (620/sq mi)
- Time zone: UTC+01:00 (CET)
  - Summer (DST): UTC+02:00 (CEST)
- INSEE/Postal code: 82075 /82170
- ^{1} French Land Register data, which excludes lakes, ponds, glaciers > 1 km^{2} (0.386 sq mi or 247 acres) and river estuaries.

Grisolles (French pronunciation: [ɡʁizɔl]; Occitan: Grisòlas) is a commune in the Tarn-et-Garonne department in the Occitanie region in southern France. Grisolles station has rail connections to Toulouse, Montauban and Brive-la-Gaillarde.

== Population ==
Historical population
Year	Pop.	±% p.a.
1968	2,126	—
1975	2,349	+1.44%
1982	2,619	+1.57%
1990	2,772	+0.71%
1999	2,917	+0.57%
2007	3,308	+1.58%
2012	3,812	+2.88%
2017	4,115	+1.54%
2023	4,214	+0.40%
Source: INSEE

== Monuments ==
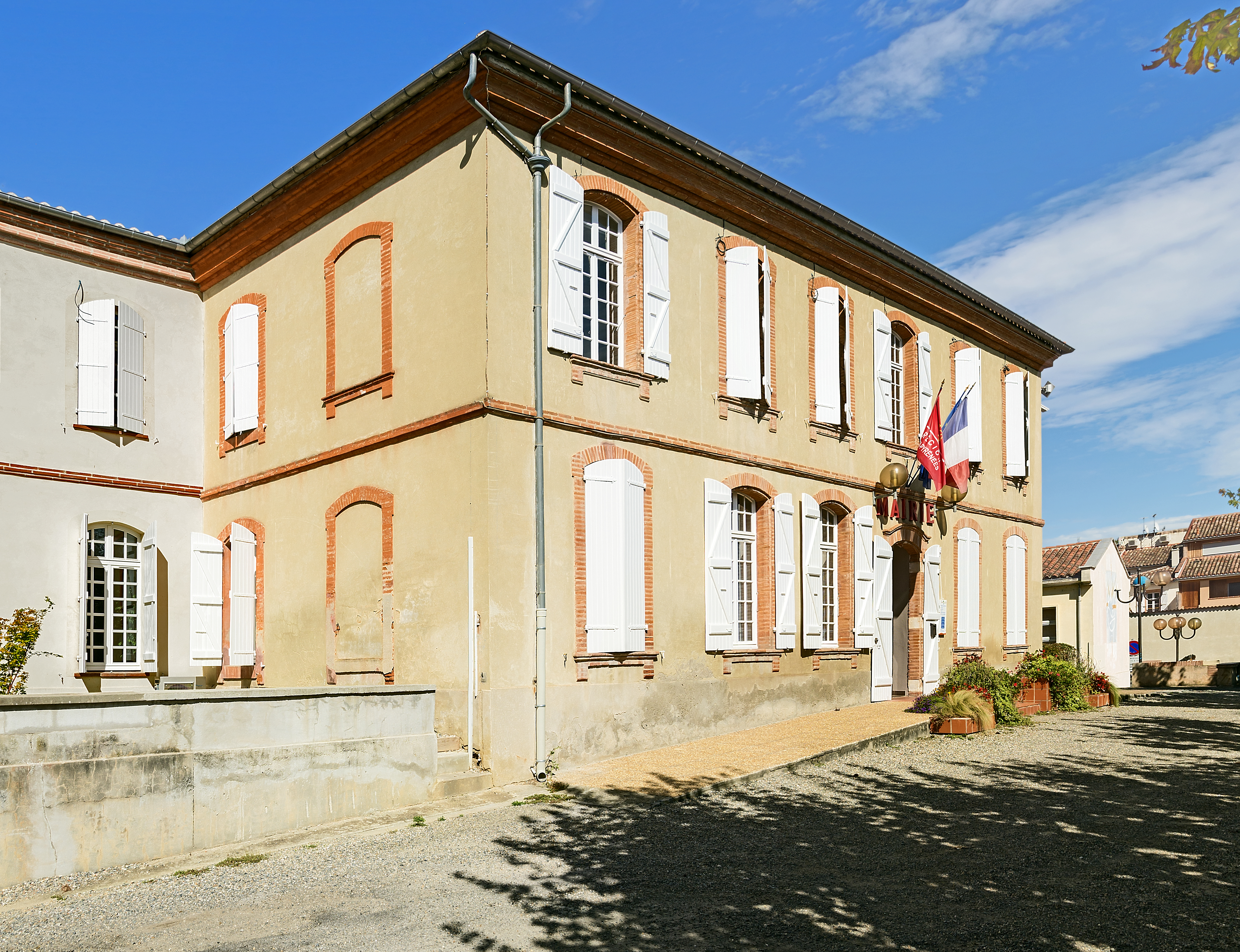

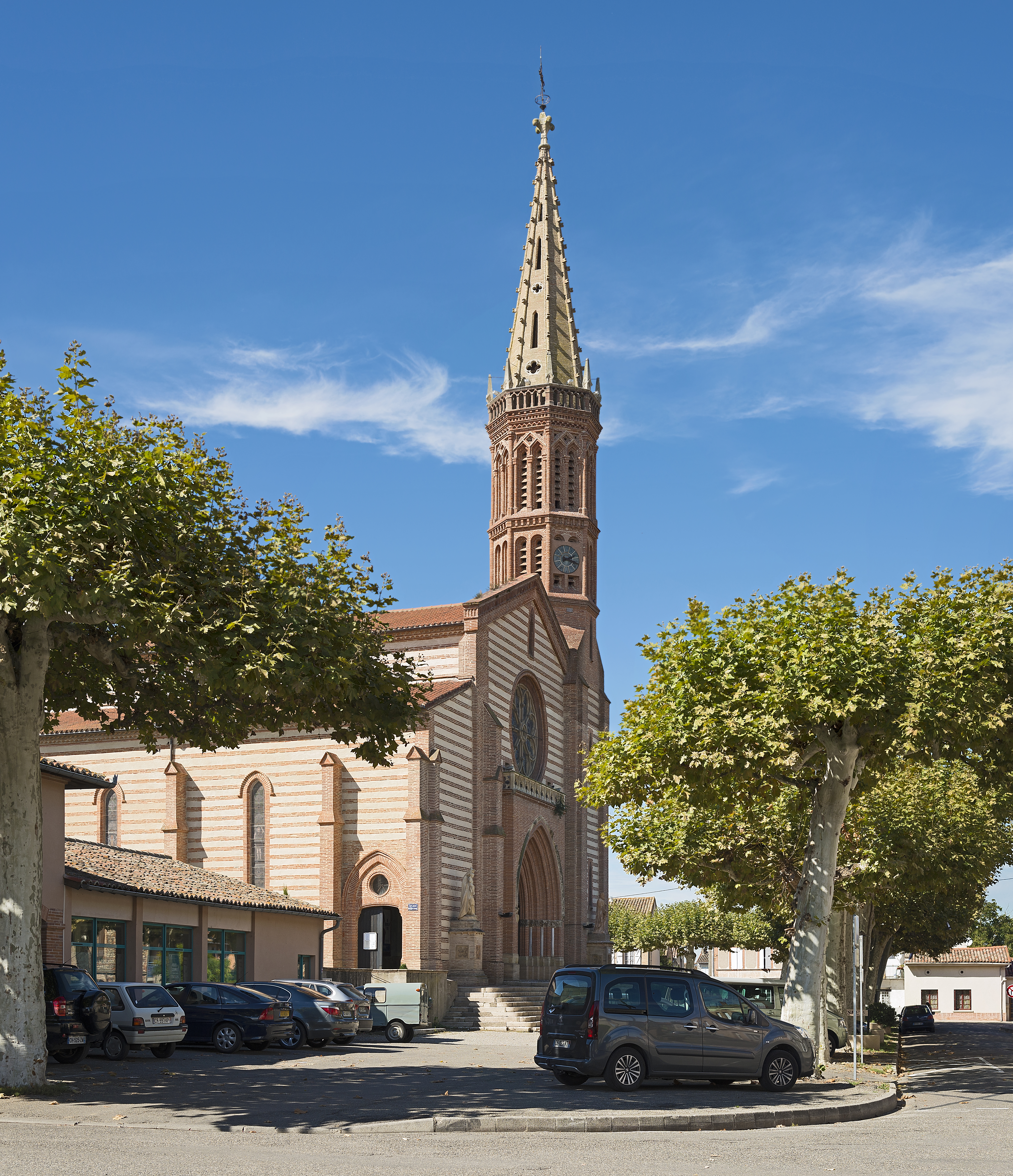

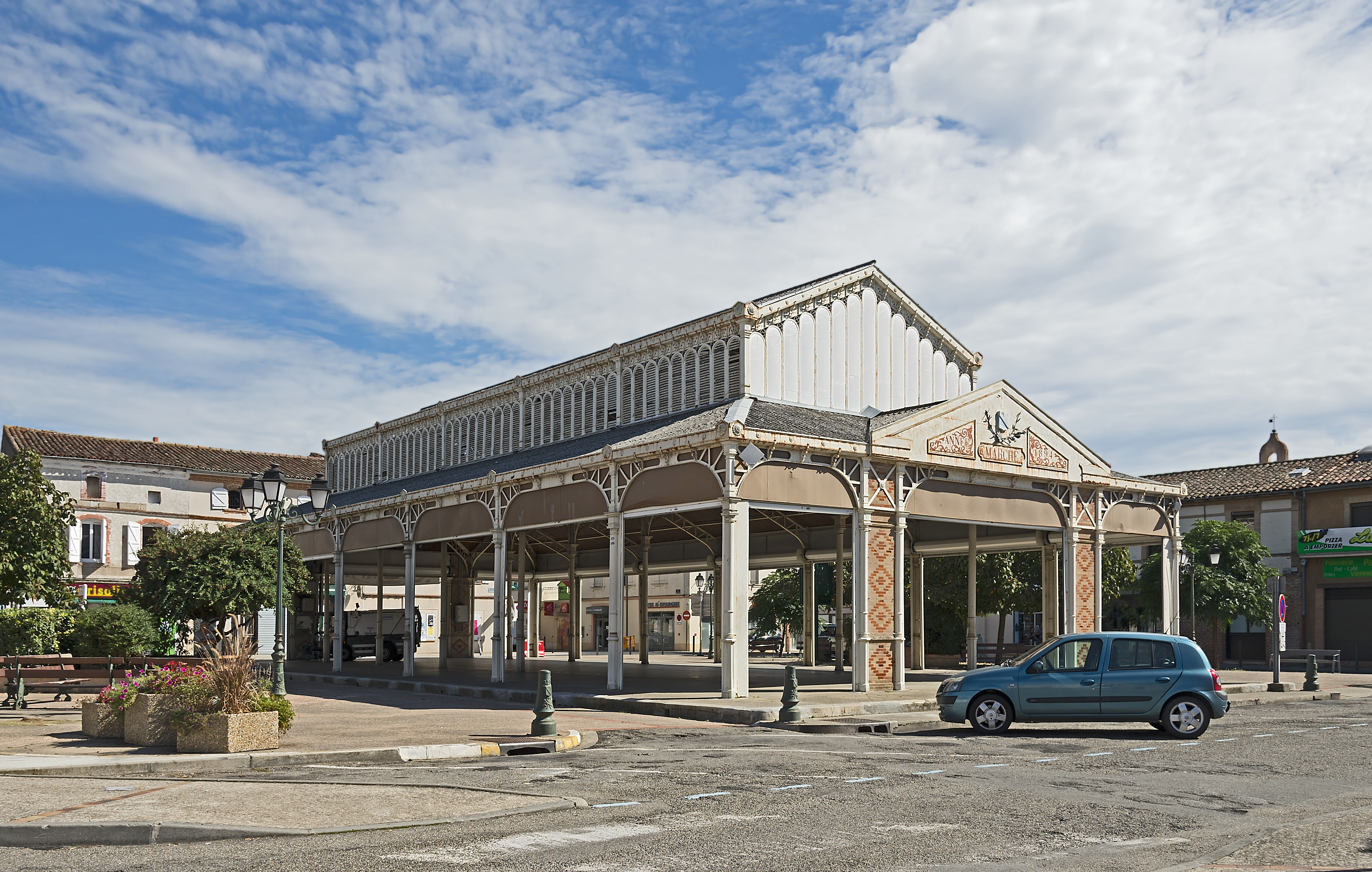

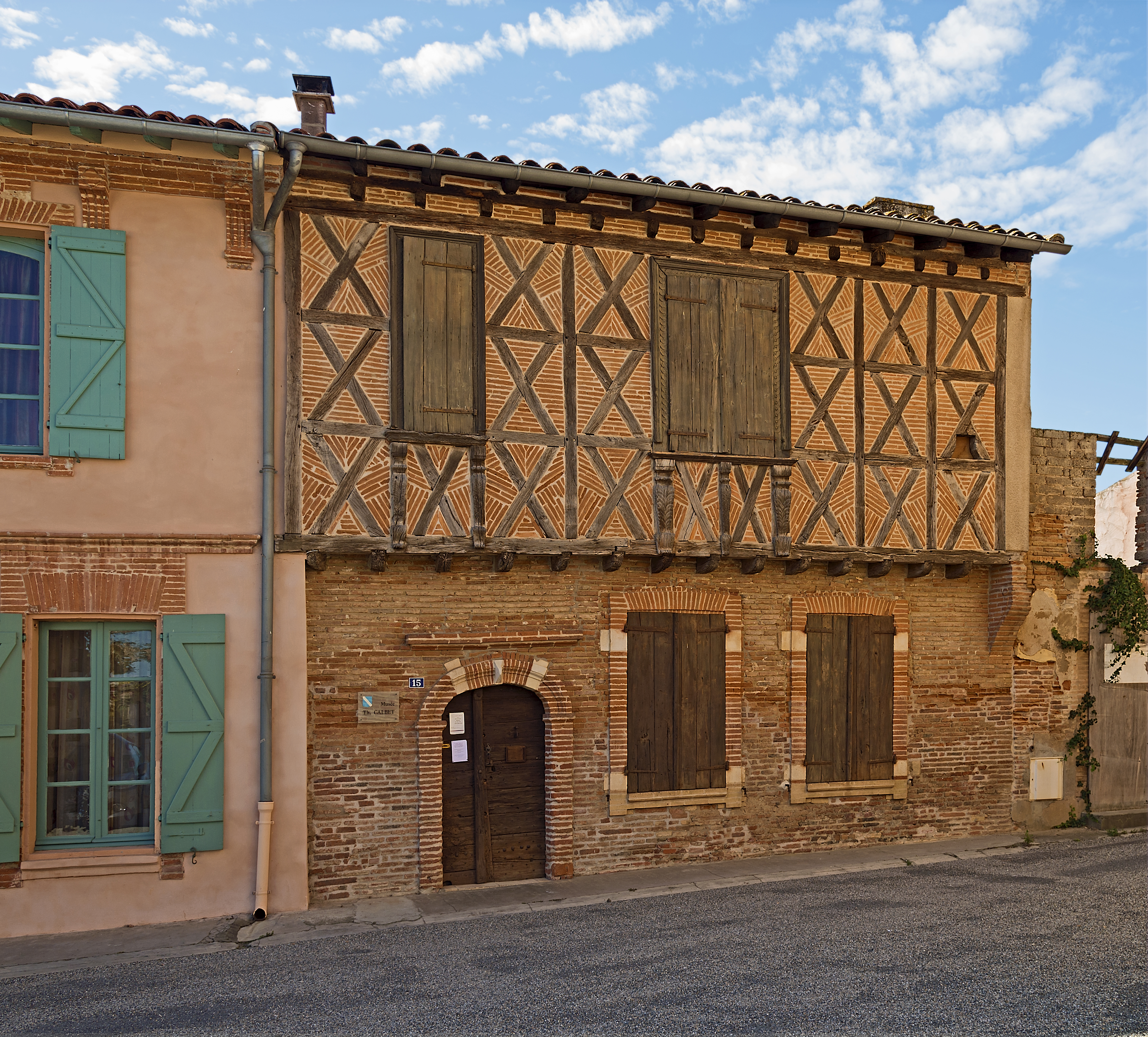

== See also ==
- Communes of the Tarn-et-Garonne department
