= Tessonnières station =

Railway station in Gaillac, France

Coordinates: 43°55′41″N 1°56′14″E

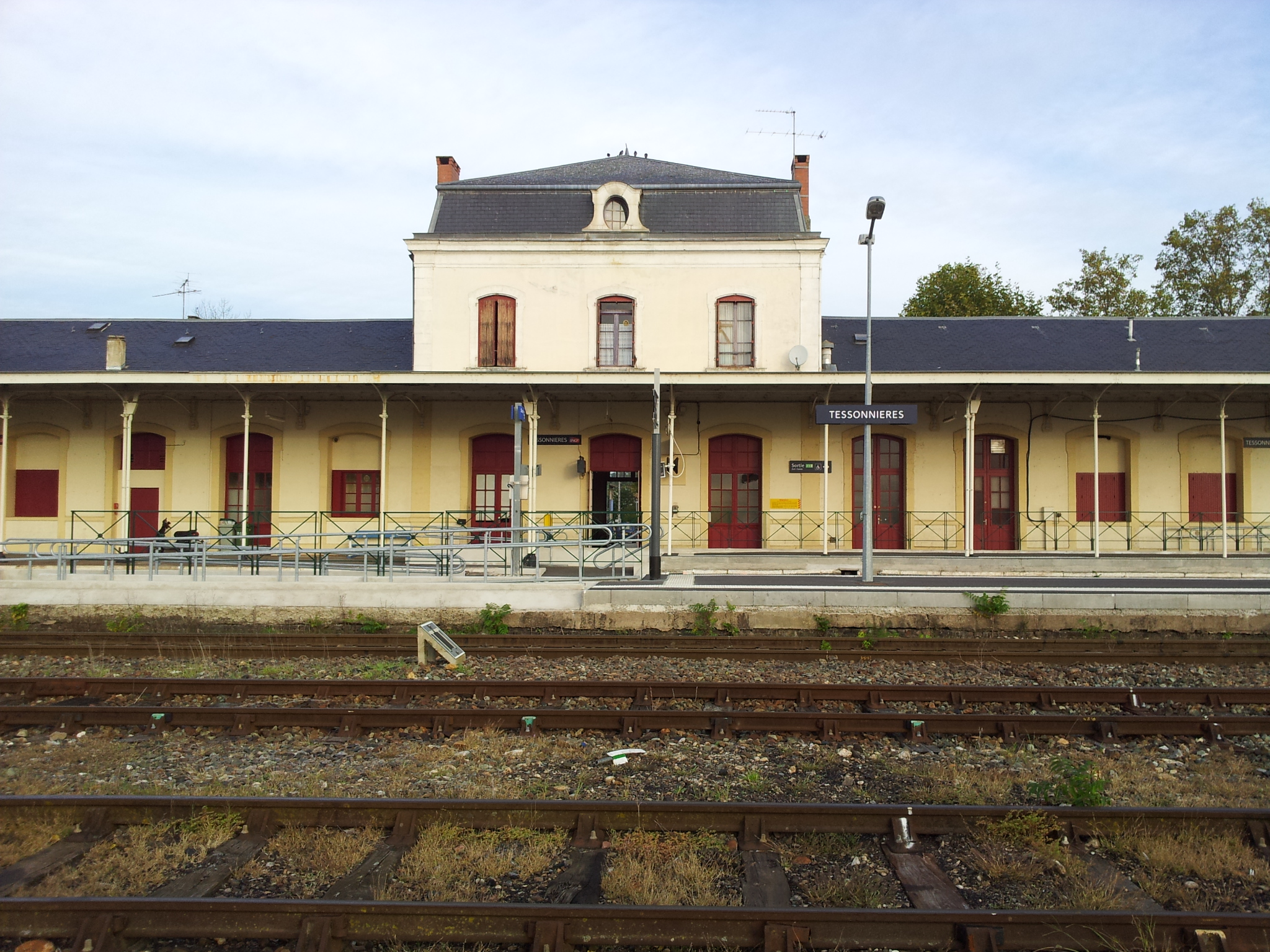
The train station in Tessonnières

Tessonnières is a railway station in Tessonnières, Occitanie region in southern France. It is on the Brive–Toulouse (via Capdenac) and Tessonnières to Albi railway lines. The station is served by TER (local) services operated by SNCF.

== Train services ==
The following services currently call at Tessonnières:

- local service (TER Occitanie) Toulouse–Albi–Rodez

Preceding station	TER Occitanie	Following station
Gaillac towards Toulouse	2	Marssac-sur-Tarn towards Rodez
