= Malause =

- Commune
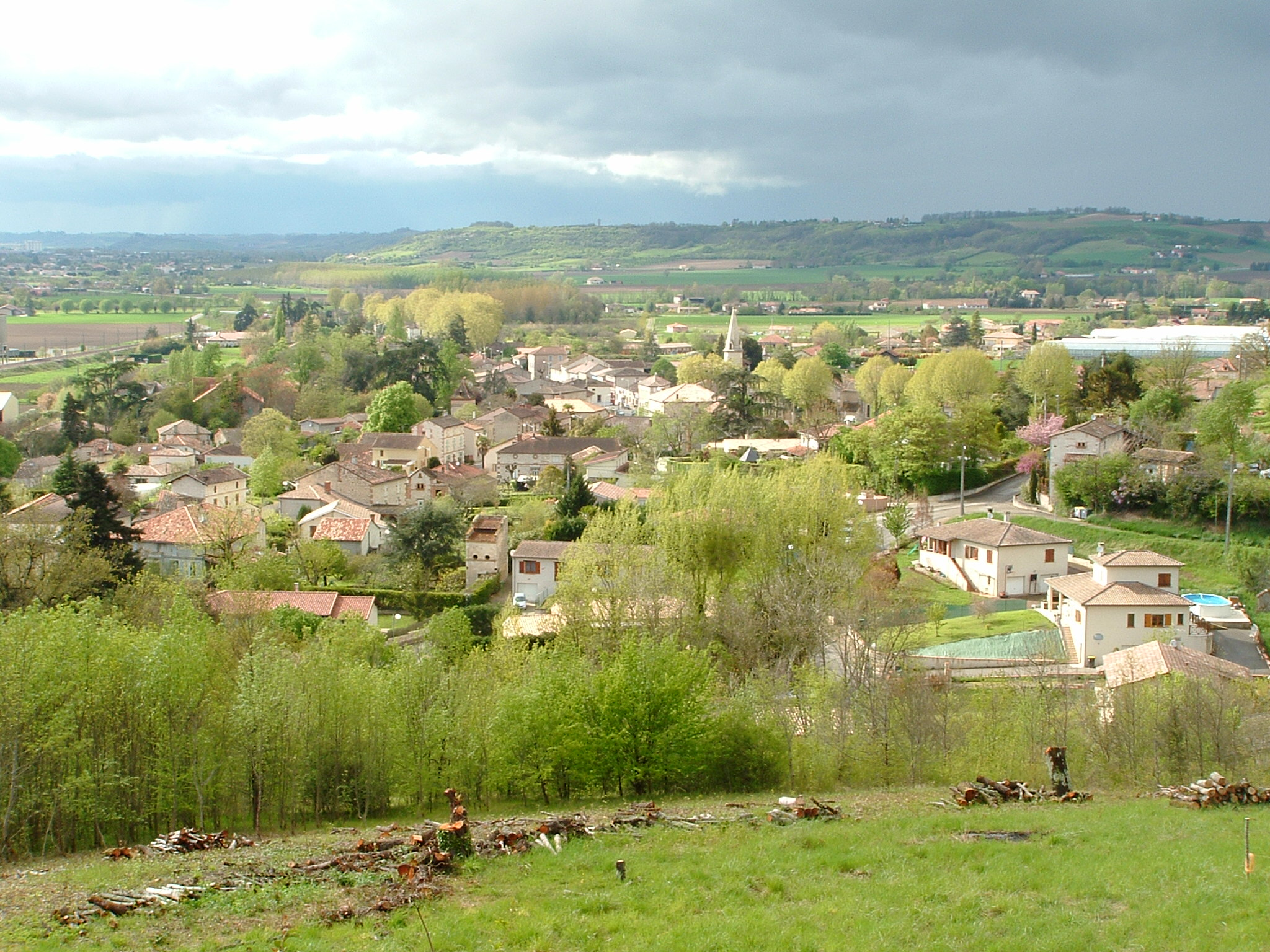
- A general view of Malause

- Coat of arms
- Location of Malause
- Location within France Location within Occitanie
- Coordinates: 44°05′26″N 0°58′26″E
- Country: France
- Region: Occitania
- Department: Tarn-et-Garonne
- Arrondissement: Castelsarrasin
- Canton: Garonne-Lomagne-Brulhois
- Intercommunality: Deux Rives

Government
  - Mayor (2020–2026): Marie-Bernard Maerten
- Area^{1}: 11.9 km^{2} (4.6 sq mi)
- Elevation: 65 m (213 ft)
- Highest elevation: 195 m (640 ft)
- Lowest elevation: 56 m (184 ft)
- Population (2023): 1,253
  - Density: 105/km^{2} (273/sq mi)
- Time zone: UTC+01:00 (CET)
  - Summer (DST): UTC+02:00 (CEST)
- INSEE/Postal code: 82101 /82200
- ^{1} French Land Register data, which excludes lakes, ponds, glaciers > 1 km^{2} (0.386 sq mi or 247 acres) and river estuaries.

Malause (French pronunciation: [maloz]; Occitan: Malausa) is a commune in the Tarn-et-Garonne department in the Occitanie region in southern France.

== See also ==
- Communes of the Tarn-et-Garonne department
