= Saint-Nicolas-Saint-Romain station =

Railway station in Saint-Nicolas-de-la-Balerme, France

Coordinates: 44°08′38″N 0°46′35″E

Saint-Nicolas-Saint-Romain
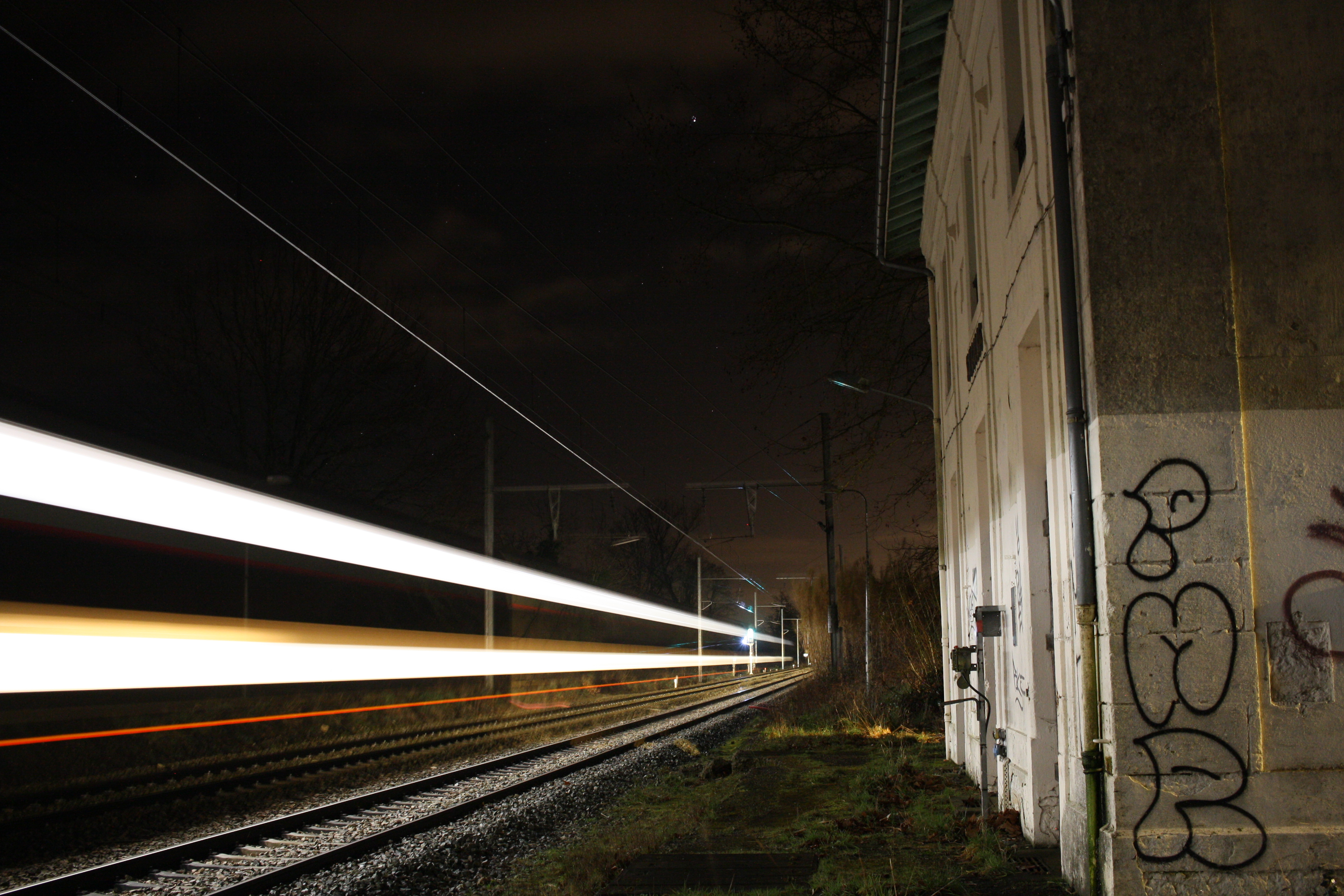
- View from the side of the track

General information
- Location: Saint-Nicolas-de-la-Balerme, Lot-et-Garonne, Nouvelle-Aquitaine; France
- Line: Bordeaux–Sète railway
- Platforms: 2
- Tracks: 2

Other information
- Station code: 87586180

History
- Closed: 2011
Location

Saint-Nicolas-Saint-Romain is a former railway station in Saint-Nicolas-de-la-Balerme, Nouvelle-Aquitaine, France. The station is located on the Bordeaux–Sète railway. The station was served by TER (local) services operated by SNCF. It was closed for passenger traffic in 2011.
