= Labarthe-Inard station =

Railway station in Labarthe-Inard, France

Labarthe-Inard

General information
- Location: Labarthe-Inard, Haute-Garonne, Occitanie, France
- Coordinates: 43°06′17″N 0°51′11″E
- Line: Toulouse–Bayonne railway
- Platforms: 2
- Tracks: 2

Other information
- Station code: 87611129

History
- Opened: 9 June 1862
Location

Labarthe-Inard is a former railway station in Labarthe-Inard, Occitanie, France. The station is on the Toulouse–Bayonne railway line. The station was served by TER (local) services operated by the SNCF.
