= Toulouse railway network =

Railway system in Toulouse, France

- Symbol of Toulouse urban trains

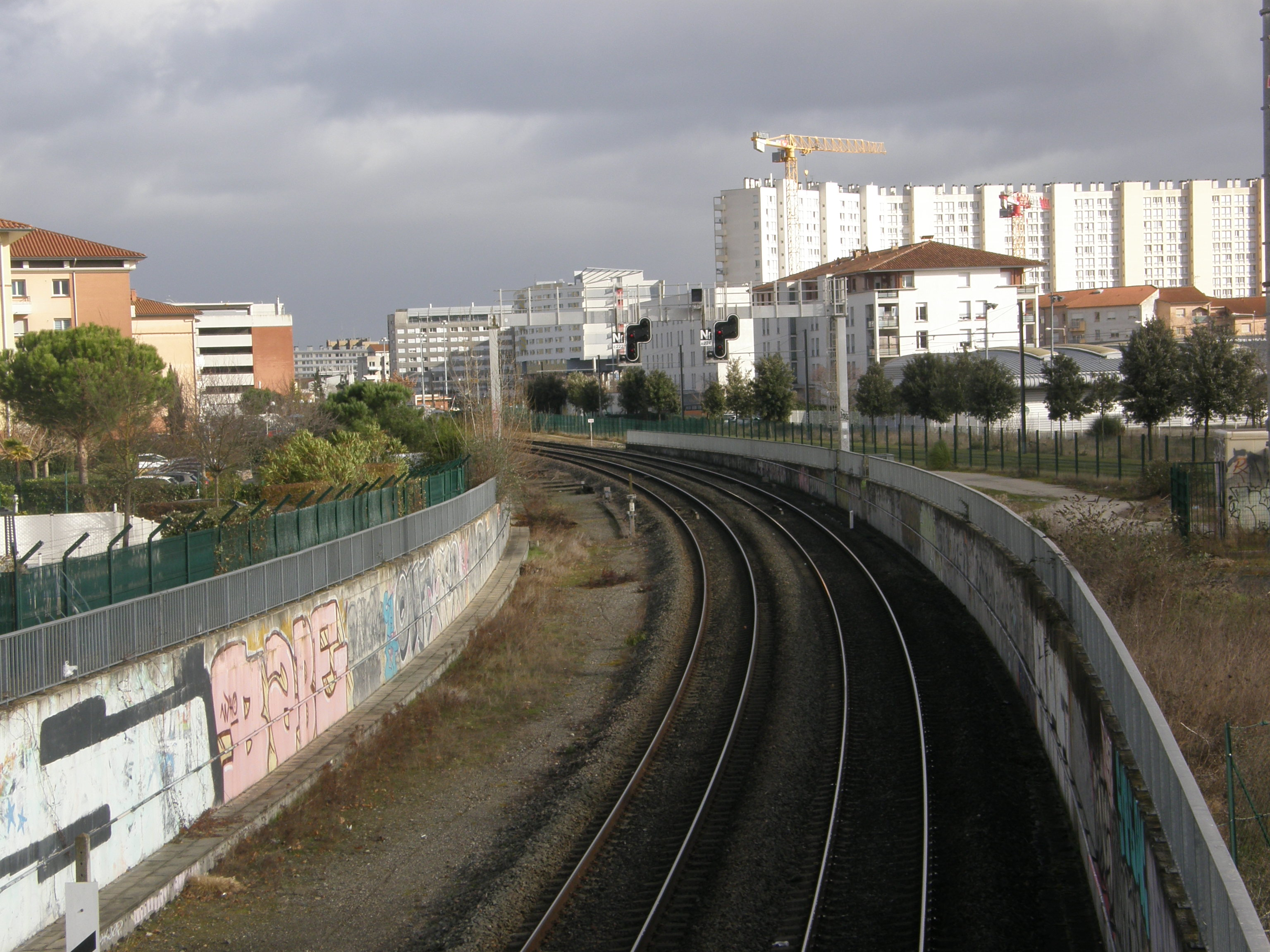
- Line C leading to Arènes at La Cépière

Overview
- Native name: Réseau ferroviaire de Toulouse
- Area served: Toulouse area, France
- Transit type: Train; Commuter rail
- Line number: 3 (urban rail lines); 5 (national rail network)
- Number of stations: 27

Operation
- Operators: SNCF; Tisséo (Line C only and partially)

Technical
- Track gauge: 1,435 mm (4 ft 8 1/2 in) standard gauge
- Electrification: 1500 V DC Catenary

The Toulouse railway network is a railway network in Toulouse metropolitan area in France. Established in 1856, with the opening of the Matabiau station (now Toulouse main station), it has six lines, or eight branches, arranged more or less in a star shape.

It is operated and managed by SNCF and serves 27 stations, including 12 inside the city of Toulouse.

== History ==
- 1856: First train station, Toulouse-Matabiau, is opened.
- 1857: Network extends to Sète.
- 1858: Construction of the Brive-la-Gaillarde–Toulouse railway commences.
- 1861: Network extends to Portet-Saint-Simon and Foix.
- 1862: Network extends to Montréjeau.
- 1863: Network extends to Tarbes.
- 1864: Brive-la-Gaillarde–Toulouse railway opens alongside Lourdes.
- 1866: Line towards Puyoô via Pau opens.
- 1867: Network extends to Bayonne.
- 1887: Horsecars are introduced.
- 1903–1905: Matabiau station is rebuilt.
- 1906: Tramways are electrified.
- 1937–1957: Horsecars are phased out as automobiles and buses take over.
- 1967: Le Capitole high-speed train begins service.
- 1993: Line C of railway network is opened with line A of Toulouse Metro.
- 2003: Line C is partially doubled and 3 stations are added.
- 2007: Saint-Agne station in line D become a transfer station with new line B of metro.
- 2009: Gallieni-Cancéropôle station is opened. It was originally meant to be part of line C but was not finally included.
- 2011 - 2013: Line 1 of TER (to Saint-Sulpice) is doubled.

== Network ==
=== The star shape ===
Toulouse-Matabiau station

The Toulouse railway network is roughly star-shaped. The structuring axis is the Bordeaux–Sète line, which crosses the agglomeration in a north-west - south-east orientation, following on a part of the route the Canal du Midi. Near the city center is the most important station of the city, Toulouse-Matabiau.

Starting from the latter and going back to Bordeaux, the station of Toulouse-Raynal is reached first, a vast former marshalling yard and current SNCF technicentre located not far from the passenger station. Then, a triangular junction allows trains to join the Brive-la-Gaillarde – Toulouse (via Capdenac) line, major axis of communication of the north-east of Midi-Pyrenees since it is from this that all tertiary lines stand out (Montauban–La Crémade, Tessonnières–Albi, Lexos–Montauban), and which serves cities such as Albi, Rodez, Castres or Mazamet.

WEith the line following the Garonne valley, it is possible to reach several stations in the north of the city and the nearby agglomeration, as well as to the large Saint-Jory station, where will be the connection from the LGV Bordeaux–Toulouse. Then, further north is the Montauban-Ville-Bourbon station from where the Orléans–Montauban line (or POLT, acronym for "Paris - Orléans - Limoges - Toulouse"), which is the old fast route that took the TEE Capitole and allows to reach the capital without passing through Bordeaux.

South of Toulouse-Matabiau, the various railway tracks of the city form an arc. First of all, for a few kilometers, all the tracks lead south, parallel to the Canal du Midi. Then, they separate shortly after the twin tunnels at Guilhemery, half continuing south-east and, after crossing the small Montaudran station and several stations of the agglomeration (Labège-Innopole, Labège-Village, Escalquens, Montlaur, Baziège), continue towards Sète, Marseille or Spain via Perpignan; the other half goes southwest.

After crossing the Saint-Agne station, and its transfer with the line B of the metro, the line Toulouse - Bayonne crosses the Garonne and the Ramier Island, from which separate decommissioned tracks which allowed the origin to serve factories of the SNPE and those of AZF today destroyed following the disaster of the same name. Then a second bifurcation takes place:

- On the one hand, in double-track, towards Portet, from where it is possible to reach the west of Spain with the Toulouse–Bayonne line, or to continue towards the east of the Pyrenees or Andorra with the line from Portet–Puigcerda. The two lines then serve in the urban area either the Muret station (Toulouse–Bayonne), or those of Pinsaguel and Pins-Justaret (Portet–Puigcerda);
- On the other hand, in single track: this last line, the Saint-Agne - Auch line, after the Gallieni-Cancéropôle station, full back north to the Arènes. Although it is necessary to make a wide detour to the south of the city, this situation is due to the fact that it was simpler to build the line to follow the existing structure and to go through what was still the periphery of the city than to cross the hypercentre. After the Saint-Cyprien - Arènes station and its connections with the metro line A and the tram, the line crosses the west of the city, with the stations of TOEC, Lardenne (or Capelles), Saint-Martin-du-Touch and Ramassiers. At the exit of the city, the Colomiers station is the western terminus of the line C of the Toulouse public transport network which starts at the Arènes. Then, in the direction of Auch, we find the small stations of Lycée International, Pibrac and Brax-Léguevin.

=== Urban lines ===
==== Line C ====
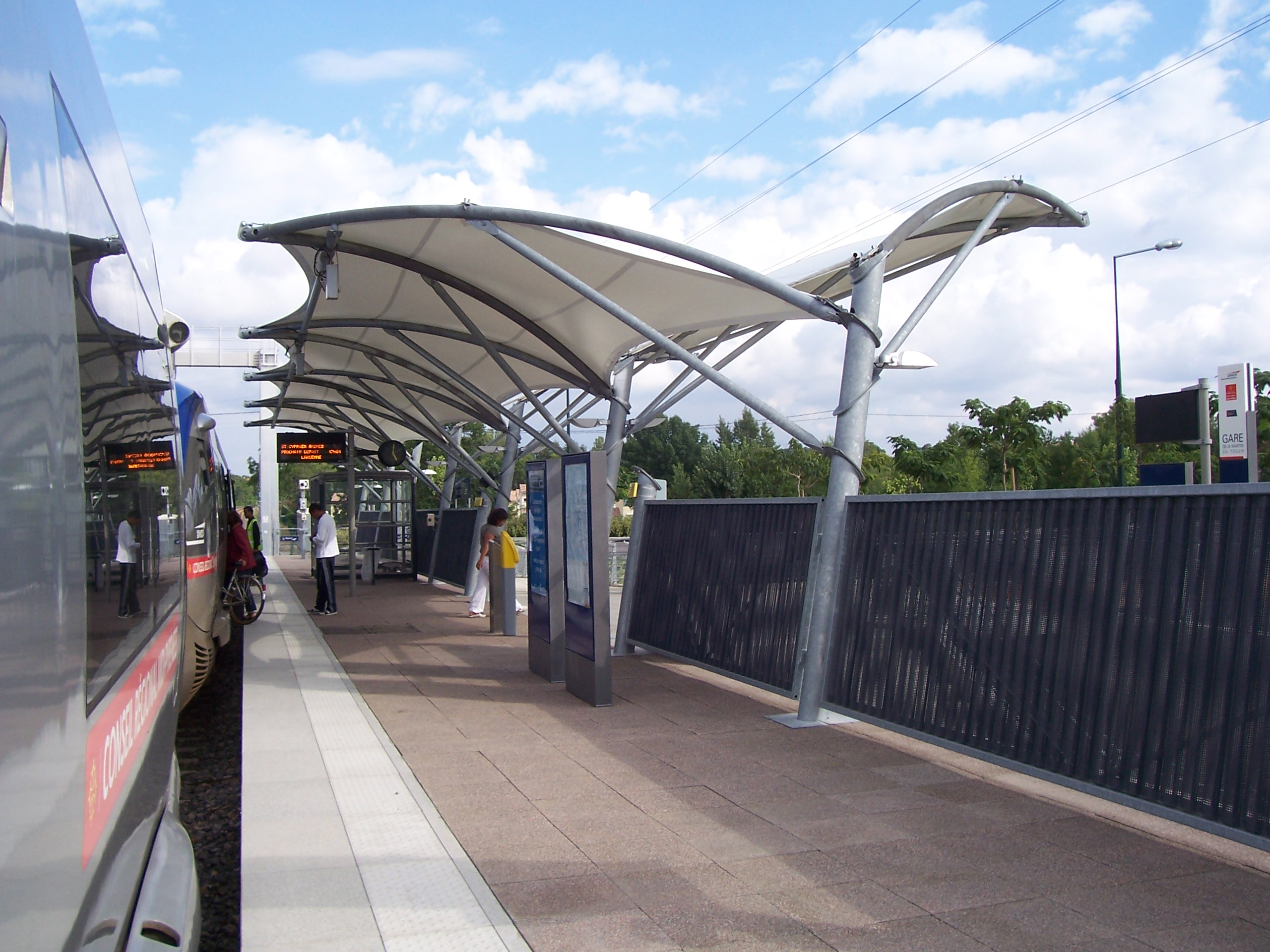
RER system of Toulouse : line C, Saint-Martin-du-Touch station

This line is a kind of RER that joins the city of Colomiers to the west of Toulouse. It was opened just after the line A. This line is just a section of the TER train line between Toulouse and Auch, going from the station Arènes to Colomiers. The TER line was adapted between these two stations, to follow the Metro ratebase. Frequencies were increased to 15 min in 2005 after doubling of the railway infrastructure.

It is the only railway of the network partially operated by Tisséo, so it also figures in their plans and is accessible with their trip tickets.

==== Line D ====
Like line C, the line D (or line 23 of TER Occitanie) is a railway operated by SNCF running to the town of Muret, south of Toulouse with adapted frequencies.

It is part of the Toulouse–Bayonne railway.

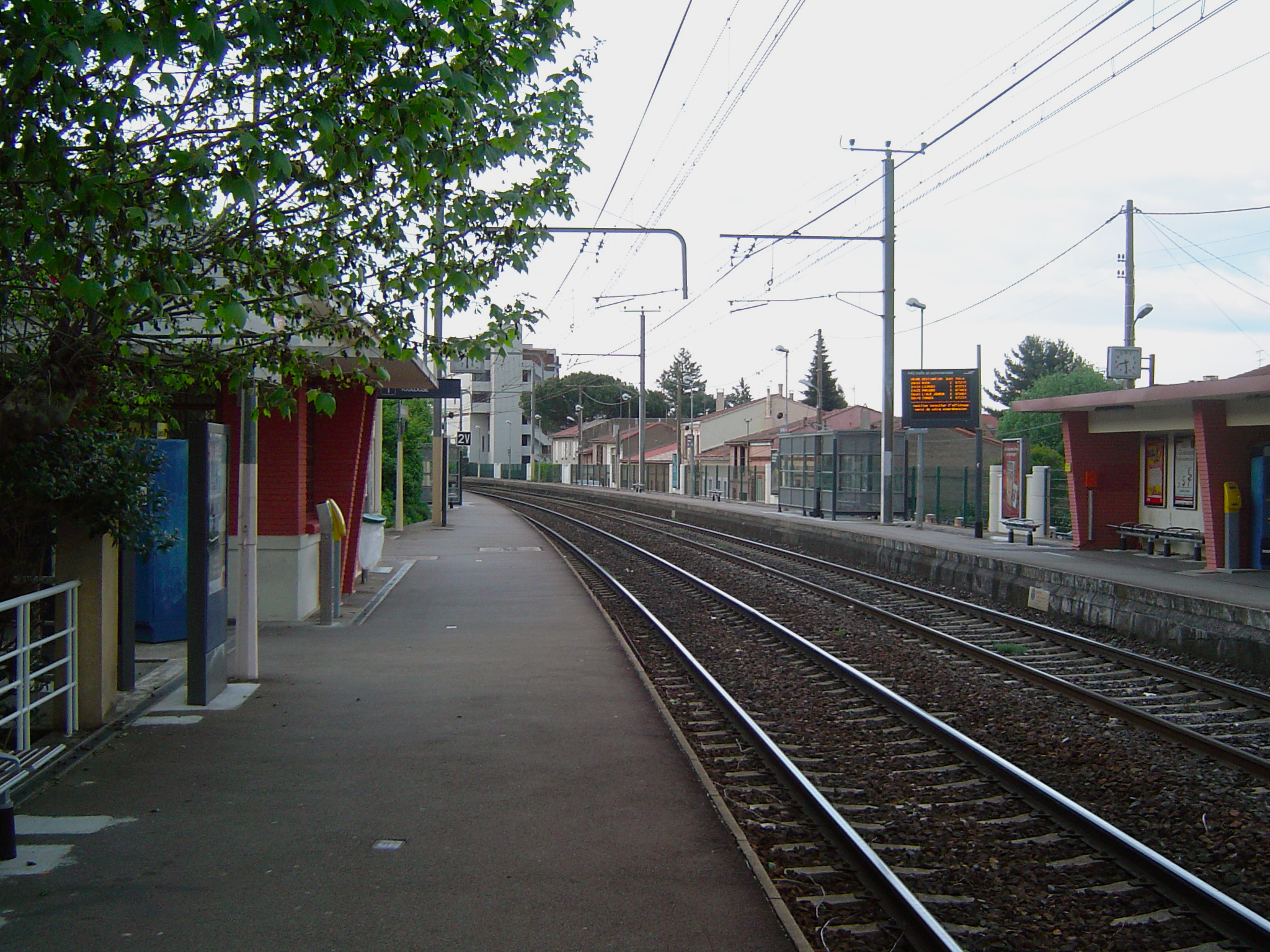
Line D at Saint-Agne station

==== Line F ====
Line F is a railway operated by SNCF running to the town of Escalquens, south-east of Toulouse. It is the only line with no dedicated trains.

It is part of the Bordeaux–Sète railway.

==== Line 1 of TER Occitanie ====
Line 1 of TER Occitanie network runs to Saint-Sulpice station. It is the only line without a specific letter.

== Future ==
=== North RER ===
The north RER is a project of line to Castelnau-d'Estretéfonds station. This project is part of Bordeaux – Toulouse LGV and Toulouse Aerospace Express metro line.

=== Partial Double tracking Line C ===
It is planned to fully double track line C between kilometer markers 10.9 and 12.8. This would also involve a redevelopment of Lardenne station, and a removal of the level crossings around Lardenne and Saint-Martin-du-Touch stations

== See also ==
- Toulouse Metro
- Toulouse tramway
