= Stadium de Toulouse =

Multi-purpose stadium in Toulouse, France

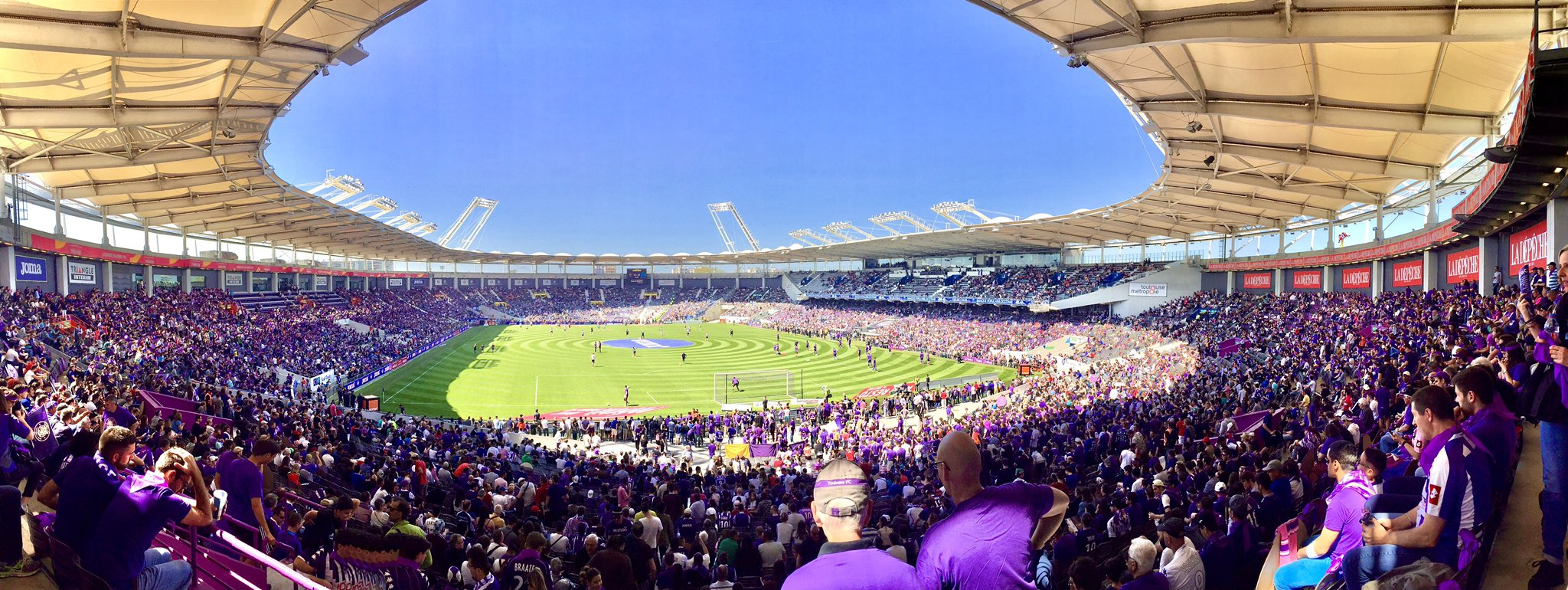
- Interactive map of Stadium de Toulouse
- Full name: Stade de Toulouse
- Location: 1, Allée Gabriel Biènés, Toulouse, France
- Coordinates: 43°34′59″N 1°26′3″E
- Owner: Mairie de Toulouse
- Capacity: 33,150 (after most recent renovation works)
- Surface: AirFibr (hybrid grass)

Construction
- Opened: 1937
- Renovated: 1949, 1998 and 2016

Tenants
- Toulouse FC (1970-present); Stade Toulousain (selected matches)

Stadium de Toulouse (Occitan: Estadi de Tolosa), previously named Stadium Municipal (Estadi Municipal), is the largest multi-purpose stadium in Toulouse, France. It is currently used mostly for football matches, mainly those of the Toulouse Football Club, as well as rugby matches for Stade Toulousain in the European Rugby Champions Cup and Top 14. It is located on the island of Ramier near the centre of Toulouse. It is a pure football and rugby ground, and therefore has no athletics track surrounding the field. The stadium is able to hold 33,150 people.

== History ==
The stadium was built in 1937 for the 1938 FIFA World Cup (but again under construction, the World Cup matches were played in the Stade du T.O.E.C., 4 kilometers further North) and has undergone two extensive renovations, in 1949 and 1997.

The stadium staged six matches during the 1998 FIFA World Cup.

It was also used as a host venue during the 2007 Rugby World Cup for games such as Japan-Fiji, won by the latter 35–31. On 13 November 2009 the stadium hosted international rugby again when France hosted South Africa. At the time, South Africa were leading the series by 20 wins to 10 (6 drawn).

Michael Jackson performed in front of 40,000 people during his Dangerous World Tour on 16 September 1992.

== Transport ==
The stadium is served by two bus stops (West and East), where Tisséo buses L4 (Cours Dillon-Basso Cambo), 34 (Arènes-Université Paul Sabatier), L5 (Empalot-Roques/Roquettes) and 152 (Empalot-Roques/IUC) stop. Shuttle buses operate on match days from Esquirol metro (Line A), and the stadium is also a short walk (~10 mins) from metro stations Empalot and Saint Michel-Marcel Langer (Line B). It is also near the Croix de Pierre stop of the newly extended Toulouse tramway.

== Tournament results ==
=== 1938 FIFA World Cup ===
The stadium was initially one of the venues of the 1938 FIFA World Cup but again under construction, the matches were played in the Stade du T.O.E.C. in Toulouse too.

=== 1998 FIFA World Cup ===
The stadium was one of the venues of the 1998 FIFA World Cup, and held the following matches:

Date	Team #1	Result	Team #2	Pool	Attendance
11 June 1998	Cameroon	1–1	Austria	Group B	33,500
14 June 1998	Argentina	1–0	Japan	Group H	33,500
18 June 1998	South Africa	1–1	Denmark	Group C	33,500
22 June 1998	Romania	2–1	England	Group G	33,500
24 June 1998	Nigeria	1–3	Paraguay	Group D	33,500
29 June 1998	Netherlands	2–1	FR Yugoslavia	Round of 16	33,500

=== 2007 Rugby World Cup ===
The stadium was one of the venues for rugby union's 2007 World Cup

Date	Pool	Home team		Away team		Attendance
12 September 2007	Pool B	Japan	31	Fiji	35	34,500
16 September 2007	Pool D	France	87	Namibia	10	35,339
25 September 2007	Pool C	Romania	14	Portugal	10	35,526
29 September 2007	Pool C	New Zealand	85	Romania	8	35,608

=== UEFA Euro 2016 ===
The stadium was one of the venues of UEFA Euro 2016, and hosted the following matches:

Date	Time (CET)	Team #1	Result	Team #2	Round	Attendance
13 June 2016	15:00	Spain	1–0	Czech Republic	Group D	29,400
17 June 2016	15:00	Italy	1–0	Sweden	Group E	29,600
20 June 2016	21:00	Russia	0–3	Wales	Group B	28,840
26 June 2016	21:00	Hungary	0–4	Belgium	Round of 16	28,921

=== 2023 Rugby World Cup matches ===
Date	Time (CET)	Team #1	Result	Team #2	Round	Attendance
10 September 2023	13:00	Japan	42–12	Chile	Pool D	30,187
15 September 2023	21:00	New Zealand	71–3	Namibia	Pool A	31,996
23 September 2023	14:00	Georgia	18–18	Portugal	Pool C	31,889
28 September 2023	21:00	Japan	28–22	Samoa	Pool D	31,794
8 October 2023	21:00	Fiji	23–24	Portugal	Pool C	32,223

== Rugby League Test matches ==
Stadium Municipal has hosted 14 rugby league internationals, 13 of them involving the France national team, since 1953.

Test#	Date	Result	Attendance	Notes
1	18 October 1953	Other Nationalities def. France 15–10	12,190	1953–54 European Rugby League Championship
2	7 November 1954	France drew with Great Britain 13–13	37,471	1954 Rugby League World Cup
3	8 January 1956	France def. Great Britain 24–7	10,184	1956 France vs New Zealand series
4	3 November 1957	Great Britain def. France 25–14	15,762	
5	6 March 1960	France def. Great Britain 20–18	15,762	
6	2 February 1969	France def. Great Britain 14–9	15,536	
7	28 November 1971	France drew with New Zealand 3–3	5,000	1971 France vs New Zealand series
8	2 February 1972	Great Britain def. France 10–9	11,508	
9	5 November 1972	Australia def. France 31–9	10,332	1972 Rugby League World Cup
10	2 March 1975	France def. Wales 14–7	7,563	1975 Rugby League World Cup
11	7 December 1980	New Zealand def. France 11–3	3,000	1980 France vs New Zealand series
12	5 November 2000	France def. South Africa 56–6	7,969	2000 Rugby League World Cup Group 3
13	6 November 2000	Papua New Guinea def. Tonga 30–22	3,666	2000 Rugby League World Cup Group 3
14	18 November 2005	New Zealand def. France 38–22	12,500	2005 France vs New Zealand

=== Concerts ===
List of entertainment events held at Stadium de Toulouse
Date	Performer(s)	Event	Opening Act(s)	Attendance	Revenue	Additional notes
May 10, 1977	Chuck Berry		Boogaloo Band			
July 4, 1987	David Bowie	Glass Spider Tour	Boogaloo Band	25,000		
September 16, 1992	Michael Jackson	Dangerous World Tour		40,000		Biggest attendance for a single night.
May 24, 2019	Bigflo & Oli		Foé, Berywam	60,000		A second concert was announced on May 24 due to high demand. On May 24, Squeezie joined the singers on stage to perform 'Demain'. On May 24, Black M and Soprano joined the singers to perform 'C'est que du rap'. On May 24, The singers’ father joined them on stage to perform 'Papa'.
May 25, 2019	Bigflo & Oli		Berywam	60,000		A second concert was announced on May 24 due to high demand. On May 24, Squeezie joined the singers on stage to perform 'Demain'. On May 24, Black M and Soprano joined the singers to perform 'C'est que du rap'. On May 24, The singers’ father joined them on stage to perform 'Papa'.
June 8, 2024	Bigflo & Oli		Carbonne	60,000		Vianney, Paul Mirabel, Berywam, Mouss & Hakim, WarEnd, Don Choa and Antoine Dupont joined the singers on stage.
June 9, 2024	Bigflo & Oli		Danyl	60,000		Vianney, Paul Mirabel, Berywam, Mouss & Hakim, WarEnd, Don Choa and Antoine Dupont joined the singers on stage.

== Fronton facilities ==
Stadium de Toulouse is also home to several fronton walls on the stadium campus, which are used for local handball/pelota sports. Most recently, in August 2022, it played host to an international One-Wall handball/Wallball tournament, the 2022 French Open, part of the European 1-Wall Tour, with Great Britain's Dan Grant winning the Men's Open title and Helena Hernanz Sanchez of France winning the Women's Open title. The 2022 Open was organised with the help and support of the Tolosa Gaels GAA Club and the local Government.

== See also ==
- List of football stadiums in France
- Lists of stadiums
