= Toulouse-Saint-Cyprien-Arènes station =

Railway station in Toulouse, France

Saint-Cyprien Arènes
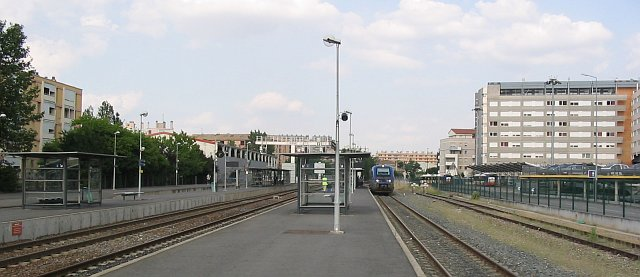
- Saint-Cyprien–Arènes railway station

General information
- Location: Toulouse, Haute-Garonne, Occitanie; France
- Coordinates: 43°35′38″N 01°25′02″E
- Operator: SNCF
- Line: Toulouse-Saint-Agne–Auch railway
- Platforms: 4
- Tracks: 5

Other information
- Station code: 87446179

History
- Rebuilt: 1993

Services
| Preceding station | TER Occitanie | Following station |
|---|---|---|
| Gallieni-Cancéropôle towards Toulouse | 16 | Le TOEC towards Auch |
Location

Toulouse Saint-Cyprien–Arènes is a railway station in Toulouse, Occitanie, France. The station is on the Toulouse-Saint-Agne–Auch railway. The train services are operated by SNCF.

== Location ==
The station is located in the Arènes district of Toulouse, on the Toulouse-Auch line.

== Train services ==
The station is served by TER Occitanie line 16 (Toulouse – Auch).

The station is served by the following services:

- Regional services (TER Occitanie) Toulouse – L'Isle-Jourdain – Auch
- Line C of Toulouse urban trains

== Public transport ==
The station is also served by metro line A, tram T1 and T2 and buses.
