= List of Toulouse Metro stations =

Current plan of the Toulouse Métro.

The following is the list of the Toulouse Metro stations in Toulouse, France.

== Line A ==
Line A of the Toulouse Metro opened in June 1993 and later extended from Jolimont to Balma-Gramont in 2002. It currently serves 18 stations distributed along 12.5 kilometres (7.8 mi).

- Balma-Gramont (terminus)
- Argoulets
- Roseraie
- Jolimont
- Marengo-SNCF (transfer: SNCF main station)
- Jean Jaurès (transfer: Metro B)
- Capitole
- Esquirol
- Saint Cyprien - République
- Patte-d'Oie
- Arènes (transfer: Tram T1, Line Arènes-Colomiers, SNCF station)
- Fontaine-Lestang
- Mermoz
- Bagatelle
- Mirail-Université
- Reynerie
- Bellefontaine
- Basso-Cambo (terminus)

The name of the Marengo-SNCF station will change to Matabiau Gare in order to accommodate the new name for line C station.

== Line B ==
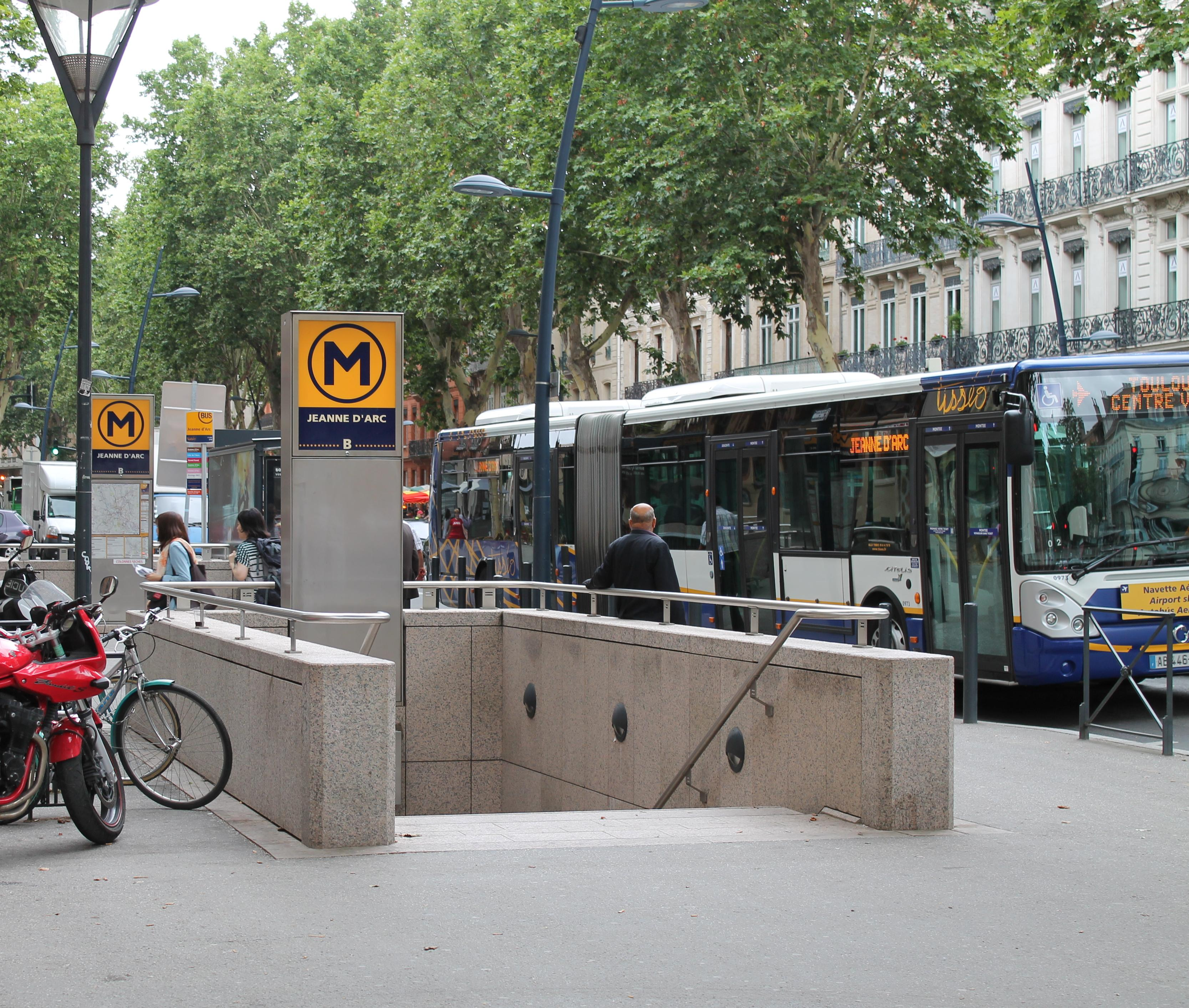
An entrance to Station Jeanne d'Arc

Line B of the Toulouse Metro opened on 30 June 2007. It currently serves 20 stations and has a route length of 15.7 kilometres (9.8 mi).

- Borderouge (terminus)
- Trois Cocus
- La Vache
- Barrière de Paris
- Minimes - Claude Nougaro
- Canal du Midi
- Compans-Caffarelli
- Jeanne d'Arc
- Jean Jaurès (transfer: Metro A)
- François Verdier
- Carmes
- Palais de Justice (transfer: Tram T1)
- Saint Michel - Marcel Langer
- Empalot
- Saint-Agne SNCF (transfer: SNCF station)
- Saouzelong
- Rangueil
- Faculté de Pharmacie
- Université Paul Sabatier
- Ramonville (terminus)

=== Labège extension of Line B (projected opening - 2027) ===
- Parc Technologique du Canal
- Labège Madron (transfer station for the future Line C)

== Line C (in construction) ==
Line C is currently in construction since 2022. It is expected to open in 2028. These are definitive names of the stations given by Tisséo but the name of some stations might change.

- Colomiers Gare (transfer station for Arènes-Colomiers line)
- Fontaine Lumineuse
- Saint-Martin-Du-Touch
- Blagnac (transfer station for line T1 and Aeroport Express)
- Sept Deniers - Stade Toulousain
- Ponts Jumeaux
- Fondeyre
- La Vache (transfer station for line B)
- Lycée Toulouse-Lautrec
- Raisin
- Bonnefoy
- Matabiau Gare (transfer station for line A, D and F)
- François Verdier (transfer station for line B)
- Côte Pavée
- Limayrac – Cité de l’Espace
- Ormeau
- Montaudran Gare
- Aerospace Campus
- Labège Madron (transfer station for line B)
- Diagora
- Labège Gare (transfer station for line F)

== See also ==
- List of metro systems
