= Toulouse-Saint-Agne station =

Railway station in Toulouse, France

Toulouse-Saint-Agne
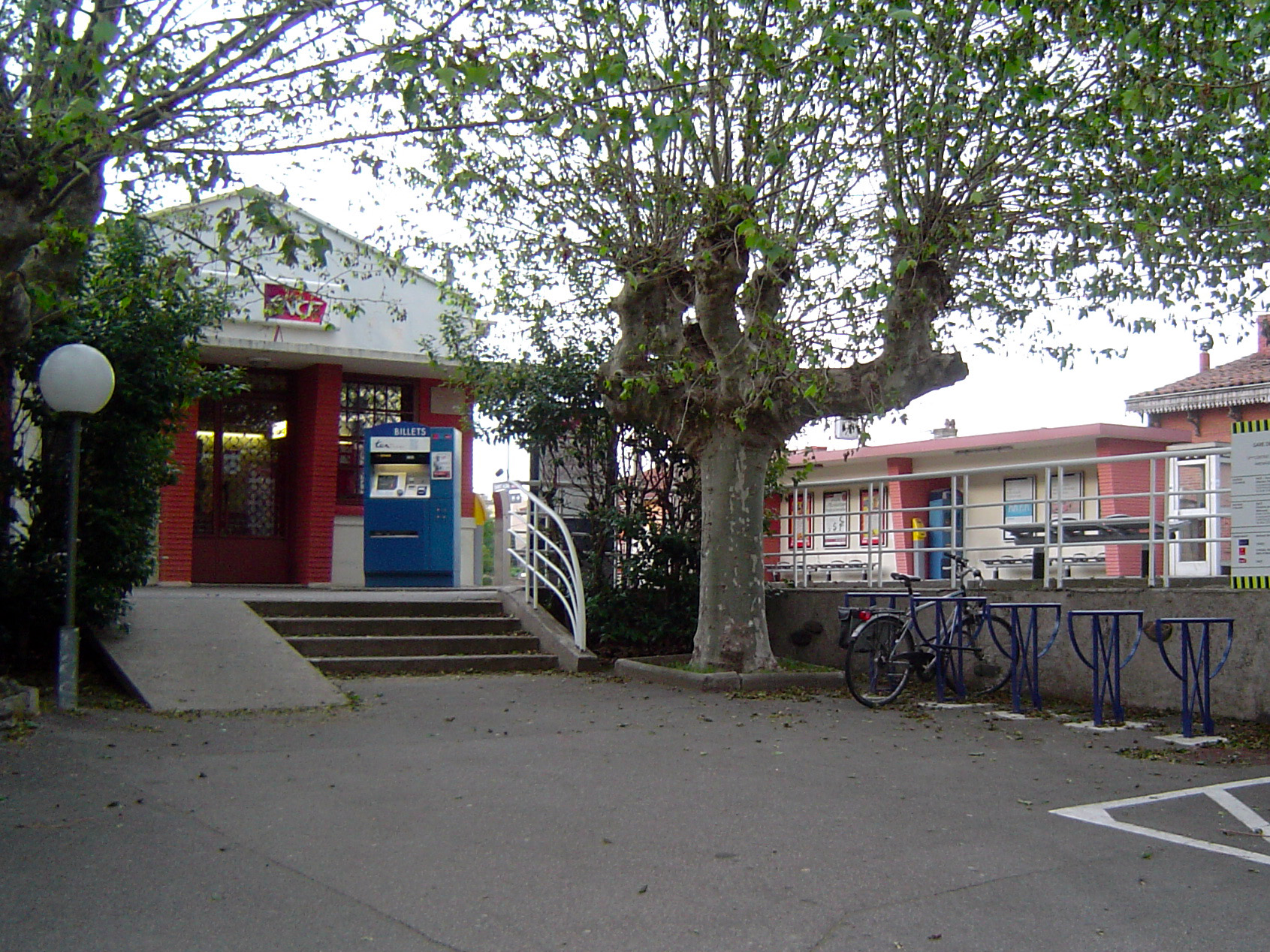
- Toulouse-Saint-Agne railway station

General information
- Location: Toulouse, Haute-Garonne, Occitanie, France
- Coordinates: 43°34′47″N 1°27′01″E
- Lines: Toulouse–Bayonne railway Toulouse-Saint-Agne–Auch railway
- Platforms: 2
- Tracks: 2

Other information
- Station code: 87611301

Passengers
- 2024: 1,054,146

Services
Preceding station	TER Occitanie	Following station
Toulouse-Matabiau towards Toulouse	11	Portet-Saint-Simon towards Latour-de-Carol
Portet-Saint-Simon towards Pau	15	Toulouse-Matabiau towards Toulouse
Toulouse-Matabiau towards Toulouse	16	Gallieni-Cancéropôle towards Auch
Location

Toulouse-Saint-Agne is a railway station in Toulouse, Occitanie, France. The station is located on the Toulouse–Bayonne and Toulouse–Saint-Agne–Auch railway. The station is served by TER (local) services operated by the SNCF.

== Train services ==
The following services currently call at Toulouse-Saint-Agne:

- local service (TER Occitanie) Toulouse–Colomiers–Auch
- local service (TER Occitanie) Toulouse–Foix–Latour-de-Carol-Enveitg
- local service (TER Occitanie) Toulouse–Saint-Gaudens–Tarbes–Pau

== Metro ==
Toulouse-Saint-Agne also lies on the Toulouse Metro network on line B which operates from Borderouge and Ramonville.

== Gallery ==
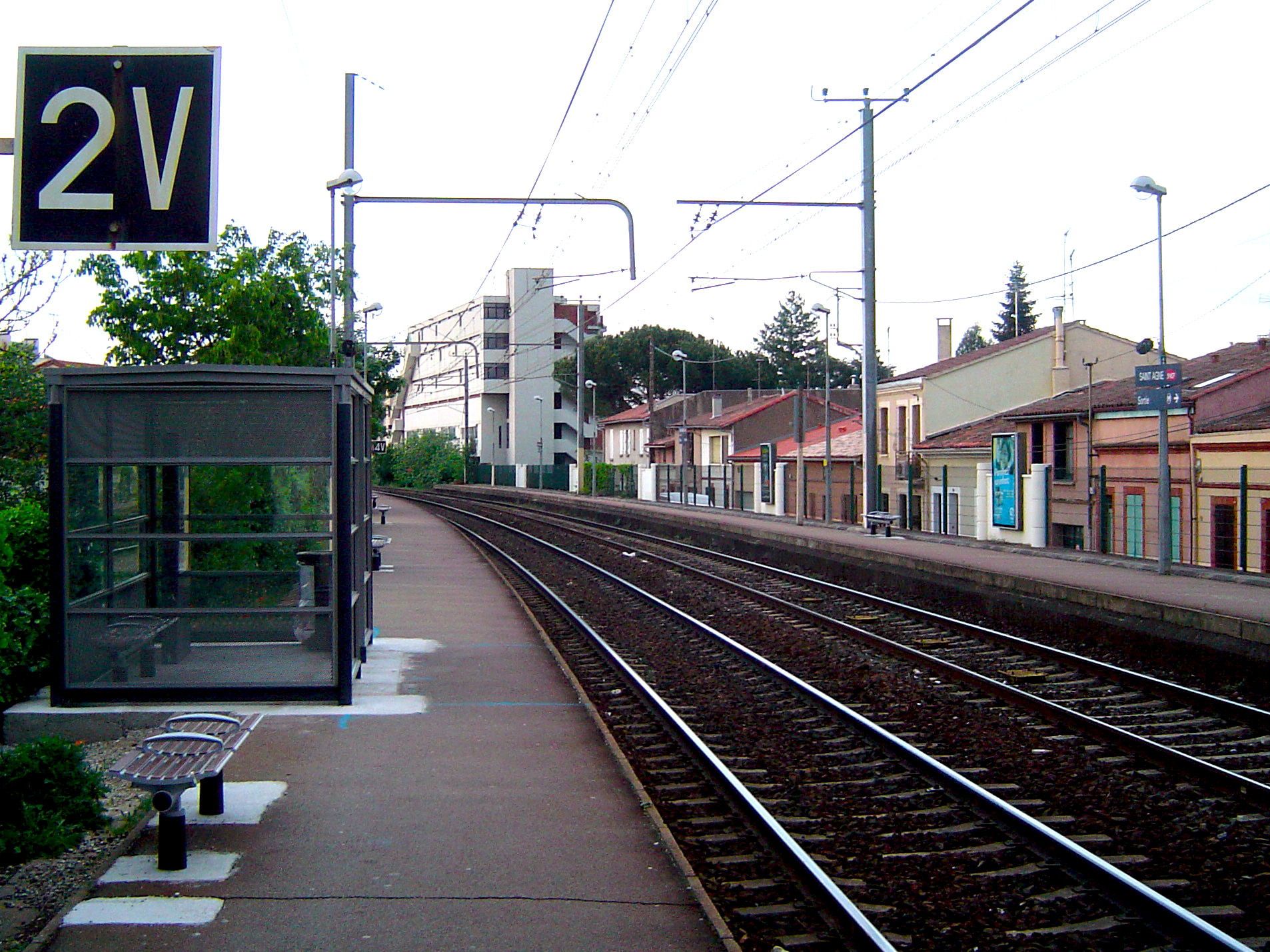
The station platforms

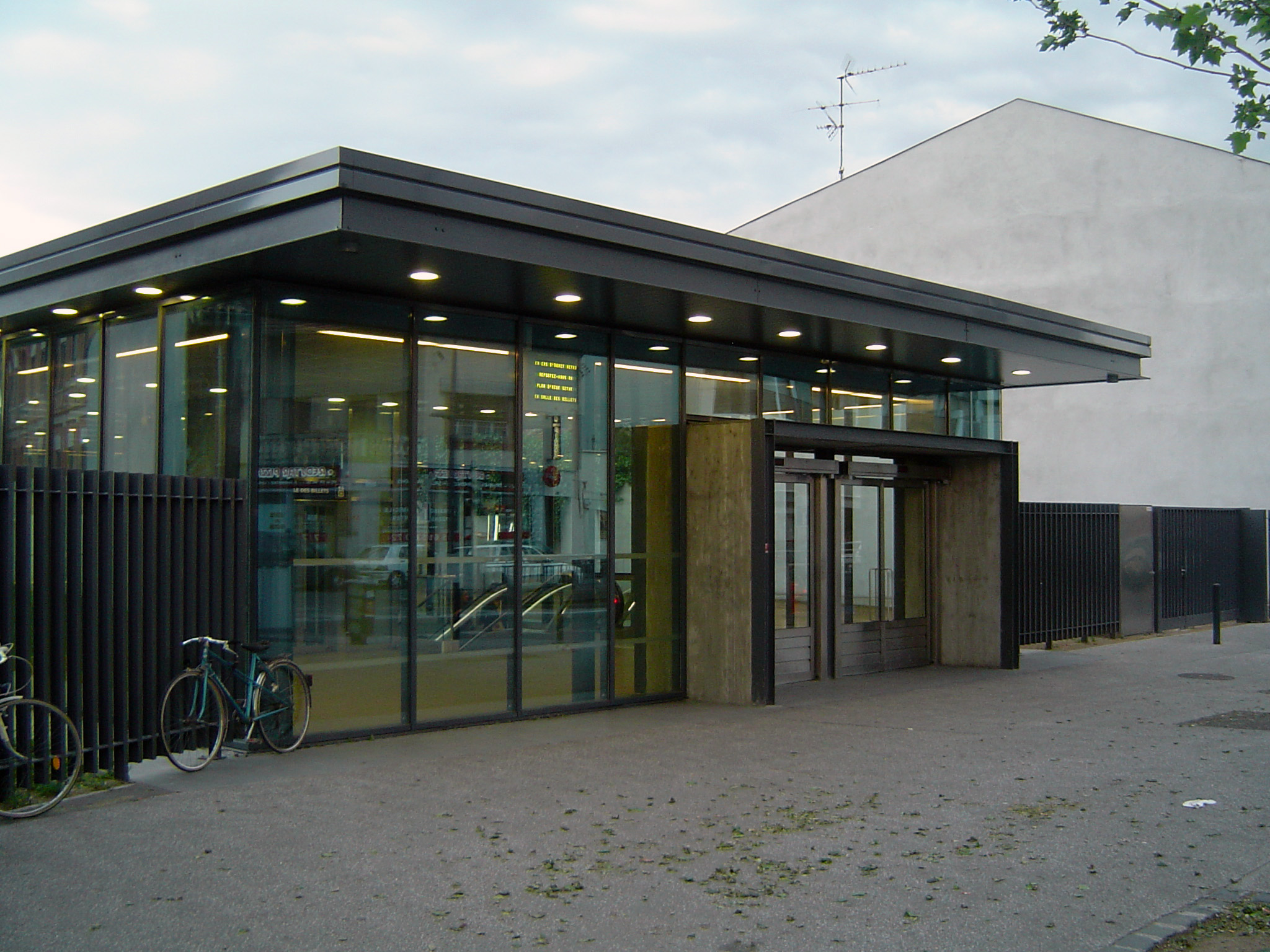
The entrance to the metro station

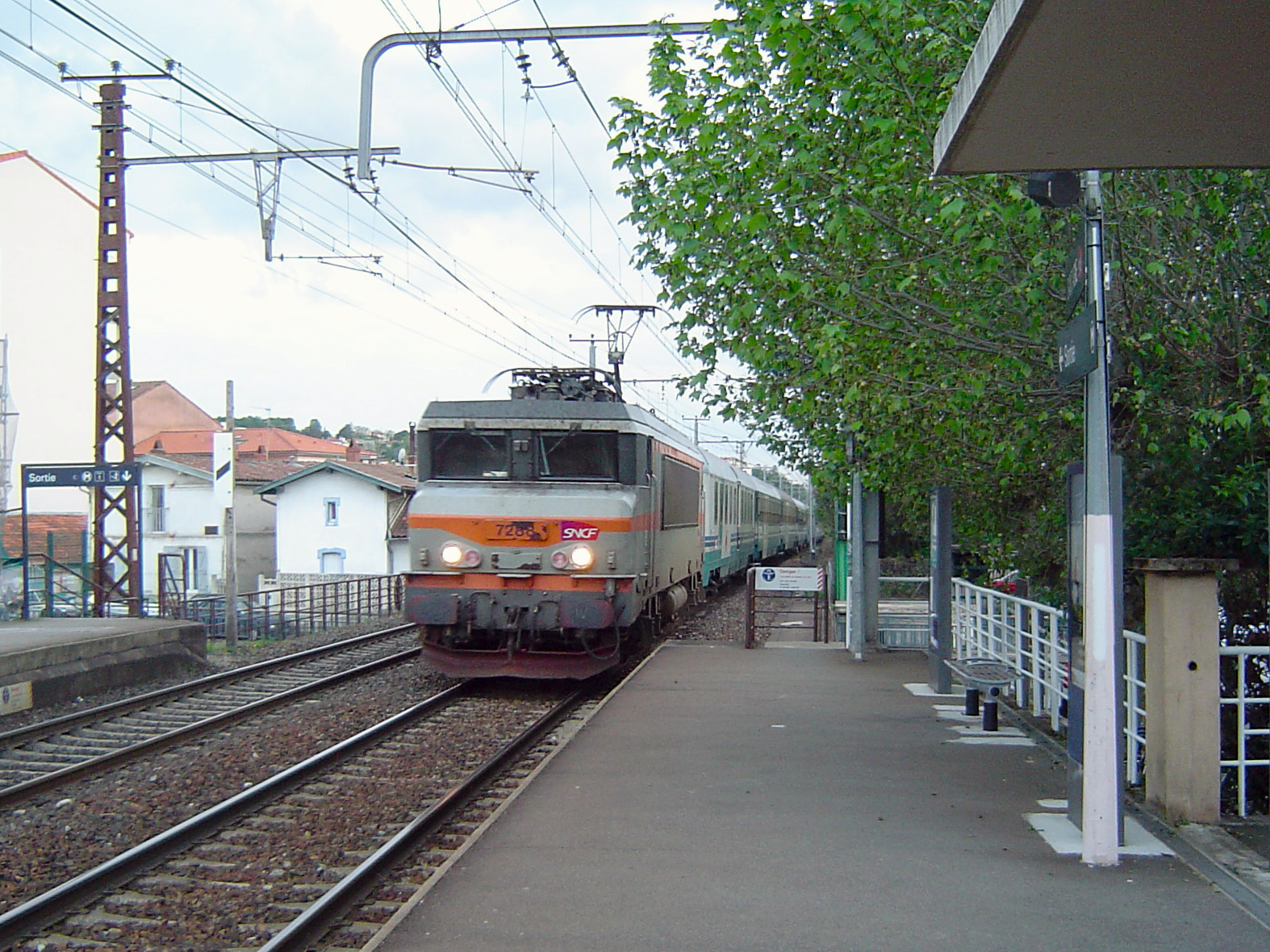
A train passing through the station
