= Venerque–le-Vernet station =

Railway station in Venerque, France

Venerque–le-Vernet
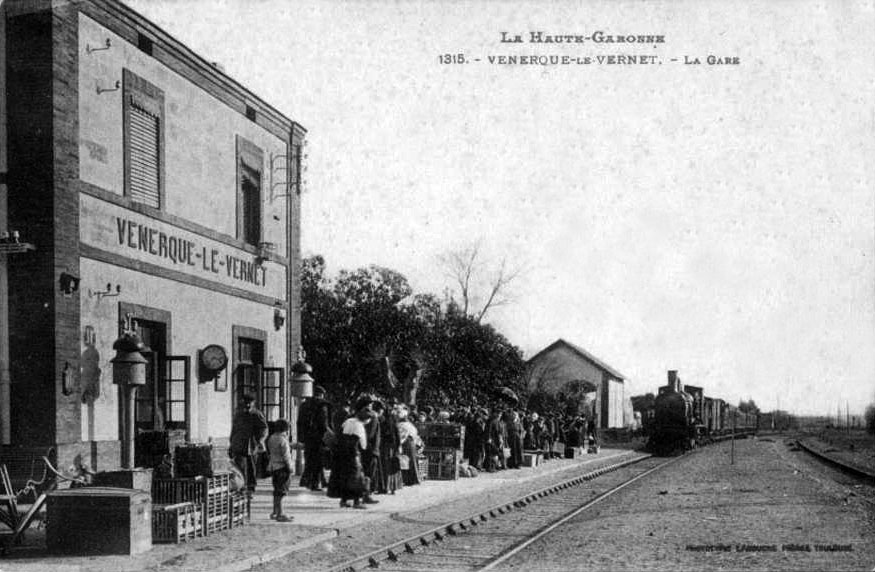
- Venerque-le-Vernet railway station

General information
- Location: Vernet, Haute-Garonne, Occitanie, France
- Coordinates: 43°26′00″N 1°25′33″E
- Line: Portet-Saint-Simon–Puigcerdà railway
- Platforms: 2
- Tracks: 2

Other information
- Station code: 87611392

History
- Opened: 19 October 1861

Services
Preceding station	TER Occitanie	Following station
Pins-Justaret towards Toulouse	11	Auterive towards Latour-de-Carol
Location

Venerque–le-Vernet is a railway station in Venerque and Vernet, Occitanie, France. The station is on the Portet-Saint-Simon–Puigcerdà railway. The station is served by TER (local) services operated by the SNCF.

== Train services ==
The following services currently call at Venerque-le-Vernet:

- local service (TER Occitanie) Toulouse–Foix–Latour-de-Carol-Enveitg
