= Pins-Justaret =

- Commune
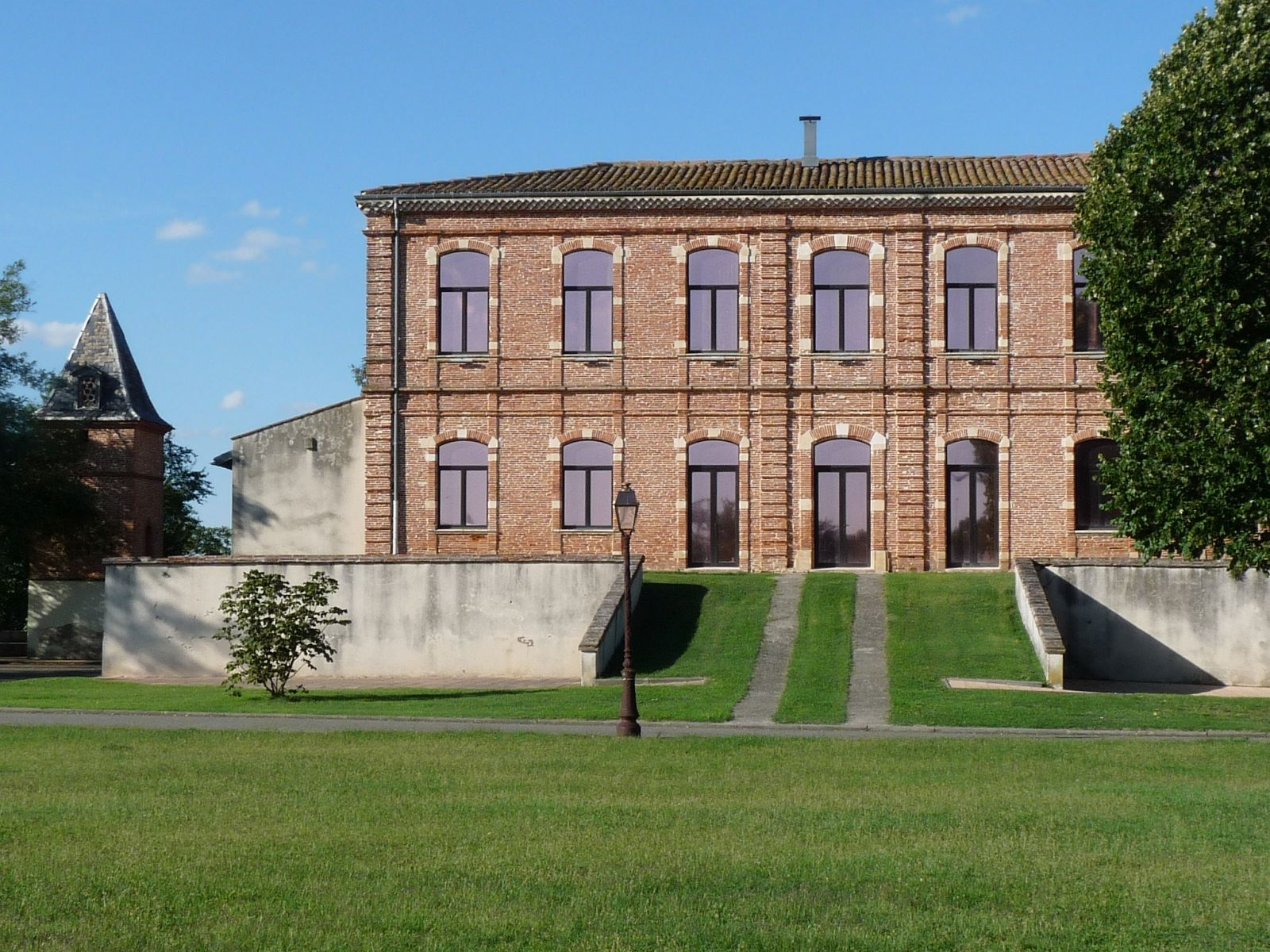
- The town hall in Pins-Justaret

- Coat of arms
- Location of Pins-Justaret
- Location within France Location within Occitanie
- Coordinates: 43°28′51″N 1°23′02″E
- Country: France
- Region: Occitania
- Department: Haute-Garonne
- Arrondissement: Muret
- Canton: Portet-sur-Garonne
- Intercommunality: Le Muretain Agglo

Government
  - Mayor (2020–2026): Philippe Guerriot
- Area^{1}: 4.51 km^{2} (1.74 sq mi)
- Elevation: 159 m (522 ft)
- Highest elevation: 167 m (548 ft)
- Lowest elevation: 146 m (479 ft)
- Population (2023): 4,378
  - Density: 971/km^{2} (2,510/sq mi)
- Time zone: UTC+01:00 (CET)
  - Summer (DST): UTC+02:00 (CEST)
- INSEE/Postal code: 31421 /31860
- ^{1} French Land Register data, which excludes lakes, ponds, glaciers > 1 km^{2} (0.386 sq mi or 247 acres) and river estuaries.

Pins-Justaret (French pronunciation: [pɛ̃ ʒystaʁɛ]; Occitan: Pins e Justaret) is a commune in the Haute-Garonne department in southwestern France. Pins-Justaret station has rail connections to Toulouse, Foix and Latour-de-Carol.

== Population ==
The inhabitants of the commune are known as Pins-Justarétois or Pins-Justarétoises in French.

Historical population
Year	Pop.	±% p.a.
1968	577	—
1975	998	+8.14%
1982	2,021	+10.61%
1990	3,303	+6.33%
1999	3,915	+1.91%
2007	4,342	+1.30%
2012	4,541	+0.90%
2017	4,410	−0.58%
2023	4,378	−0.12%
Source: INSEE

== Twin towns ==
Pins-Justaret is twinned with:

- Cordignano, Italy, since 2004

== See also ==
- Communes of the Haute-Garonne department
