= Beauzelle =

- Commune
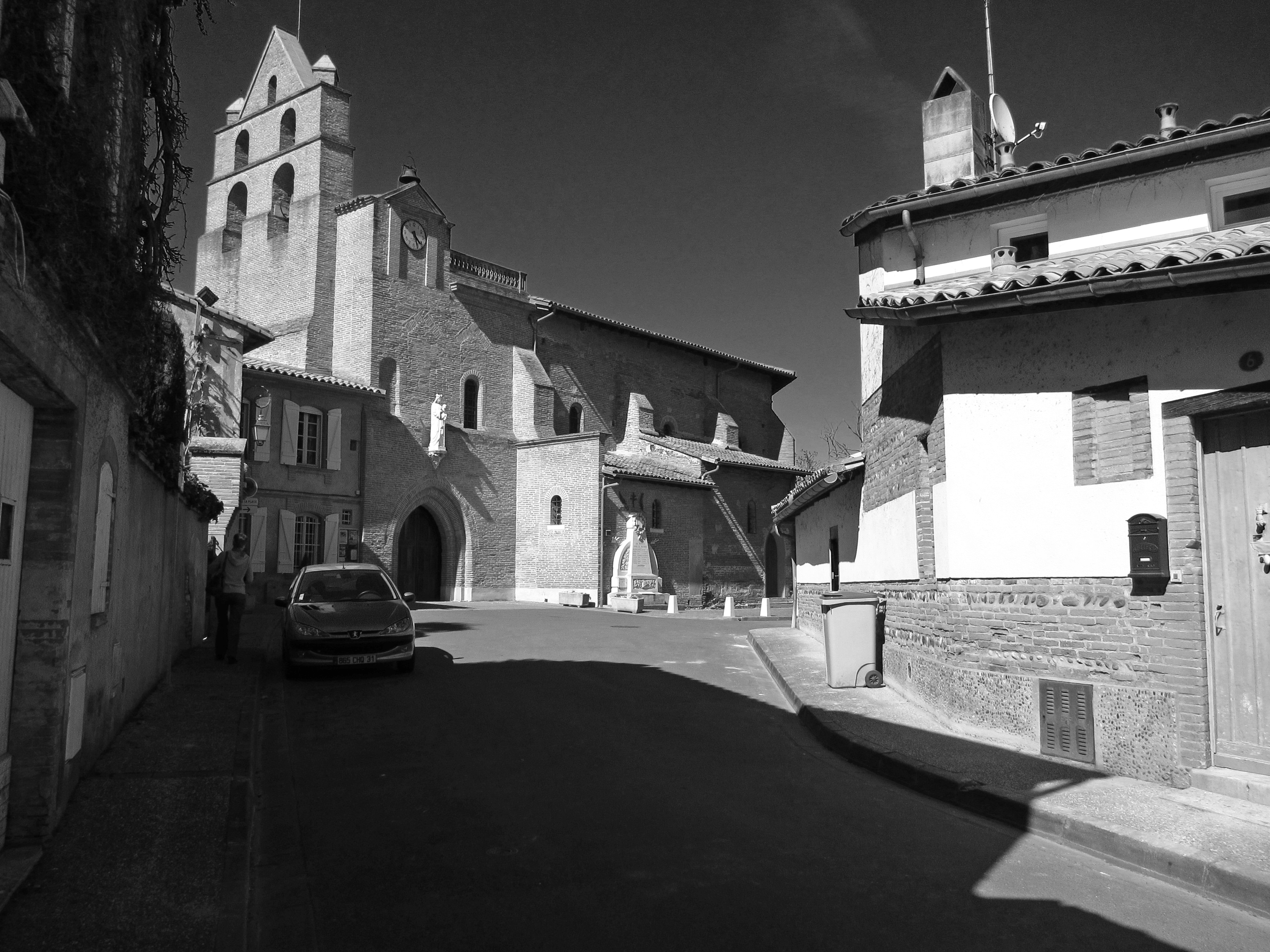
- The church in Beauzelle

- Coat of arms
- Location of Beauzelle
- Location within France Location within Occitanie
- Coordinates: 43°39′59″N 1°22′42″E
- Country: France
- Region: Occitania
- Department: Haute-Garonne
- Arrondissement: Toulouse
- Canton: Blagnac
- Intercommunality: Toulouse Métropole

Government
  - Mayor (2020–2026): Patrice Rodrigues
- Area^{1}: 4.42 km^{2} (1.71 sq mi)
- Elevation: 125 m (410 ft)
- Highest elevation: 145 m (476 ft)
- Lowest elevation: 115 m (377 ft)
- Population (2023): 8,713
  - Density: 1,970/km^{2} (5,110/sq mi)
- Time zone: UTC+01:00 (CET)
  - Summer (DST): UTC+02:00 (CEST)
- INSEE/Postal code: 31056 /31700
- ^{1} French Land Register data, which excludes lakes, ponds, glaciers > 1 km^{2} (0.386 sq mi or 247 acres) and river estuaries.

Beauzelle (French pronunciation: [bozɛl]; Occitan: Bausèla) is a commune in the Haute-Garonne department in southwestern France.

== Population ==
Historical population
Year	Pop.	±% p.a.
1968	623	—
1975	2,736	+23.54%
1982	3,573	+3.89%
1990	5,405	+5.31%
1999	5,376	−0.06%
2007	4,914	−1.12%
2012	5,480	+2.20%
2017	6,387	+3.11%
2023	8,713	+5.31%
Source: INSEE

== See also ==
- Communes of the Haute-Garonne department
- Beauzac
- Beauziac
