= Portet-Saint-Simon station =

Railway station in Occitanie, France

Portet-Saint-Simon
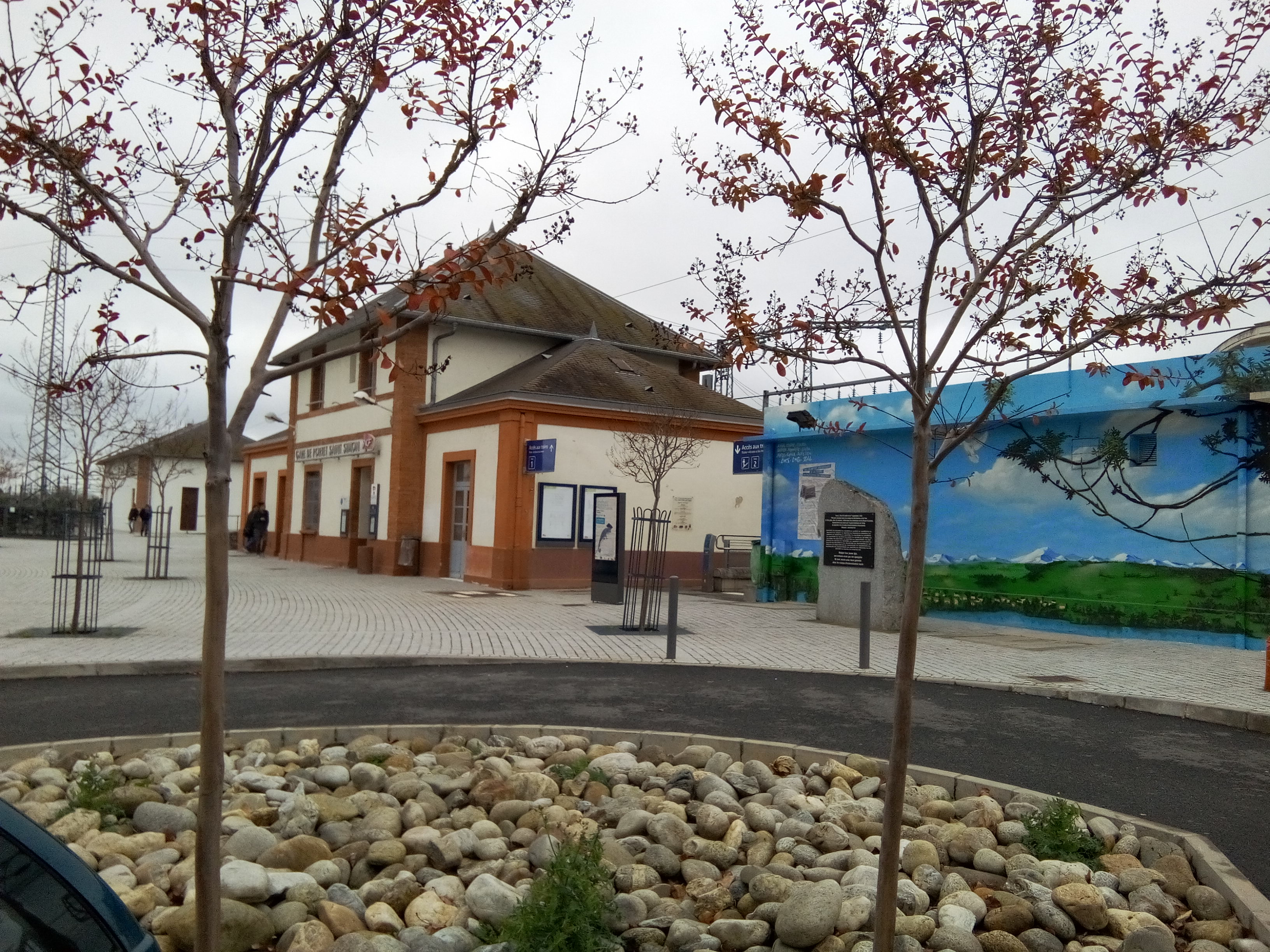
- Portet-Saint-Simon railway station

General information
- Location: Portet-sur-Garonne, Haute-Garonne, Occitanie, France
- Coordinates: 43°31′40″N 1°23′20″E
- Lines: Toulouse–Bayonne railway Portet-Saint-Simon–Puigcerdà railway
- Platforms: 3
- Tracks: 4

Other information
- Station code: 87611400

History
- Opened: 19 October 1861

Services
Preceding station	TER Occitanie	Following station
Toulouse-Saint-Agne towards Toulouse	11	Pins-Justaret towards Latour-de-Carol
Muret towards Pau	15	Toulouse-Saint-Agne towards Toulouse
Location

Portet-Saint-Simon is a railway station in Portet-sur-Garonne, Occitanie, France. The station is on the Toulouse-Bayonne railway and Portet-Saint-Simon–Puigcerdà railway. The station is served by TER (local) services operated by the SNCF.

== Train services ==
The following services currently call at Portet-Saint-Simon:

- local service (TER Occitanie) Toulouse–Foix–Latour-de-Carol-Enveitg
- local service (TER Occitanie) Toulouse–Saint-Gaudens–Tarbes–Pau
