= Gallieni-Cancéropôle station =

Railway station in France

Gallieni-Cancéropôle
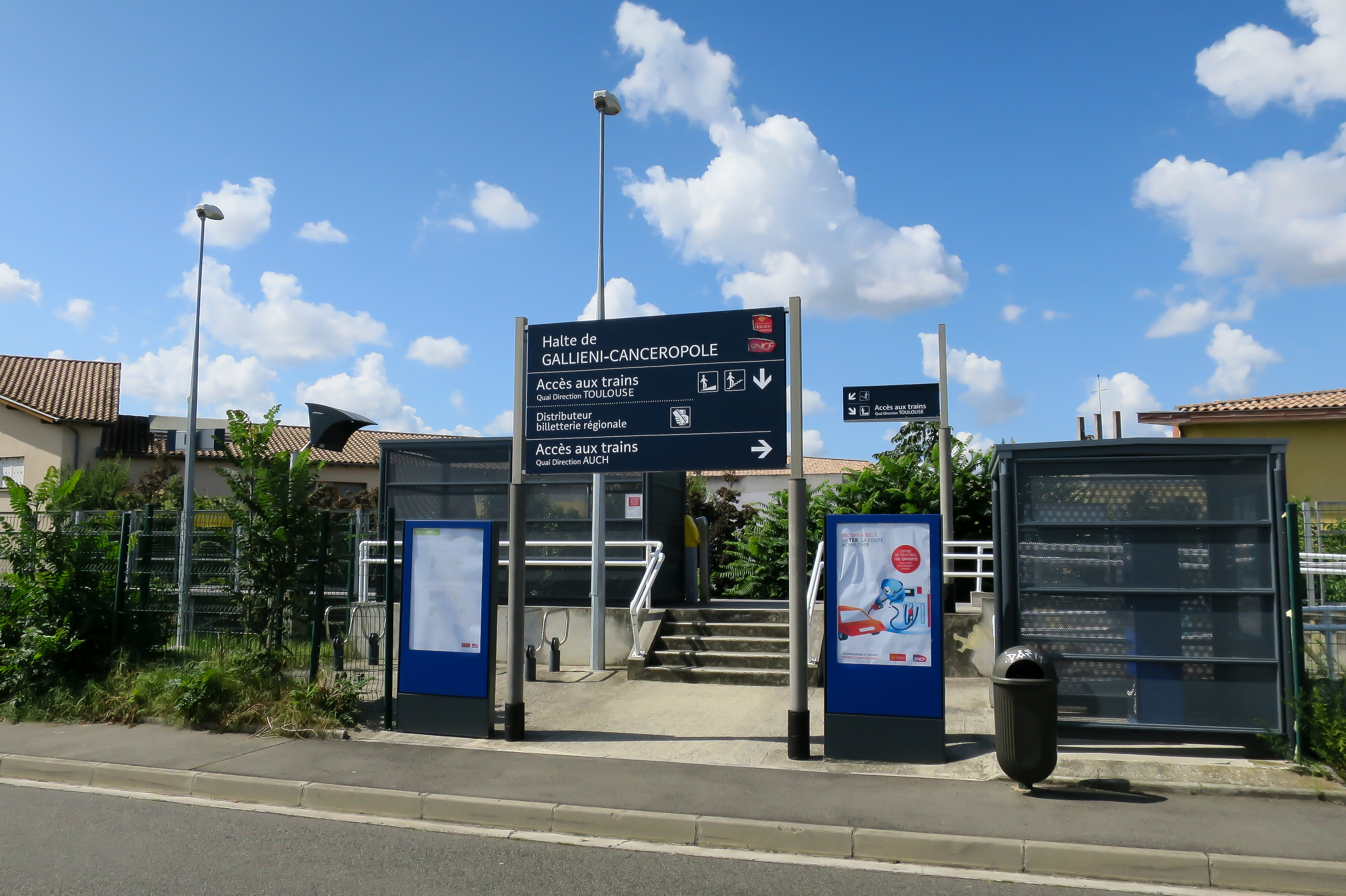
- Gallieni-Cancéropôle railway station

General information
- Location: Toulouse, Haute-Garonne, Occitanie; France
- Coordinates: 43°34′27″N 01°25′11″E
- Operator: SNCF
- Line: Toulouse-Saint-Agne–Auch railway
- Platforms: 2
- Tracks: 1

Other information
- Station code: 87497461

History
- Opened: 13 December 2009; 16 years ago

Services
Preceding station	TER Occitanie	Following station
Toulouse-Saint-Agne towards Toulouse	16	Toulouse-Saint-Cyprien-Arènes towards Auch
Location

Gallieni-Cancéropôle is a railway station in Toulouse, Occitanie, France. The station opened on 13 December 2009 and is on the Toulouse-Saint-Agne–Auch railway. The train services are operated by SNCF.

== Location ==
The station is located on the Toulouse-Auch railway, in the Croix de Pierre district of Toulouse. It serves the Gallieni High School and the Toulouse Cancer Institute.

The station has two platforms, one either side of a level crossing.

== Train services ==
The station is served by the following services:

- Regional services (TER Occitanie) Toulouse – Colomiers – L'Isle-Jourdain – Auch
