= Pins-Justaret station =

Railway station in Pins-Justaret, France

Pins-Justaret
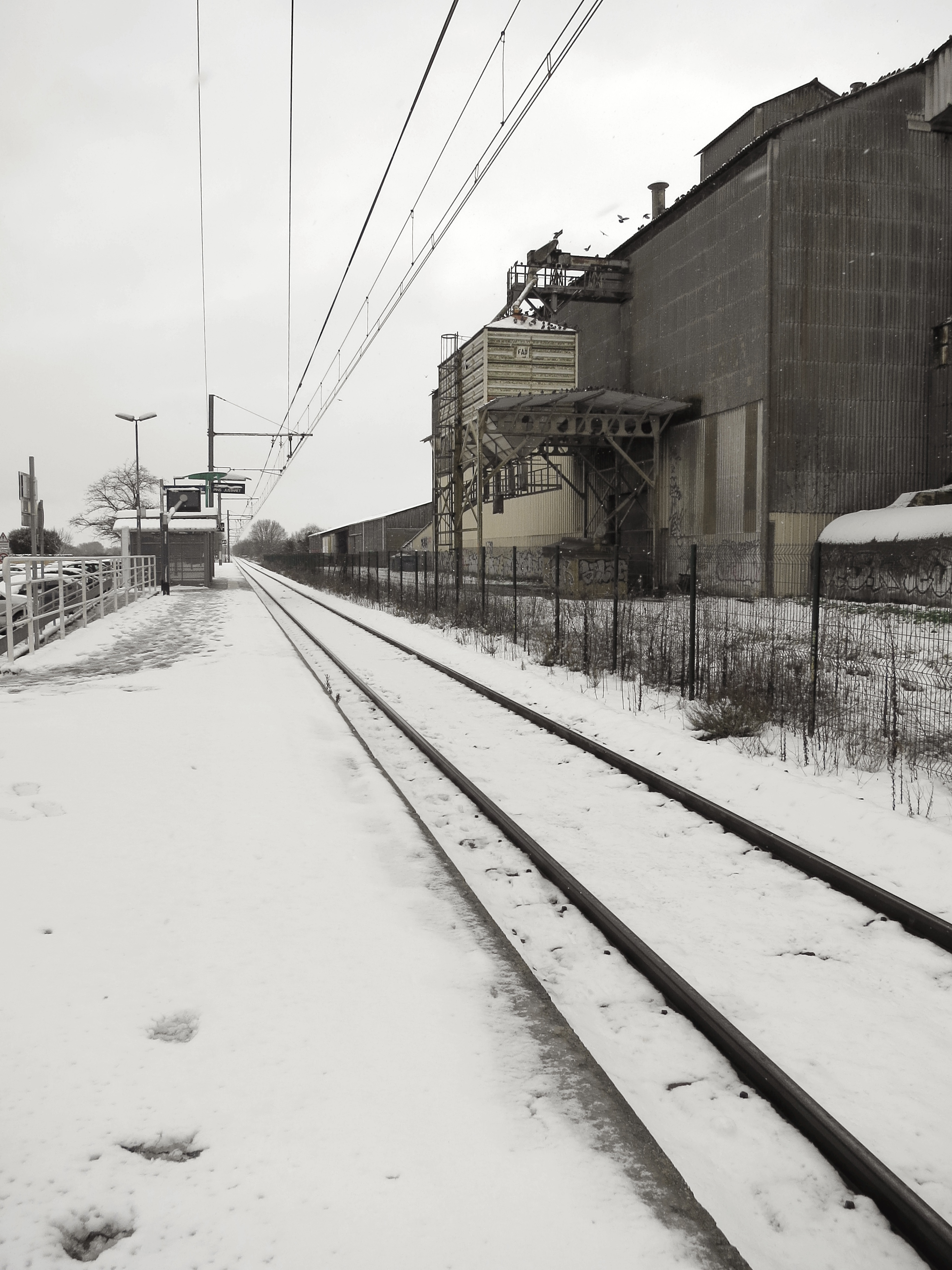
- Pins-Justaret railway station

General information
- Location: Pins-Justaret, Haute-Garonne, Occitanie, France
- Coordinates: 43°28′45″N 1°23′59″E
- Line: Portet-Saint-Simon–Puigcerdà railway
- Platforms: 1
- Tracks: 1

Other information
- Station code: 87618116

History
- Opened: 19 October 1861

Services
Preceding station	TER Occitanie	Following station
Portet-Saint-Simon towards Toulouse	11	Venerque-le-Vernet towards Latour-de-Carol
Location

Pins-Justaret is a railway station in Pins-Justaret, Occitanie, France. The station is on the Portet-Saint-Simon–Puigcerdà railway. The station is served by TER (local) services operated by the SNCF.

== Train services ==
The following services currently call at Pins-Justaret:

- local service (TER Occitanie) Toulouse–Foix–Latour-de-Carol-Enveitg
