= LGV Bordeaux–Toulouse =

Future French high-speed railway

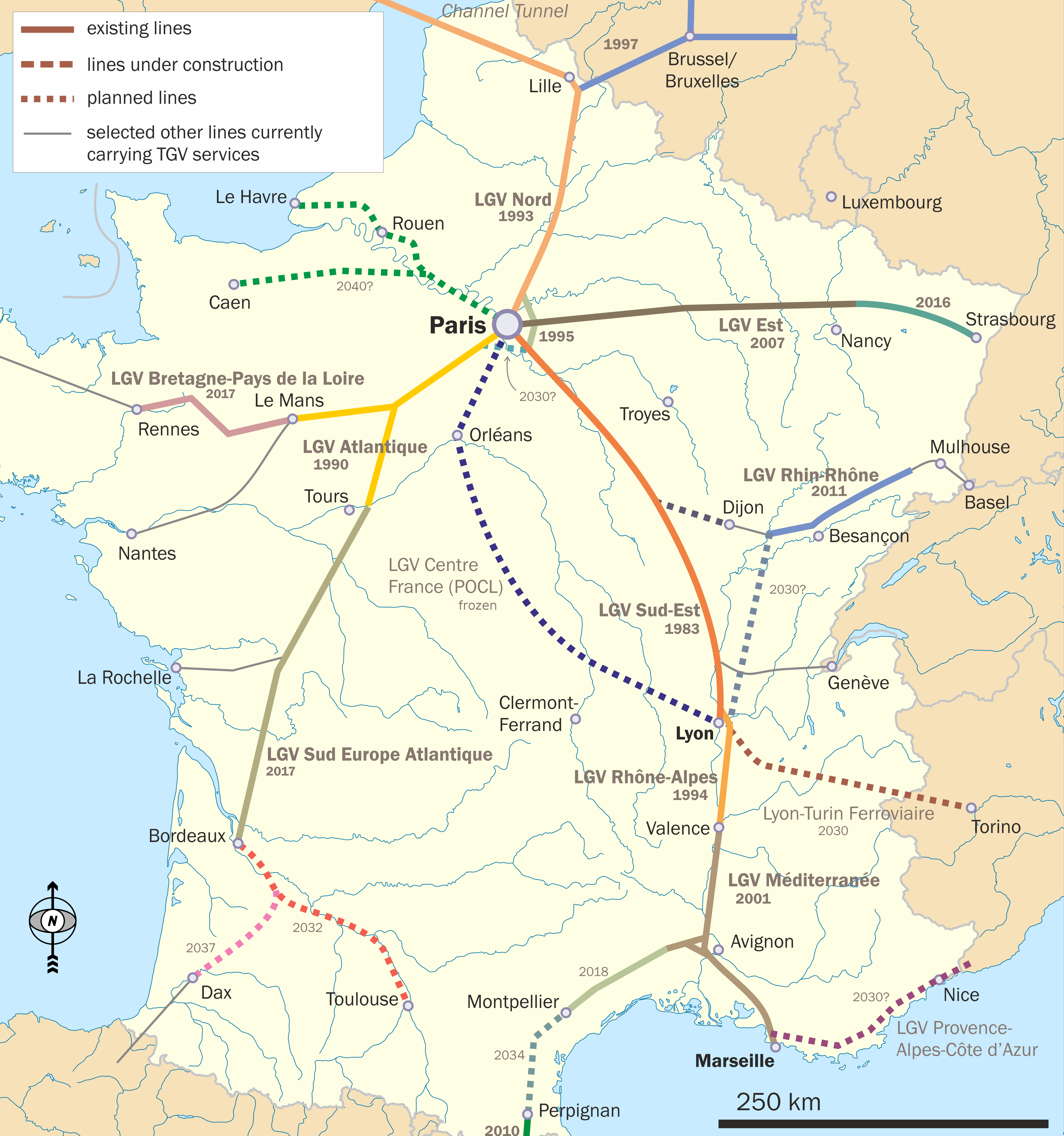
French TGV network, with the planned high-speed line from Bordeaux to Toulouse in the southwest (red dots)

The LGV Bordeaux–Toulouse is a 222 kilometre (138 mi) long future French high-speed rail line reserved for passenger traffic between Bordeaux and Toulouse. Its dual aim is:

- to ensure high-speed service of the Toulouse region through an extension of the LGV Sud Europe Atlantique and reduce the journey time between Paris and Toulouse to slightly over 3 hours.
- in a more distant and less defined future, to be part of a proposed "Southern Link", connecting the Atlantic and Mediterranean from Bordeaux to Nice via Toulouse, Montpellier and Marseille.

As of 2024, preliminary construction works started and the line is expected to be finished in 2032.

== Features ==
The project was the subject of preliminary studies between 2002 and 2004 by RFF. These proposed:

- serving Bordeaux and Toulouse through their existing central stations (Bordeaux St-Jean and Toulouse Matabiau)
- stops at Agen and Montauban, either through their existing stations, or by the creation of new stations on the high-speed line.
- a route between Agen and Toulouse following the Garonne valley and the A62 autoroute.
- three route options between Bordeaux and Agen: to the north of the Garonne valley; running along the valley; to the south, passing by Captieux. This third option, currently favoured, would permit a common first section between the LGV Bordeaux–Toulouse and the extension of the LGV Sud Europe Atlantique from Bordeaux via Dax to the Spanish border. Additionally, it would permit calling directly at Mont-de-Marsan and would offer direct access to the towns of the Pyrenees area (Pau, Lourdes, Tarbes).

Short term plans do not include a bypass of the Bordeaux area; TGVs providing the Paris-Toulouse service would go through the Bordeaux St-Jean station. The line would begin Southwest of Bordeaux at Hourcade and rejoin the existing network Northwest of Toulouse at St-Jory. The Bordeaux shunt project (Libourne-La Réole) seems somewhat incompatible with the common section option.

Line speed will be 320 km/h, enabling a journey time of 59 minutes between Bordeaux and Toulouse, and of 3:14 between Paris and Toulouse (3:07 without a stop at Bordeaux).

Service is planned to begin around 2032, for a cost of approximately 10 to 14 billions euros.

== Progress ==
The public inquiry into the project ended 25 November 2005. This revealed:

- some opposition from the southern Gironde area and particularly the Captieux region, where residents who will benefit little from the line feared the destruction of natural sites and preferred an upgrade of the existing line. The delegates from Aquitaine prioritized the extension of the LGV Sud Europe Atlantique to the Spanish border over this link to Toulouse.

On 13 April 2006, the RFF administrative committee decided to continue its studies, taking into account the conclusions of the public inquiry. It agreed on a new station to serve Montauban, and deferred to more detailed studies the choice between building a new station for Agen or upgrading the existing station. The different options between Bordeaux and Agen were to be thoroughly investigated to determine the route after the public inquiry on the LGV Sud Europe Atlantique line is completed.

The French Government unveiled on 30 April 2008 the first of three draft laws which grant it the right to purchase land through eminent domain and actively seek bidders to build the LGV Bordeaux–Toulouse line. Funding for the line would have come as part of a massive programme of expansion of High Speed Lines in France, totalling 2,000 km of additional high-speed rail by 2020. That program was later descoped in the face of budgetary difficulties, but the Bordeaux–Toulouse line seemed likely to survive but unlikely to be constructed before 2030.

In April 2021, Prime Minister Jean Castex announced €4.1 billion in French government funding, slightly over half the estimated total cost of the project. The European Union was expected to contribute €1.5-€2 billion toward the project, and the Occitanie region around €1 billion. Preliminary construction started in 2024, and service is expected to begin by 2032. The various funding stakeholders reached a binding financial agreement in February 2022.

The report from the investigative commission on the AFSBs, released in August 2024, highlights an overwhelming public rejection, with nearly 90% of participants expressing a highly unfavorable opinion of the line.

Opposition main arguments are :

- prioritise the TER lines,
- modernise the current Bordeaux–Toulouse connection, a less expensive project, but which would not save as much time as the HSL,
- protect natural, agricultural and wine-growing areas
- the noise and visual nuisances for local residents
- the construction site would generate 4.5 million tonnes of CO2 equivalent, which would make the project carbon-unprofitable.
- democratic and constitutional issues: wide popular opposition to the project not taken into account. and taxation of people who will not benefit from the project
- Gentrification issue: in Bordeaux and Toulouse, real-estate prices will probably increase as a result of this project, making housing access even more difficult for current residents

== See also ==
- TGV
- LGV Sud Europe Atlantique
