= Toulouse Metro =

Rapid-transit railway in Toulouse, France

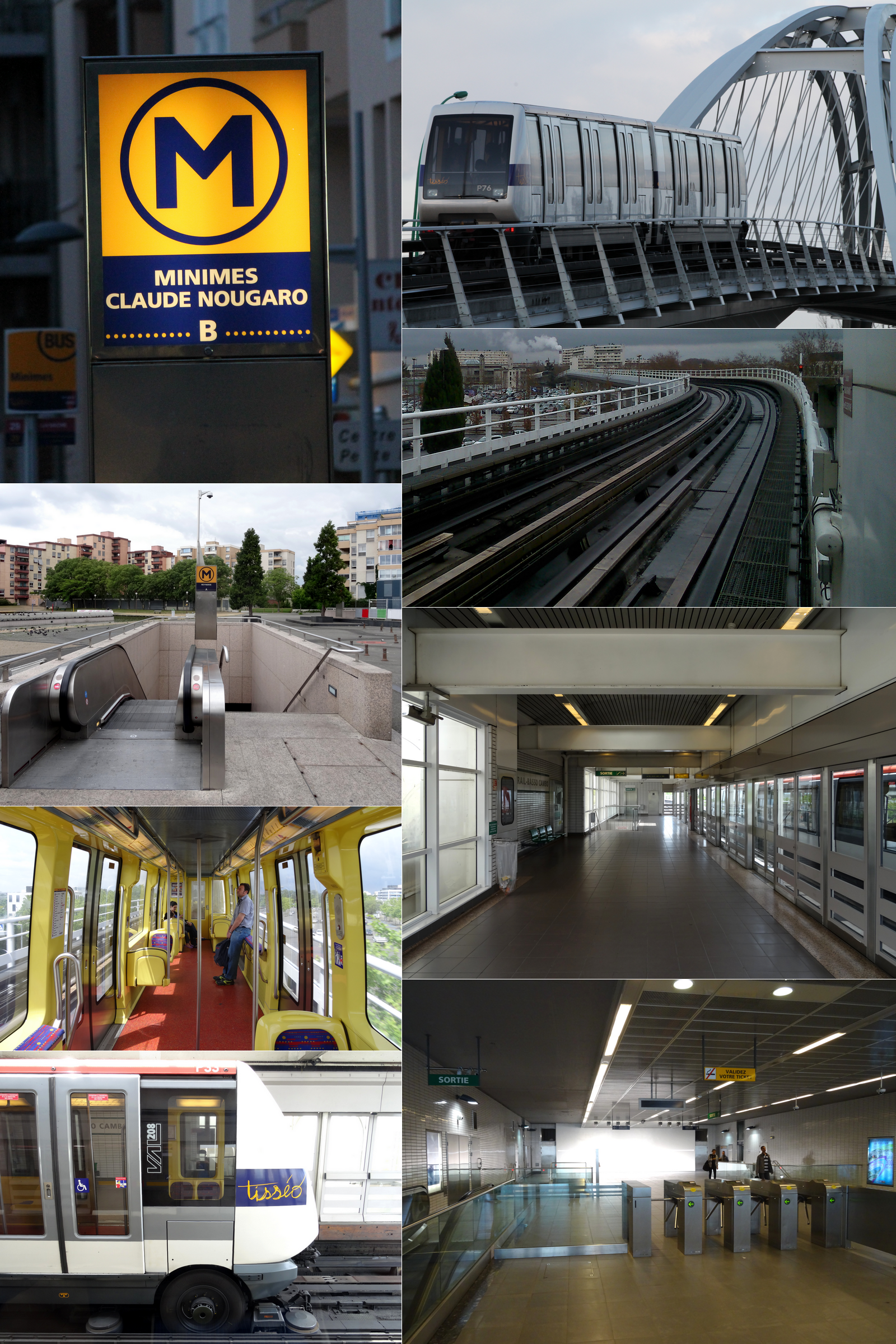

Overview
- Native name: Métro de Toulouse
- Locale: Toulouse Métropole, France
- Transit type: Rapid transit
- Number of lines: 2
- Number of stations: 38
- Daily ridership: Line A: 214,000 (2023); Line B: 215,000 (2023)
- Annual ridership: 112.9 million (2023)
- Website: www.tisseo.fr

Operation
- Began operation: June 26, 1993; 33 years ago
- Operator: Tisséo

Technical
- System length: 28.2 km (17.5 mi)
- Electrification: 750 V DC third rail
System map

The Toulouse Metro (French: Métro de Toulouse, Occitan: Mètro de Tolosa) is a rapid transit system serving Toulouse Métropole, France. It is the only metro system in Occitania. The city's public transport system was initially managed by the Société d'économie mixte des voyageurs de l'agglomération toulousaine (SEMVAT; literally the Toulouse Passengers' Mixed Economy Company), which was a company 80% owned by local government bodies and 20% privately owned. It has been managed by Tisséo Voyageurs, under the authority of Tisséo Collectivités, also named the Syndicat Mixte des Transports en Commun, an authority established by various local government bodies, since 2003.

In 2018, the network was used by 110.3 million passengers. The Toulouse Metro consists of two primarily-underground metro lines, Line A and Line B, which together serve 37 stations and comprise 28.2 kilometres (17.5 mi) of route. It is supplemented by the Toulouse railway network (including suburban Line Arènes-Colomiers (formerly Line C, the name was changed to avoid confusion with the future metro line), Line D and Line F), the Toulouse tramway (Line T1 and T2, formerly Line E, which serve the northwestern suburbs and Toulouse–Blagnac Airport) and Téléo, an urban Tricable gondola line in the south of the city.

== History ==
- 1983: City Council decides to create a metro line on a south-western/north-eastern axis.
- 1985: the municipality decides to use VAL technology.
- 1987: the project receives planning and environmental approvals.
- 1989: beginning of work on Line A.
- 1993: opening of Line A (Basso Cambo - Jolimont).
- 1997: beginning of preliminary studies for the extension of Line A and the construction of Line B.
- 2001: beginning of work on extension of Line A and construction of Line B.
- December 2003: Opening of the extension of line A to Balma-Gramont.
- 30 June 2007: Opening of Line B, (Borderouge - Ramonville).
- 2010: Tram Line T1 opens from Arènes to Aéroconstellation.
- 2013: Opening of the extension of Line T1 to Palais de Justice
- 2015: Opening of Line T2 from Palais de Justice to Aéroport Toulouse-Blagnac.
- May 2022: Opening of Téléo line
- December 2022: beginning of work on construction of Line C
- June 2023: Tram Line T2 closes due to construction works.
- 2026: Planned start of operations of the Toulouse Aéroport Express tramway line, effectively replacing line T2.
- 2028: Planned start of operations of the Line C (third metro line)

== Network ==
The Toulouse Metro is currently composed of two lines:

- Line A (12.5 km (7.8 mi)), Basso-Cambo - Balma Gramont. Opened in 1993, it is mainly underground, but comprises some elevated sections.
- Line B (15.7 km (9.8 mi)), Borderouge - Ramonville. On a north–south axis, entirely underground and which opened on 30 June 2007.

== Lines ==
=== Metro: Line A ===
The 18 stations of the A line.

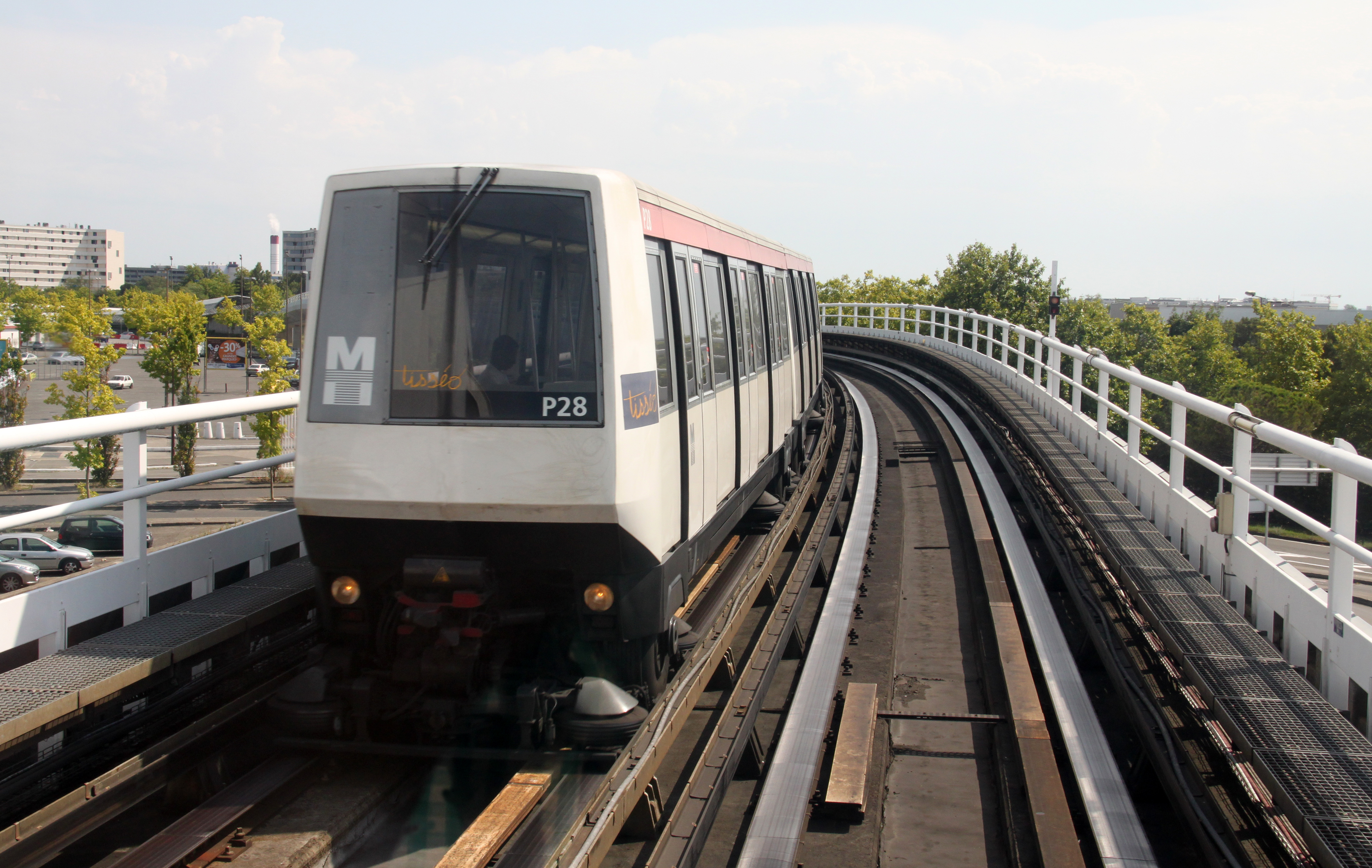
A VAL 206 metro typically found on Line A.

Line A comprises 18 stations on a 12.5-kilometre (7.8 mi) route. The original section of Line A opened in June 1993; an extension from Jolimont to Balma-Gramont opened in 2002. It extends from the shopping centre of Balma through Toulouse with stations at Marengo (connecting with the main SNCF railway station), Capitole, Place Esquirol and University of Mirail. After its final station, Basso-Cambo, is a carriage shed-workshop, which provides storage, maintenance and tests of the rolling stock for the whole of network. The Central Control Centre is also located at the garage-workshop. Its operating hours are 05:15 AM to midnight (Sunday to Thursday), and until 03:00 AM (Friday and Saturday).

Initially, in order to reduce costs, five of the 18 stations had shorter platforms. That meant that only two-carriage trains could be used for the entire line. As a result, 13 years after its opening the line was saturated - peak hours lasted longer and longer, and the opening of Line B (2007), Line E (2009) and various exclusive bus lanes brought in additional traffic flows on to Line A. The short platforms were lengthened from 2015 to 2019 and longer four carriage trains serve the whole line since early 2020, essentially doubling the capacity.

=== Metro: Line B ===
The 20 stations of the B line.

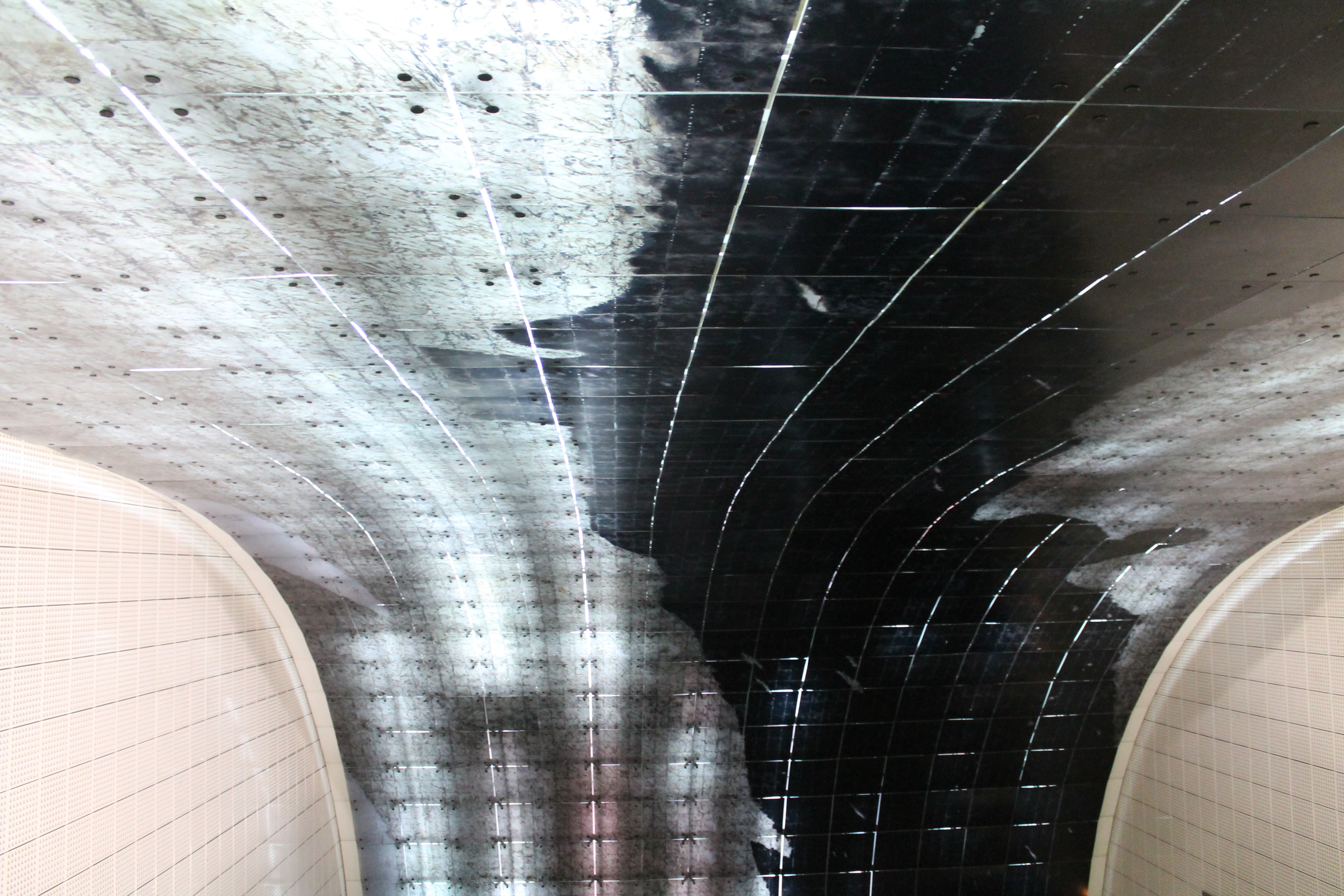
In Toulouse's metro system, there is a work of art in each station. Here is the vault of the Carmes station ceiling.

This line comprises 20 stations on a 15.7 kilometres (9.8 mi) route. It opened on 30 June 2007. Car parks have been built at Borderouge, and Ramonville stations. New bus stations have been built Borderouge, Université Paul Sabatier and Ramonville stations.

In January 2006, the Mayor of Toulouse, Jean-Luc Moudenc called for a fast decision on a southern extension of Line B. This extension would include 2.5 km (1.6 mi) of line on viaduct, with a crossing of the Canal du Midi and the A61 autoroute, four stations and would terminate at Labège - Innopole. It would cost €330 million and be opened in 2019. This project has been shortened in favor of a third metro line. The shortened version for the extension will open in 2027.

=== Tramway: Lines T1 and T2 ===
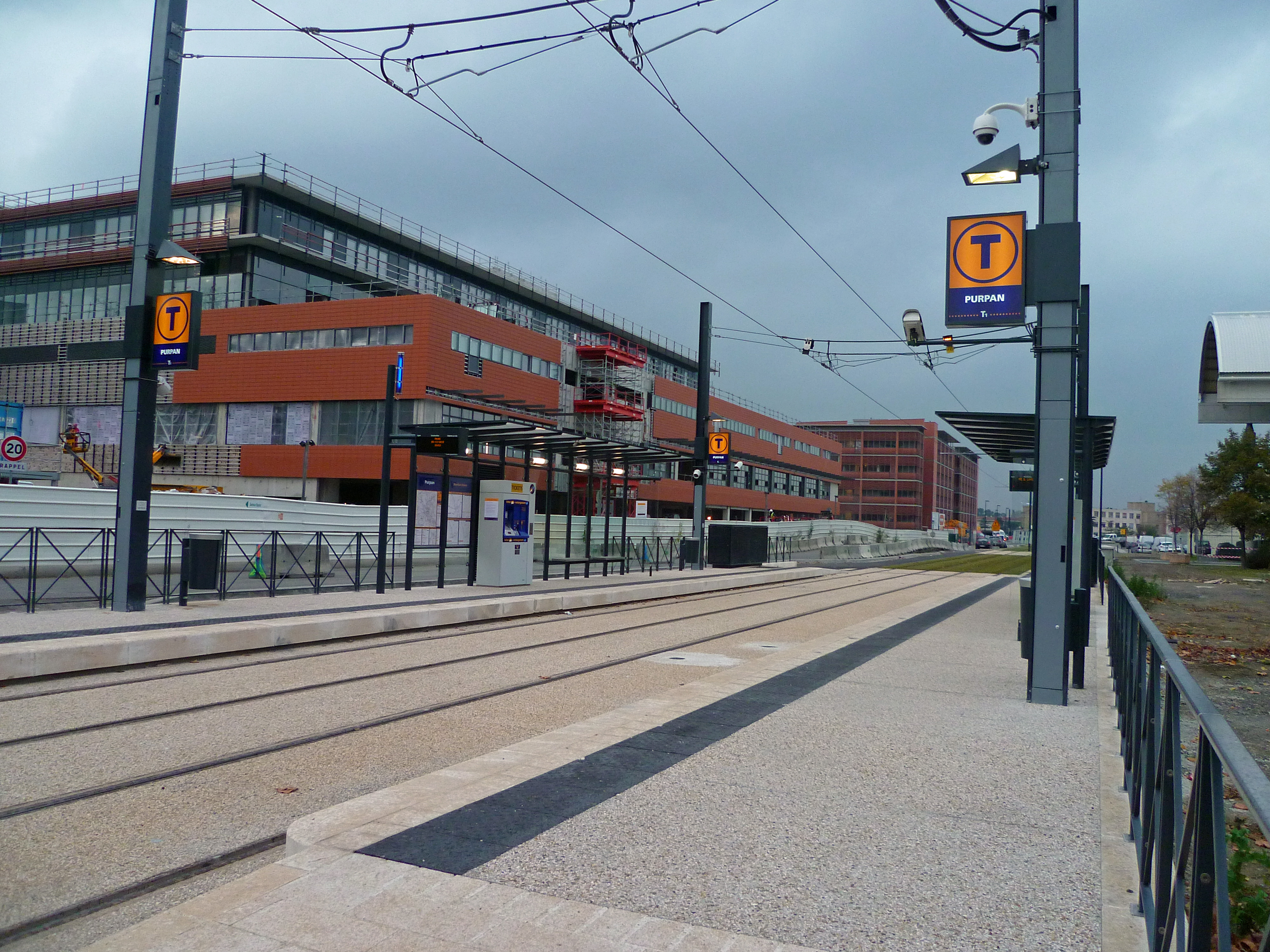
Line T1 of the Toulouse tramway, at the Purpan station.

The Tramway Line T1 runs between MEETT and Arènes passing through the city of Blagnac. It was set to open in November 2010, but this was delayed by industrial action; instead opening in December 2010. The extension to Palais de Justice was opened in 2013 and the one to MEETT was opened in 2020.

The line has 25 stops:

- Palais de Justice (transfer: Metro Line B)
- Île du Ramier
- Fer à Cheval
- Avenue de Muret - Marcel Cavaillé
- Croix de Pierre
- Déodat-de-Séverac
- Arènes (transfer: Metro line A, suburban train line Arènes-Colomiers)
- Hippodrome
- Zénith
- Cartoucherie
- Purpan
- Arènes Romaines
- Ancely
- Servanty-Airbus
- Guyenne Berry
- Pasteur-Mairie de Blagnac
- Place du Relais
- Odyssud-Ritouret
- Patinoire-Barradels
- Grand Noble
- Place Georges Brassens
- Andromède-Lycée
- Beauzelle - Aéroscopia
- Aéroconstellation
- MEETT.

Line T2 opened in 2015 as a branch of line T1. Both lines had a common section from southern terminus Palais de Justice to Ancely. Then, line T2 goes towards the Toulouse Blagnac airport. Line T2 was closed in 2023 in order to construct the Aeroport Express line.

== Technology ==
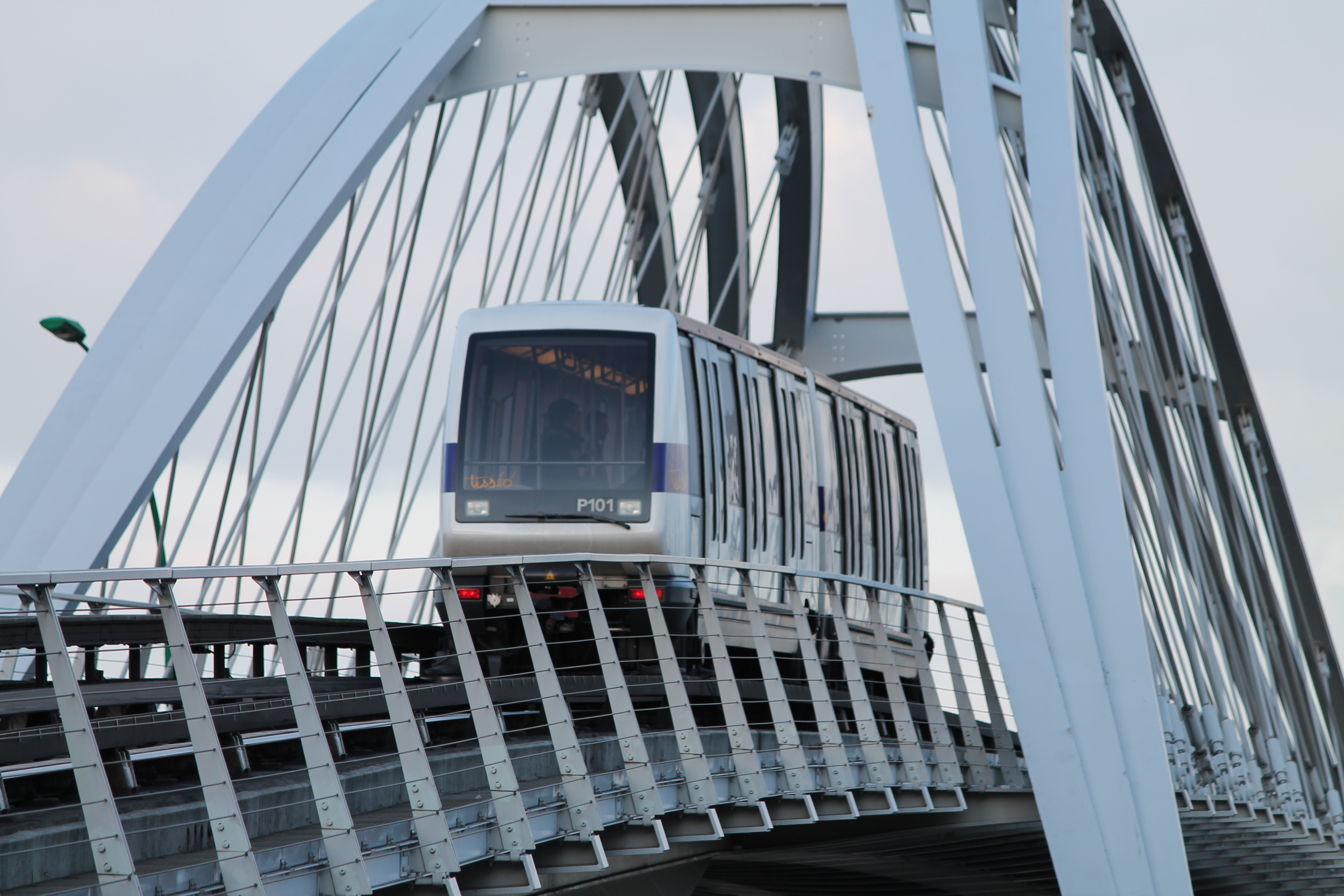
VAL 208

Lines A and B are automatic metro lines, which use VAL technology built by Matra, now part of Siemens Transportation Systems.

Since the upgrade, all of the 18 stations on line A are 52 metres (170 ft 7 in) long and can therefore handle four-car trains. Platform screen doors separate the platforms from the tracks and are synchronised with the doors of the trains. Therefore, each platform must be absolutely straight. Each two-car set can accommodate from 150 to 220 people.

The trains have rubber tyres and use a third rail 750 V direct current electric supply. They can climb slopes of up to 7%, reach a top speed of approximately 60 km/h (37 mph), and can operate on the line at a maximum frequency of 65 seconds.

A central control centre regulates the network and ensures its safety and can take control of trains remotely in the event of an incident or a breakdown.

Currently, two types of rolling stock are in circulation: VAL 206 and VAL 208. In total, 116 trains serve the network. The name of the next station is announced just before each stop and just after the departure from the preceding station. In VAL 208 trains, the name of the next station and its connections are shown in each car on a panel of LEDs.

== Future plans ==
=== Abandoned plans ===
Until 2014, an extension of the tram line to Grand Rond was planned. Another tram line would have also been built in time for the arrival of the LGV Bordeaux–Toulouse. The project has been canceled in 2014 due to the change of leadership of the city in favor of the new metro line. Extensions to Saint-Orens and Plaisance-du-Touch were also envisioned but they were canceled in 2010 and replaced by bus lines.

In January 2006, the Mayor of Toulouse, Jean-Luc Moudenc called for a fast decision on a southern extension of Line B. This 5.2 km (3.2 mi) extension would include an underground crossing of the Canal du Midi followed by a 4.5 km (2.8 mi) viaduct. It would include five new overhead stations and would terminate at Labège - La Cadène. It would cost €365 million and be opened in 2020. In 2015, this project was shelved in favor of a third metro line. It has reappered in a shortened version in 2016.

A plan for a 5 km (3.1 mi) line A northern extension to L'Union was mentioned. The terminus station would be at Plaine des Monges. The plan was never studied. Plans for extension of the subway network to Saint-Simon were also vaguely mentioned by local representatives but never studied.

=== Current plans ===
Map of Toulouse's public transports (Metro, tramway, suburban train line and urban Tricable gondola line), including the future Line C

==== Metro Line C ====
The 21 stations of the future Line C.

In December 2015, the transport authority SMTC unveiled the outline route for what was then called the Toulouse Aerospace Express, which will be the third metro line in the city. The 27 km (17 mi) 20 station line will connect the Colomiers railway station near the Toulouse-Blagnac Airport on the west through city centre before ending at Labège in the southeastern suburb of Toulouse. Further studies and a public inquiry took place to select the final route. The line is expected to cost €3.151bn and to finish construction in 2028. The line has been renamed line C in 2022 to better fit the naming of the already existing Line A and Line B. Construction has started in December 2022. Cost have risen to €3.1bn.

==== Metro Line B extension ====
An extension of Line B to Labège Madron to connect to line C is also in construction. The project is named Connexion Ligne B and is expected to cost around €250mn. It is a shortened version of the former extension project. It is expected to be achieved in 2027.

==== Trains ====
15 new trains were ordered in 2020 and are expected to enter service in 2025.

==== Tram T2 reopening ====
Tramway line T2 will reopen in 2026 as the Aéroport Express line. It will use the existing infrastructure to provide a shuttle service from future Blagnac line C metro station to the station of the Toulouse-Blagnac airport.

== See also ==
- List of metro systems
- List of Toulouse Metro stations
- Rubber-tyred metro
