= Toulouse tramway =

Two-line tram system in Toulouse, France

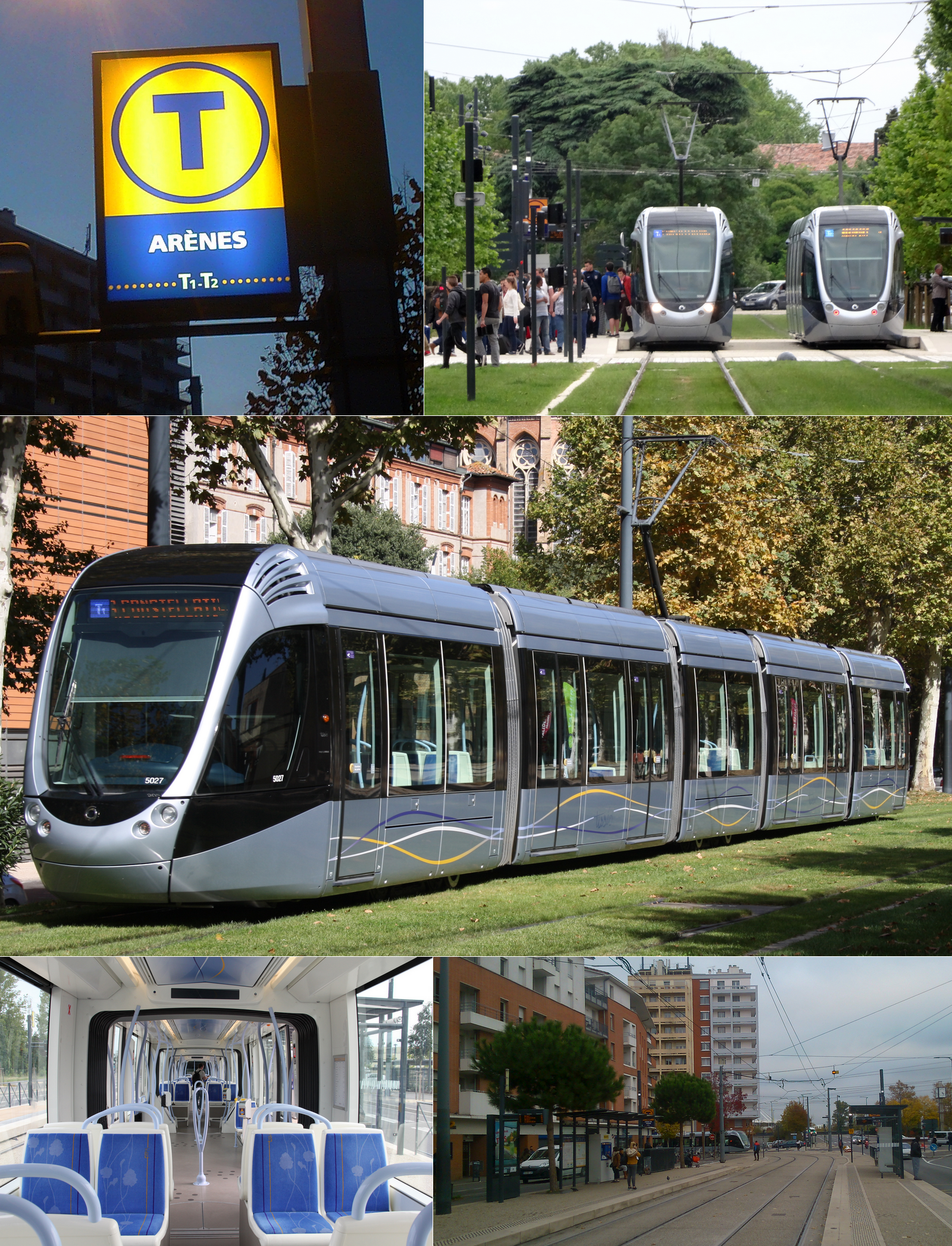

Overview
- Native name: Tramway de Toulouse
- Locale: Toulouse, Occitanie, France
- Transit type: Tram
- Number of lines: 2
- Number of stations: 28
- Annual ridership: 12.86 million (2018)
- Website: Tisséo

Operation
- Began operation: 11 December 2010
- Operator: Tisséo

Technical
- System length: 17.2 km (10.7 mi)
- Track gauge: 1,435 mm (4 ft 8 1/2 in) standard gauge
- Electrification: 750 V DC catenary
System map
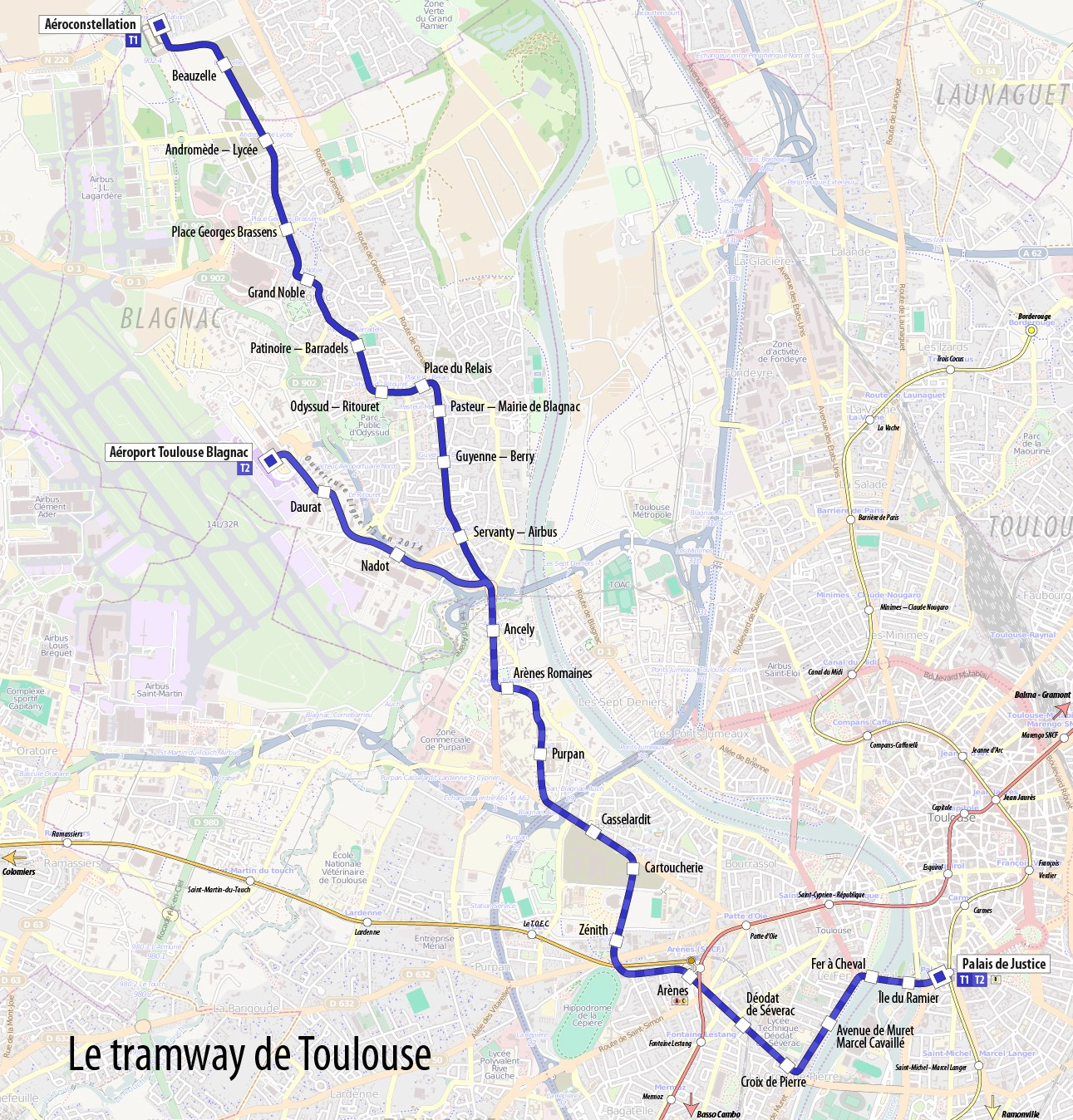
Map of Toulouse tramway lines.

The Toulouse tramway (French: Tramway de Toulouse) is a two-line tram system in Toulouse, Occitania, France, and operates from Toulouse to the suburb of Beauzelle, passing through Blagnac. The Line T1 tramway serves 24 stations, and runs over of a route that is 15 kilometres (9.3 mi) long. Including the three-station, 2.4-kilometre (1.5 mi) branch line of Line T2 which opened in April 2015, the entire Toulouse tramway serves 27 stations and is based on the Alstom Citadis 302 family of low-floor trains.

The system and its fare structure is incorporated into the Tisséo network of Toulouse, which also includes the Toulouse Metro.

== Line T1 ==
Specific map of line T1

Line T1 originally served 18 stations, and ran over of a route that is 11 kilometres (6.8 mi) long. It was originally planned that the Line T1 tramway would open on 27 November 2010, but industrial action delayed the opening to December 2010.

An extension of Tram Line T1 of almost four kilometers from the original southern terminus at Arènes to Garonne and Palais de Justice, allowing direct transfer between the tram and Toulouse Metro Line B, opened in December 2013.

A 500 m (550 yd) northern extension serving a new exposition centre opened in August 2020 and three existing stops had their names changed.

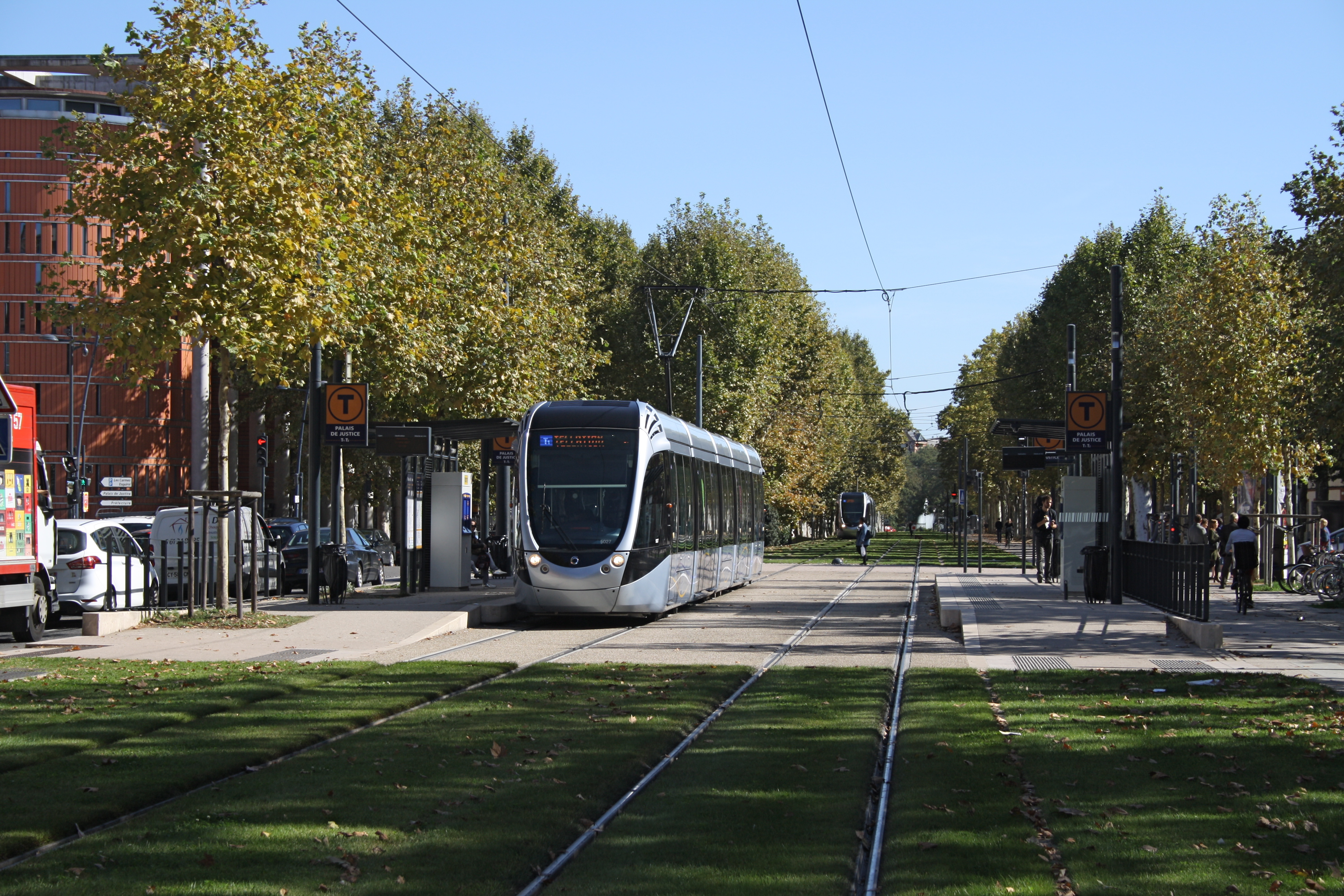
Tram at Palais de Justice station, east terminus of line T1 and T2.

Stations	Commune
Palais-de-Justice	Toulouse
Île du Ramier	Toulouse
Fer à Cheval	Toulouse
Avenue de Muret-Marcel Cavaillé	Toulouse
Croix de Pierre	Toulouse
Déodat-de-Séverac	Toulouse
Arènes	Toulouse
Hippodrome (formerly Zénith)	Toulouse
Zénith (formerly Cartoucherie)	Toulouse
Cartoucherie (formerly Casselardit)	Toulouse
Purpan	Toulouse
Arènes-Romaines	Toulouse
Ancely	Toulouse
Servanty – Airbus	Blagnac
Guyenne – Berry	Blagnac
Pasteur – Mairie-de-Blagnac	Blagnac
Place-du-Relais	Blagnac
Odyssud – Ritouret	Blagnac
Patinoire – Barradels	Blagnac
Grand-Noble	Blagnac
Place-Georges-Brassens	Blagnac
Andromède – Lycée	Blagnac
Beauzelle	Beauzelle
Aéroconstellation	Beauzelle
MEETT	Beauzelle

== Line T2 ==
Specific map of line T2

Line T2 was originally a 2.4 km (1.5 mi) branch of line T1 called Line Envol (literally Takeoff) running from Jean Maga roundabout, between stations Ancely and Servanty-Airbus, to the Airport. But before its opening, it was finally commercially dissociate from line T1 and opened on 11 April 2015.

The line is the same as line T1 between Palais de Justice and Ancely, then it continues to the Airport with 2 new stations between, Nadot and Daurat.

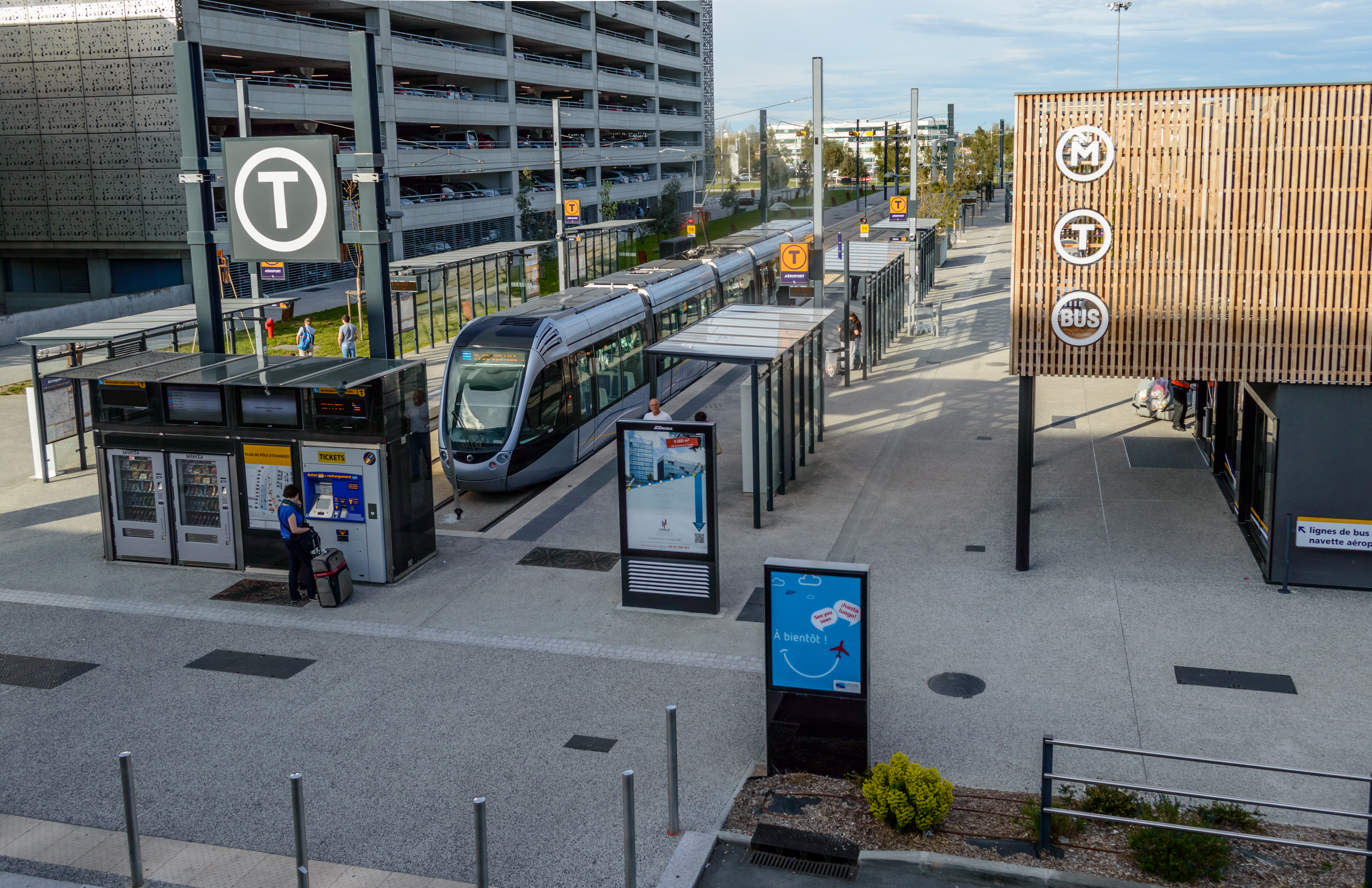
The Airport station, north terminus of line T2.

By 2026, line T2 will become the Aéroport Express (Airport Express) line between a new Blagnac station and Airport only. At Blagnac station, it will connect to current T1 tramway line and to new line C of Toulouse Metro, which will be opened in 2028. Line T2 was closed in 2023 order to modify the line

Stations	Commune
Palais-de-Justice	Toulouse
Île du Ramier	Toulouse
Fer à Cheval	Toulouse
Avenue de Muret-Marcel Cavaillé	Toulouse
Croix de Pierre	Toulouse
Déodat-de-Séverac	Toulouse
Arènes	Toulouse
Zénith	Toulouse
Cartoucherie	Toulouse
Casselardit	Toulouse
Purpan	Toulouse
Arènes-Romaines	Toulouse
Ancely	Toulouse
Nadot	Blagnac
Daurat	Blagnac
Airport	Blagnac

== See also ==
- Toulouse Metro
- List of Toulouse metro stations
- Trams in France
- List of town tramway systems in France
