= Tisséo =

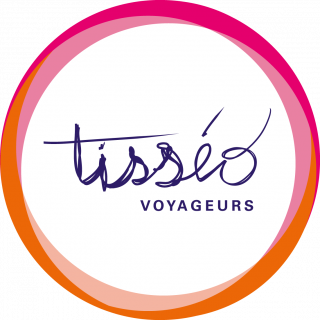
- Company type: State-owned company
- Industry: Public transport
- Founded: 1972 (as SEMVAT) in Toulouse, France. 2002 (as Tisséo)
- Headquarters: 4, Impasse Paul Mesplé; 31081 Toulouse, France
- Area served: Toulouse metropolitan area
- Key people: Jean Michel Lattes (President of Tisséo-Collectivités); Serge Jop (President of Tisséo-Voyageurs); Jean-Michel Lattes (President of Tisséo-Ingénierie)
- Number of employees: 2,824
- Website: tisseo.fr/en

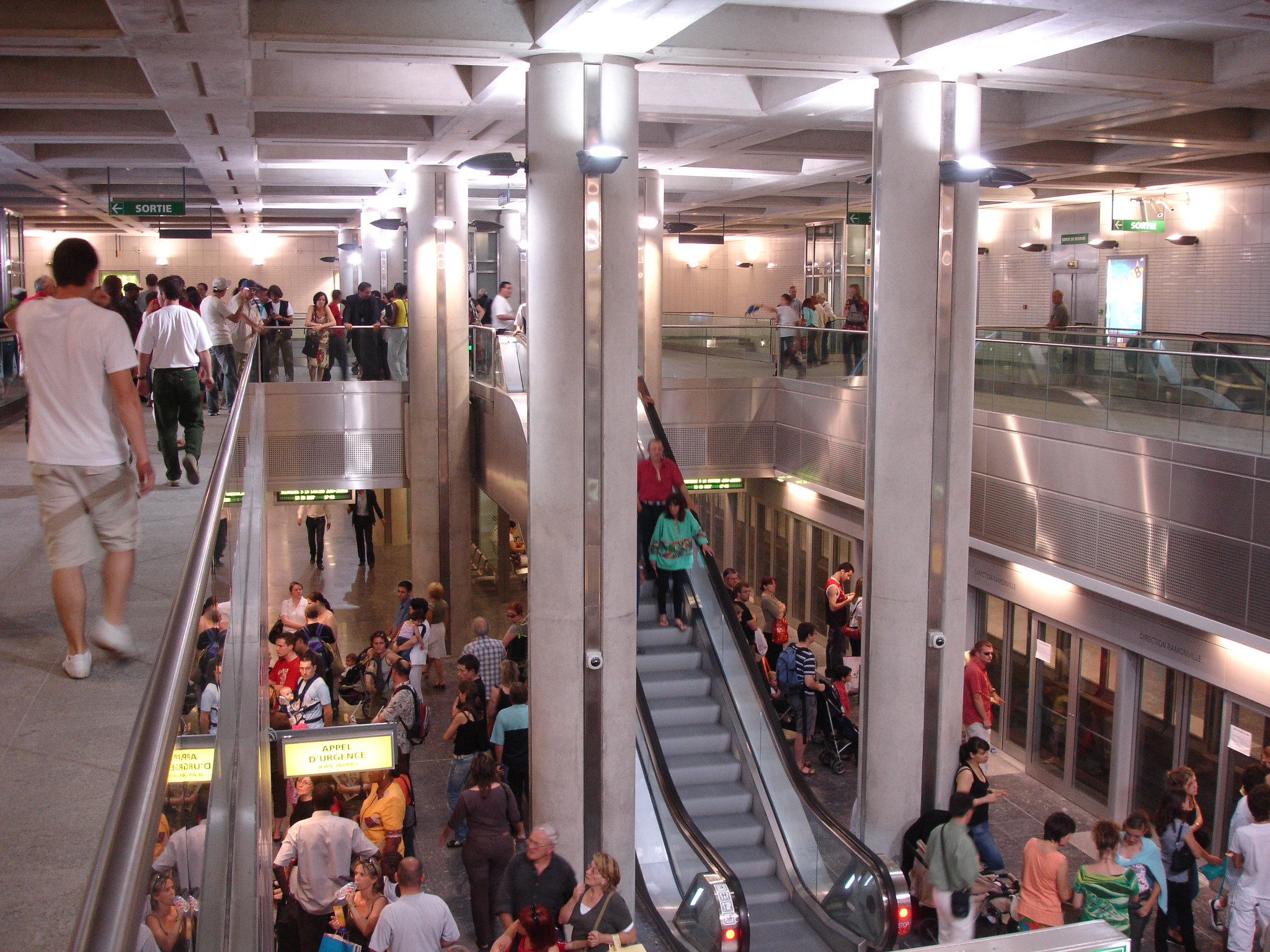
Jean-Jaurès metro station

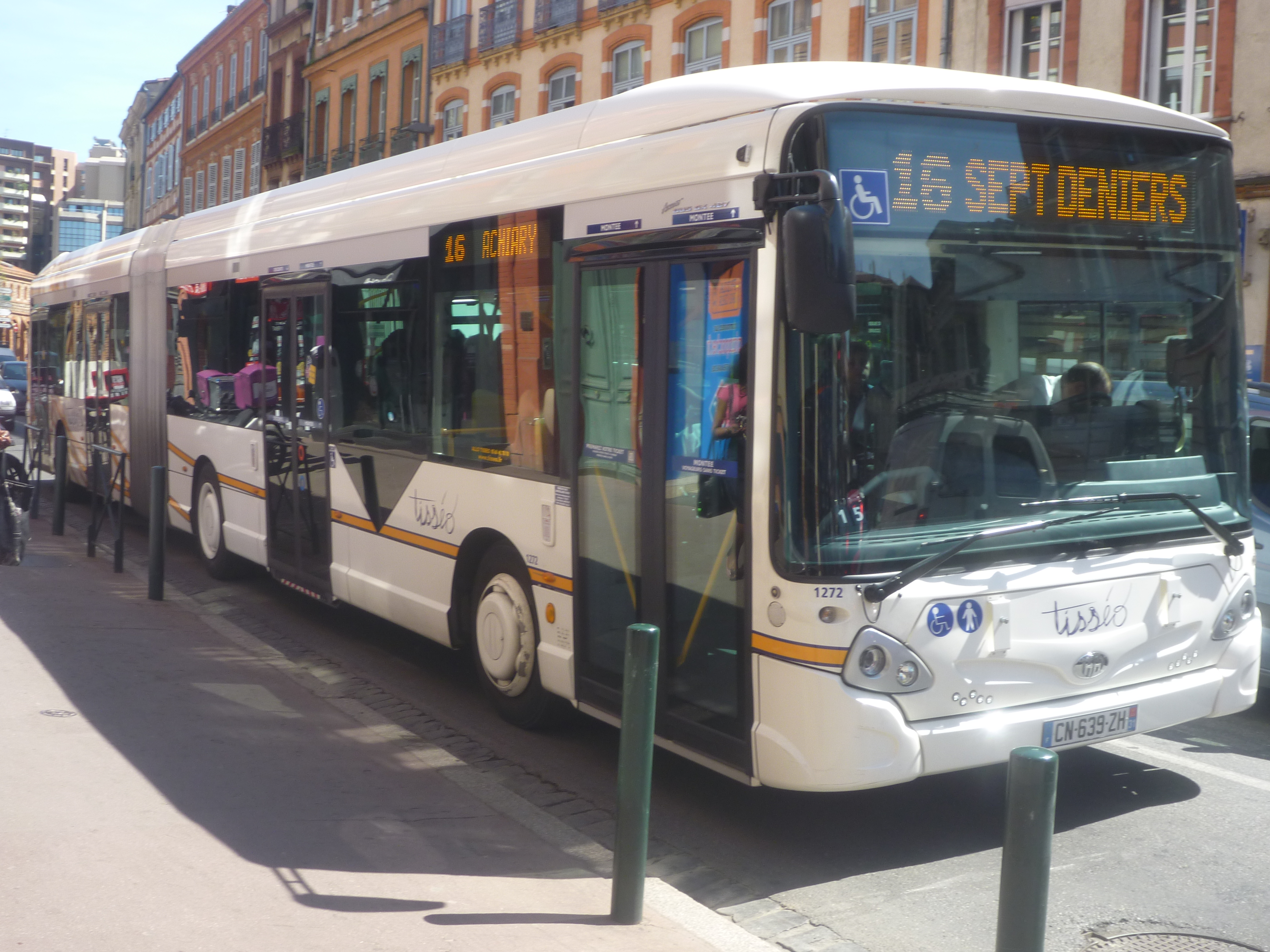
Tisséo bus serigraphy (2013–2016), now replaced by grey design

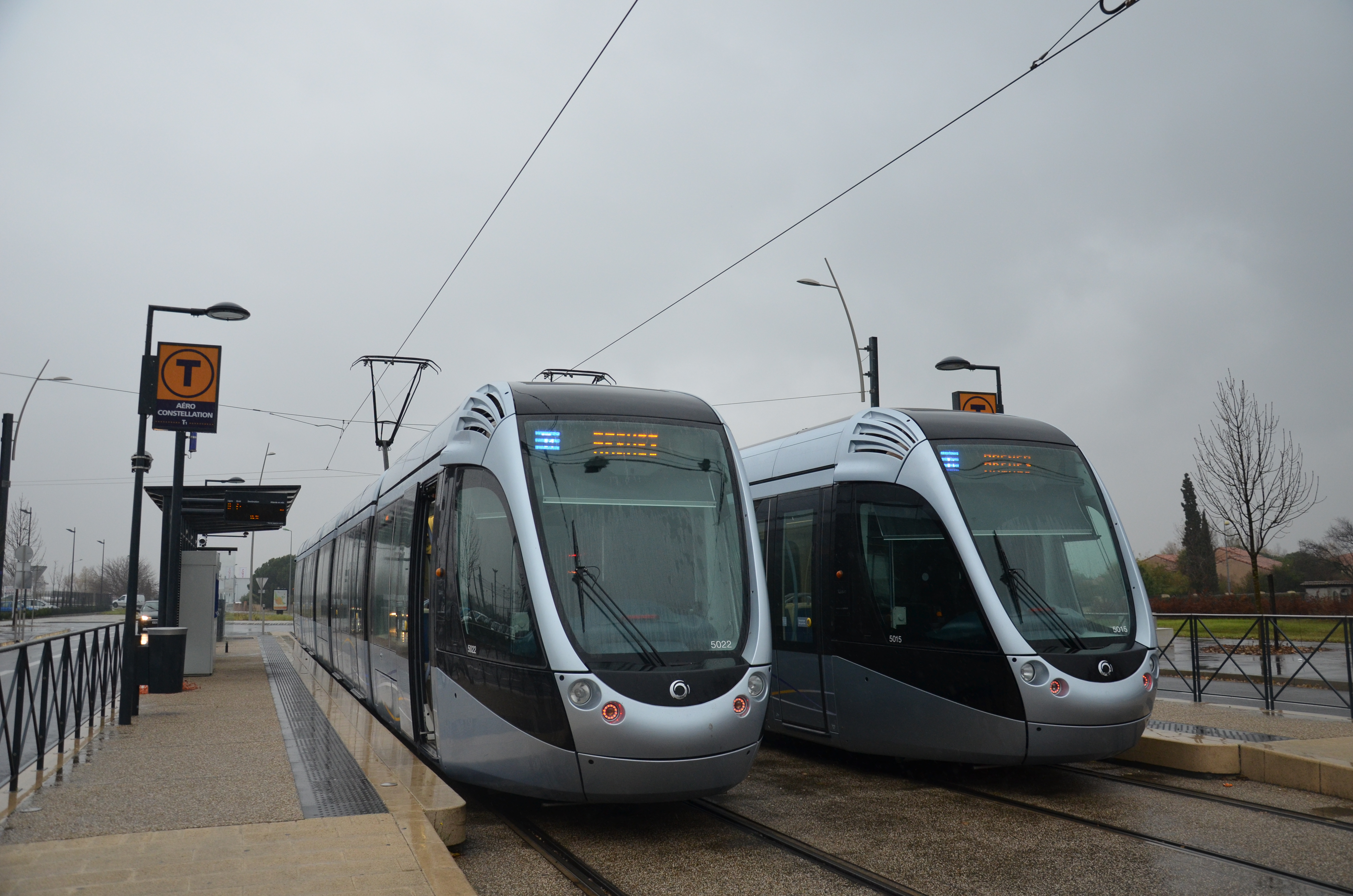
Tisséo tramway system

Tisséo is the brand adopted in 2002 for the transport network of Toulouse, France. Operating under the authority of the Syndicat mixte des transports en commun (SMTC), Tisséo operates two metro lines, two tramway lines, a hundred buses, and shuttle services (bus, mobibus, TAD), with a unified magnetic ticketing and RFID card system.

== Subway ==
Opened in 1993, the Tisséo metro has two lines, fully automated.

Subway access requires a magnetic ticket or an RFID card, usable both on metro networks, bus, tramway and TAD (on-demand bus).

The position and live schedules of all buses, subway trains, and trams are available on the website and Tisséo app.

== See also ==
- List of Toulouse metro stations
- Toulouse tramway
