= Peyrehorade station =

Railway station in Peyrehorade, France

Coordinates: 43°32′48″N 1°06′58″W

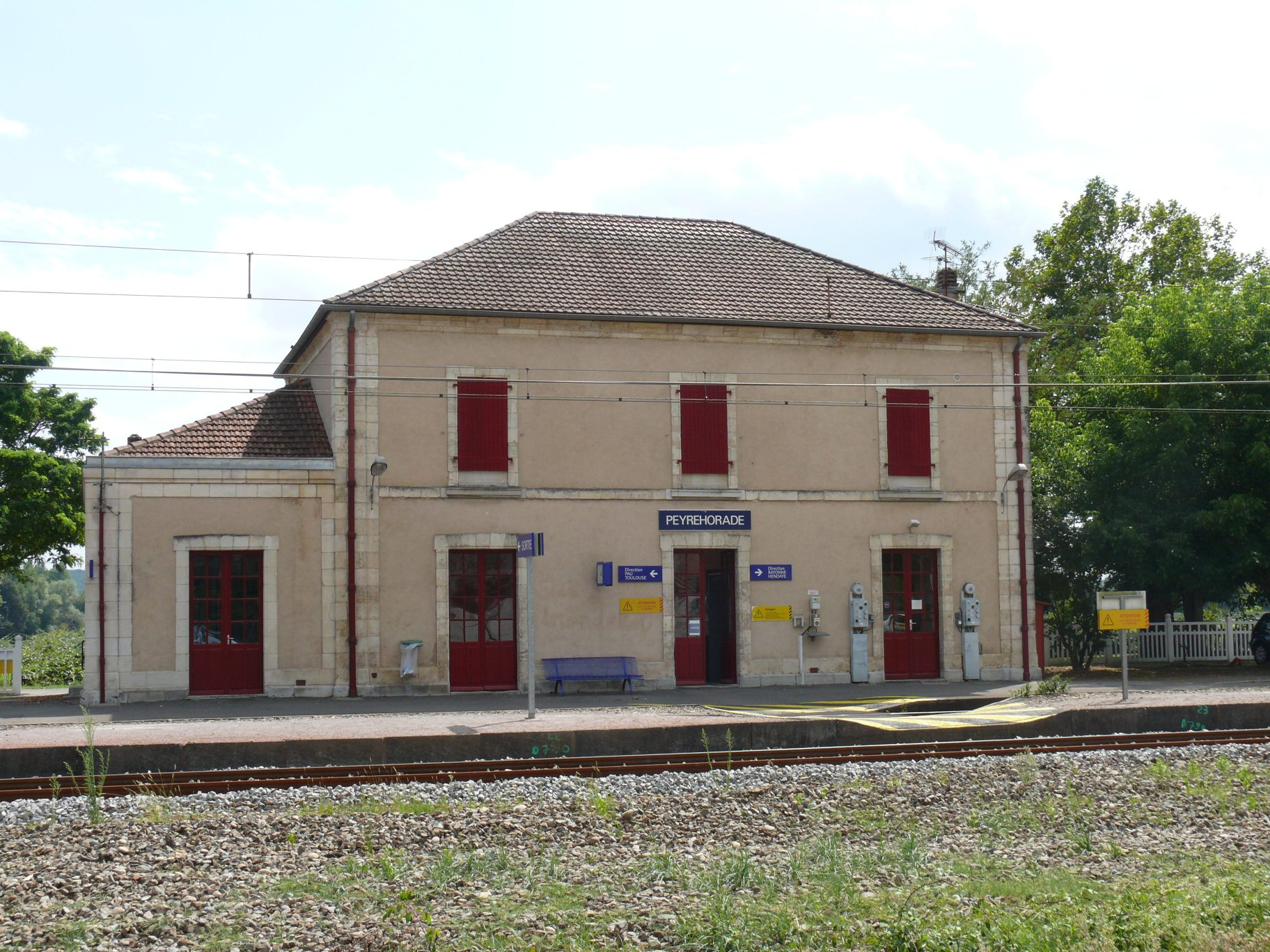
Peyrehorade train station.

Peyrehorade is a railway station in Peyrehorade, Landes, Nouvelle-Aquitaine, France. The station is located on the Toulouse - Bayonne railway line. The station is served by TER (local) services operated by the SNCF.

== Train services ==
The following services currently call at Peyrehorade:

- local service (TER Nouvelle-Aquitaine) Bayonne - Pau - Tarbes

Preceding station	TER Nouvelle-Aquitaine	Following station
Urt towards Bayonne	53	Puyoô towards Tarbes
