= Béarn =

Province in France

Coordinates: 43.3000°N 0.3667°W

Béarn Biarn Bearn
- Flag Coat of arms

- Béarn in Europe
- Country: France
- Time zone: UTC+1 (CET)

Béarn (US: /beɪˈɑːrn/; French: [beaʁn]; Occitan: Bearn [beˈaɾ] or Biarn; Basque: Bearno or Biarno; Latin: Benearnia or Bearnia) is one of the traditional provinces of France, located in the Pyrenees mountains and in the plain at their feet, in Southwestern France. Along with the three Basque provinces of Soule, Lower Navarre and Labourd, the Principality of Bidache, as well as small parts of Gascony, it forms the current Pyrénées-Atlantiques department. The capitals of Béarn were successively Beneharnum (until 841), Morlaàs (from c. 1100), Orthez (from the second half of the 13th century) and then Pau (beginning in the mid-15th century).

Béarn is bordered by the Basque provinces of Soule and Lower Navarre to the west, Gascony (Landes and Armagnac) to the north, Bigorre to the east, in addition to Spain (Aragon) to the south.

Today, the mainstays of the Béarn area are the petroleum industry, the aerospace industry through the helicopter turboshaft engine manufacturer Turbomeca, tourism and agriculture (much of which involves maize (corn) grown for seed). Pau was the birthplace of Elf Aquitaine, which has now become a part of the Total S.A. petroleum company.

In the eastern part of the province are two small exclaves belonging to Bigorre. They are the result of how early Béarn grew to its traditional boundaries: some old lesser viscounties were added by marriage, and absorbed into Béarn: Oloron to the south/southwest c. 1050, Montanérès in the east in 1085, and Dax in the west in 1194. When Montanérès was added, five communities or parishes (Villenave-près-Béarn, Escaunets, Séron, Gardères, and Luquet) did not form part of the dowry; they remained, or became, part of Bigorre. Their attachment to Bigorre continues to the present, as they followed it into Hautes-Pyrénées, rather than being incorporated into the surrounding Pyrénées-Atlantiques.

== History ==
=== Etymology ===
French Basque Country (left side) and the Béarn (right side) in the Pyrénées-Atlantiques department on the Spanish border

The name Béarn derives from Beneharnum, the capital city of the ancient Venarni people, which was destroyed by Vikings by 840. The modern town of Lescar is built on the site of Beneharnum.

=== Prehistory ===
Agriculture and metallurgy were first practiced in the region around 4,000 years ago. Many dolmens, tumuli and megaliths have been found in Béarn dating to this era, suggesting that ancestor worship was an important religious activity in Neolithic Béarn. Construction of cromlêhs in Béarn continued into the Bronze Age.

Fortified villages were also constructed in Neolithic Béarn, and remains of these have been found near Asson, Bougarber and Lacq.

=== Antiquity ===
During the Iron Age, Béarn was a part of ancient Aquitania, where the proto-Basque people lived. The Benearni, from whom the name Bearn derives, were one of these peoples.

The region became part of the Roman Empire in the first century BC. Diocletian included Bearn in the Roman province of Novempopulania. Roman influence in the region waned in the fifth century AD, and Béarn experienced multiple barbarian invasions. Béarn was successively conquered by the Vandals, the Visigoths, the Merovingians and finally the Carolingians.

The fifth century AD also saw the arrival of Christianity in Béarn. The rural character of Béarn meant that Christianity took longer to become established there than elsewhere in France.

=== Middle Ages ===
The Vascons settled on the land between the Garonne and the Pyrenees, which the Franks had conquered from the Visigoths, and from the 6th century onwards controlled this territory; a duchy of Vasconia (then Gascony) was formed. In the 7th century, Odon had a large kingdom stretching from the Pyrenees to the Loire with Toulouse as its capital. The language commonly spoken by the Vascons was Aquitanian, although its area of influence continued to decline with the increasing Romanisation of the region from the 1st century BC. The Duchy of Gascony became fragmented from the 9th century onwards, allowing the creation of the Viscounty of Bearn. The people of Béarn thus organised themselves for the first time into an entity of their own. The first reigning dynasty was the Centulle family. It was also at this time, around the 8th or 9th century, that Beneharnum was devastated by the Normans. Morlaàs then became the new capital of a nascent principality. The Centulle allowed the primitive Béarn to extend to the south and east, and several marriages led to the integration of the viscounty of Oloron around 1050 and then that of Montaner in 1085. The county of Orthez was annexed in 1194 under the Moncade dynasty, and all these territories together formed the historic Béarn, which kept its borders intact until the Revolution.

Béarn was included in the original borders given to the Frankish kingdom by the Treaty of Verdun in 843, but the creation of a political entity of their own led to an evolution of this vassalage link. Thus, the gradual accession of Bearn to a de facto sovereignty status is the major theme of this medieval period. From the 11th to the 14th century, Béarn was tossed between the zones of influence of the dukes of Gascony, the kings of Aragon, the kings of England and the kings of France. Béarn remained under the control of the dukes of Gascony after its division in the 9th century, and this link was already very weak in the second half of the 11th century. Vassalage was only theoretical under Gaston IV the Crusader, who took part in the First Crusade and the Reconquista. He played a decisive role alongside Alfonso I of Aragon. Bearn became the ally of Aragon, breaking the last links with Gascony. This alliance was initially balanced, but the union of Aragon with Catalonia in 1137 broke this balance in favour of Aragon. Béarn became a vassal county of the Aragonese crown, which tried to create a vast ensemble on both sides of the Pyrenees.

In 1213, the Aragonese defeat at the battle of Muret led to the end of Aragonese interventions in the region. The ties of vassalage between Béarn and Aragon were gradually weakened and then broken, without any clashes, during the first half of the 13th century. This rupture was the occasion for the kings of England to demand the return of Bearn to the Gascon fold. In spite of his desire of independence, Gaston VII pays homage to the king of England in 1240. The return of Béarn to the Gascon sphere of influence is also reflected by a change of capital, Orthez (closer to Gascony) replaces Morlaàs in 1242. Gaston VII will not, in spite of everything, cease to revolt against this intrusion in the affairs of a country which previously had a very broad autonomy. He had to admit defeat after being taken prisoner at Winchester by Edward I of England in 1276.

=== A sovereign principality ===
Gaston VII chose to marry his second daughter, Marguerite de Béarn, to the Count of Foix, Roger-Bernard III. This marriage provoked the indissoluble union between the houses of Foix and Béarn. The new Foix-Béarn were in a delicate situation, with Béarn on the one hand a vassal of the kings of England, and Foix a vassal of the kings of France. The beginnings of the future Hundred Years' War between the two kingdoms were already coming, complicating the balance within this new dynasty even more. Until Gaston II of Foix-Béarn, the position of the sovereigns of Béarn oscillated between neutrality and following the French positions (without paying tribute). The people of Bearn were reluctant to follow a policy favourable to the kings of France, they felt that they belonged to the Gascon community and saw the kingdom of France as a foreign land. It was not until Gaston III, known as Fébus, that a new policy appeared: to make Bearn a sovereign and neutral country.

Fébus' project was the culmination of the long periods of autonomy experienced by Béarn in previous eras. Now in the midst of the Hundred Years' War, Fébus took advantage of the French rout of Crécy in 1346 to distance himself from the kingdom of France. On 25 September 1347, he declared to an envoy of Philip VI that Bearn was a land that he "had from God and from no man in the world", an act considered to be a declaration of independence. Subsequently, he avoided French reprisals with the disaster of the Battle of Poitiers in 1356. Fébus also managed to ward off English intentions for Bearn. To do this, he faced the Black Prince, who claimed Bearn as a prince of Aquitaine. After the French and English failures to obtain a tribute, the autonomous viscounty became a de facto sovereign principality. The viscounts gave up this title to present themselves as lords of the sovereign country of Bearn. When Fébus died without an heir, the principality reverted to the House of Grailly.

In 1434, Gaston IV of the House of Grailly married the Infanta Eleanor of Navarre and became crown prince of the kingdom of Navarre, transferring his court from Orthez to Pau in 1464. His granddaughter Catherine of Navarre was the last ruler of Navarre and Béarn of the House of Grailly. Her only surviving son Henry II had only one surviving child, Jeanne d'Albret, by whose marriage to Antoine de Bourbon, Duke of Vendôme Béarn would pass into the hands of the House of Bourbon. Jeanne and Antoine's son, who would later reign as Henry IV of France, was born at the Château de Pau in the principality. By Henry IV's accession, Béarn became part of the personal lands of the King of France and more firmly integrated into the Kingdom of France.

== Transport ==
=== Road ===
Béarn is served by two autoroutes. The A64 (l'autoroute pyrénéenne, European designation E80) was built in 1977 and links Pau, Toulouse and Bayonne. In Béarn, the A64 has junctions serving the towns of Salies-de-Béarn, Orthez, Artix, Pau and Soumoulou.

The A65 (l'autoroute de Gascogne, European designation E7) links Pau with Langon. It serves the Béarnese towns of Lescar, Thèze and Garlin. At Langon, the A65 joins on to the A62, which continues to Bordeaux. The A65 was opened in 2010, and was at the time France's most expensive autoroute.

Several more minor routes also serve Béarn. The Route Nationale 134 links the south of Pau with Somport in the Aspe Valley. Several mountain roads link Somport with Spain.

=== Rail ===
Three railway lines serve Béarn. The first of these is the Toulouse to Bayonne railway, which was opened in stages between 1861 and 1867. Several rail stations are located on this line, including those of Coarraze-Nay, Assat, Pau, Artix, Orthez and Puyoô. The Puyoô to Dax railway line enables trains to run from Béarn to Bordeaux. Both these railway lines are served by TGV, Intercités and TER.

The third railway line, the Pau to Canfranc line, serves the south of Béarn. It was put into service between 1883 and 1928. However, the railway line been partially closed since 1970. This is because in 1970, a bridge carrying this rail line over the Gave d'Aspe was destroyed by a train derailment; SNCF consequently closed the line south of the Gare d'Oloron-Sainte-Marie. An additional section of the line, between Oloron-Sainte-Marie and Bedous, was reopened by SNCF in 2016.

Canfranc Railway Station is located within Spain and is also served by the Spanish Jaca to Canfranc railway. International rail transport between Béarn and Aragon was thus previously possible using this route. In 2013, the regional governments of Aragon and Aquitaine agreed to take steps to further the economic links between their two regions, including possibly reopening the Pau-Canfranc railway line all the way to Canfranc Station. The two governments hope to have the line fully reopened by 2020.

A fourth railway line once linked Puyoô rail station to that of Mauléon-Licharre. This line opened in two stages between 1884 and 1887; it was closed to passengers in 1968 and to freight in 1989. The line was officially abandoned in 1991. A branch of this line ran from Autevielle to Saint-Palais. This branch is also now closed.

=== Aviation ===
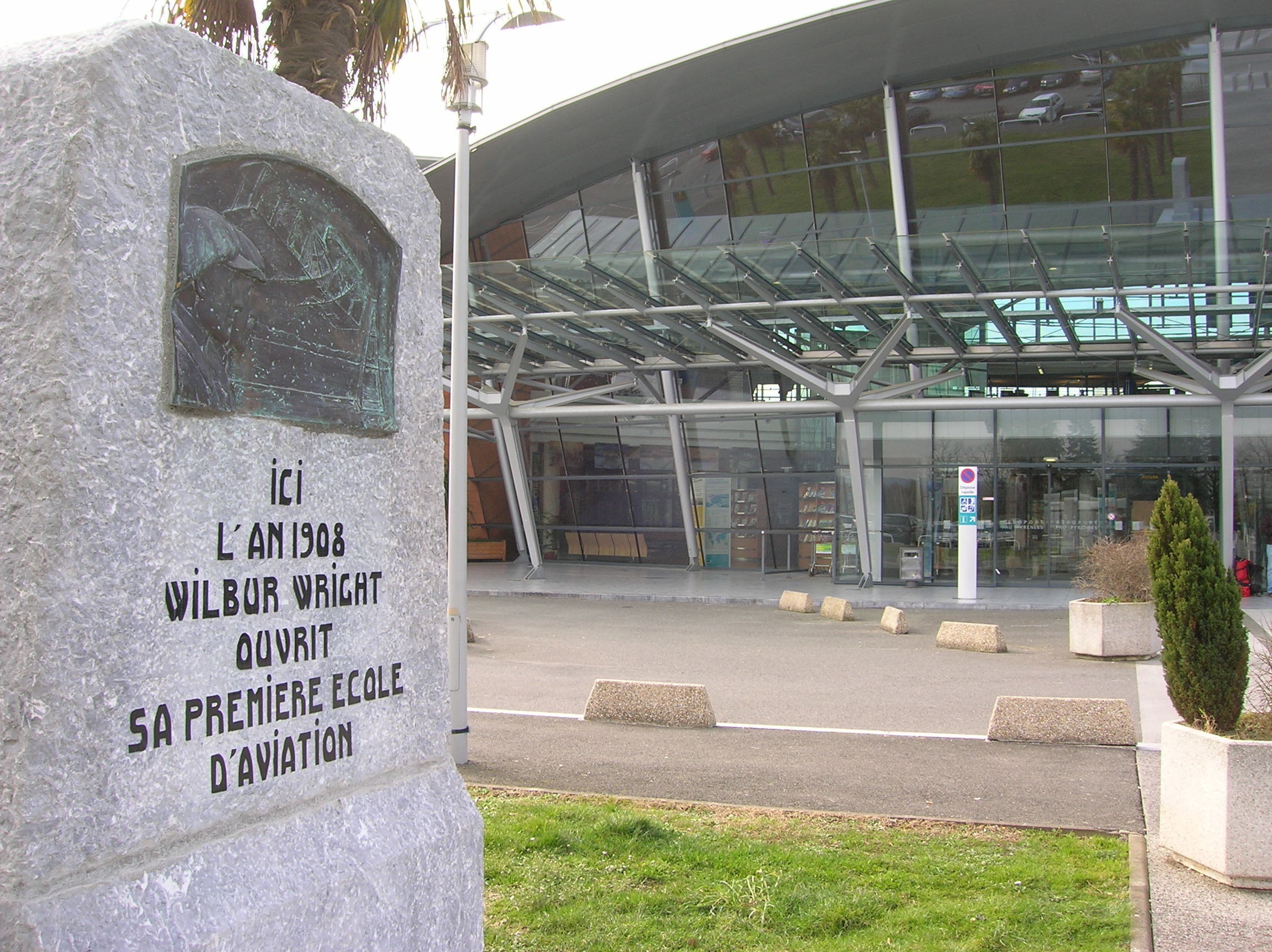
Monument to the world's first aviation school at Pau Pyrénées Airport.

Pau Pyrénées Airport, situated near Uzein, has direct flights to Charles de Gaulle Airport and Orly Airport (9 flights in total to Paris daily), Lyon–Saint-Exupéry Airport (3 flights daily) and Marseille Provence Airport. During summer, it also has flights to Bastia – Poretta Airport, Ajaccio Napoleon Bonaparte Airport, Naples International Airport and Bari Karol Wojtyła Airport. 634,000 passengers used Pau Pyrénées Airport in 2015, making it the third busiest airport in the Nouvelle-Aquitaine région of France, after Bordeaux–Mérignac Airport and Biarritz Pays Basque Airport.

Béarn has a long association with aviation. The meteorological conditions of Béarn were convenient for early aviators, and the Wright brothers made several flights in Pont-Long, a flat marshy area north of Pau from 1908 onwards. Wilbur Wright helped set up the world's first aviation school, which opened outside Pau in 1908. Pau Pyrénées Airport is located on the site of this aviation school. The French military trains its paratroopers at the School of Airborne Troops, which has been located near Pau since 1946.

== Culture ==
The culture of Béarn is characterised by a strong regional identity shaped by history, the Pyrenean environment and Occitan heritage. Béarnais is the customary local name for the langue d’oc spoken across much of the region. It remains an important component of identity in the area, particularly among speakers and communities in the Haut-Béarn, the Ossau Valley and the Béarn des Gaves. Béarn architecture and history is dominant throughout the region, with monuments such as the Château de Pau highlighting the region’s medieval and royal history, including the period before Béarn and Navarre were formally united with the French Crown in 1620.

=== Food ===
Poule au pot is a celebrated specialty in Béarn where King Henry IV of France was born.

Béarnaise sauce is a French sauce named after the region, that is made of clarified butter, egg yolk, white wine vinegar, and herbs.

Bayonne ham is a cured ham from Bayonne in the region.

== People from Béarn ==
- Louis Barthou – Former politician
- François Bayrou – Politician, candidate in the 2002, 2007 and 2012 French presidential elections, leader of the centrist Democratic Movement party, former mayor of Pau, former government minister, former prime minister
- The family of Alexander Gordon Bearn
- Gaston de Béarn – Gaston XI of Béarn, Gaston IV of Foix
- Margaret, Viscountess of Béarn (c. 1245 – c. 1319)
- Mary, Viscountess of Béarn (d. after 1187)
- François de Béarn-Bonasse – Captain of the King, lord of Saint-Dos (or Sendos) and Labastide-Villefranche
- Jean-Baptiste Bernadotte, aka King Charles XIV John (1763–1844) – Marshal of France (1763–1844), then King of Sweden and Norway (Karl XIV Johan in Sweden, Karl III Johan in Norway) from 1818.
- Philippe Bernat-Salles – Former professional rugby player
- Claude-François Bertrand de Boucheporn, last intendant of the Ancien Régime in Béarn (1785–1790)
- Jean Bouilhou – Professional Rugby player
- Charles Denis Bourbaki – A Bearnese French army officer of Greek origins, he distinguished himself during the Crimean War. The Bearnese football club FA Bourbaki Pau is named after him.
- Julian Bourdeu – Migrant to Argentina, he was devoted to cultural endeavours, being also a journalist and a Police Commissary
- Pierre Bourdieu – French sociologist
- Nicolas Brusque – Former professional rugby player
- Bertrand Cantat – Singer of the rock band Noir Désir and convicted criminal
- Julien Cardy – Professional football player
- Jérémy Chardy – Professional tennis player
- Cataline, also known as Jean Caux or Jean-Jacques Caux – Legendary packer during several gold rushes in British Columbia, Canada, is said to have been from Béarn (among other possibilities)
- Nicolas Escudé – Former professional tennis player
- Patrice Estanguet – Slalom canoeist
- Tony Estanguet – Famous slalom canoeist
- Jean de Forcade de Biaix (1663–1729) – a Huguenot and descendant of the noble family of Forcade, he became a Prussian Lieutenant General and confidant of King Frederick I of Prussia
- Henry IV of France – Ruled as King of France from 1589 to 1610
- Pierre Jélyotte – Noted tenor of the Paris Opera
- Pierre Laclède – Co-founder of St. Louis, Missouri in 1764
- Alexandra Lacrabère – Handball player
- Jean de Laforcade, Seigneur de La Fitte-Juson – Attorney General, legislator, diplomat and descendant of the noble family of Forcade, he was described by 19th century genealogist, Bourrousse de Laffore as "…one of the most important men in Béarn…".
- Jean-Michel Larqué – Professional football player
- Jean Lassalle – Politician, candidate in the 2017 and 2022 French presidential elections
- Jeanne III of Navarre – Queen regnant of Navarre from 1555 to 1572 and mother of King Henry IV of France
- Xavier Navarrot – Poet
- Robert Paparemborde – Professional rugby player
- Jean-Baptiste Peyras-Loustalet – Professional rugby player
- Alejo Peyret – Noted writer, agronomist, colonial administrator and historian in Argentina after emigrating there at age 25
- Gaston III, Count of Foix, aka Gaston Phoebus, Gaston X of Bearn – Established Bearn's independence in 1347
- Gaston Planté – French physicist who invented the lead acid battery in 1859
- Jean Saint-Josse – Politician
- Édouard Tinchant – Politician born in Béarn, emigrated to the United States in 1862 and fought in the Civil War, elected as delegate to the 1867–1868 Louisiana constitutional convention, where he supported public rights for all, including civil and public rights for women
- Damien Traille – Rugby player

In Alexandre Dumas' The Three Musketeers series, the protagonist d'Artagnan came from Béarn; he mentions having attended his father's funeral there in the second book, Twenty Years After. In the first book of the series, upon meeting the Cardinal, it is also noted that d'Artagnan comes from Béarn. That d'Artagnan is usually referred to as a Gascon is neither surprising nor incorrect, as Béarn forms part of Gascony.

== See also ==
- Béarnese dialect
- Béret
- Fors de Béarn
- Garbure
- Laruns – Laruns is a typical Bearnese village and commune
- Pau Pyrénées Airport
- Viscountcy of Béarn
- Viscounts of Béarn
- House of Bernadotte
