= Coarraze–Nay station =

French railway station

Coordinates: 43°10′54″N 0°14′30″W

Coarraze-Nay is a railway station serving Coarraze and Nay, Nouvelle-Aquitaine, France. The station is located on the Toulouse – Bayonne railway line. The station is served by Intercités (long distance) and TER (local) services operated by the SNCF.

== Train services ==
The station is served by regional trains towards Bordeaux, Bayonne, Pau, Toulouse and Tarbes.

Preceding station	TER Nouvelle-Aquitaine	Following station
Assat towards Bordeaux	52	Montaut-Bétharram towards Tarbes
Assat towards Bayonne	53	Montaut-Bétharram towards Tarbes
Preceding station	TER Occitanie	Following station
Pau Terminus	15	Lourdes towards Toulouse
