= Ossun station =

Railway station in Ossun, France

Ossun
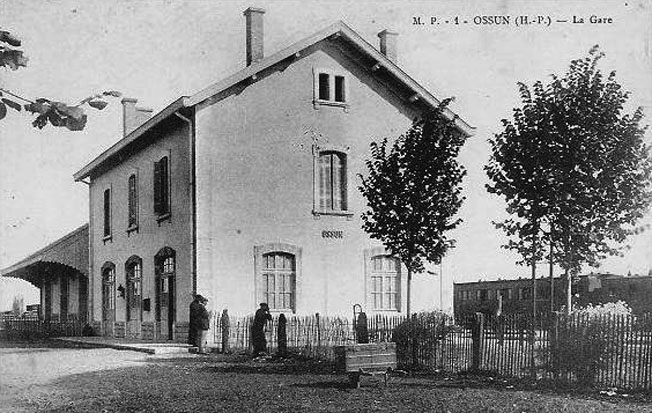
- Ossun station around 1900

General information
- Location: Impasse Sarthou 65380; Ossun, France
- Coordinates: 43.1833°N 0.0214°W
- Elevation: 366 m (1,201 ft)
- Owner: SNCF
- Operator: SNCF
- Line: Toulouse–Bayonne

Other information
- Station code: 87671313

History
- Opened: 9 April 1866

Services
Preceding station	TER Nouvelle-Aquitaine	Following station
Lourdes towards Bordeaux	52	Tarbes Terminus
Lourdes towards Bayonne	53	Tarbes Terminus
Location

Ossun station (French: Gare d'Ossun) is a railway station in Ossun, in the department of Hautes-Pyrénées, and in the region of Occitanie, France. The station is located on the Toulouse–Bayonne railway line. The station was opened in 1866 by the Chemins de fer du Midi. The station is served by TER (local) services operated by the SNCF. This is the closest station to the Tarbes–Lourdes–Pyrénées Airport.

== Location ==
The station is situated at 366 m (1,201 ft) altitude. Ossun station is part of the railway region of Toulouse, and is at PK 166,450 along the line from Toulouse–Bayonne, between the stations of Tarbes and Lourdes.

The station has two platforms. Platform 1 has an effective length of 213 m (699 ft) and platform 2 has an in-use length of 153 m (502 ft).

== History ==
The Chemins de fer du Midi opened the station of Ossun, between those of Juillan and Adé, on 9 April 1866. This was just before the opening of the rest of the railway line from Tarbes to Lourdes on 20 April 1866.

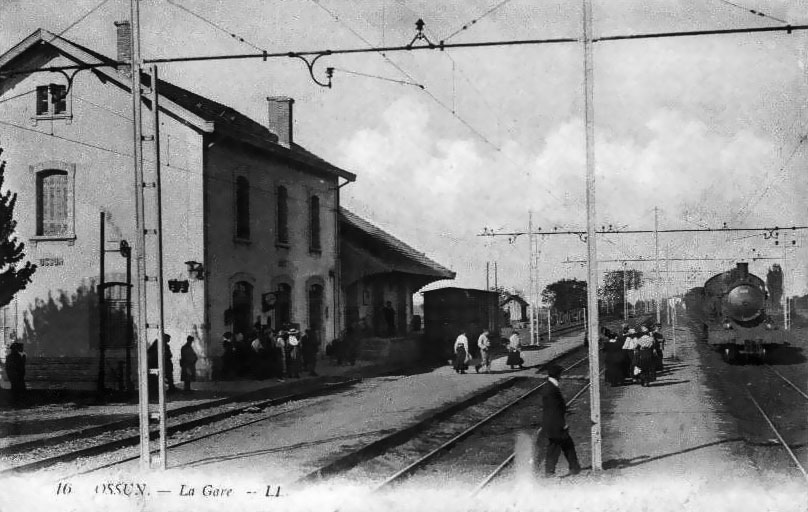
The station after electrification in 1913

== Train services ==
The station is served by regional trains towards Bordeaux, Bayonne, Pau and Tarbes.

== See also ==
- List of SNCF stations in Occitanie
