= Capvern station =

Railway station in Occitanie, France

Coordinates: 43°06′12″N 0°19′48″E

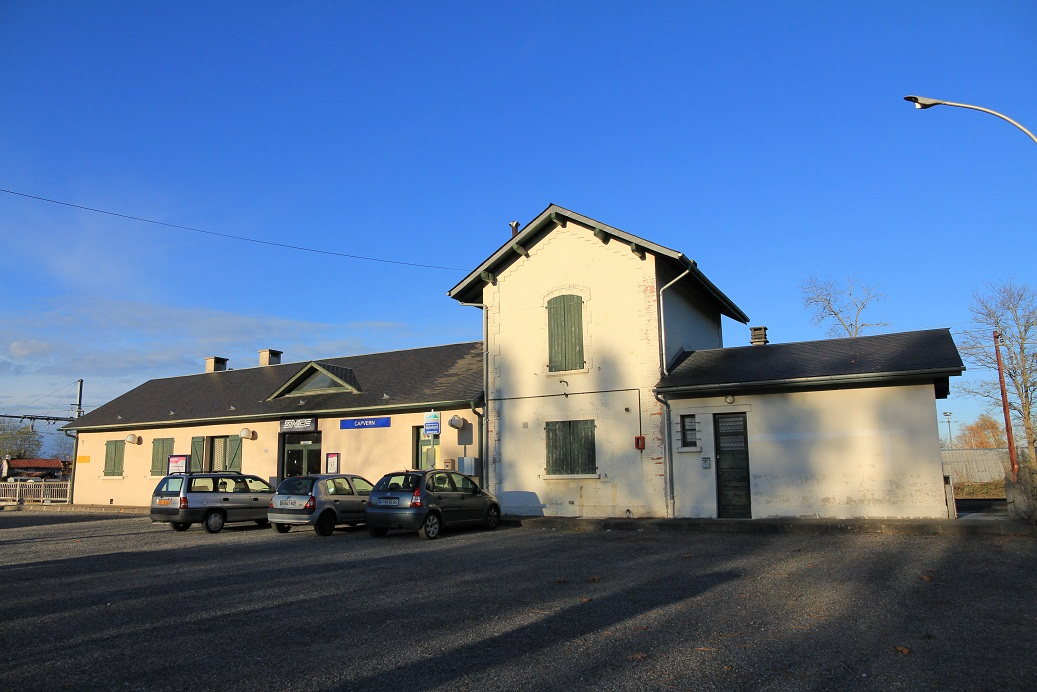
Capvern station entrance

Capvern is a railway station in Capvern, Occitanie, France. The station is on the Toulouse–Bayonne railway line. The station is served by TER (local) services operated by the SNCF.

== Train services ==
The following services currently call at Capvern:

- local service (TER Occitanie) Toulouse–Saint-Gaudens–Tarbes–Pau

Preceding station	TER Occitanie	Following station
Tournay towards Pau	15	Lannemezan towards Toulouse
