= Lourdes station =

Railway station in Lourdes, France

Lourdes
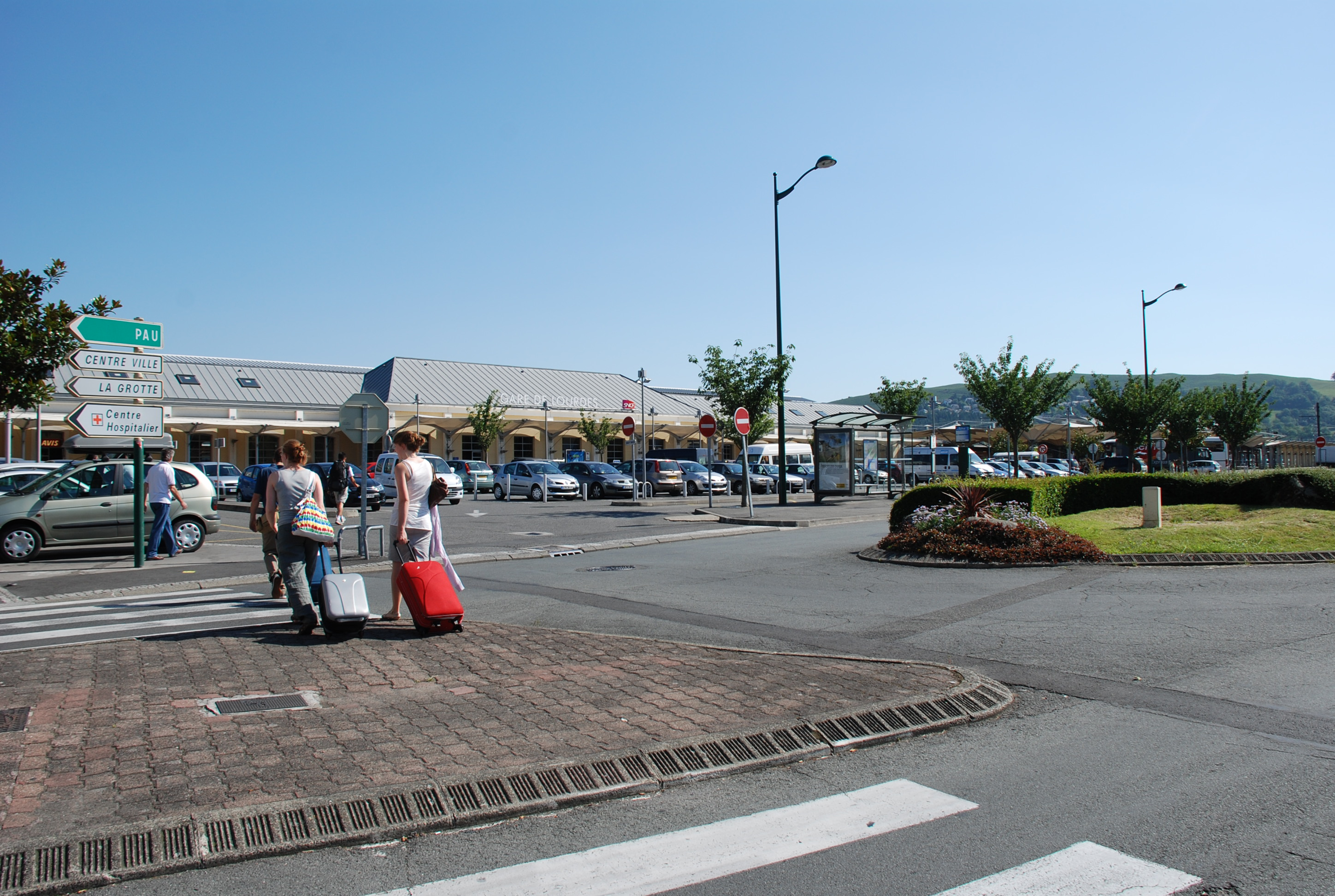
- Passenger building and station entrance

General information
- Location: 33 avenue de la gare 65100; Lourdes; France
- Coordinates: 43.1006°N 0.0422°W
- Elevation: 409 m (1,342 ft)
- Owner: RFF / SNCF
- Operator: SNCF
- Lines: Toulouse–Bayonne; Lourdes–Pierrefitte-Nestalas

Other information
- Station code: 87671339

History
- Opened: 20 April 1866
Services
Preceding station	SNCF	Following station
Pau towards Montparnasse	TGV inOui	Tarbes Terminus
Pau towards Hendaye	Intercités	Tarbes towards Toulouse
Tarbes towards Paris-Austerlitz	Intercités (night)	Pau towards Hendaye
Preceding station	TER Occitanie	Following station
Coarraze-Nay towards Pau	15	Tarbes towards Toulouse
Preceding station	TER Nouvelle-Aquitaine	Following station
Saint-Pé-de-Bigorre towards Bordeaux	52	Ossun towards Tarbes
Saint-Pé-de-Bigorre towards Bayonne	53	Ossun towards Tarbes
Location

The gare de Lourdes is a railway station in Lourdes, Occitanie, France. The station is on the Toulouse–Bayonne railway line. The station is served by TGV (high speed trains), Intercités de Nuit (night trains), Intercités (long distance) and TER (local) services operated by the SNCF.

The station is important for those coming to Lourdes on Catholic pilgrimages, with extra trains running to Lourdes at certain times.

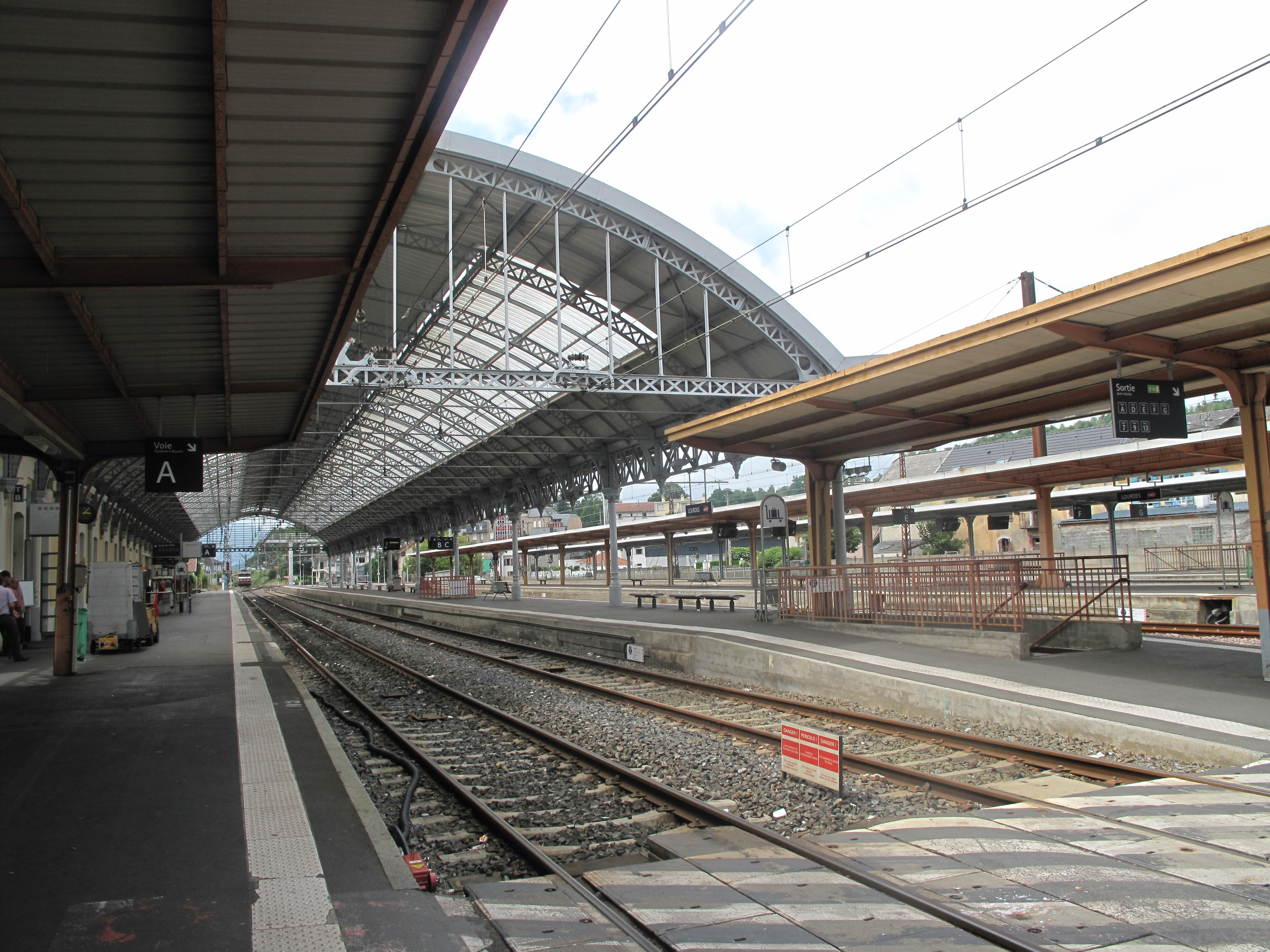
Lourdes station

== Train services ==
The following services currently call at Lourdes:

- TGV services Paris - Saint-Pierre-des-Corps - Bordeaux - Dax - Pau - Tarbes
- intercity services (Intercités) Hendaye–Bayonne–Pau–Tarbes–Toulouse
- local service (TER Nouvelle-Aquitaine) Bordeaux-Dax-Pau–Tarbes
- local service (TER Nouvelle-Aquitaine) Bayonne–Pau–Tarbes
- local service (TER Occitanie) Toulouse–Saint-Gaudens–Tarbes–Pau
