= Assat station =

Railway station

Coordinates: 43°15′15″N 0°17′42″W

Assat is a railway station in Assat, Nouvelle-Aquitaine, France. The station is located on the Toulouse – Bayonne railway line. The station is served by TER (local) services operated by the SNCF.

== Train services ==
The station is served by regional trains towards Bordeaux, Bayonne, Pau and Tarbes.

Preceding station	TER Nouvelle-Aquitaine	Following station
Pau towards Bordeaux	52	Coarraze-Nay towards Tarbes
Pau towards Bayonne	53	Coarraze-Nay towards Tarbes
