= Tournay station =

Railway station in Tournay, France

Coordinates: 43°11′00″N 0°14′21″E

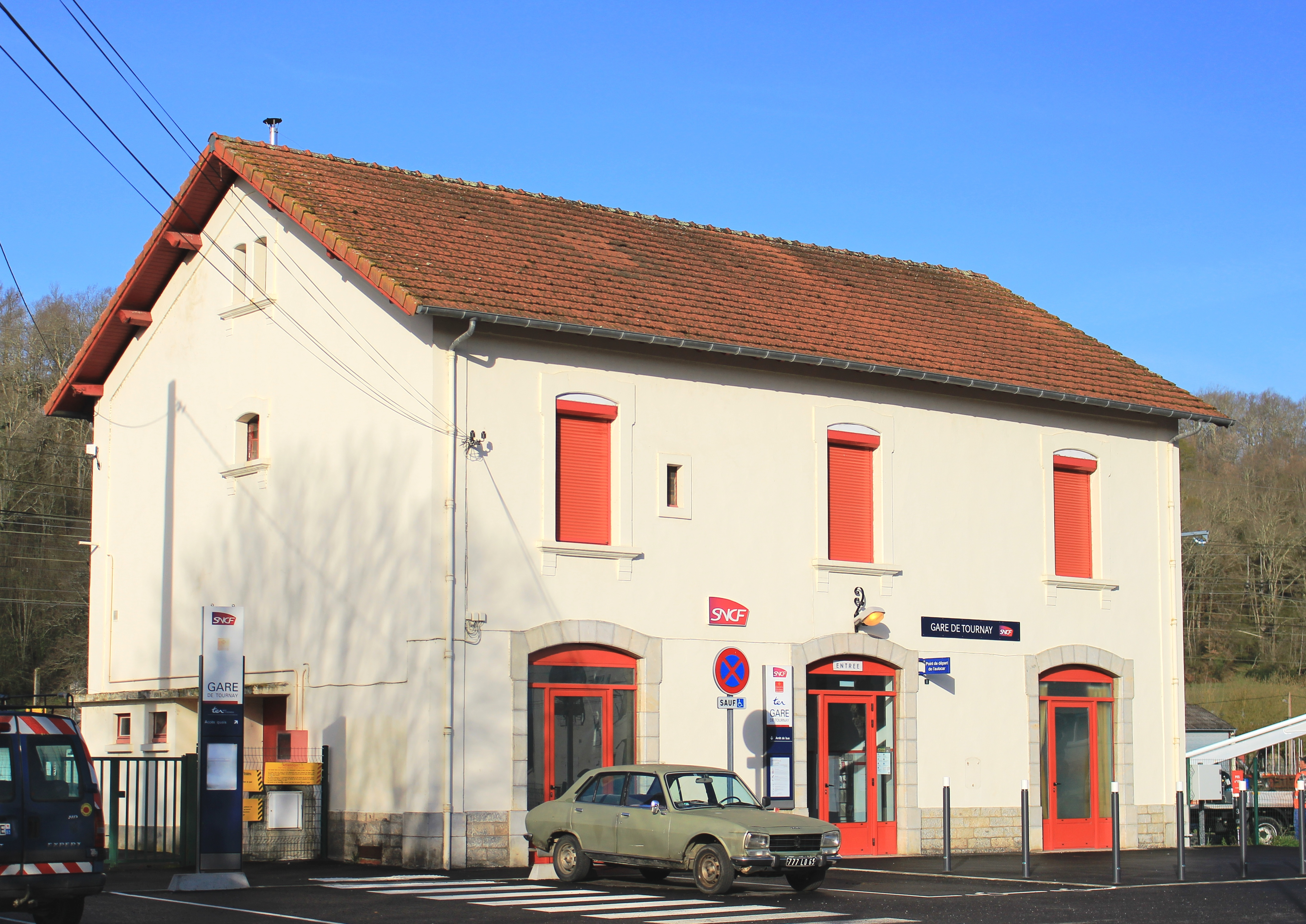
Tournay train station

Tournay is a railway station in Tournay, Occitanie, France. The station is on the Toulouse–Bayonne railway line. The station is served by TER (local) services operated by the SNCF.

== Train services ==
The following services currently call at Tournay:

- local service (TER Occitanie) Toulouse–Saint-Gaudens–Tarbes–Pau

Preceding station	TER Occitanie	Following station
Tarbes towards Pau	15	Capvern towards Toulouse
