= Coarraze-Nay =

Coarraze-Nay is the double-barreled name often used for two nearby towns located in Pyrénées-Atlantiques department of the Aquitaine region of France, in the former province of Béarn:

- Coarraze
- Nay
