= Urt station =

Railway station in Urt, France

Coordinates: 43°29′57″N 1°18′00″W

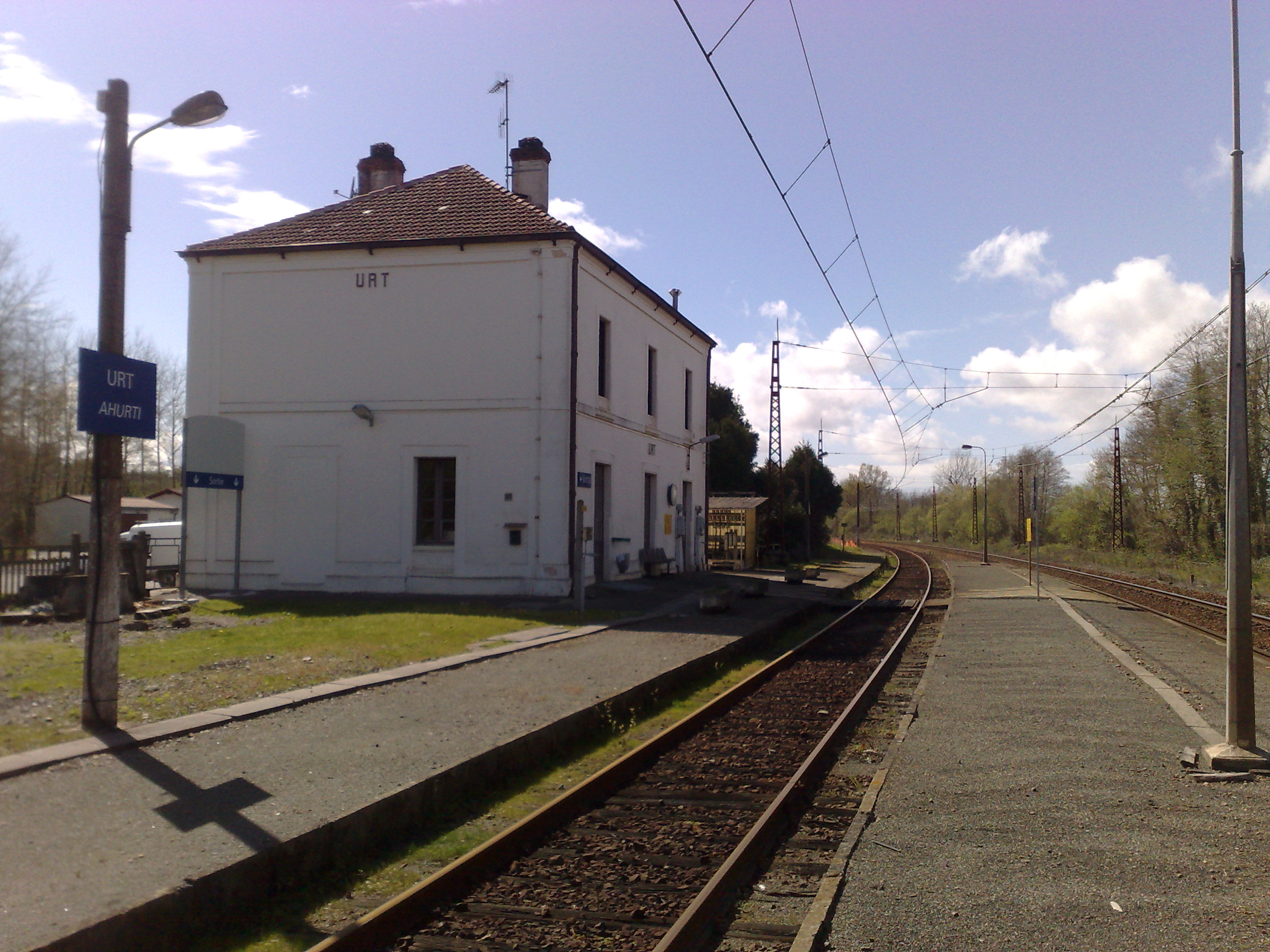
Urt station

Urt is a railway station in Urt, Nouvelle-Aquitaine, France. The station is located on the Toulouse - Bayonne railway line. The station is served by TER (local) services operated by the SNCF.

== Train services ==
The following services currently call at Urt:

- local service (TER Nouvelle-Aquitaine) Bayonne - Pau - Tarbes

Preceding station	TER Nouvelle-Aquitaine	Following station
Bayonne Terminus	53	Peyrehorade towards Tarbes
