= Artix station =

Railway station in Artix, France

Coordinates: 43°23′33″N 0°34′10″W

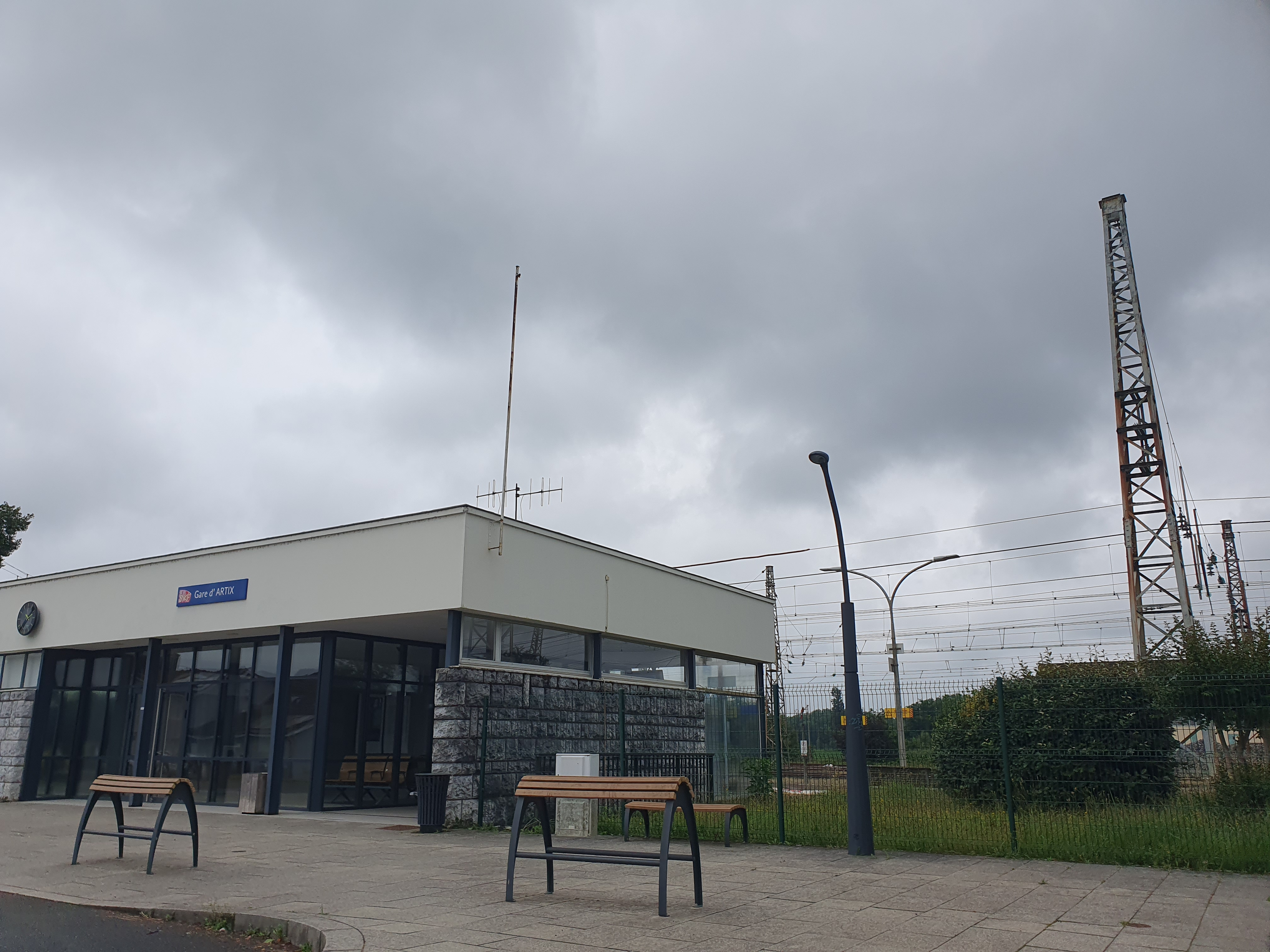

Artix is a railway station in Artix, Nouvelle-Aquitaine, France. The station is located on the Toulouse - Bayonne railway line. The station is served by TER (local) services operated by the SNCF.

== Train services ==
The following services currently call at Artix:

- local service (TER Nouvelle-Aquitaine) Bordeaux - Dax - Pau - Tarbes
- local service (TER Nouvelle-Aquitaine) Bayonne - Pau - Tarbes

Preceding station	TER Nouvelle-Aquitaine	Following station
Orthez towards Bordeaux	52	Pau towards Tarbes
Orthez towards Bayonne	53	Pau towards Tarbes
