= Lannemezan station =

Railway station in Lannemezan, France

Coordinates: 43°06′50″N 0°23′15″E

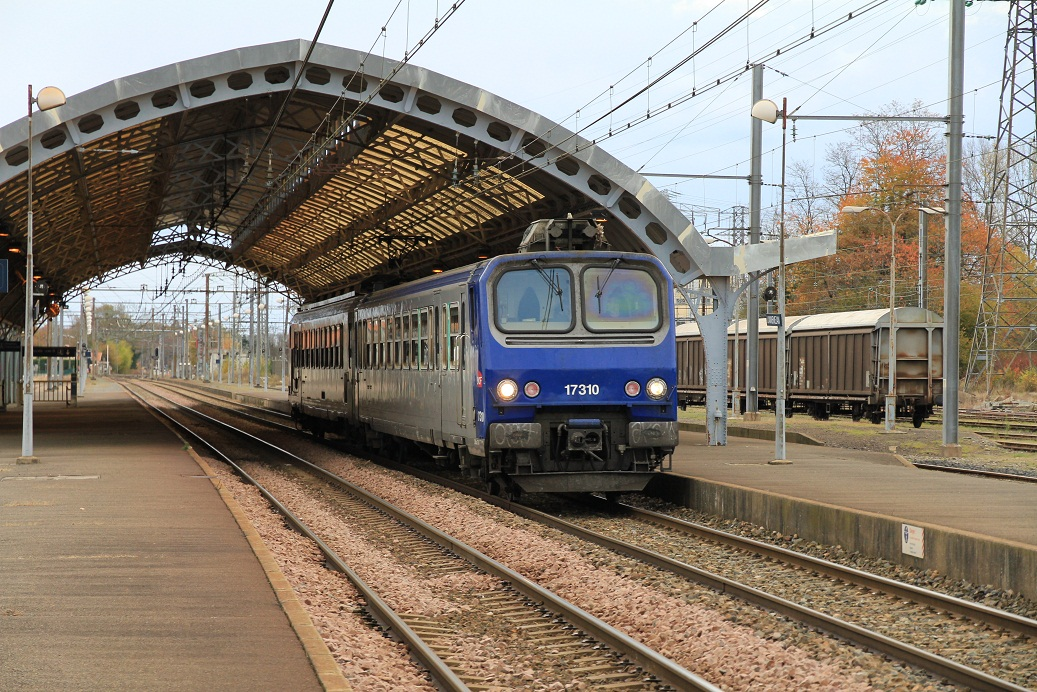
A SNCF Class Z 7300 at Lannemezan station

Lannemezan is a railway station in Lannemezan, Occitanie, France. The station is on the Toulouse–Bayonne railway line and the former Lannemezan–Arreau railway line. The station is served by Intercités (long distance) and TER (local) services operated by the SNCF.

== Train services ==
The following services currently call at Lannemezan:

- intercity services (Intercités) Hendaye–Bayonne–Pau–Tarbes–Toulouse
- local service (TER Occitanie) Toulouse–Saint-Gaudens–Tarbes–Pau

Preceding station	SNCF	Following station
Tarbes towards Hendaye	Intercités	Montréjeau-Gourdan-Polignan towards Toulouse
Preceding station	TER Occitanie	Following station
Capvern towards Pau	15	Montréjeau-Gourdan-Polignan towards Toulouse
