= Puyoô station =

Railway station in Puyoô, France

Coordinates: 43°31′28″N 0°54′36″W

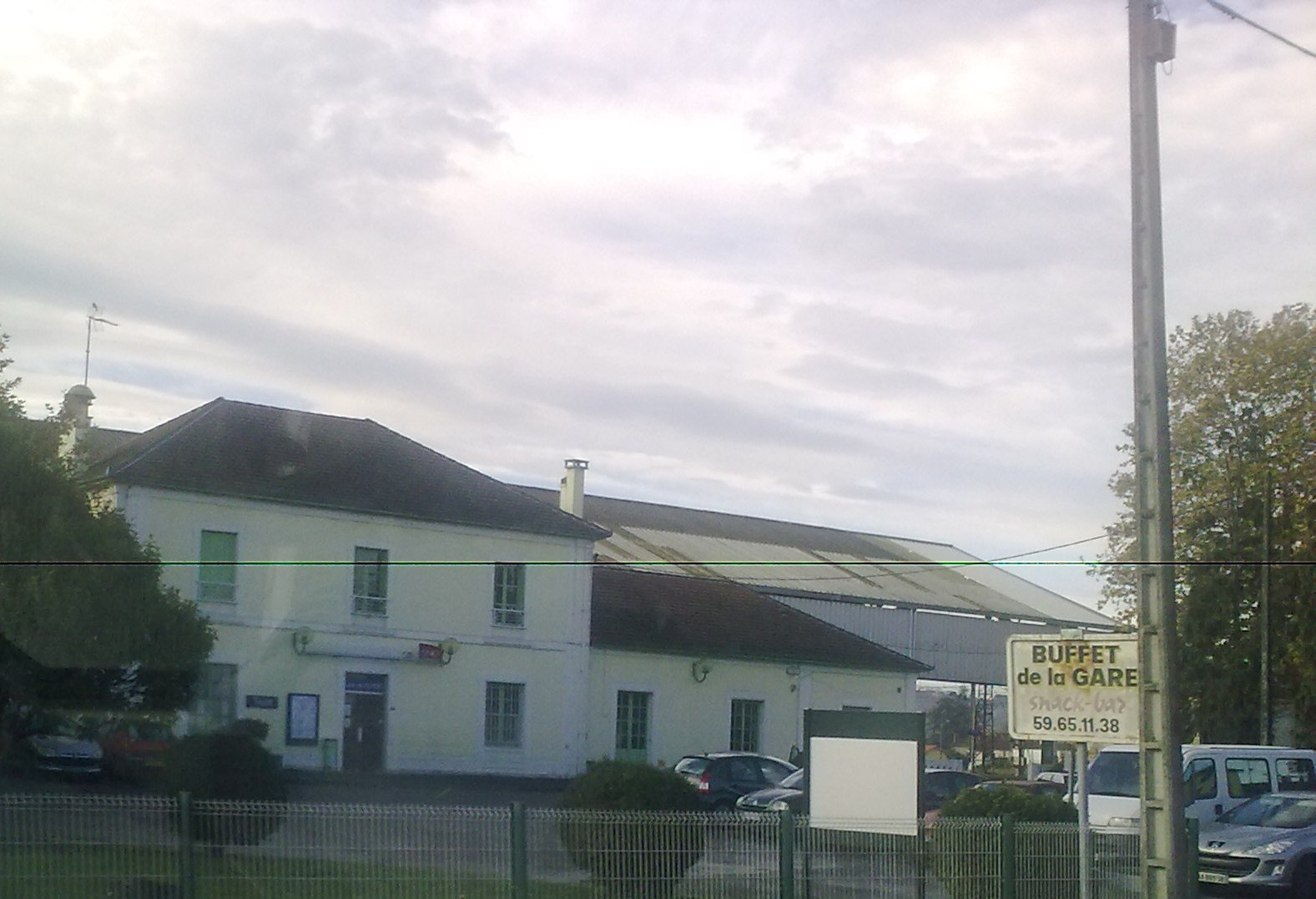
Puyoô station

Puyoô is a railway station in Puyoô, Pyrénées-Atlantiques département of France. The station, opened in 1862, is located on the Toulouse - Bayonne and Puyoô - Dax railway lines. Puyoô was also formerly served by the Puyoô to Mauléon railway line, which closed to passengers in 1968 and to freight in 1989, before being completely abandoned in 1991. This railway line also had a branch to Saint-Palais, which is also now closed.

Today, the station is served by Intercités (long distance) and TER (local) services operated by the SNCF.

== Train services ==
The following services currently call at Puyoô:

- local service (TER Nouvelle-Aquitaine) Bordeaux - Dax - Pau - Tarbes
- local service (TER Nouvelle-Aquitaine) Bayonne - Pau - Tarbes

| Preceding station | TER Nouvelle-Aquitaine | Following station |
|---|---|---|
| Dax towards Bordeaux | 52 | Orthez towards Tarbes |
| Peyrehorade towards Bayonne | 53 | Orthez towards Tarbes |
