= Orthez station =

Railway station in Orthez, France

Orthez
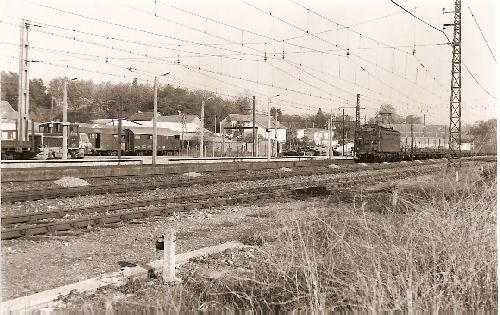
- An SNCF Class BB 4200 locomotive at the station in 1979

General information
- Location: Avenue de la gare, 64300; Orthez, France
- Coordinates: 43.4842°N 0.7675°W
- Elevation: 62 m (203 ft)
- Owner: RFF / SNCF
- Operator: SNCF
- Line: Toulouse–Bayonne

Other information
- Station code: 87672253

Services
Preceding station	SNCF	Following station
Bayonne towards Hendaye	Intercités	Pau towards Toulouse
Pau towards Paris-Austerlitz	Intercités (night)	Dax towards Hendaye
Preceding station	TER Nouvelle-Aquitaine	Following station
Puyoô towards Bordeaux	52	Artix towards Tarbes
Puyoô towards Bayonne	53	Artix towards Tarbes
Location

The gare d'Orthez is a railway station in Orthez, Nouvelle-Aquitaine, France. The station is located on the Toulouse - Bayonne railway line. The station is served by TGV (high speed trains), Intercités de Nuit (night trains), Intercités (long distance) and TER (local) services operated by the SNCF.

== Train services ==
The following services currently call at Orthez:

- intercity services (Intercités) Hendaye - Bayonne - Pau - Tarbes - Toulouse
- night services (Intercités de nuit) Hendaye - Bayonne - Dax - Pau - Tarbes - Les Aubrais - Paris
- local service (TER Nouvelle-Aquitaine) Bordeaux - Dax - Pau - Tarbes
- local service (TER Nouvelle-Aquitaine) Bayonne - Pau - Tarbes
