= Gan station =

Railway station in France

Coordinates: 43°14′03″N 0°23′28″W

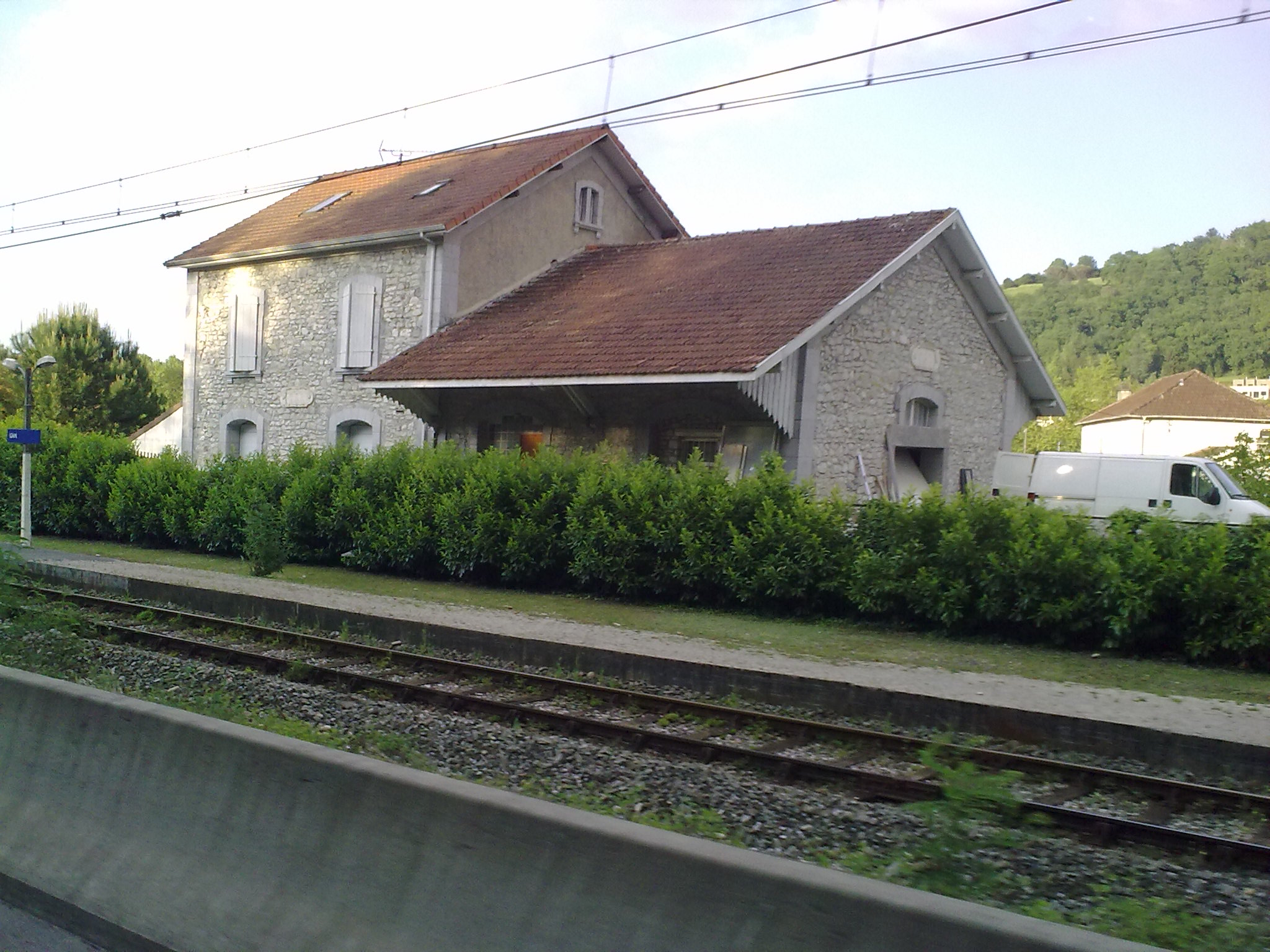
Gan railway station.

Gan is a railway station in Gan, Nouvelle-Aquitaine, France. The station is located on the Pau–Canfranc railway. The station is served by TER (local) services operated by the SNCF.

== Train services ==
The following services currently call at Gan:

- local service (TER Nouvelle-Aquitaine) Pau - Oloron-Sainte-Marie - Bedous

Preceding station	TER Nouvelle-Aquitaine	Following station
La Croix du Prince towards Pau	55	Buzy-en-Béarn towards Bedous
