= Dax station =

Railway station in Dax, France

Coordinates: 43°43′15″N 1°3′1″W

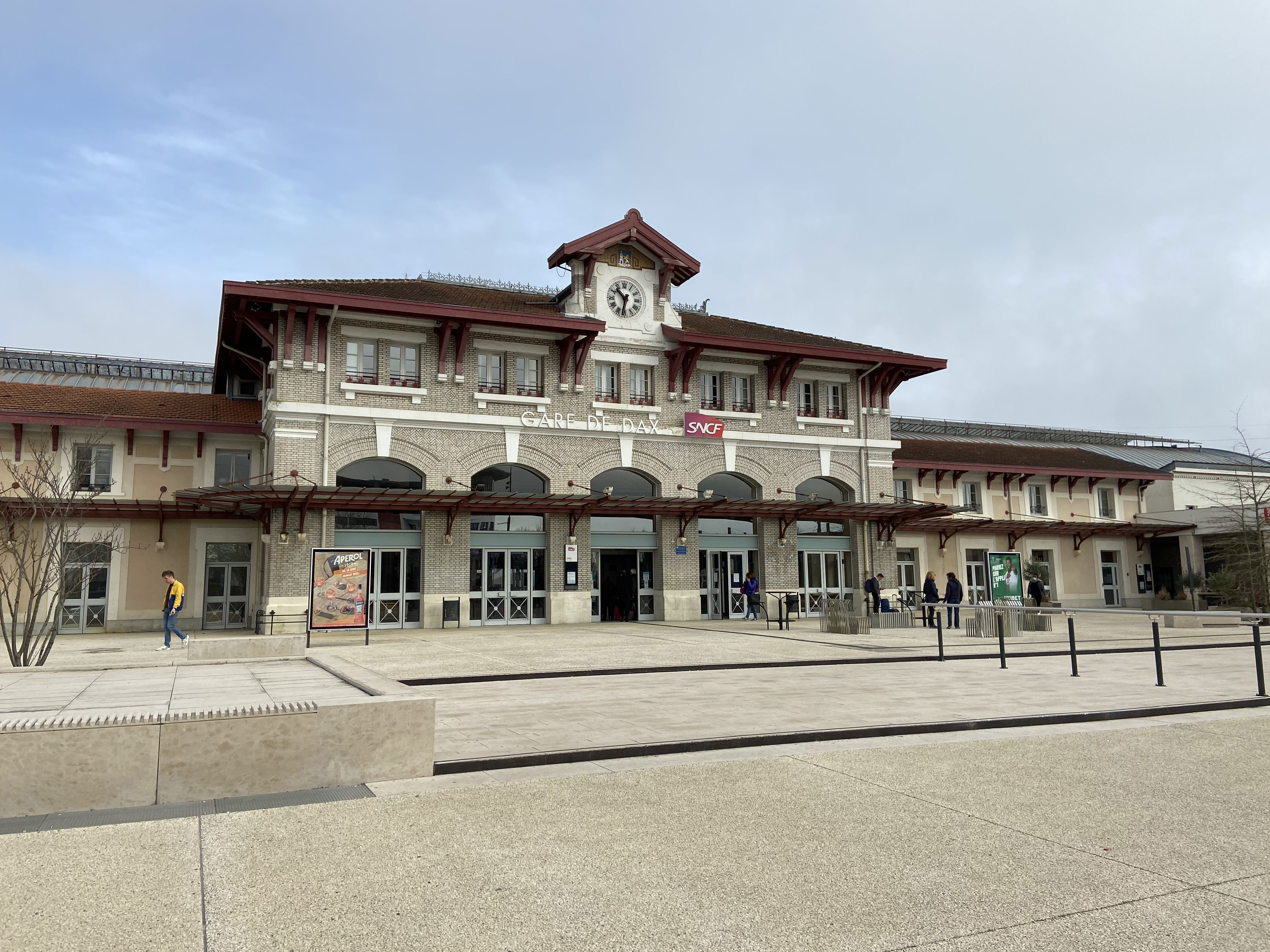
Entrance

Dax station is a railway station serving the town Dax, Landes department, southwestern France. It is situated on the Bordeaux–Irun railway and the Puyoô–Dax railway. The station is served by high speed trains to Paris, Hendaye and Tarbes, and regional trains towards Bordeaux, Bayonne and Pau.

Preceding station	SNCF	Following station
Bayonne towards Hendaye	TGV inOui	Bordeaux towards Montparnasse
Bordeaux towards Montparnasse	TGV inOui	Orthez towards Tarbes
Orthez towards Paris-Austerlitz	Intercités (night)	Bayonne towards Hendaye
Preceding station	TER Nouvelle-Aquitaine	Following station
Morcenx towards Bordeaux	51	Saubusse-les-Bains towards Hendaye
Morcenx towards Bordeaux	52	Puyoô towards Tarbes
