= Gan, Pyrénées-Atlantiques =

Gan
- Commune
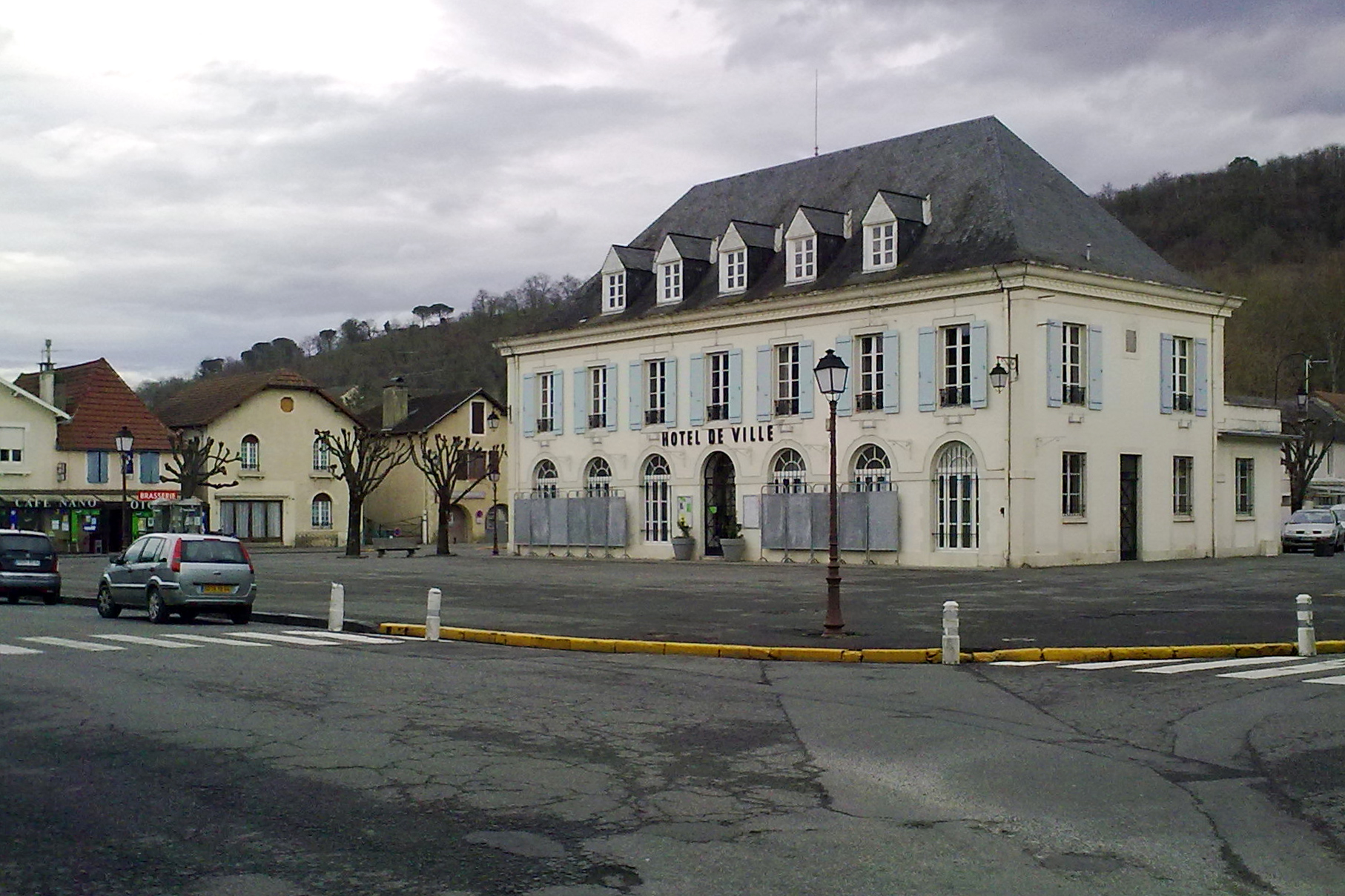
- The town hall of Gan

- Coat of arms
- Location of Gan
- Location within France Location within Nouvelle-Aquitaine
- Coordinates: 43°13′46″N 0°23′11″W
- Country: France
- Region: Nouvelle-Aquitaine
- Department: Pyrénées-Atlantiques
- Arrondissement: Pau
- Canton: Ouzom, Gave et Rives du Neez
- Intercommunality: CA Pau Béarn Pyrénées

Government
  - Mayor (2020–2026): Francis Pèes
- Area^{1}: 39.62 km^{2} (15.30 sq mi)
- Elevation: 202 m (663 ft)
- Highest elevation: 478 m (1,568 ft)
- Lowest elevation: 186 m (610 ft)
- Population (2023): 5,676
  - Density: 143.3/km^{2} (371.0/sq mi)
- Time zone: UTC+01:00 (CET)
  - Summer (DST): UTC+02:00 (CEST)
- INSEE/Postal code: 64230 /64290
- Website: gan.pau.fr
- ^{1} French Land Register data, which excludes lakes, ponds, glaciers > 1 km^{2} (0.386 sq mi or 247 acres) and river estuaries.

Gan (French pronunciation: [ɡɑ̃]; Occitan: Gant) is a commune located in the Pyrénées-Atlantiques department, in the south-west of France. Gan station has rail connections to Pau, Oloron-Sainte-Marie and Bedous.

Its mayor has been Francis Pèes (right wing; also Vice President of the Communauté d'agglomération de Pau-Pyrénées) since 2014, a former CEO of a construction company.

== Population ==
Historical population
| Year | Pop. | ±% p.a. |
|---|---|---|
| 1968 | 3,125 | — |
| 1975 | 3,543 | +1.81% |
| 1982 | 4,047 | +1.92% |
| 1990 | 4,724 | +1.95% |
| 1999 | 4,971 | +0.57% |
| 2007 | 5,225 | +0.62% |
| 2012 | 5,517 | +1.09% |
| 2017 | 5,510 | −0.03% |
| 2023 | 5,676 | +0.50% |
Source: INSEE

== See also ==
- Communes of the Pyrénées-Atlantiques department
