= La Croix du Prince station =

Railway station in Pau, France

Coordinates: 43°17′08″N 0°22′44″W

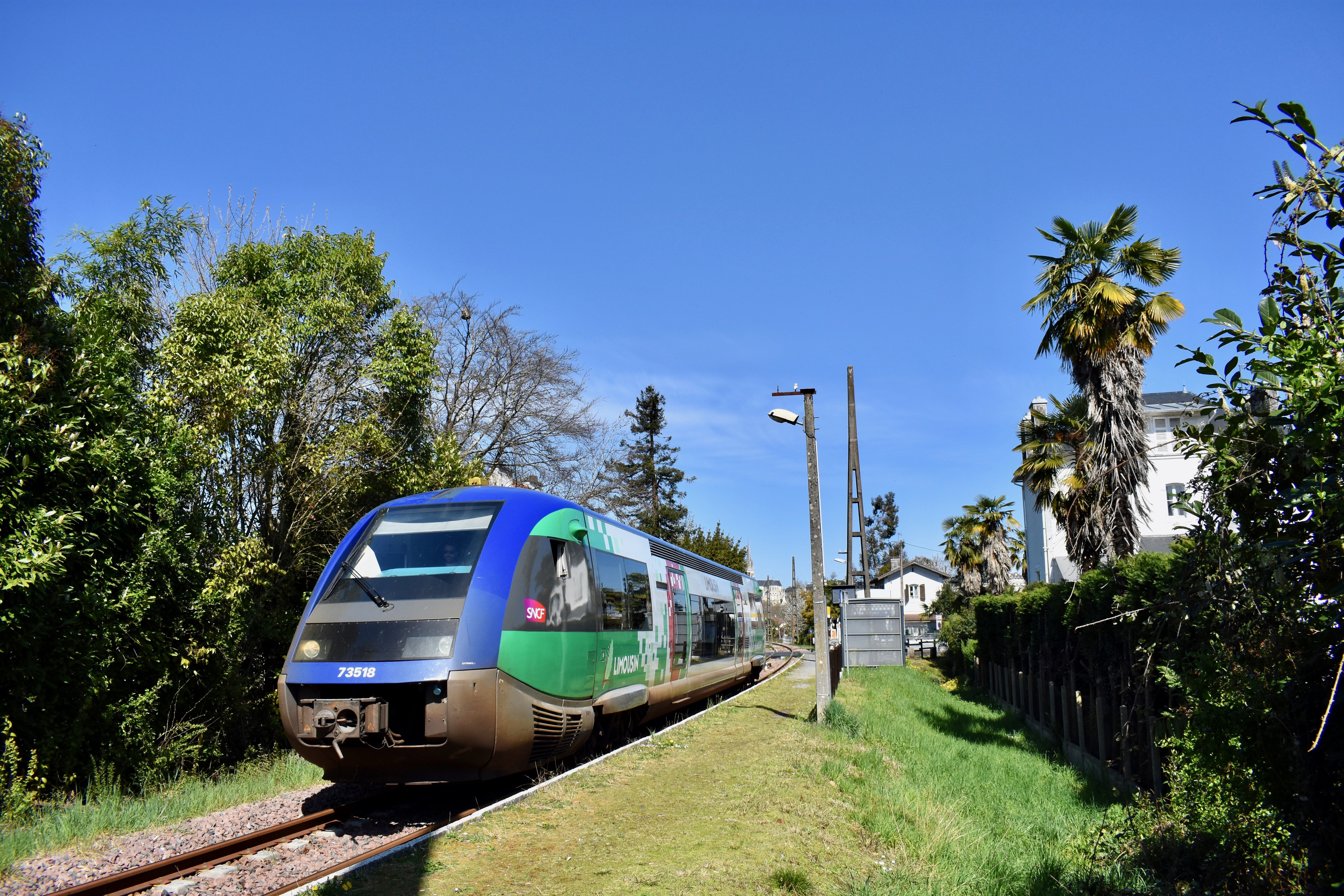
X73500 at La Croix-du-Prince station

La Croix du Prince is a railway station in Pau, Nouvelle-Aquitaine, France, located on the Pau–Canfranc railway line. It is served by TER (local) services operated by the SNCF.

== Train services ==
The following services currently call at La Croix du Prince:

- local service (TER Nouvelle-Aquitaine) Pau - Oloron-Sainte-Marie - Bedous

Preceding station	TER Nouvelle-Aquitaine	Following station
Pau Terminus	55	Gan towards Bedous
