= Funiculaire de Pau =

Funicular railway in Pau, France

Coordinates: 43°17′34.43″N 0°22′12.94″W

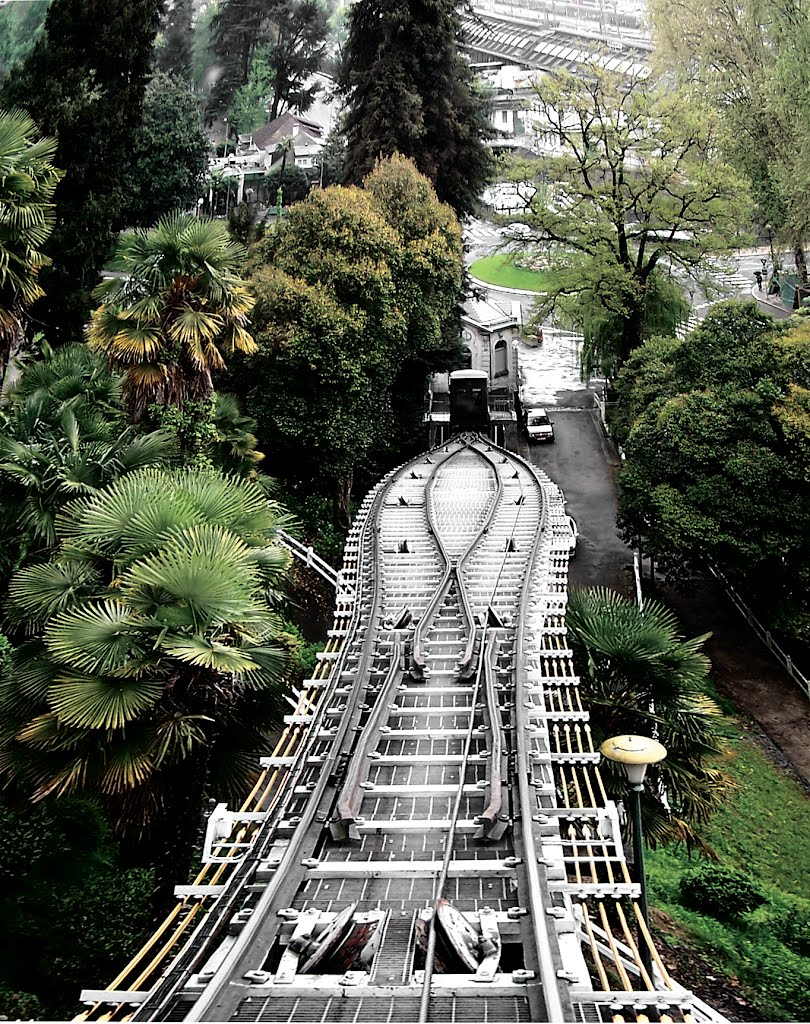

Overview
- Status: Open
- Owner: City of Pau
- Locale: Pau, France
- Stations: 2

History
- Opened: 1907

Technical
- Line length: 103 m (338 ft)
- Track gauge: 1,000 mm (3 ft 3 3/8 in)
- Maximum incline: 30%

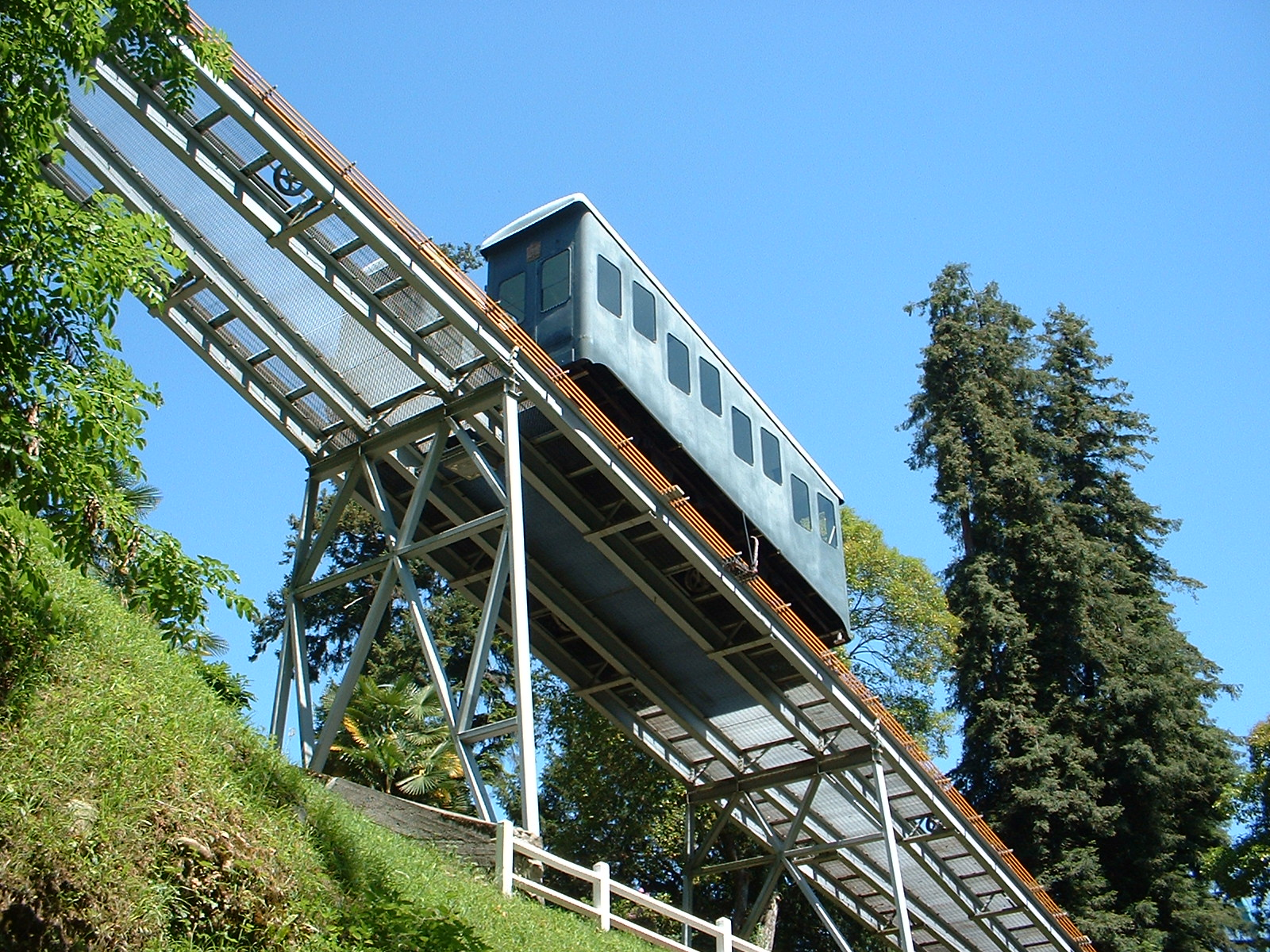
The railway from below

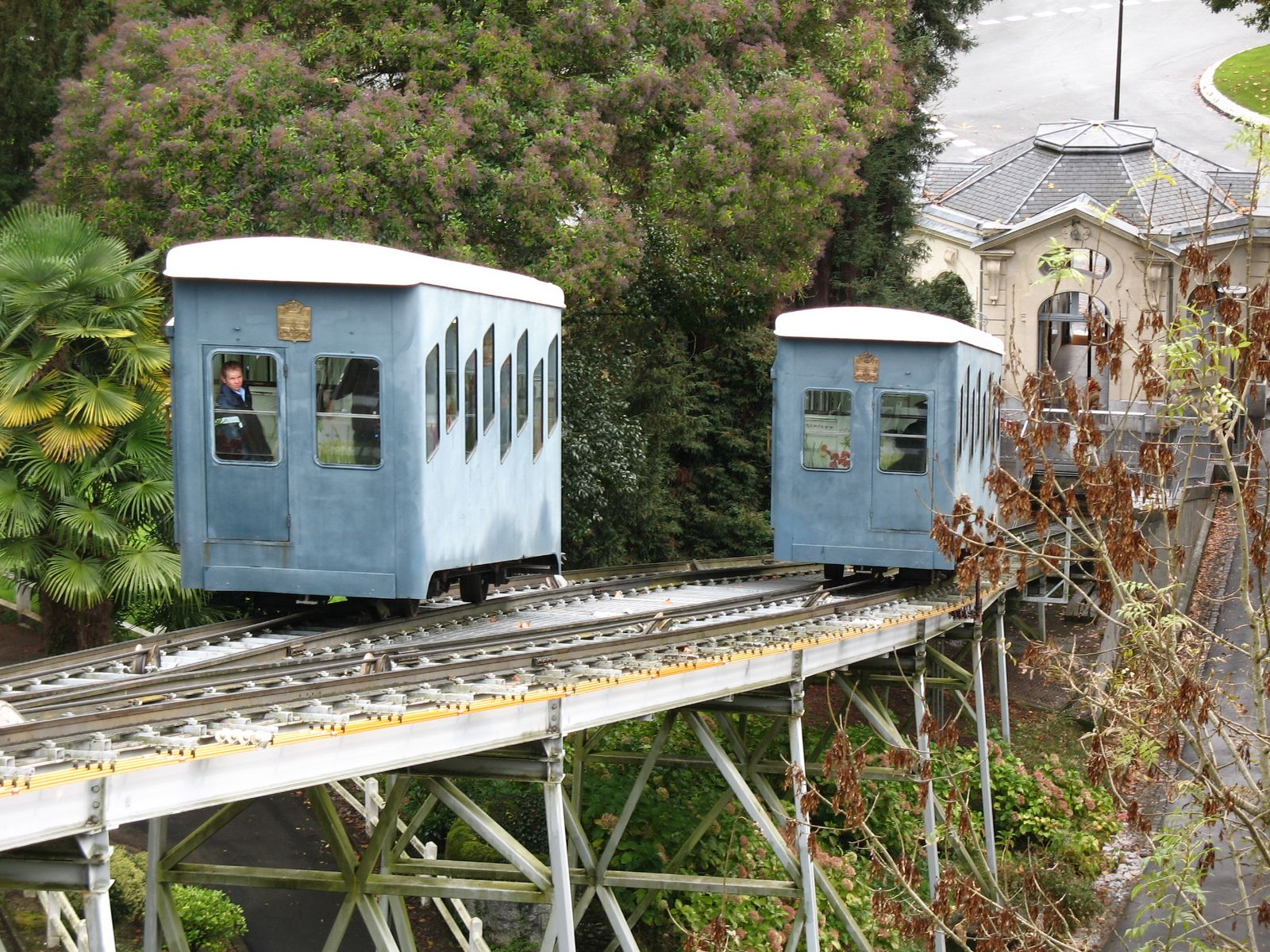
Cars at the passing loop

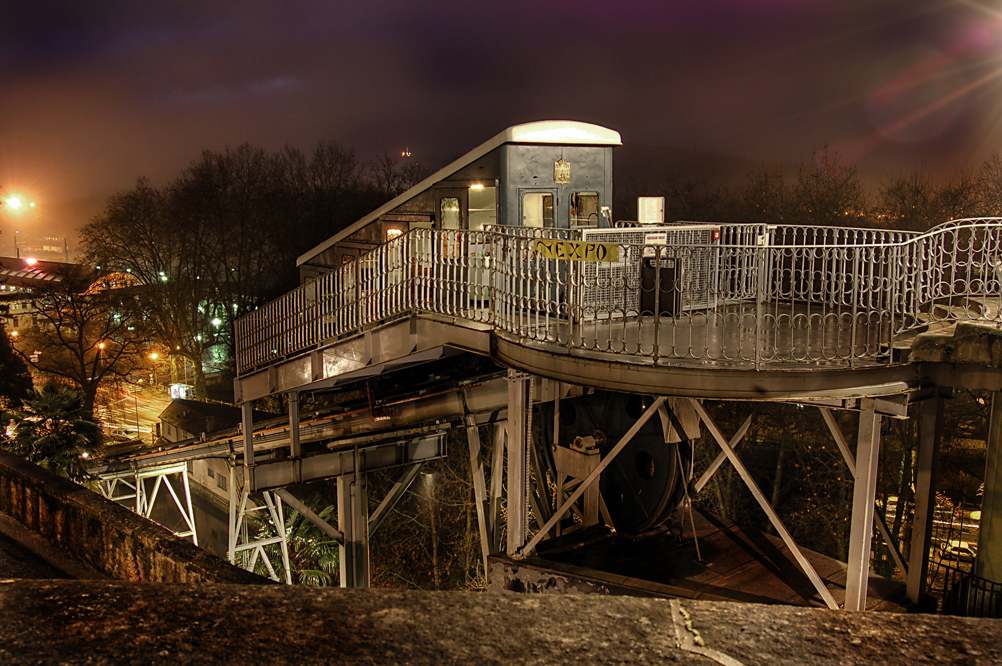
The upper station at night

The Funiculaire de Pau, or Pau Funicular, is a funicular railway in the city of Pau in the Pyrénées-Atlantiques département of southwestern France. It links the Boulevard des Pyrénées, on the level of the city centre and the Château de Pau, to Pau railway station in the valley of the Gave de Pau below.

== History ==
The railway arrived in Pau in 1863, but it was not until 1885 that construction of a funicular was first suggested. The decision to construct the line was taken in 1906, and the funicular was brought into service in 1908.

The line was closed from 1951 to 1954, and in 1961, for renewal of its equipment. In 1970, it was taken out of service for safety reasons and because of lack of patronage. In 1978 the municipality decided to keep the heritage infrastructure, renovate it and bring it back into service, with the line being made free of fare.

Further inspections and renovations took place in 1995, 2006 and 2010. During the latest renovations, changes were made to make the line accessible to persons of reduced mobility. The current cabins date from 1961.

== Operation ==
The funicular is free to use, and operates from 06:15 to 21:00 on Mondays to Saturday, and in the afternoons on Sundays and public holidays. It is run by the city council, and carries some 500,000 passengers a year, with a monthly peak of 50,000 passengers and a daily average of 1,500 people.

The line has the following technical parameters:

Number of cars	2
Number of stops	2
Configuration	Single track with passing loop
Track length	103 metres (338 ft)
Rise	26 metres (85 ft)
Maximum gradient	30%
Capacity	30 passengers per car
Frequency	Every 3 minutes
Maximum speed	1.5 metres per second (4.9 ft/s)

== See also ==
- List of funicular railways
