= Coarraze =

- Commune
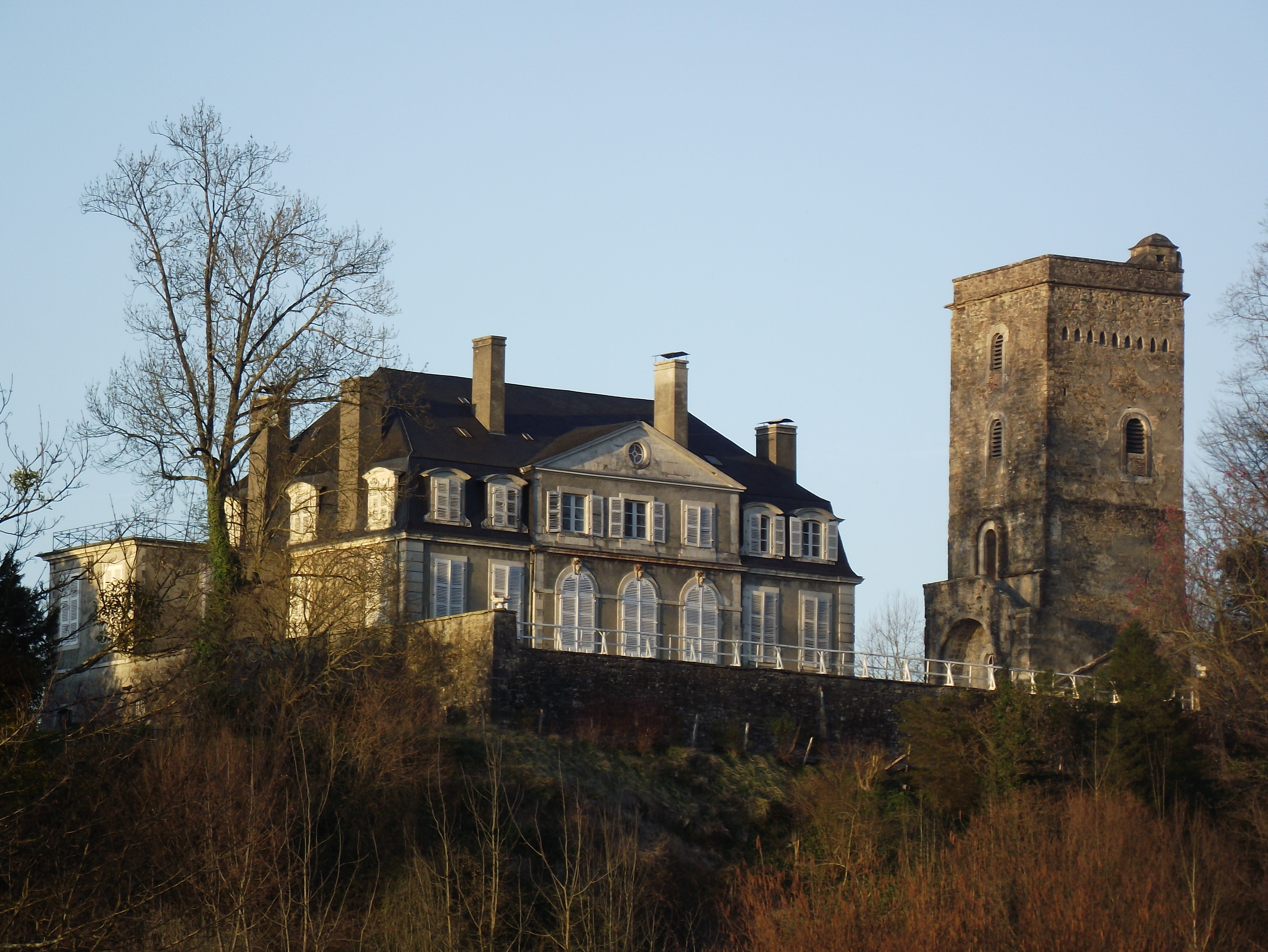
- The château of Coarraze

- Coat of arms
- Location of Coarraze
- Location within France Location within Nouvelle-Aquitaine
- Coordinates: 43°10′16″N 0°13′44″W
- Country: France
- Region: Nouvelle-Aquitaine
- Department: Pyrénées-Atlantiques
- Arrondissement: Pau
- Canton: Vallées de l'Ousse et du Lagoin

Government
  - Mayor (2020–2026): Michel Lucante
- Area^{1}: 14.84 km^{2} (5.73 sq mi)
- Elevation: 274 m (899 ft)
- Highest elevation: 450 m (1,480 ft)
- Lowest elevation: 258 m (846 ft)
- Population (2023): 2,177
  - Density: 146.7/km^{2} (379.9/sq mi)
- Time zone: UTC+01:00 (CET)
  - Summer (DST): UTC+02:00 (CEST)
- INSEE/Postal code: 64191 /64800
- ^{1} French Land Register data, which excludes lakes, ponds, glaciers > 1 km^{2} (0.386 sq mi or 247 acres) and river estuaries.

Coarraze (French pronunciation: [kɔaʁaz]; Occitan: Coarrasa) is a commune in the Pyrénées-Atlantiques department in south-western France. It lies in the former province of Béarn.

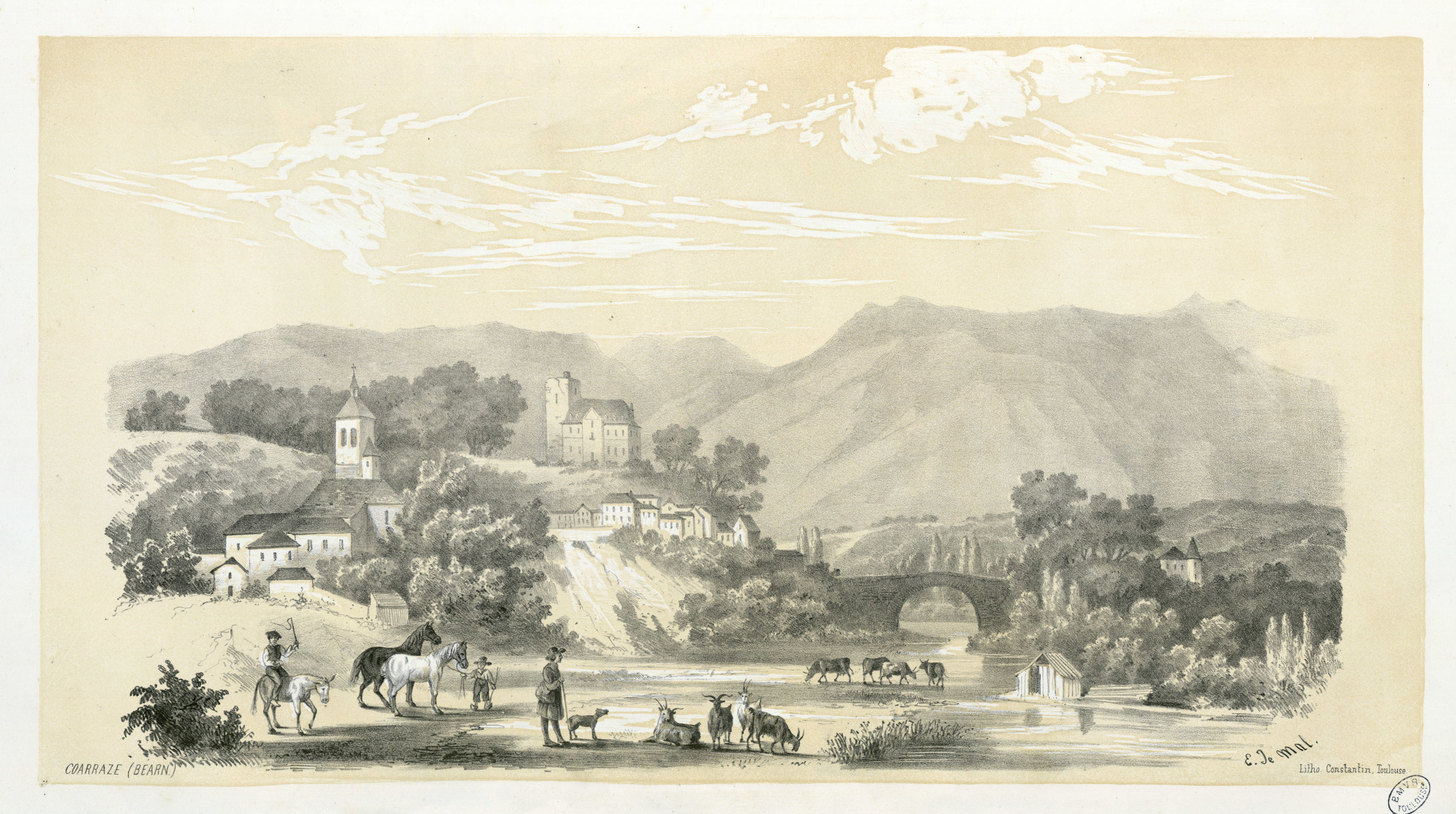
Coarraze in 1843 by Eugène de Malbos.

Due to its proximity to the town of Nay it is often normally referred to with the double barreled name "Coarraze-Nay" (such as its use in "Union sportive Coarraze Nay" or the SNCF train station "Coarraze-Nay"). Coarraze-Nay station has rail connections to Tarbes, Pau, Bordeaux and Bayonne.

== Population ==
Historical population
Year	Pop.	±% p.a.
1968	1,940	—
1975	1,949	+0.07%
1982	2,202	+1.76%
1990	2,047	−0.91%
1999	2,068	+0.11%
2007	2,109	+0.25%
2012	2,094	−0.14%
2017	2,176	+0.77%
2023	2,177	+0.01%
Source: INSEE

== See also ==
- Communes of the Pyrénées-Atlantiques department
