= Boulevard des Pyrénées =

Street in Pau, France

Coordinates: 43.293396°N 0.368761°W

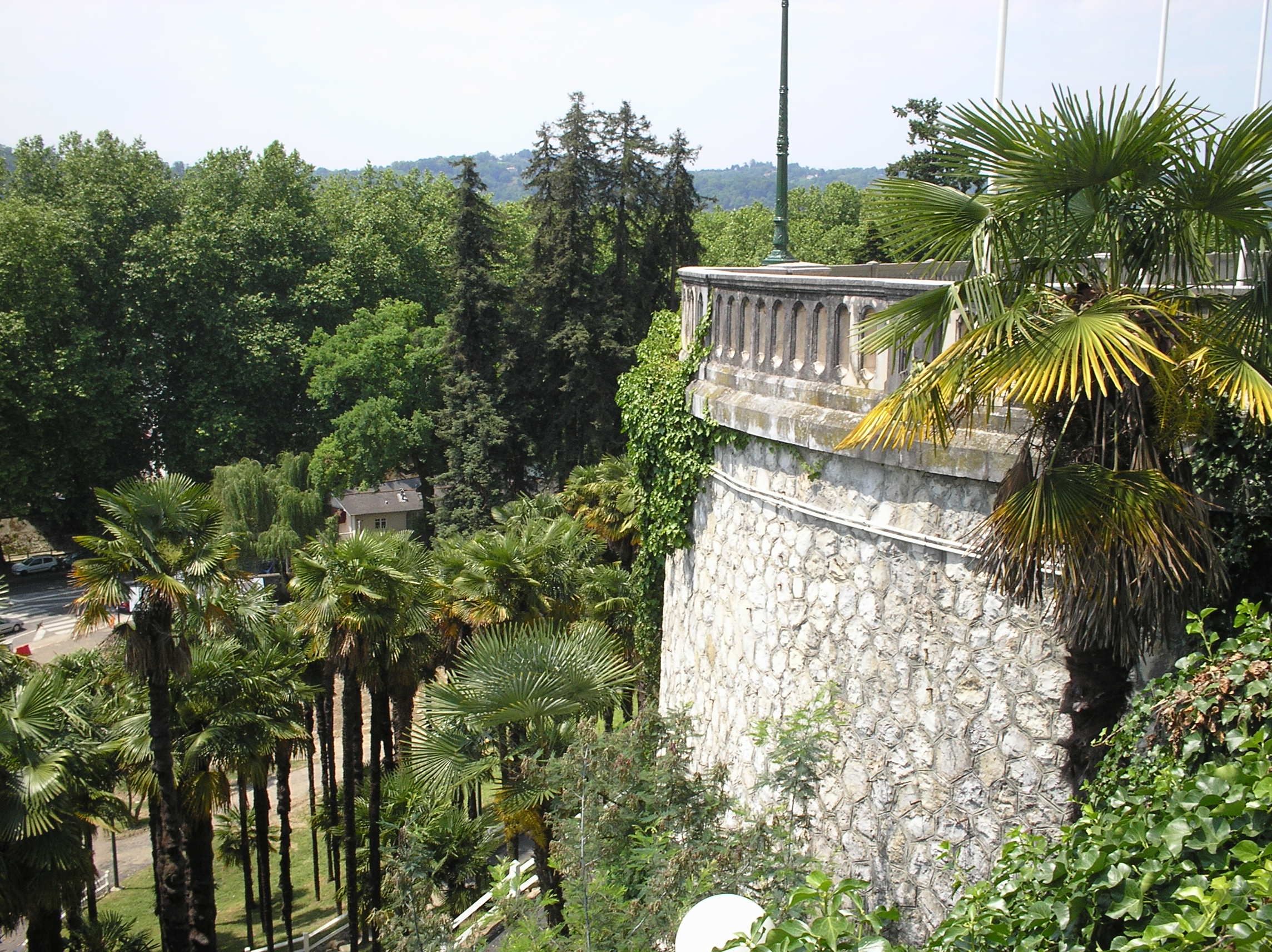
Detail of the terrace supporting the boulevard, and the gardens below.

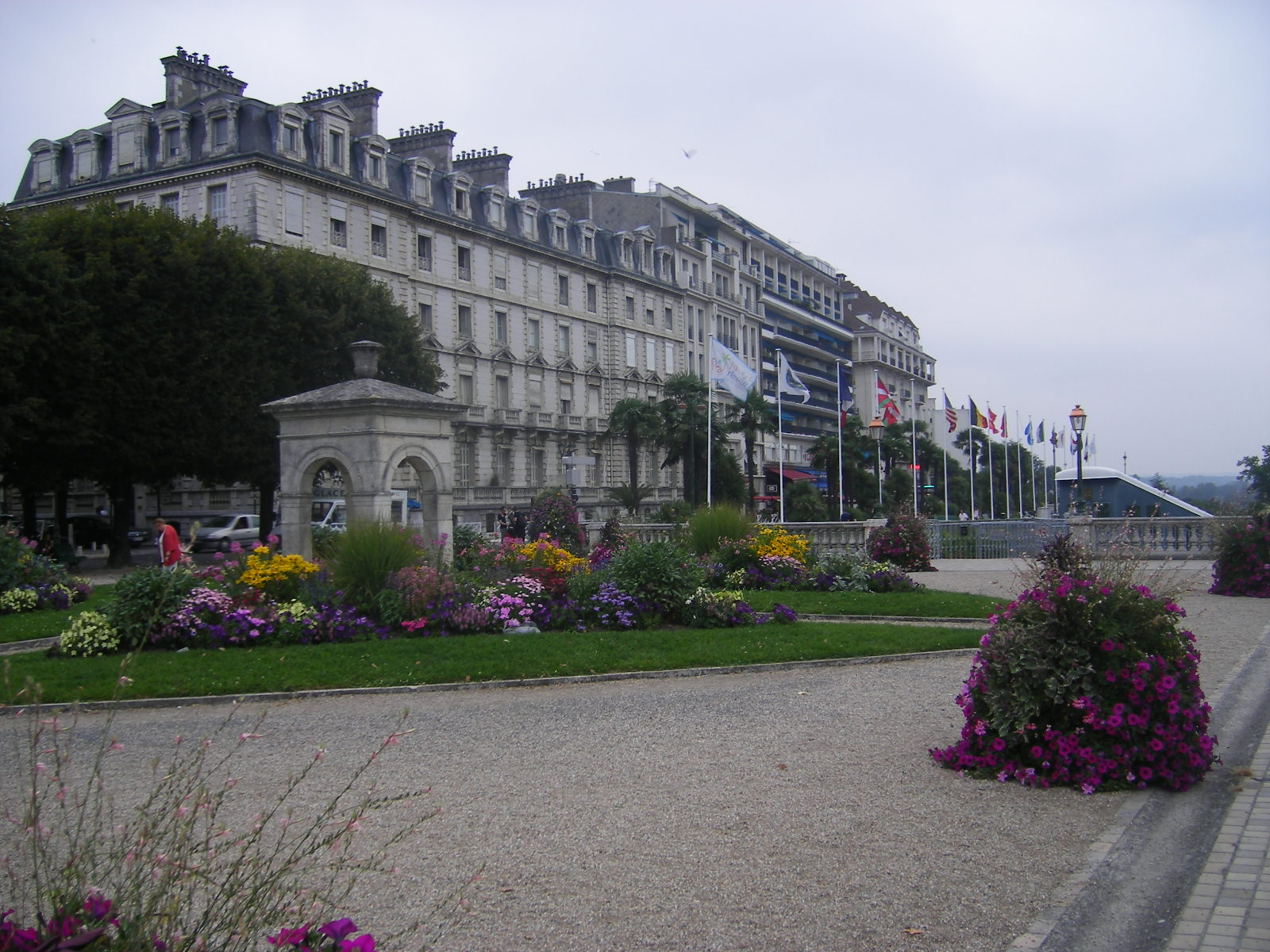
Buildings lining the northern side of the boulevard.

The Boulevard des Pyrénées (French pronunciation: [bulvaʁ de piʁene]) is a boulevard in the town of Pau in the Pyrénées-Atlantiques département of south-west France. With buildings on its northern side only, and a terrace overlooking the valley of the Gave de Pau to its south, the boulevard is notable for its panoramic view of the peaks of the Pyrenees some 50 km to the south.

The boulevard was created at the suggestion of Napoleon I, and overlooks terraced gardens cascading down the valley side. In clear weather, especially early morning or late evening and in winter, the view stretches from the Pic du Midi de Bigorre to the Pic d'Anie, with the Pic du Midi d'Ossau standing out in the background. Along the railings on the terrace side of the boulevard are plaques pointing out and describing each mountain.

The boulevard runs for some three-quarters of a kilometer, linking the Parc du Beaumont to the Château de Pau and forming the southern edge of the town centre. From its centre, adjacent to the Place Royale, the Funiculaire de Pau descends to the valley bottom, linking the town centre to Pau railway station.
