= Bearnese =

Bearnese refers to anything of or relating to Béarn, especially the Bearnais people meaning native of Béarn, and may refer directly to the following articles:

- Béarnese dialect
- Béarnaise sauce
- Béarnaise cattle
- Basco-béarnaise, a type of sheep
