= Pau station =

Railway station in Pau, France

Pau
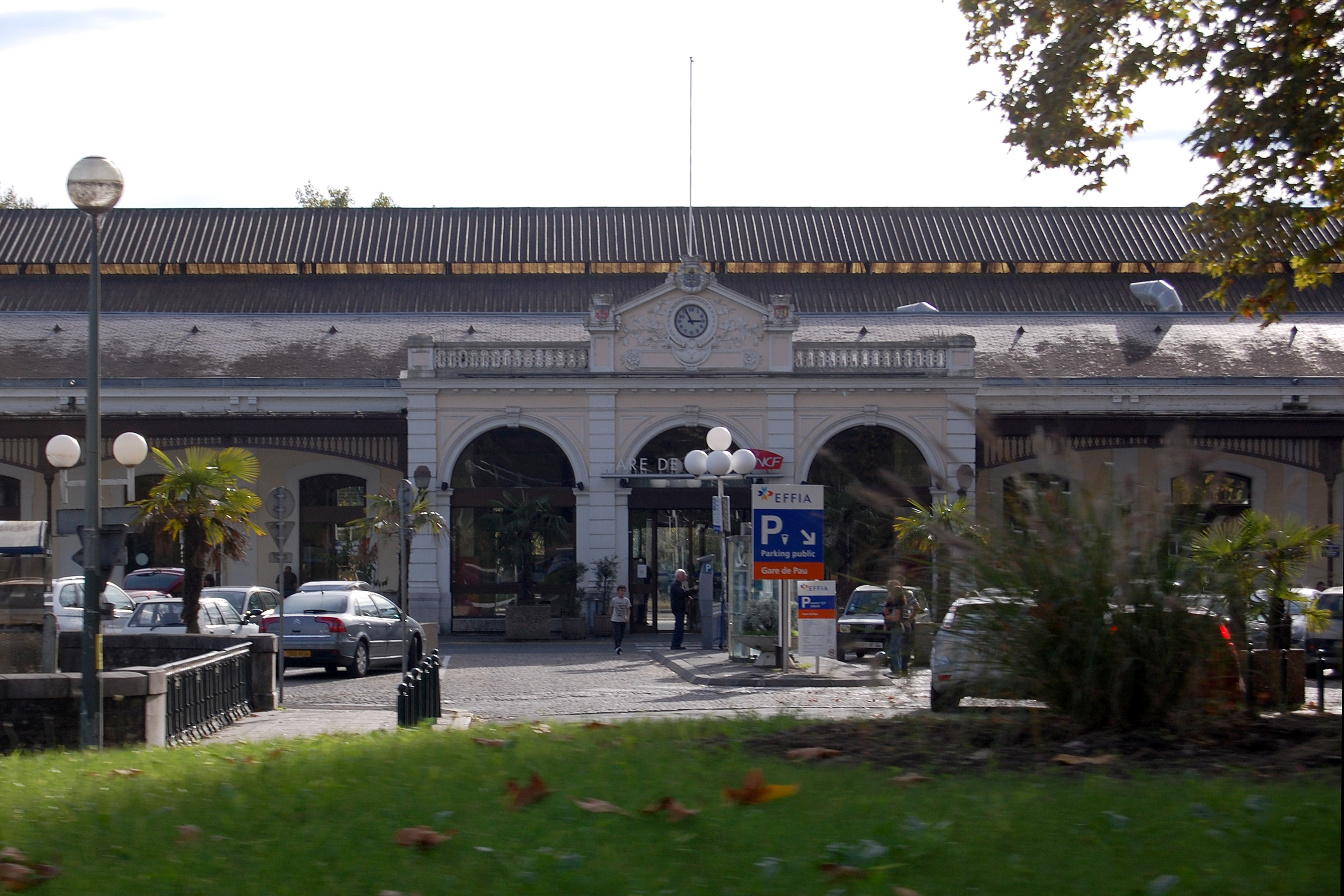
- Exterior of the Gare de Pau

General information
- Location: Avenue Jean Biray 64000; Pau; France
- Coordinates: 43.2914°N 0.3694°W
- Elevation: 177 m (581 ft)
- Owner: RFF / SNCF
- Operator: SNCF
- Lines: Toulouse–Bayonne; Pau–Canfranc

Other information
- Station code: 87672006

History
- Opened: 4 March 1863

Passengers
- 2024: 1,482,868
Services
Preceding station	SNCF	Following station
Orthez towards Hendaye	Intercités	Lourdes towards Toulouse
Lourdes towards Paris-Austerlitz	Intercités (night)	Orthez towards Hendaye
Preceding station	TER Nouvelle-Aquitaine	Following station
Artix towards Bordeaux	52	Assat towards Tarbes
Artix towards Bayonne	53	Assat towards Tarbes
Terminus	55	La Croix du Prince towards Bedous
Preceding station	TER Occitanie	Following station
Terminus	15	Coarraze-Nay towards Toulouse
Location

The gare de Pau is a railway station in Pau, Nouvelle-Aquitaine, France. The station is located on the Toulouse-Bayonne and Pau-Canfranc railway lines. The station is served by TGV (high speed trains), Intercités de Nuit (night trains), Intercités (long distance) and TER (local) services operated by the SNCF.

The station is situated in the valley of the Gave de Pau, some 30 metres (98 ft) below the city centre. It is linked to the city centre by the Funiculaire de Pau, which climbs out of the valley to the Boulevard des Pyrénées and Place Royale. It is also served by buses and taxis.

== Train services ==
The following services currently call at Pau:

- TGV services Paris - Saint-Pierre-des-Corps - Bordeaux - Dax - Pau - Tarbes
- intercity services (Intercités) Hendaye - Bayonne - Pau - Tarbes - Toulouse
- local service (TER Nouvelle-Aquitaine) Bordeaux - Dax - Pau - Tarbes
- local service (TER Nouvelle-Aquitaine) Bayonne - Pau - Tarbes
- local service (TER Nouvelle-Aquitaine) Pau - Oloron-Sainte-Marie - Bedous
- local service (TER Occitanie) Toulouse - Saint-Gaudens - Tarbes - Pau

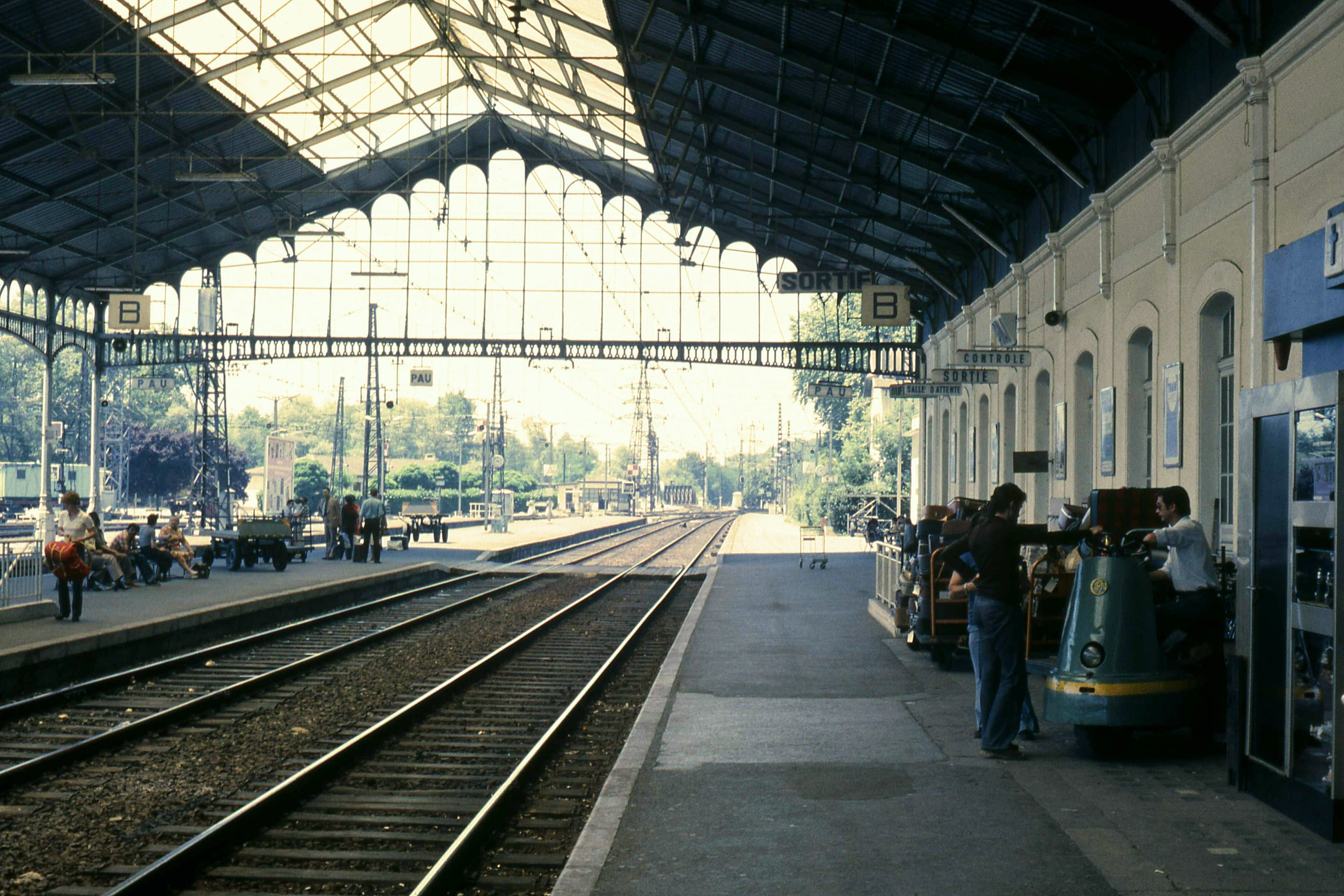
Interior of the Gare de Pau
