= Bayonne station (Nouvelle-Aquitaine) =

Railway station in Bayonne, France

Bayonne
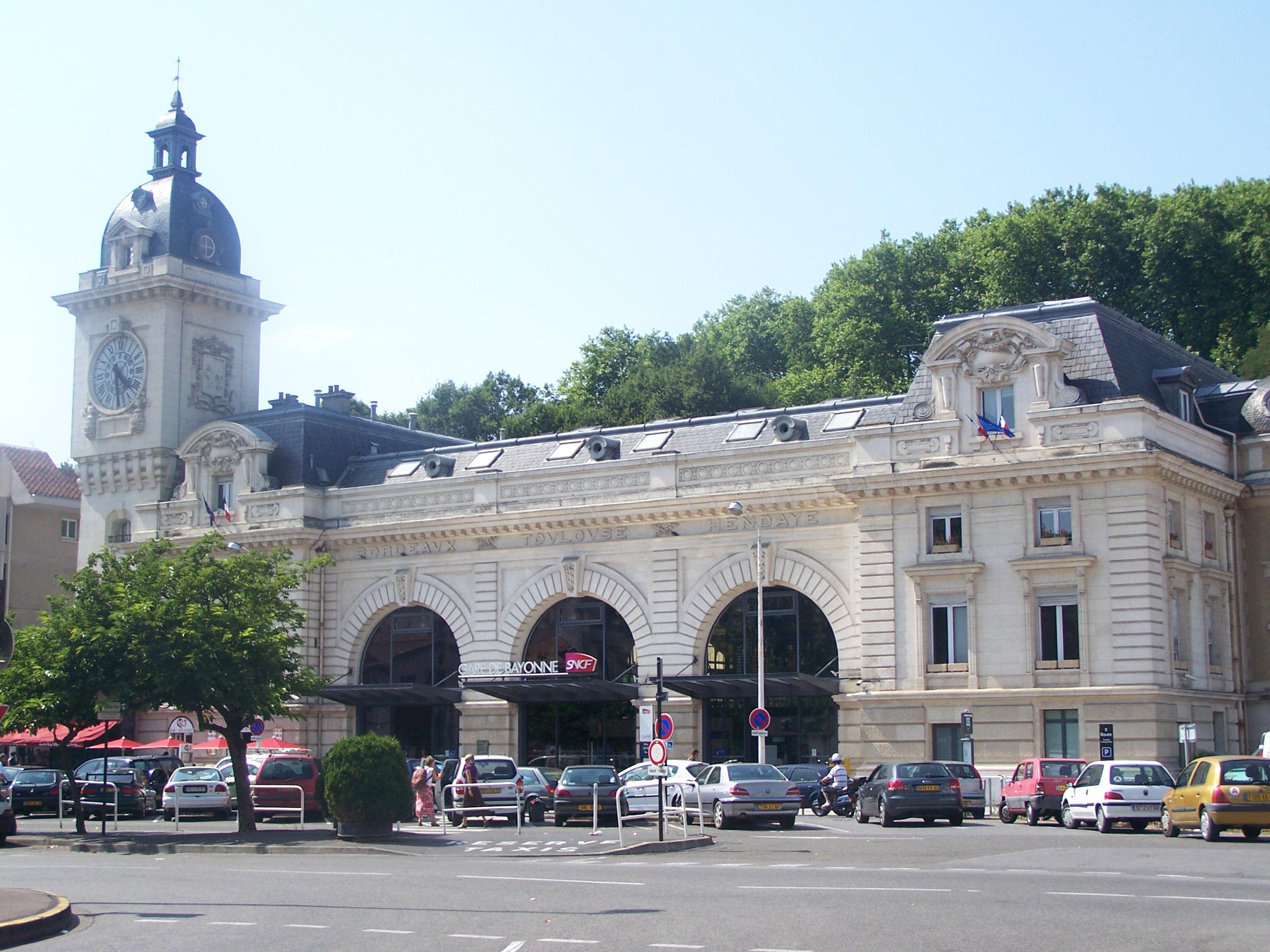
- The frontage of Bayonne railway station

General information
- Location: Place Pereire; Bayonne 64100; France
- Coordinates: 43.4971°N 1.4701°W
- Elevation: 5 m (16.4 ft)
- Owner: SNCF
- Operator: SNCF
- Lines: Bordeaux–Irun; Toulouse–Bayonne; Bayonne–Saint-Jean-Pied-de-Port; Bayonne–Allées-Marines

Other information
- Station code: 87673004

History
- Opened: 26 March 1855

Passengers
- 2024: 1,686,266
Services
Preceding station	SNCF	Following station
Biarritz towards Hendaye	TGV inOui	Dax towards Montparnasse
Biarritz towards Hendaye	Intercités	Orthez towards Toulouse
Dax towards Paris-Austerlitz	Intercités (night)	Biarritz towards Hendaye
Preceding station	TER Nouvelle-Aquitaine	Following station
Boucau towards Bordeaux	51	Biarritz towards Hendaye
Terminus	53	Urt towards Tarbes
Terminus	54	Villefranque towards Saint-Jean-Pied-de-Port
Terminus	54U	Villefranque towards Cambo-les-Bains
Location

Bayonne station (French: Gare de Bayonne) is a railway station in Bayonne, Nouvelle-Aquitaine, France. The station is located on the Bordeaux - Irun, Toulouse–Bayonne and Bayonne–Saint-Jean-Pied-de-Port railway lines. The station is served by TGV (high speed trains), Intercités de Nuit (night trains), Intercités (long distance) and TER (local) services operated by the SNCF.

== Train services ==
The following services currently call at Bayonne:

- high speed services (TGV) Paris - Bordeaux - Hendaye
- intercity services (Intercités) Hendaye - Bayonne - Pau - Tarbes - Toulouse
- local service (TER Nouvelle-Aquitaine) Bordeaux - Dax - Bayonne - Hendaye
- local service (TER Nouvelle-Aquitaine) Bayonne - Pau - Tarbes
- local service (TER Nouvelle-Aquitaine) Bayonne - Saint-Jean-Pied-de-Port

== Gallery ==
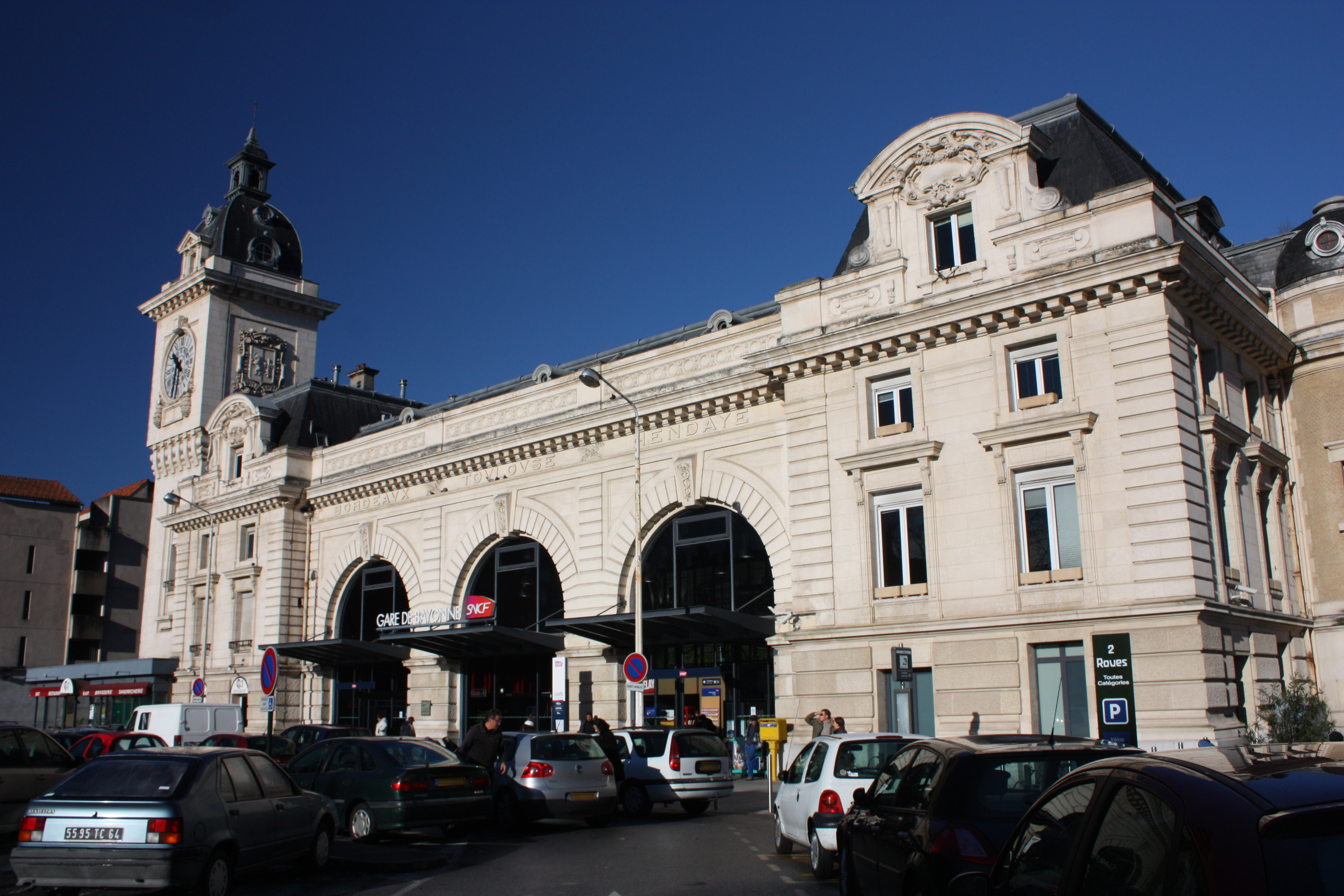
The station

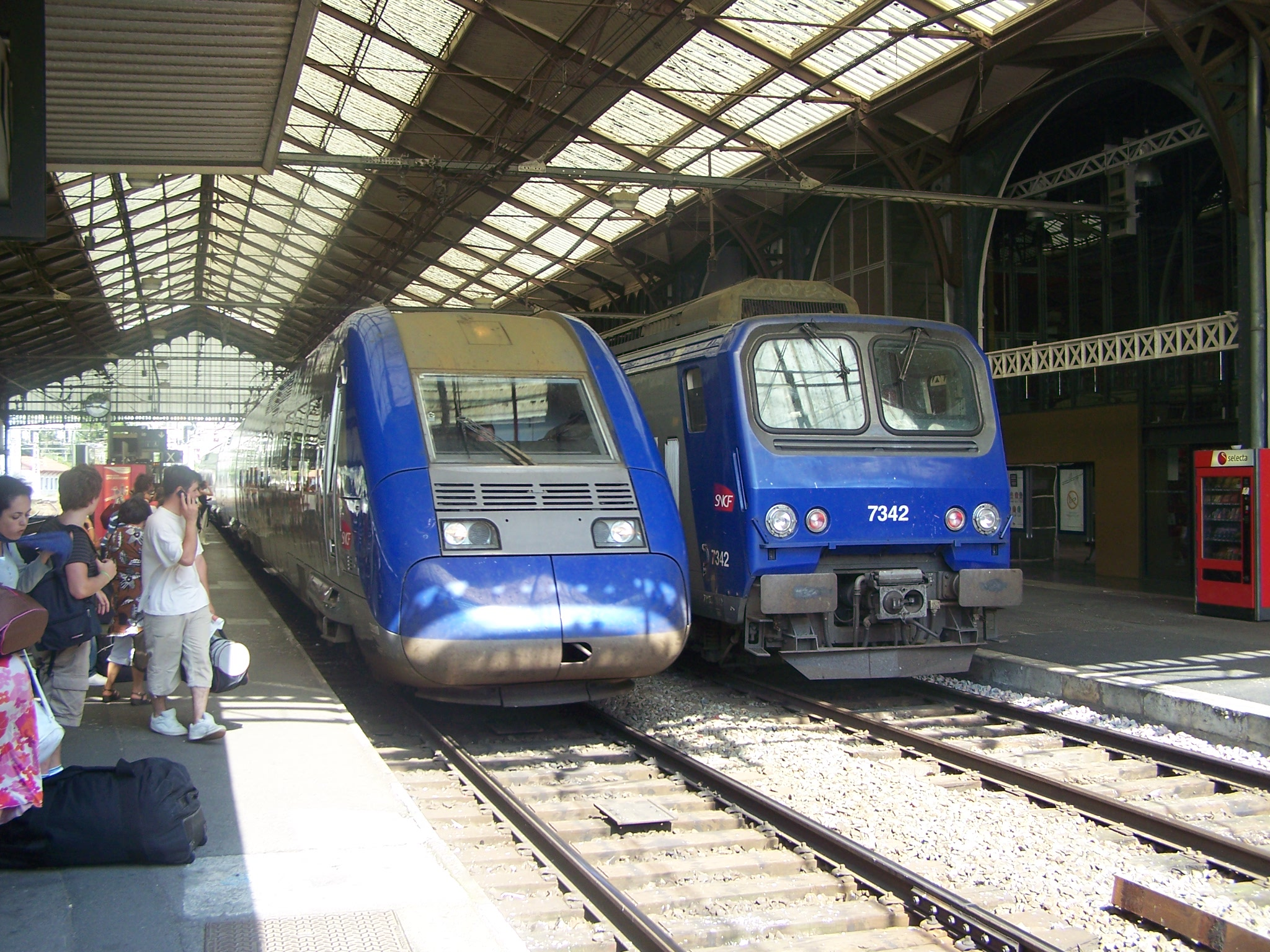
Two trains at Bayonne

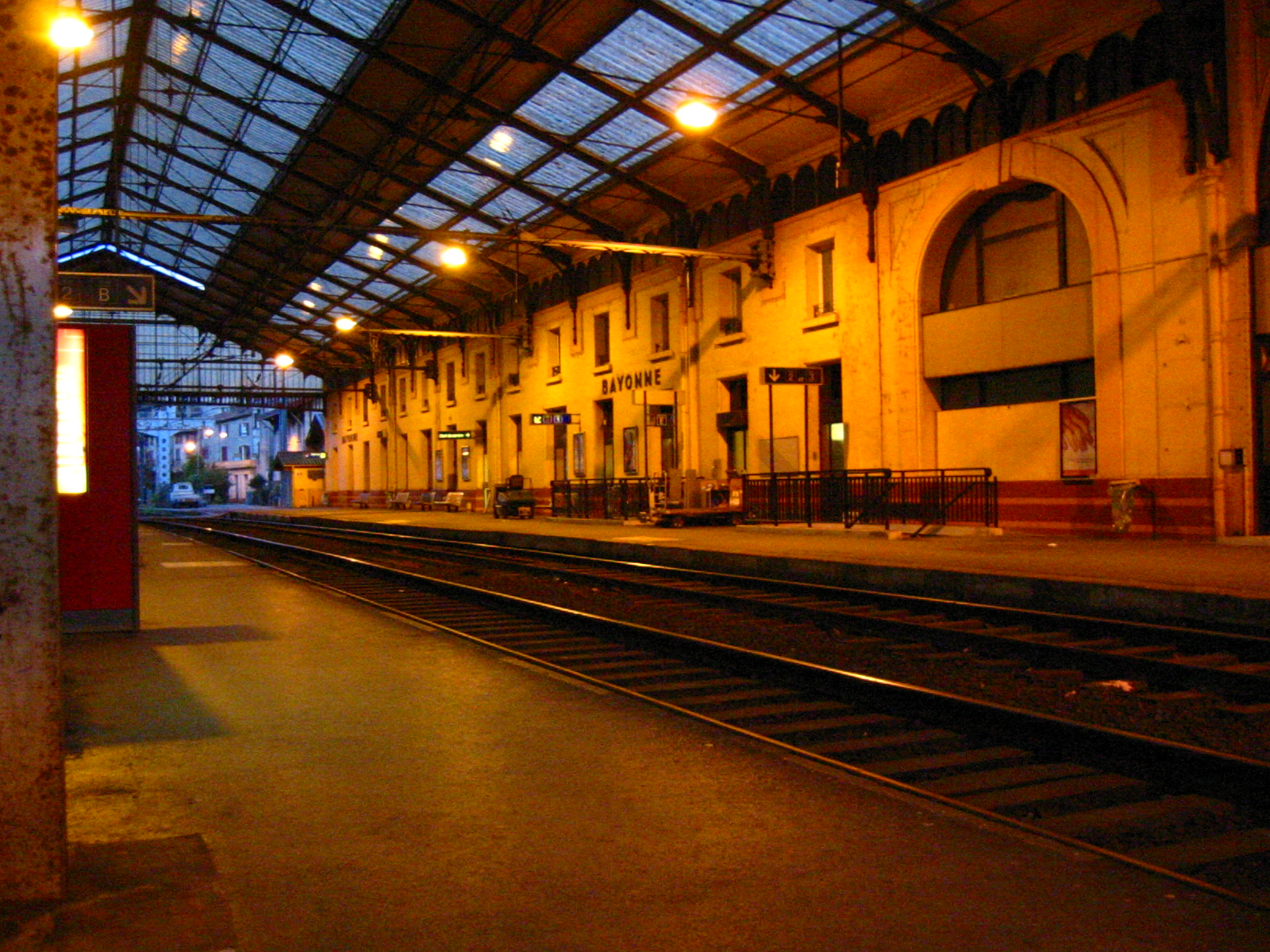
The station at night
