= Tarbes station =

Railway station in Tarbes, France

Tarbes

General information
- Location: 25 avenue Maréchal Joffre; 65000 Tarbes; France
- Coordinates: 43.2403°N 0.0694°E
- Elevation: 261 m (856 ft)
- Owner: SNCF
- Operator: SNCF
- Lines: Toulouse–Bayonne; Morcenx–Bagnères-de-Bigorre

Other information
- Station code: 87671008

History
- Opened: 24 September 1859
Services
Preceding station	SNCF	Following station
Lourdes towards Montparnasse	TGV inOui	Terminus
Lourdes towards Hendaye	Intercités	Lannemezan towards Toulouse
Les Aubrais towards Paris-Austerlitz	Intercités (night)	Lourdes towards Hendaye
Preceding station	TER Occitanie	Following station
Lourdes towards Pau	15	Tournay towards Toulouse
Preceding station	TER Nouvelle-Aquitaine	Following station
Ossun towards Bordeaux	52	Terminus
Ossun towards Bayonne	53	Terminus
Location

Tarbes station (French: Gare de Tarbes) is a railway station in Tarbes, Occitanie, France. The station is on the Toulouse–Bayonne railway line. The station is served by TGV (high speed trains), Intercités de Nuit (night trains), Intercités (long distance) and TER (local) services operated by the SNCF.

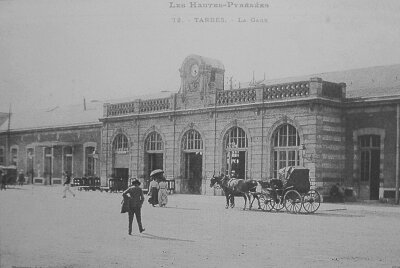
Tarbes station in around 1900

== Train services ==
The following services currently call at Tarbes:

- TGV services Paris - Saint-Pierre-des-Corps - Bordeaux - Dax - Pau - Tarbes
- intercity services (Intercités) Hendaye–Bayonne–Pau–Tarbes–Toulouse
- local service (TER Nouvelle-Aquitaine) Bordeaux-Dax–Pau–Tarbes
- local service (TER Nouvelle-Aquitaine) Bayonne–Pau–Tarbes
- local service (TER Occitanie) Toulouse–Saint-Gaudens–Tarbes–Pau

== See also ==
- List of SNCF stations in Occitanie
