= Toulouse–Bayonne railway =

Railway in France

Overview
- Status: Operational
- Owner: RFF
- Locale: France (Occitanie, Nouvelle-Aquitaine)
- Termini: Toulouse-Matabiau station; Bayonne station

Service
- System: SNCF
- Operator(s): SNCF

History
- Opened: 1861-1867

Technical
- Line length: 319 km (198 mi)
- Number of tracks: Double track Toulouse–Puyoô, single track Puyoô–Bayonne
- Track gauge: 1,435 mm (4 ft 8 1/2 in) standard gauge
- Electrification: 1.5 kV DC

The railway from Toulouse to Bayonne is an important French 319-kilometre long railway line, that connects the southern city Toulouse to the southwestern town Bayonne, running along the foothills of the Pyrenees. The railway was opened in several stages between 1861 and 1867.

== Route ==
The Toulouse–Bayonne railway leaves the Toulouse-Matabiau station in southern direction. It crosses the river Garonne south of Toulouse city centre, and follows the Garonne left bank upstream in southwestern direction. It crosses the Garonne twice near Saint-Martory, and turns west, still on the left Garonne bank. It crosses the Garonne again at Saint-Gaudens and at Montréjeau, where it leaves the Garonne valley.

Beyond Lannemezan the railway turns northwest towards Tarbes, where it turns southwest towards Lourdes. At Lourdes it turns west again and starts following the Gave de Pau downstream, on its right bank. At Saint-Pé-de-Bigorre the river and the railway turn northwest towards Pau and Puyoô. Beyond Puyoô the river and the railway take a western direction. The Gaves réunis is crossed at Hastingues, and the railway continues downstream along the left bank of the river Adour until it reaches Bayonne, its western terminus.

=== Main stations ===
The main stations on the Toulouse–Bayonne railway are:

- Toulouse-Matabiau station
- Tarbes station
- Pau station
- Bayonne station

== History ==
The railway was built by the Compagnie des chemins de fer du Midi. The first section that was opened in 1861 led from Toulouse to Portet-Saint-Simon, a section that is shared with the railway to Foix and further. The line was extended to Montréjeau in 1862. The section between Puyoô and Pau was opened in 1863. In 1864 Bayonne was connected with Puyoô, and in 1866 Tarbes was connected with Lourdes. Finally in 1867 the missing sections from Montréjeau to Tarbes and from Lourdes to Pau were opened.

== Services ==
The Toulouse–Bayonne railway is used by the following passenger services:

- TGV from Paris to Tarbes on the section between Puyoô and Tarbes
- Intercités from Bayonne to Toulouse
- TER Occitanie and TER Nouvelle-Aquitaine regional services on the whole line
