= Roqueserière–Buzet station =

Railway station in Buzet-sur-Tarn, France

Coordinates: 43°45′02″N 1°37′05″E

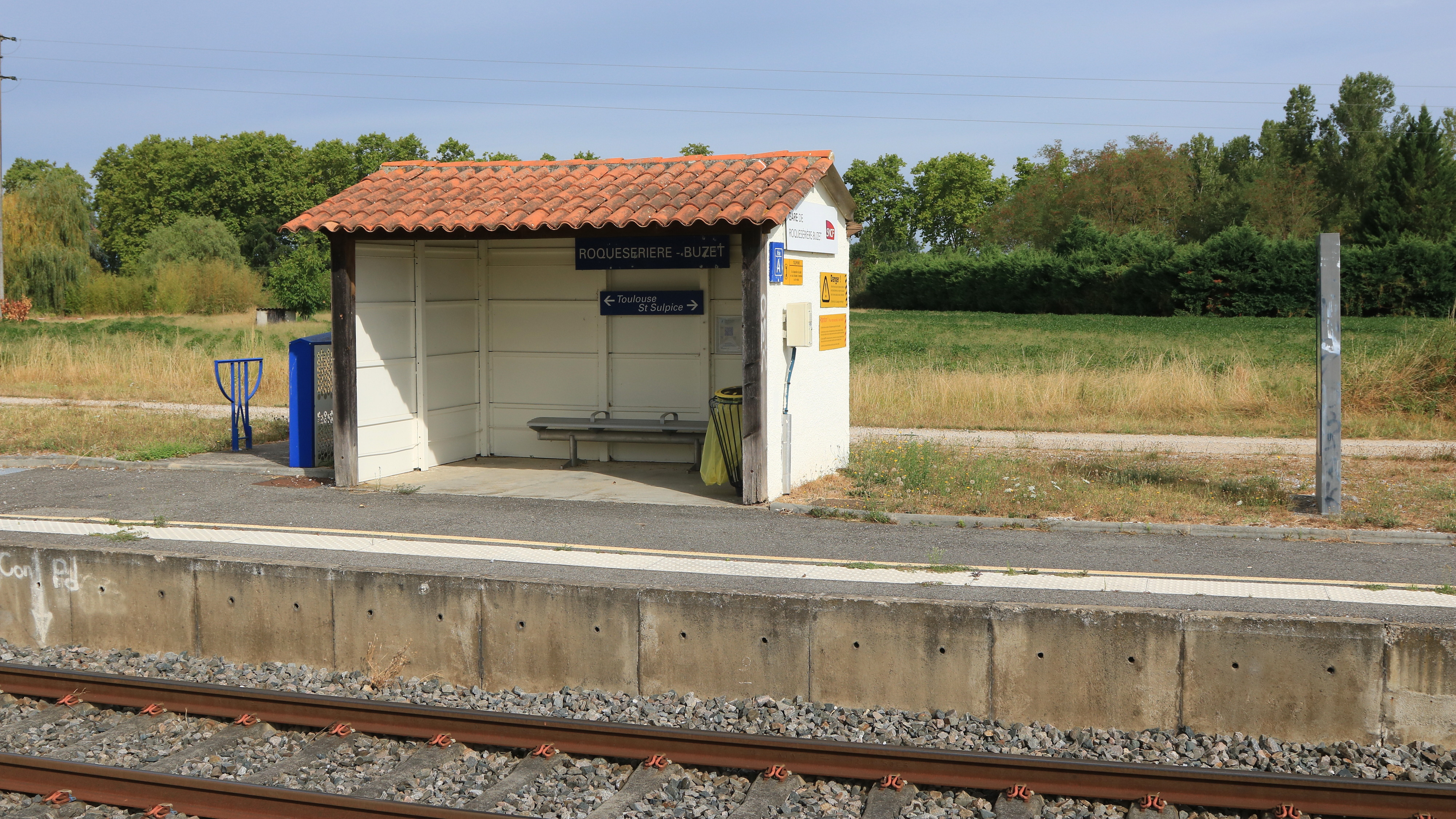
Photo of the station

Roqueserière-Buzet is a railway station in Occitanie, France. Located on the Brive–Toulouse (via Capdenac) railway line, the station is served by TER (local) services operated by SNCF.

== Train services ==
The following services currently call at Roqueserière-Buzet:

- local service (TER Occitanie) Toulouse–Albi–Rodez

Preceding station	TER Occitanie	Following station
Montastruc-la-Conseillère towards Toulouse	2	Saint-Sulpice towards Rodez
