= Gragnague station =

Railway station in France

Coordinates: 43°41′46″N 1°34′03″E

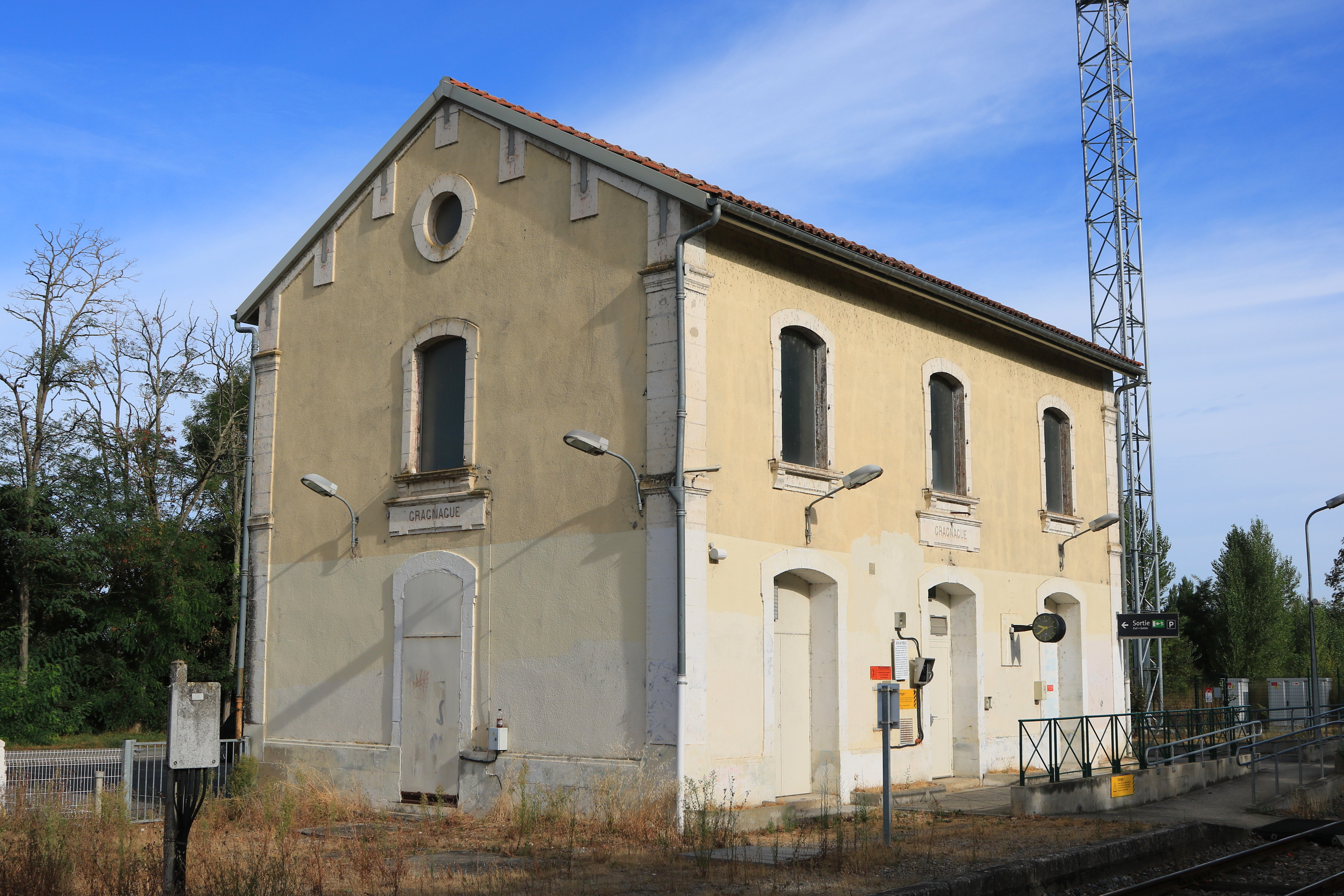

Gragnague is a railway station in Garidech and near Gragnague, Occitanie, France. Located on the Brive-Toulouse (via Capdenac) railway line, the station is served by TER (local) services operated by SNCF.

== Train services ==
The following services currently call at Gragnague:

- local service (TER Occitanie) Toulouse–Albi–Rodez

Preceding station	TER Occitanie	Following station
Montrabé towards Toulouse	2	Montastruc-la-Conseillère towards Rodez
