= Villenouvelle station =

Railway station in Villenouvelle, France

Villenouvelle

General information
- Location: Avenue de la Gare; 31290 Villenouvelle; Haute-Garonne, France
- Coordinates: 43.4332°N 1.66067°E
- Owner: SNCF
- Operator: SNCF
- Line: Bordeaux–Sète railway
- Platforms: 2
- Tracks: 2 (+ service tracks)

Other information
- Station code: 87618215

History
- Opened: 22 April 1857

Passengers
- 2019: 17,338

Services
Preceding station	TER Occitanie	Following station
Baziège towards Toulouse	10	Villefranche-de-Lauragais towards Narbonne
Location

Villenouvelle station (French: Gare de Villenouvelle) is a railway station in Villenouvelle, Occitanie, southern France. Within TER Occitanie, it is part of line 10 (Toulouse–Narbonne).
