= Montastruc-la-Conseillère station =

Railway station in Montastruc-la-Conseillère, France

Coordinates: 43°42′57″N 1°35′53″E

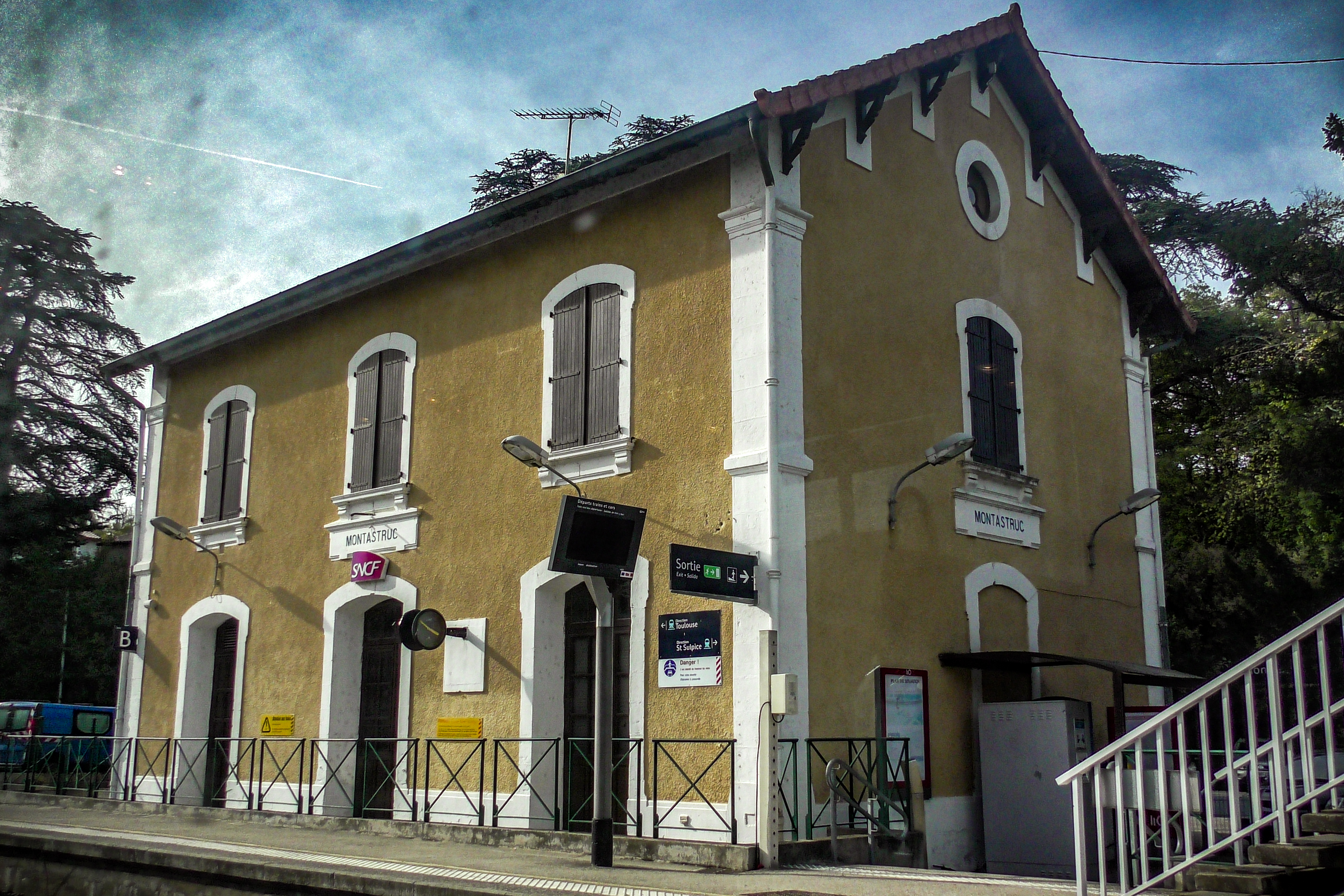

Montastruc-la-Conseillère is a railway station in Montastruc-la-Conseillère, Occitanie, which is the southernmost administrative region of France. It is on the Brive-Toulouse (via Capdenac) railway line. The station is served by TER (local) services operated by SNCF.

== Train services ==
The following services currently call at Montastruc-la-Conseillère:

- local service (TER Occitanie) Toulouse–Albi–Rodez
- local service (TER Occitanie) Toulouse–Castres–Mazamet

Preceding station	TER Occitanie	Following station
Gragnague towards Toulouse	2	Roqueserière-Buzet towards Rodez
Montrabé towards Toulouse	9	Saint-Sulpice-sur-Tarn towards Mazamet
