= Garidech =

- Commune
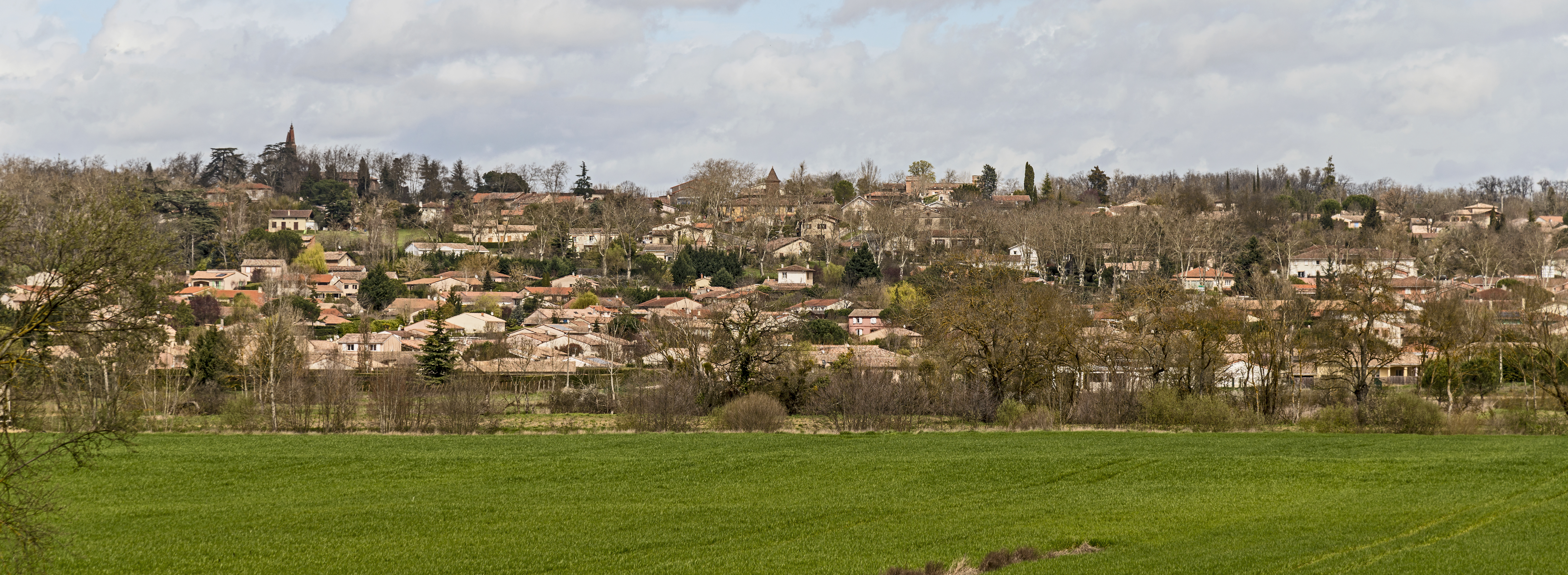
- A general view of Garidech

- Coat of arms
- Location of Garidech
- Location within France Location within Occitanie
- Coordinates: 43°42′32″N 1°33′42″E
- Country: France
- Region: Occitania
- Department: Haute-Garonne
- Arrondissement: Toulouse
- Canton: Pechbonnieu
- Intercommunality: Coteaux du Girou

Government
  - Mayor (2020–2026): Christian Ciercóles
- Area^{1}: 7.11 km^{2} (2.75 sq mi)
- Elevation: 190 m (620 ft)
- Highest elevation: 214 m (702 ft)
- Lowest elevation: 132 m (433 ft)
- Population (2023): 1,893
  - Density: 266/km^{2} (690/sq mi)
- Time zone: UTC+01:00 (CET)
  - Summer (DST): UTC+02:00 (CEST)
- INSEE/Postal code: 31212 /31380
- ^{1} French Land Register data, which excludes lakes, ponds, glaciers > 1 km^{2} (0.386 sq mi or 247 acres) and river estuaries.

Garidech (French pronunciation: [ɡaʁidɛʃ]; Occitan: Garidèit) is a commune in the Haute-Garonne department in southwestern France.

== Population ==
Historical population
Year	Pop.	±% p.a.
1968	318	—
1975	380	+2.58%
1982	520	+4.58%
1990	698	+3.75%
1999	954	+3.53%
2007	1,548	+6.24%
2012	1,650	+1.28%
2017	1,768	+1.39%
2023	1,893	+1.15%
Source: INSEE

The inhabitants of the commune are called Garidéchois in French.

== Transport ==
- Gare de Gragnague

== Monuments ==
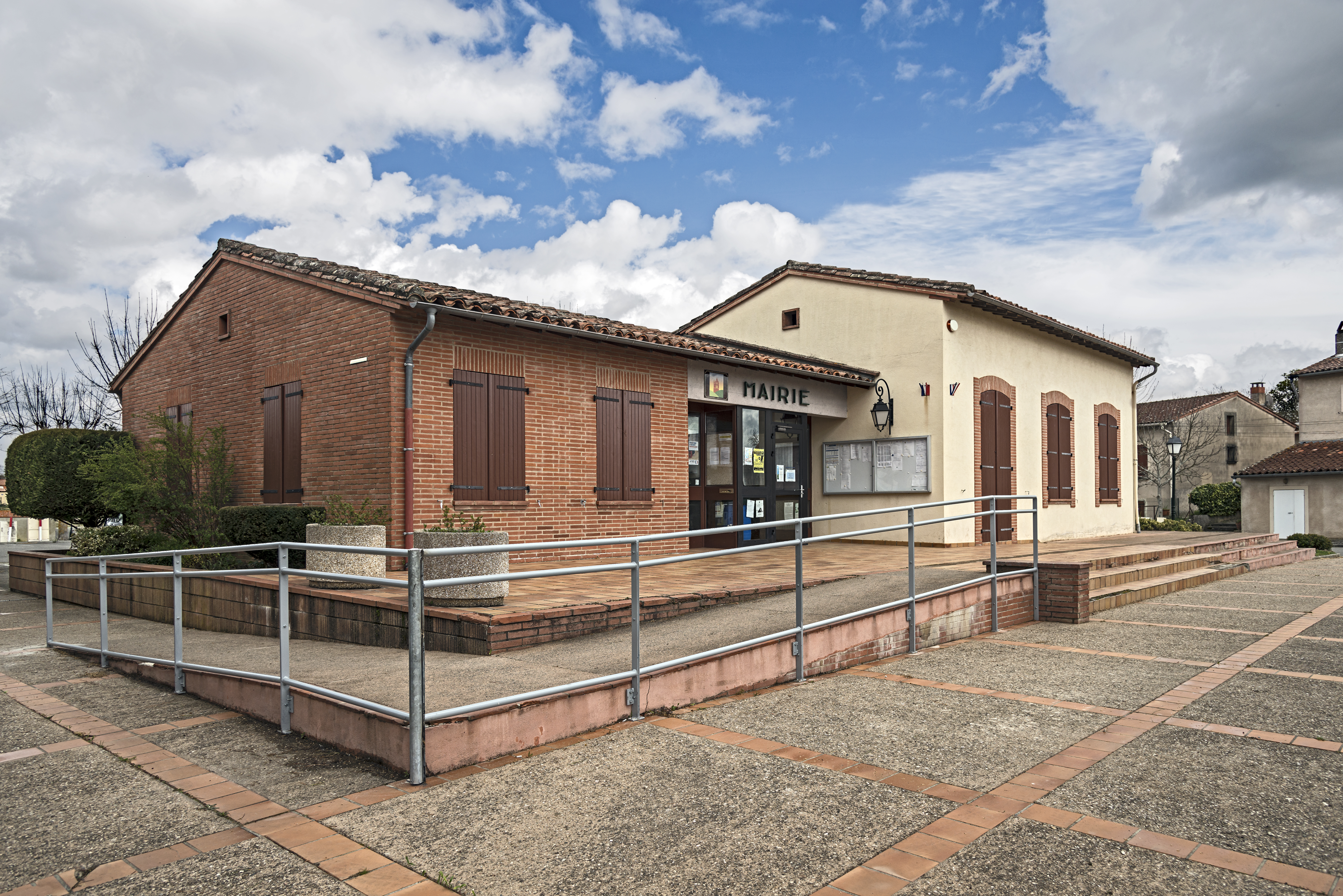
Town hall

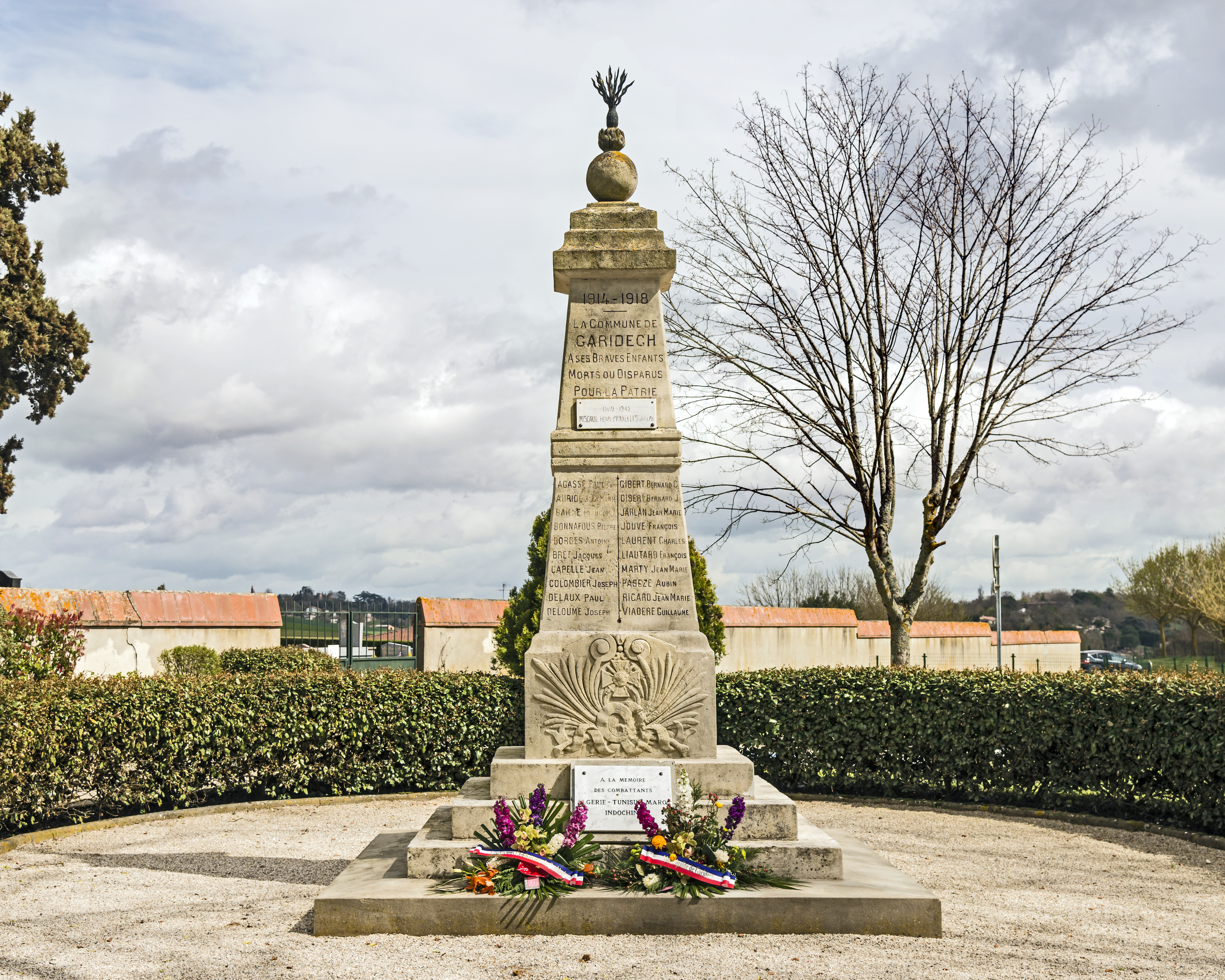
War memorial

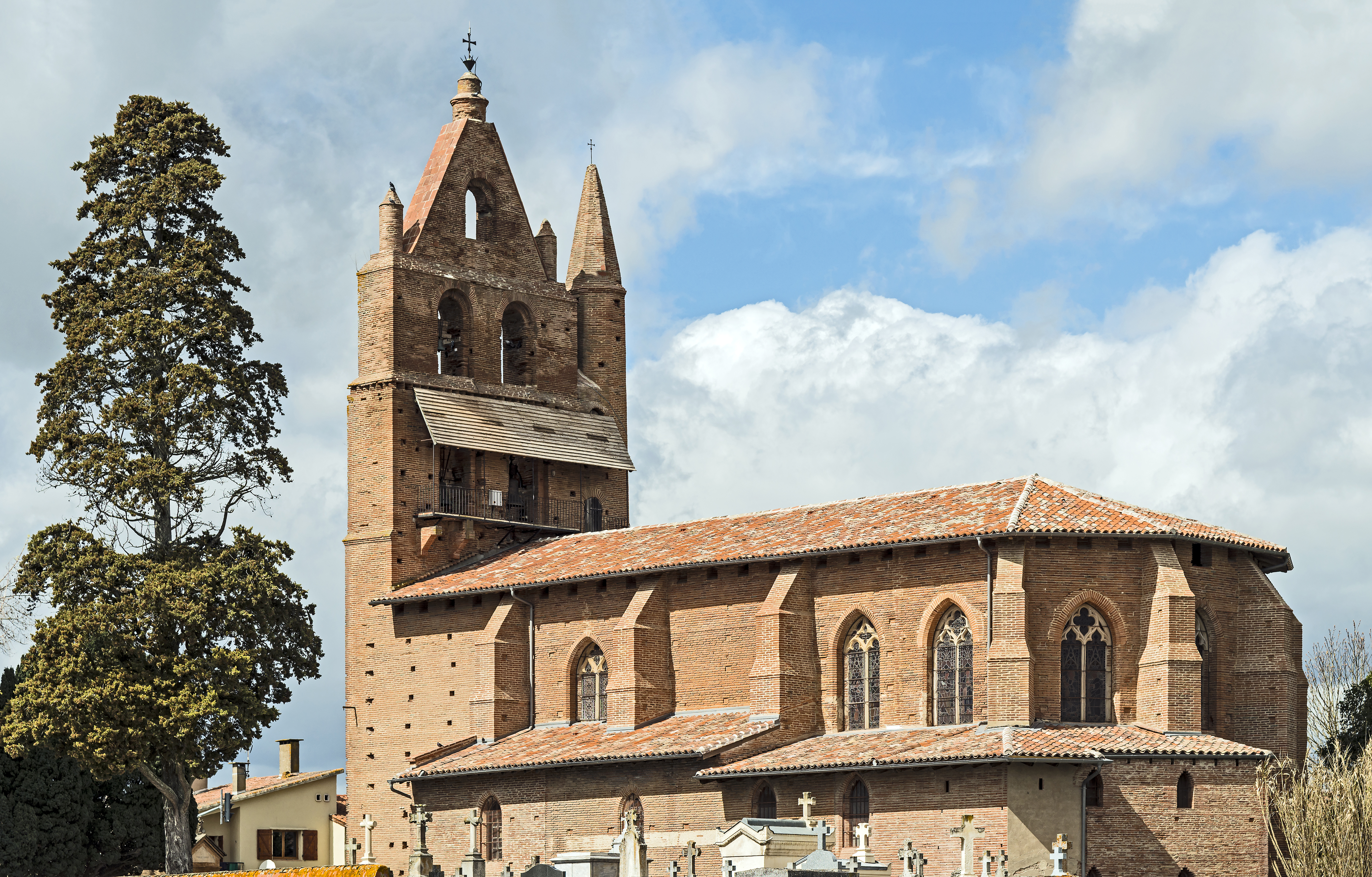
Church Saint-Jean-Baptiste

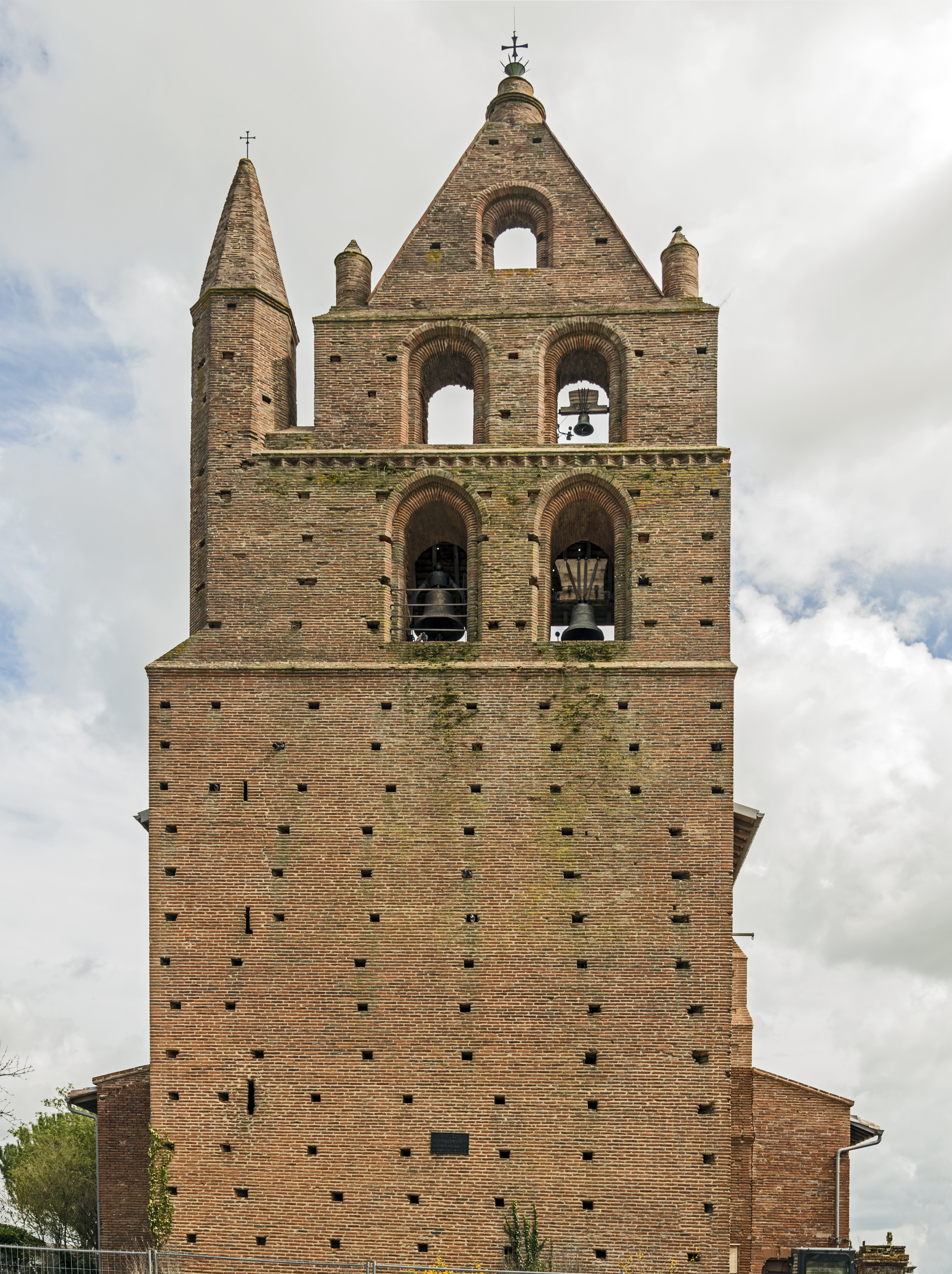
Bel gable

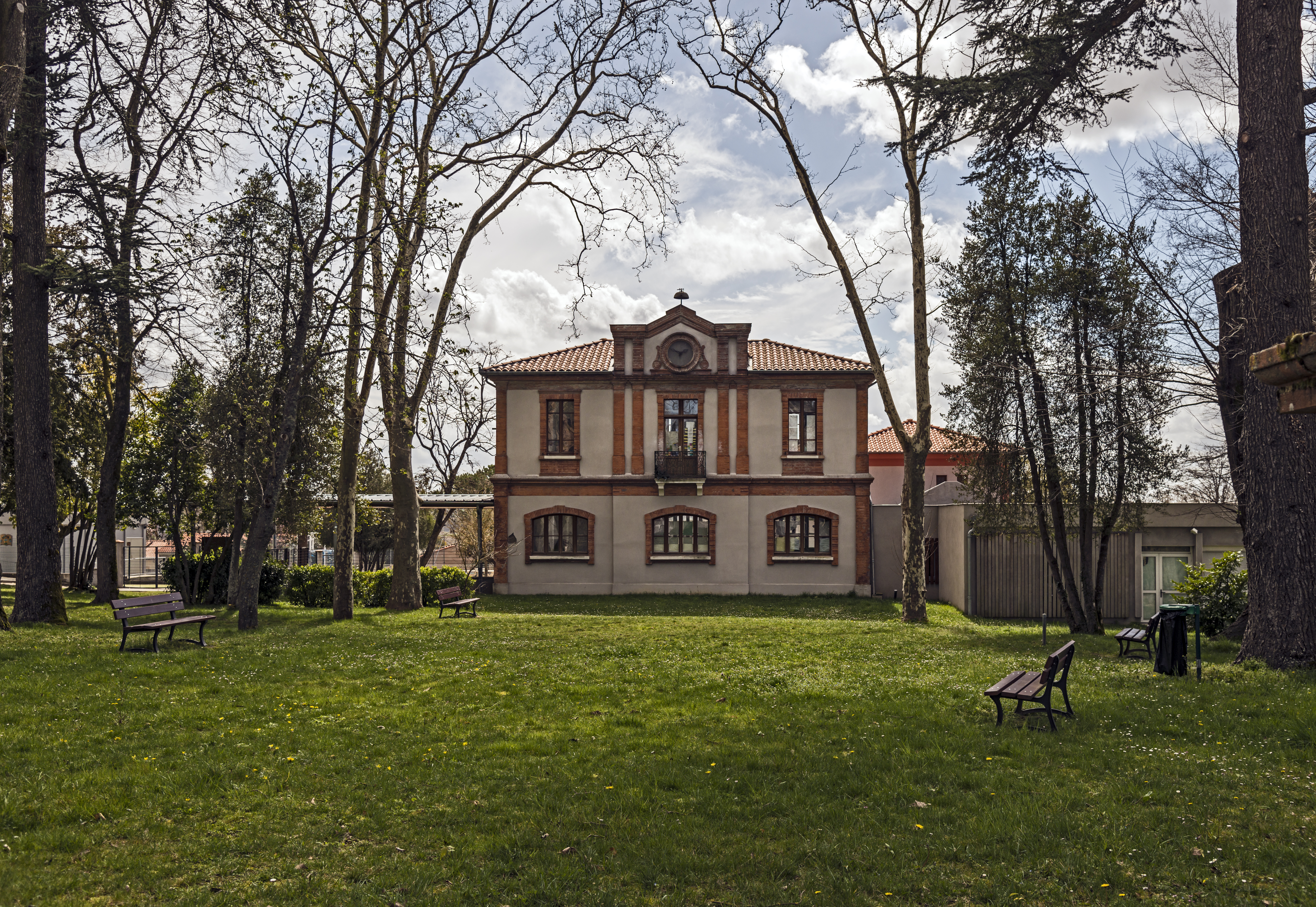
Primary school

== See also ==
- Communes of the Haute-Garonne department
