= Saint-Sulpice station (Tarn) =

Railway station in Saint-Sulpice, France

Coordinates: 43°46′30″N 1°40′50″E

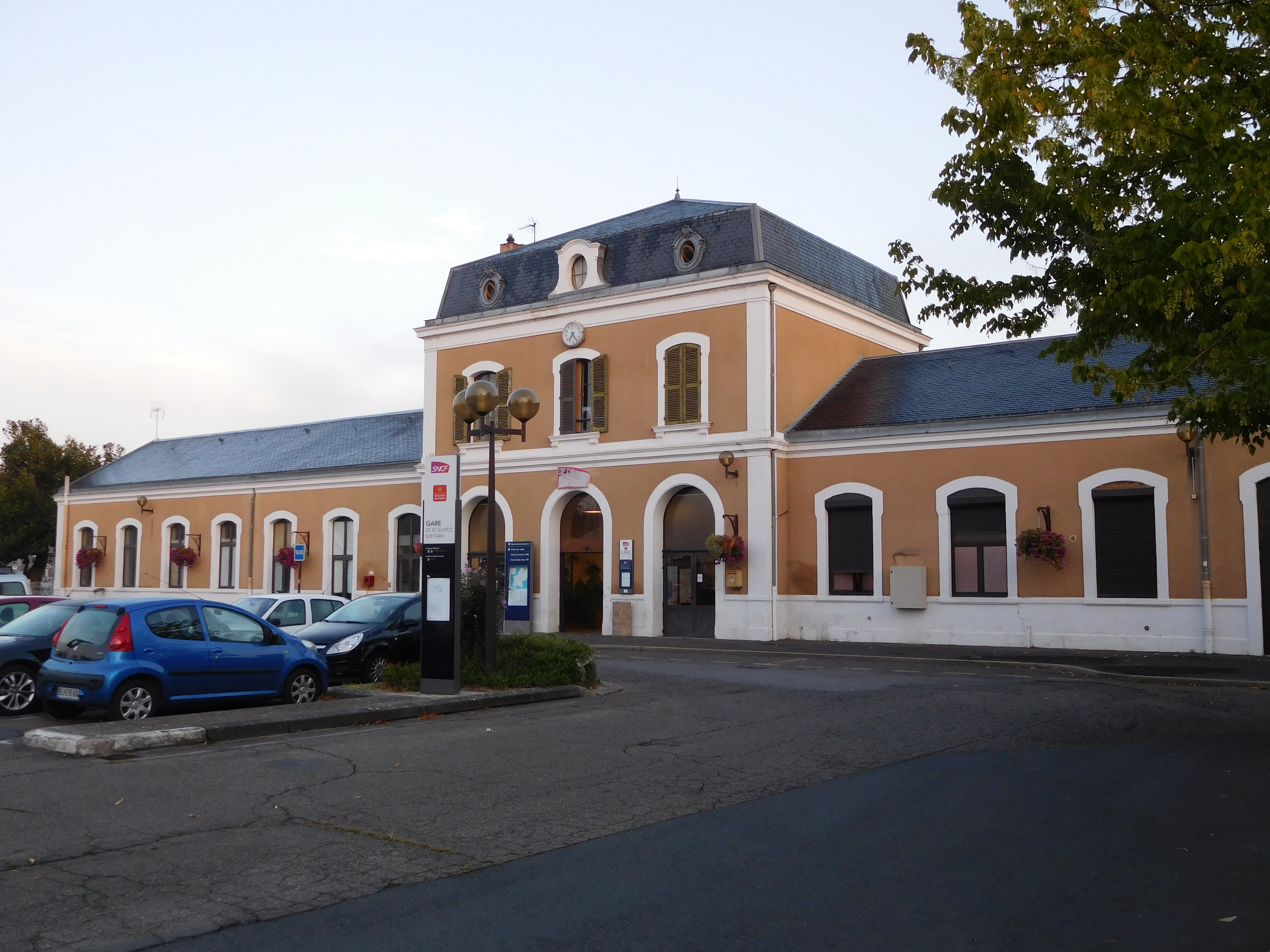
Facade of Saint-Sulpice station

Saint-Sulpice is a railway station in Saint-Sulpice-la-Pointe, Occitanie, in southern France. It is on the Brive–Toulouse (via Capdenac) and Saint-Sulpice–Mazamet railway lines. The station is served by TER (local) services operated by SNCF.

== Train services ==
The following services currently call at Saint-Sulpice:

- local service (TER Occitanie) Toulouse–Albi–Rodez
- local service (TER Occitanie) Toulouse–Figeac–Aurillac
- local service (TER Occitanie) Toulouse–Castres–Mazamet

Preceding station	TER Occitanie	Following station
Roqueserière-Buzet towards Toulouse	2	Rabastens-Couffouleux towards Rodez
Toulouse-Matabiau towards Toulouse	3	Lisle-sur-Tarn towards Aurillac
Montastruc-la-Conseillère towards Toulouse	9	Les Cauquillous towards Mazamet
