= Gragnague =

- Commune
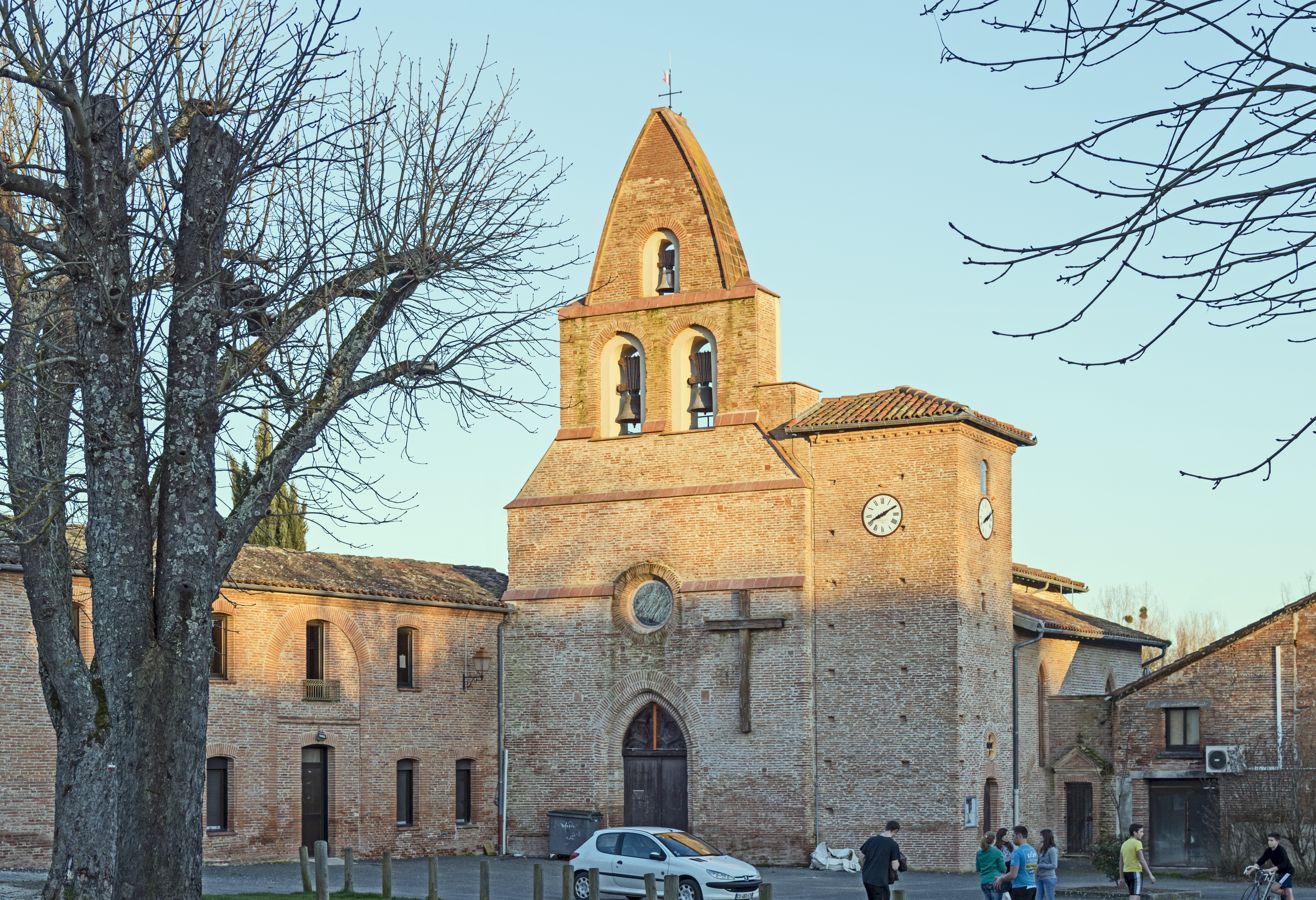
- The church in Gragnague

- Coat of arms
- Location of Gragnague
- Location within France Location within Occitanie
- Coordinates: 43°41′39″N 1°35′02″E
- Country: France
- Region: Occitania
- Department: Haute-Garonne
- Arrondissement: Toulouse
- Canton: Pechbonnieu
- Intercommunality: Coteaux du Girou

Government
  - Mayor (2020–2026): Daniel Calas
- Area^{1}: 13.04 km^{2} (5.03 sq mi)
- Elevation: 144 m (472 ft)
- Highest elevation: 233 m (764 ft)
- Lowest elevation: 136 m (446 ft)
- Population (2023): 2,553
  - Density: 195.8/km^{2} (507.1/sq mi)
- Time zone: UTC+01:00 (CET)
  - Summer (DST): UTC+02:00 (CEST)
- INSEE/Postal code: 31228 /31380
- ^{1} French Land Register data, which excludes lakes, ponds, glaciers > 1 km^{2} (0.386 sq mi or 247 acres) and river estuaries.

Gragnague (French pronunciation: [ɡʁaɲaɡ]; Occitan: Granhaga) is a commune in the Haute-Garonne department in southwestern France.

== Population ==
The inhabitants of the commune are known as Gragnaguais in French.

Historical population
Year	Pop.	±% p.a.
1968	422	—
1975	596	+5.06%
1982	723	+2.80%
1990	889	+2.62%
1999	1,437	+5.48%
2007	1,571	+1.12%
2012	1,759	+2.29%
2017	1,817	+0.65%
2023	2,553	+5.83%
Source: INSEE

== Transport ==
Gragnague station has rail connections to Toulouse, Albi and Rodez.

== Monument ==
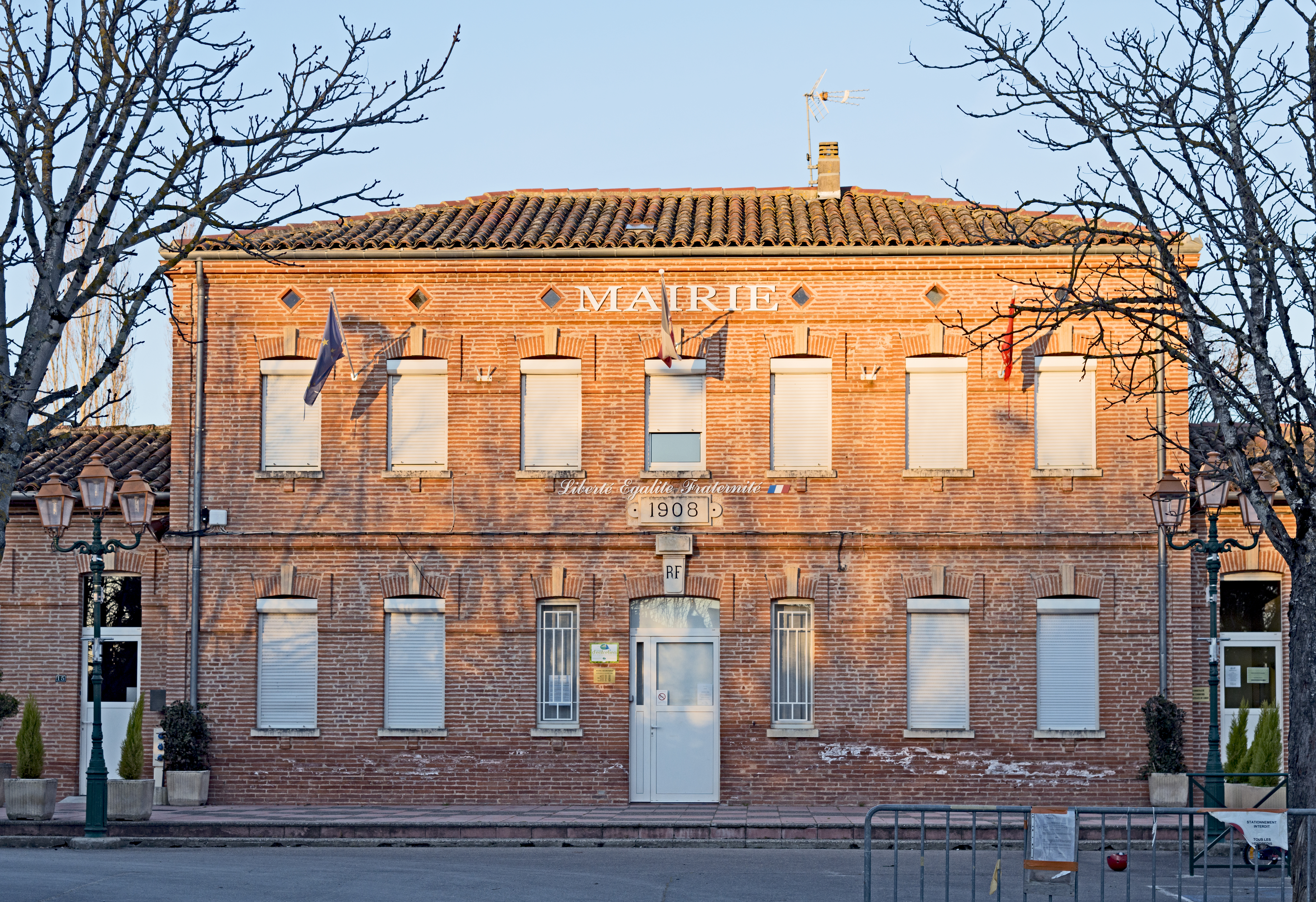
Town hall

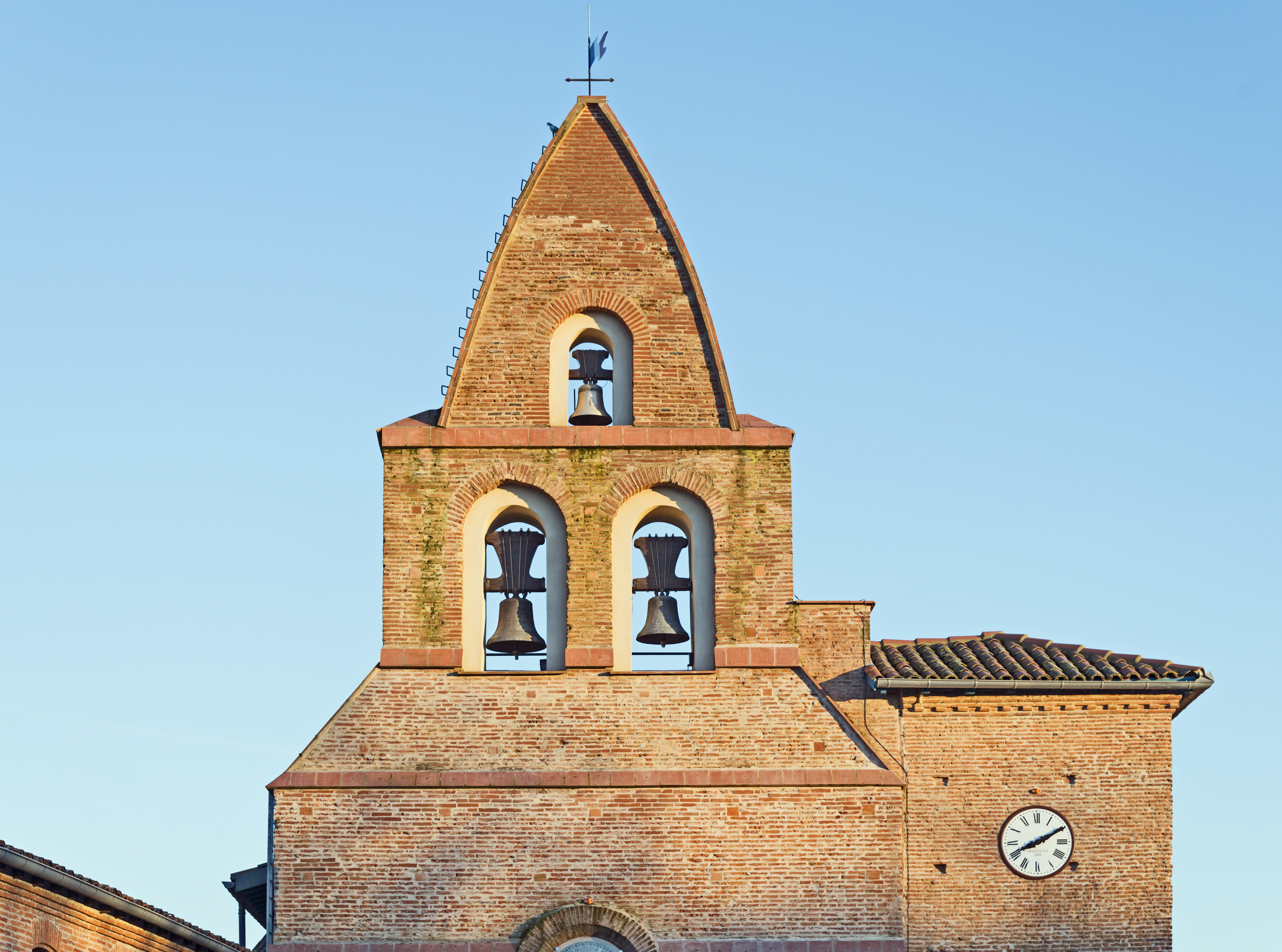
Bell gable

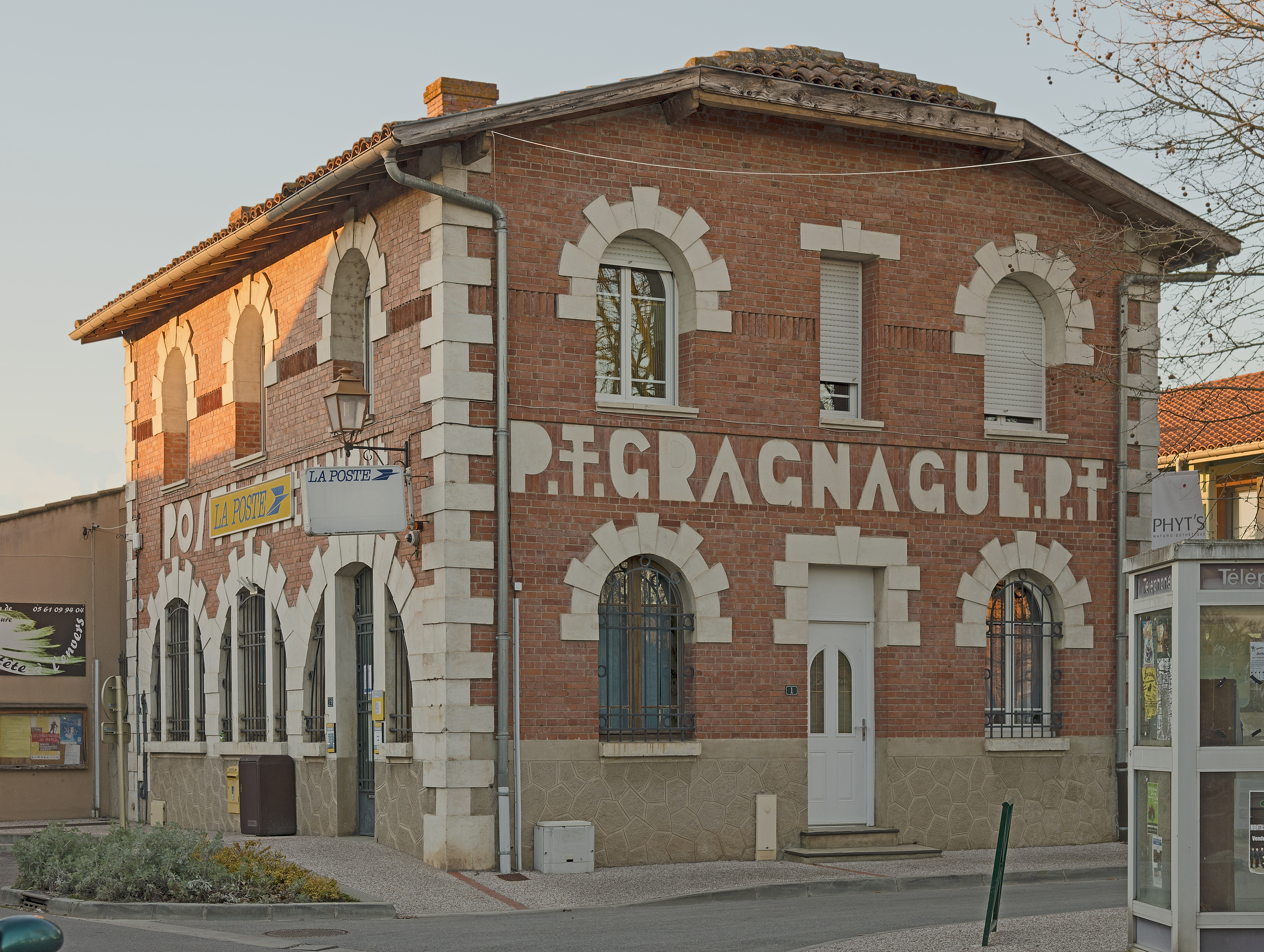
Post office

== See also ==
- Communes of the Haute-Garonne department
