= Montrabé station =

Railway station in Montrabé, France

Coordinates: 43°38′44″N 1°31′27″E

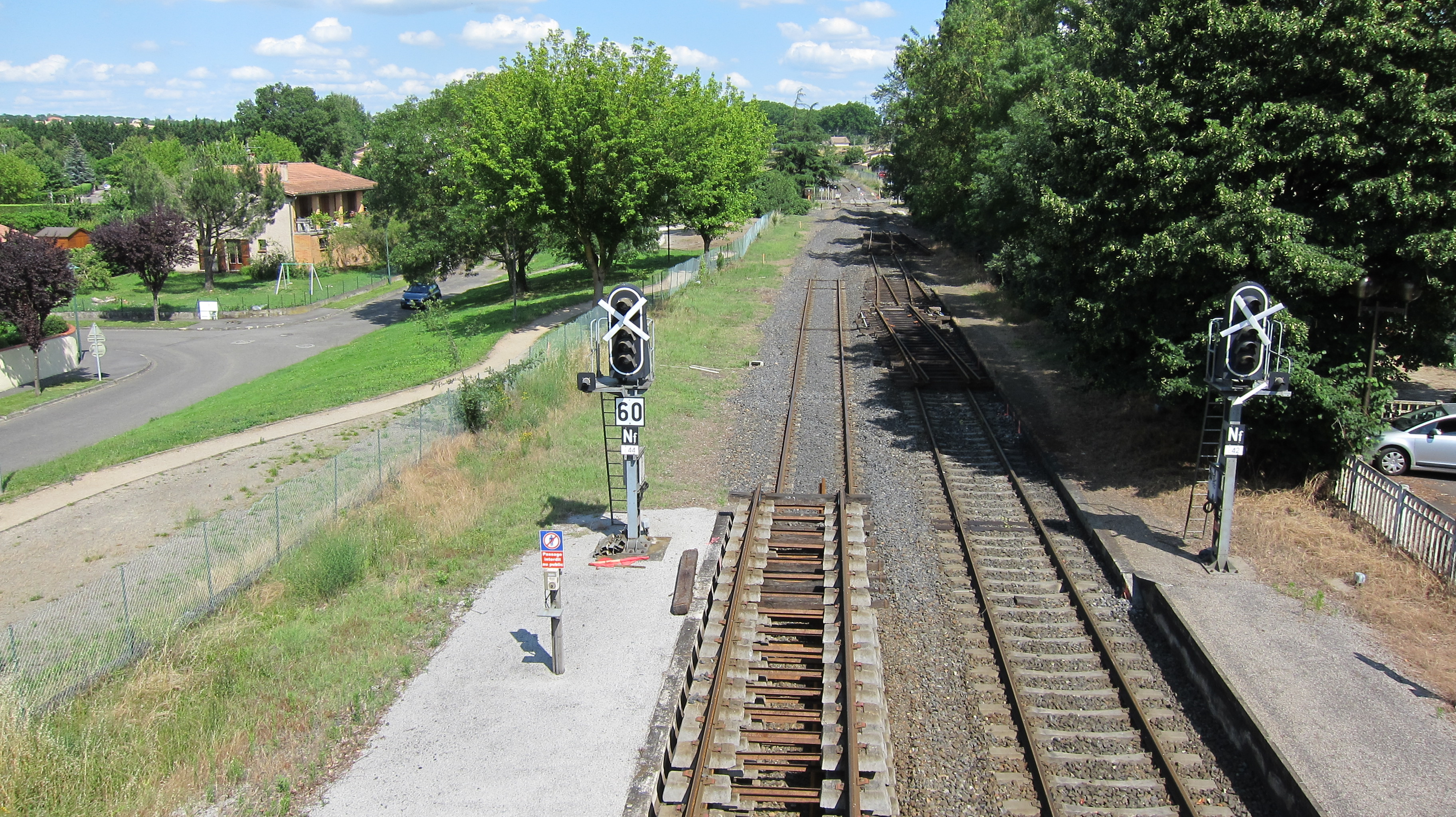
Montrabé railway

Montrabé is a railway station in Montrabé, Occitanie, which is the southernmost administrative region of France. The station is situated on the Brive–Toulouse (via Capdenac) railway line. It is served by TER (local) services operated by SNCF.

== Train services ==
The following services currently call at Montrabé:

- local service (TER Occitanie) Toulouse–Albi–Rodez
- local service (TER Occitanie) Toulouse–Castres–Mazamet

Preceding station	TER Occitanie	Following station
Toulouse-Matabiau towards Toulouse	2	Gragnague towards Rodez
Toulouse-Matabiau towards Toulouse	9	Montastruc-la-Conseillère towards Mazamet
