= Villenouvelle =

- Commune
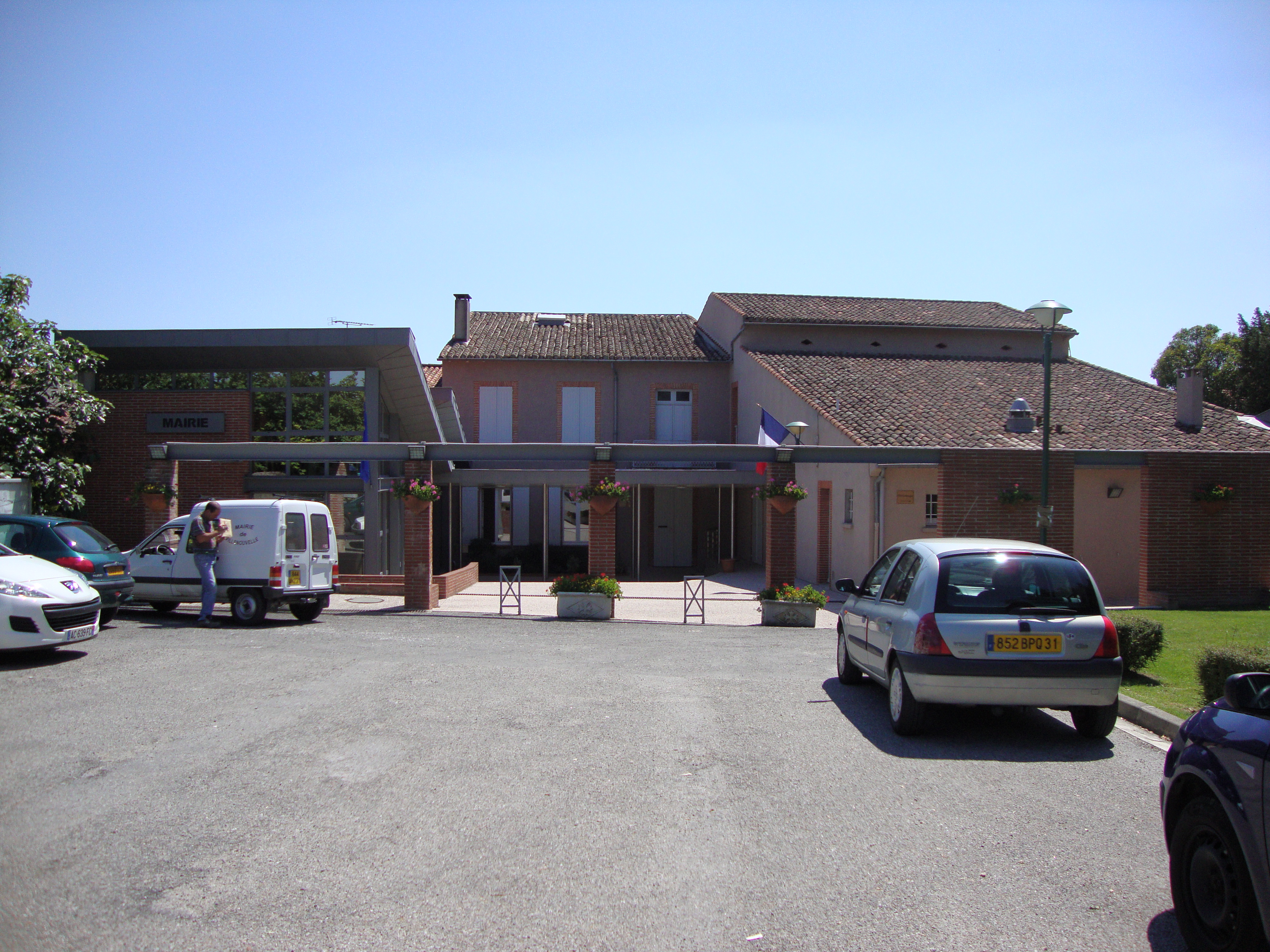
- Town hall

- Coat of arms
- Location of Villenouvelle
- Location within France Location within Occitanie
- Coordinates: 43°26′11″N 1°39′50″E
- Country: France
- Region: Occitania
- Department: Haute-Garonne
- Arrondissement: Toulouse
- Canton: Revel

Government
  - Mayor (2020–2026): Nicolas Fédou
- Area^{1}: 7.95 km^{2} (3.07 sq mi)
- Elevation: 168 m (551 ft)
- Highest elevation: 241 m (791 ft)
- Lowest elevation: 158 m (518 ft)
- Population (2023): 1,487
  - Density: 187/km^{2} (484/sq mi)
- Time zone: UTC+01:00 (CET)
  - Summer (DST): UTC+02:00 (CEST)
- INSEE/Postal code: 31589 /31290
- ^{1} French Land Register data, which excludes lakes, ponds, glaciers > 1 km^{2} (0.386 sq mi or 247 acres) and river estuaries.

Villenouvelle (French pronunciation: [vilnuvɛl]; Occitan: Vilanovèla) is a commune in the Haute-Garonne department in southwestern France. Villenouvelle station has rail connections to Toulouse, Carcassonne and Narbonne.

== Population ==
Historical population
Year	Pop.	±% p.a.
1968	619	—
1975	645	+0.59%
1982	762	+2.41%
1990	905	+2.17%
1999	940	+0.42%
2007	1,280	+3.93%
2012	1,373	+1.41%
2017	1,391	+0.26%
2023	1,487	+1.12%
Source: INSEE

== See also ==
- Communes of the Haute-Garonne department
