= Montastruc-la-Conseillère =

- Commune
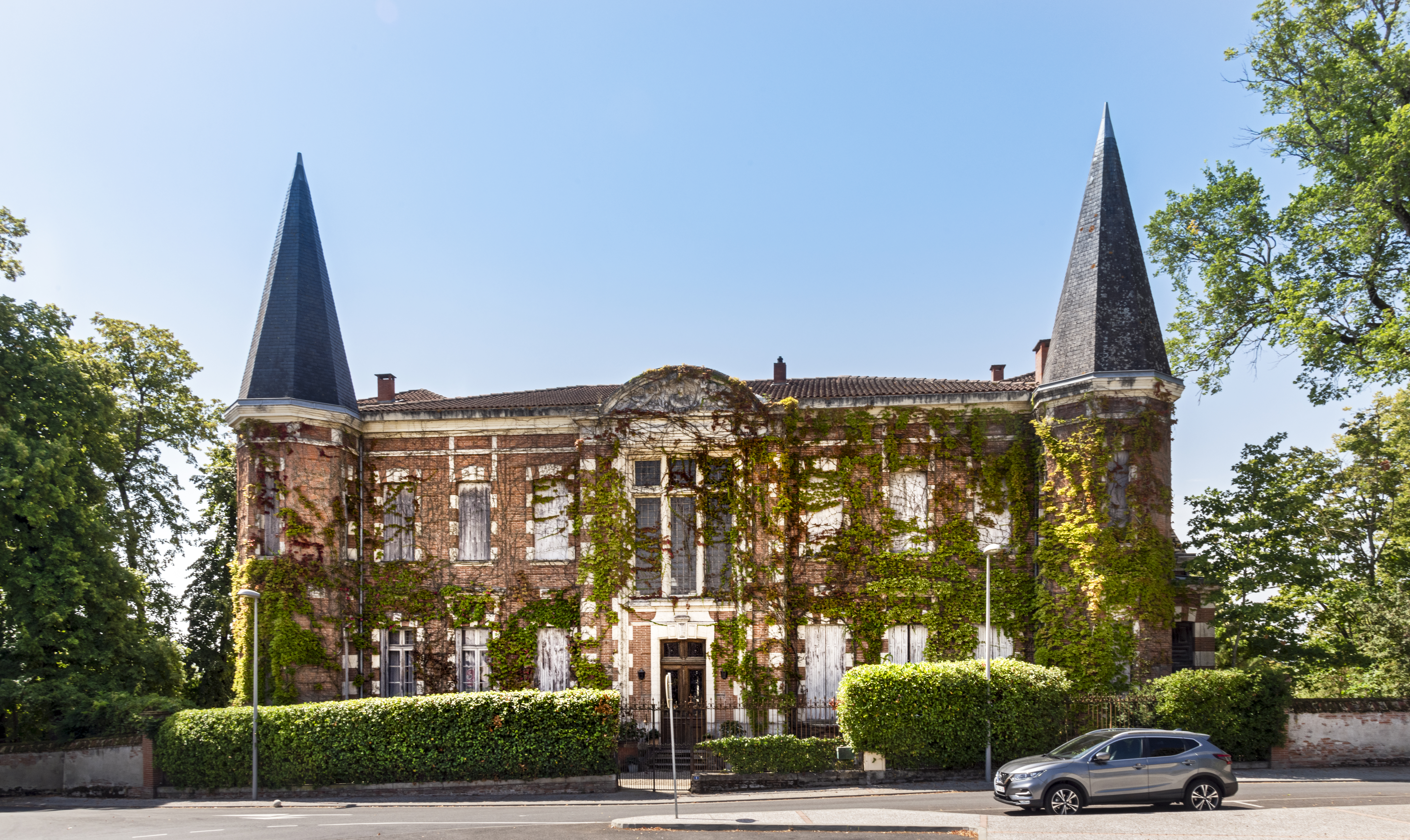

- Coat of arms
- Location of Montastruc-la-Conseillère
- Location within France Location within Occitanie
- Coordinates: 43°43′06″N 1°35′28″E
- Country: France
- Region: Occitania
- Department: Haute-Garonne
- Arrondissement: Toulouse
- Canton: Pechbonnieu
- Intercommunality: Coteaux du Girou

Government
  - Mayor (2020–2026): Jean-Baptiste Capel
- Area^{1}: 15.49 km^{2} (5.98 sq mi)
- Elevation: 230 m (750 ft)
- Highest elevation: 242 m (794 ft)
- Lowest elevation: 143 m (469 ft)
- Population (2023): 3,708
  - Density: 239.4/km^{2} (620.0/sq mi)
- Time zone: UTC+01:00 (CET)
  - Summer (DST): UTC+02:00 (CEST)
- INSEE/Postal code: 31358 /31380
- ^{1} French Land Register data, which excludes lakes, ponds, glaciers > 1 km^{2} (0.386 sq mi or 247 acres) and river estuaries.

Montastruc-la-Conseillère (French pronunciation: [mɔ̃tastʁyk la kɔ̃sɛjɛʁ]; Occitan: Montastruc e la Conselhièra) is a commune in the Haute-Garonne department of southwestern France.

== Population ==
The inhabitants of the commune are known as Montastrucoises and Montastrucois in French.

Historical population
Year	Pop.	±% p.a.
1968	1,357	—
1975	1,635	+2.70%
1982	1,842	+1.72%
1990	2,101	+1.66%
1999	2,495	+1.93%
2007	3,049	+2.54%
2012	3,204	+1.00%
2017	3,430	+1.37%
2023	3,708	+1.31%
Source: INSEE

== Twin towns ==
Montastruc-la-Conseillère is twinned with:

- Maizières-lès-Metz, France
- Sant Pere Pescador, Spain

== Transport ==
Montastruc-la-Conseillère station has rail connections to Toulouse, Castres, Albi and Rodez.

== See also ==
- Communes of the Haute-Garonne department
