= Saint-Sulpice-la-Pointe =

- Commune
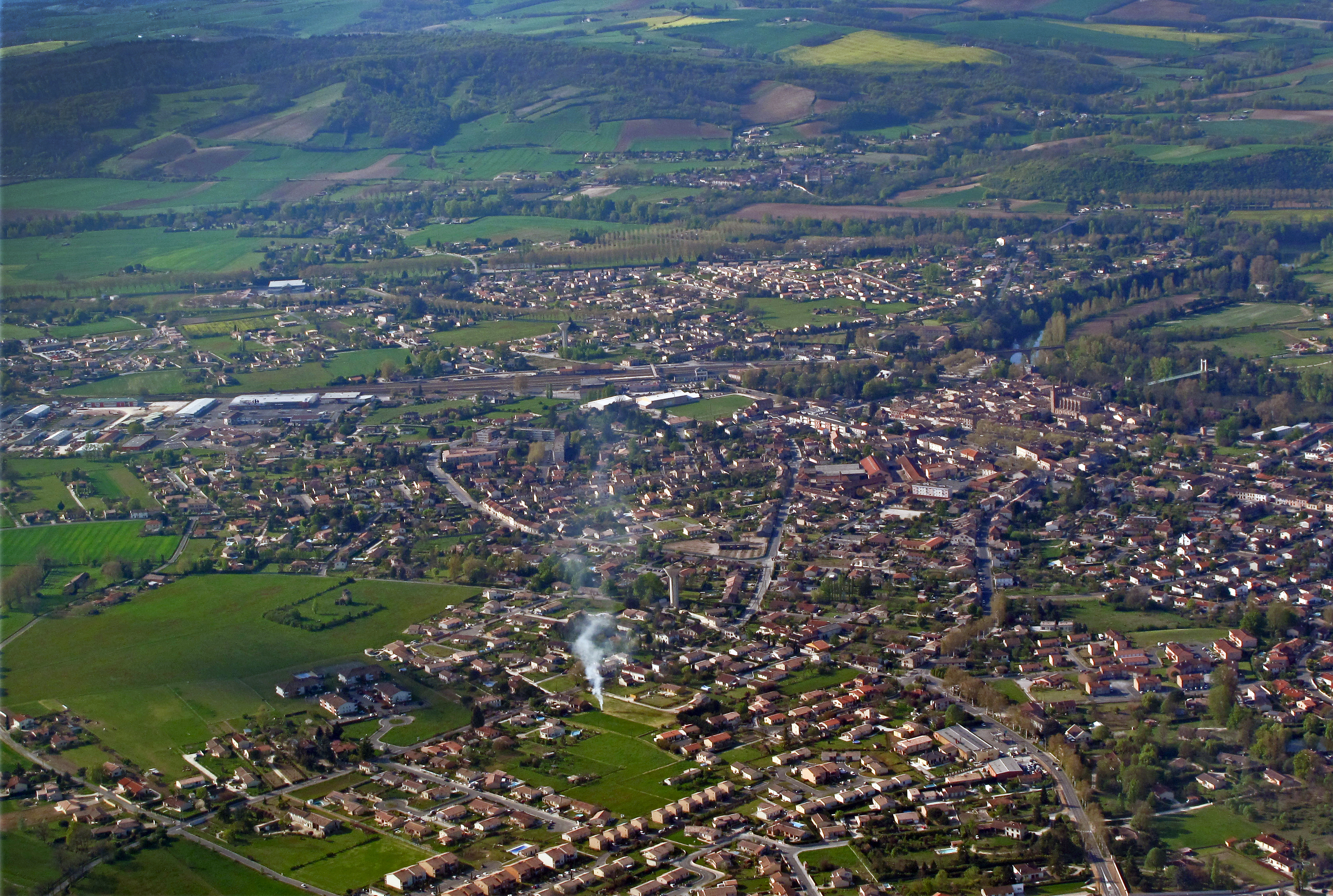
- An aerial view of Saint-Sulpice

- Coat of arms
- Location of Saint-Sulpice-la-Pointe
- Location within France Location within Occitanie
- Coordinates: 43°46′30″N 1°41′14″E
- Country: France
- Region: Occitania
- Department: Tarn
- Arrondissement: Castres
- Canton: Les Portes du Tarn
- Intercommunality: Tarn-Agout

Government
  - Mayor (2020–2026): Raphaël Bernardin
- Area^{1}: 23.99 km^{2} (9.26 sq mi)
- Elevation: 112 m (367 ft)
- Highest elevation: 195 m (640 ft)
- Lowest elevation: 95 m (312 ft)
- Population (2023): 9,719
  - Density: 405.1/km^{2} (1,049/sq mi)
- Time zone: UTC+01:00 (CET)
  - Summer (DST): UTC+02:00 (CEST)
- INSEE/Postal code: 81271 /81370
- ^{1} French Land Register data, which excludes lakes, ponds, glaciers > 1 km^{2} (0.386 sq mi or 247 acres) and river estuaries.

Saint-Sulpice-la-Pointe (French pronunciation: [sɛ̃ sylpis la pwɛ̃t], before 2013: Saint-Sulpice; Languedocien: Sant Somplesi) is a commune in the Tarn department in southern France. During World War 2 a concentration camp was built in this town.

== Population ==
Historical population
Year	Pop.	±% p.a.
1968	2,841	—
1975	3,342	+2.35%
1982	3,877	+2.14%
1990	4,354	+1.46%
1999	4,801	+1.09%
2007	7,612	+5.93%
2012	8,327	+1.81%
2017	9,117	+1.83%
2023	9,719	+1.07%
Source: INSEE

== Transport ==
Saint-Sulpice station has rail connections to Toulouse, Rodez, Aurillac and Castres.

== Remarkable places and monuments ==
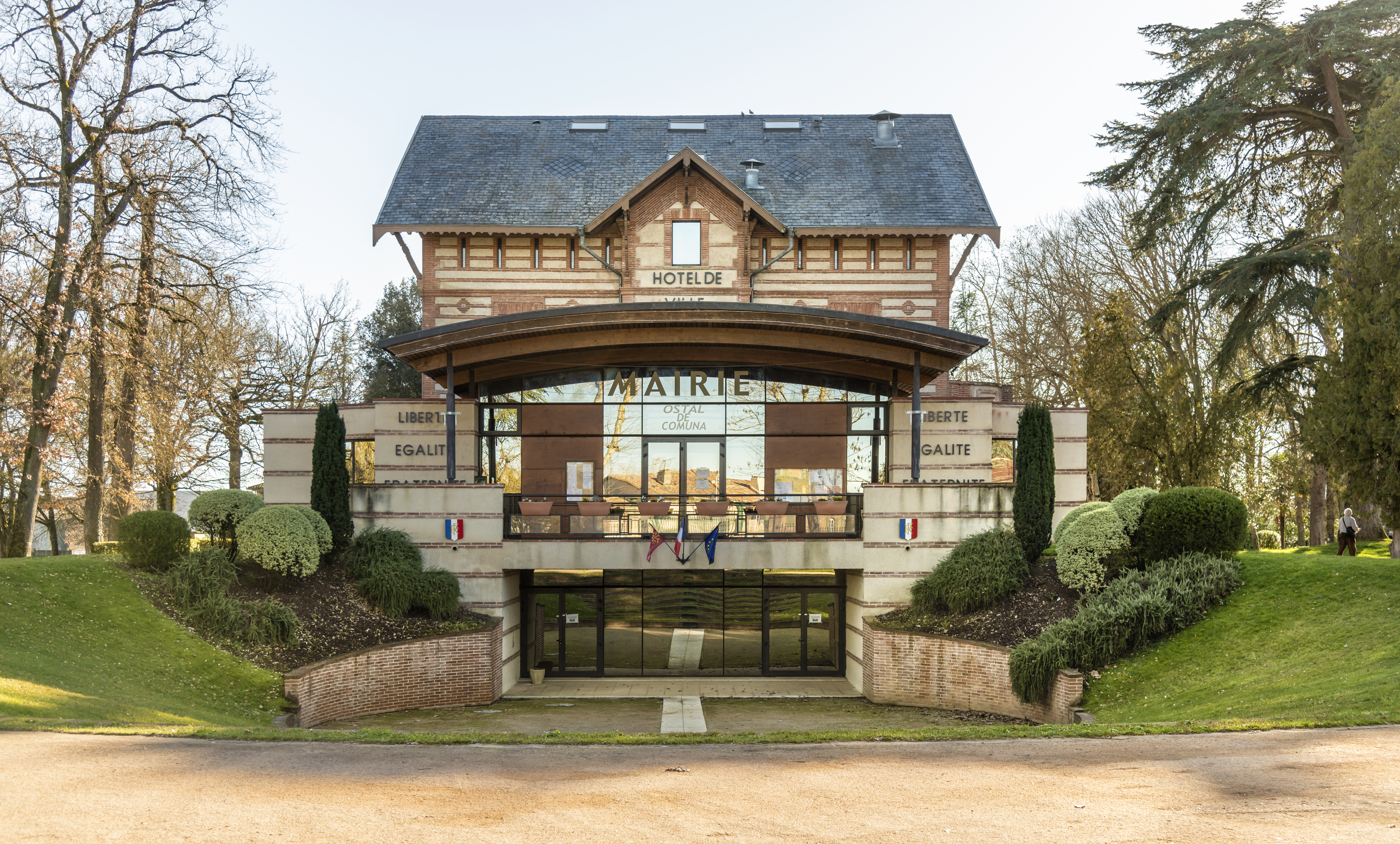
Town hall

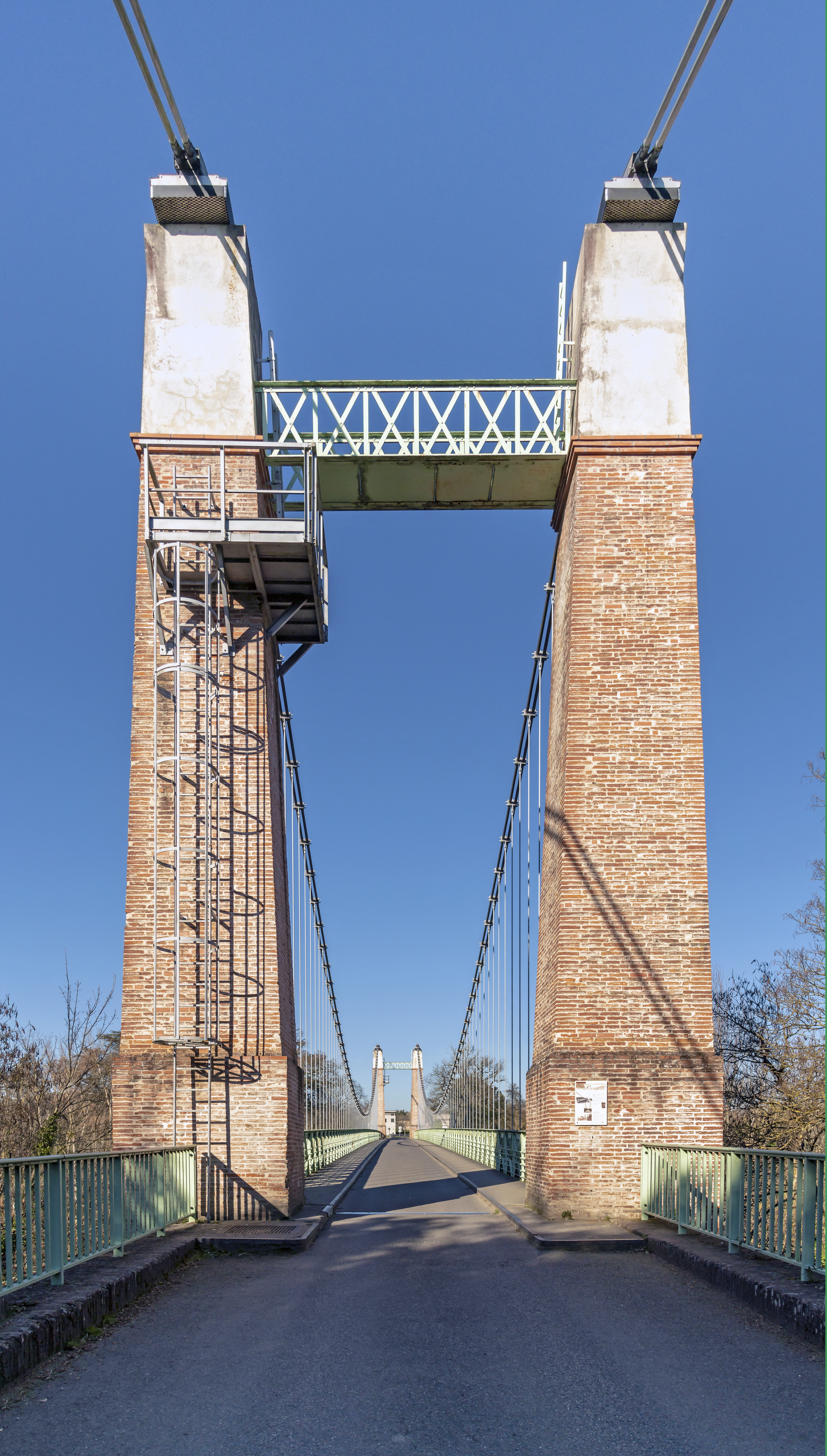
The suspension bridge over the Agout.

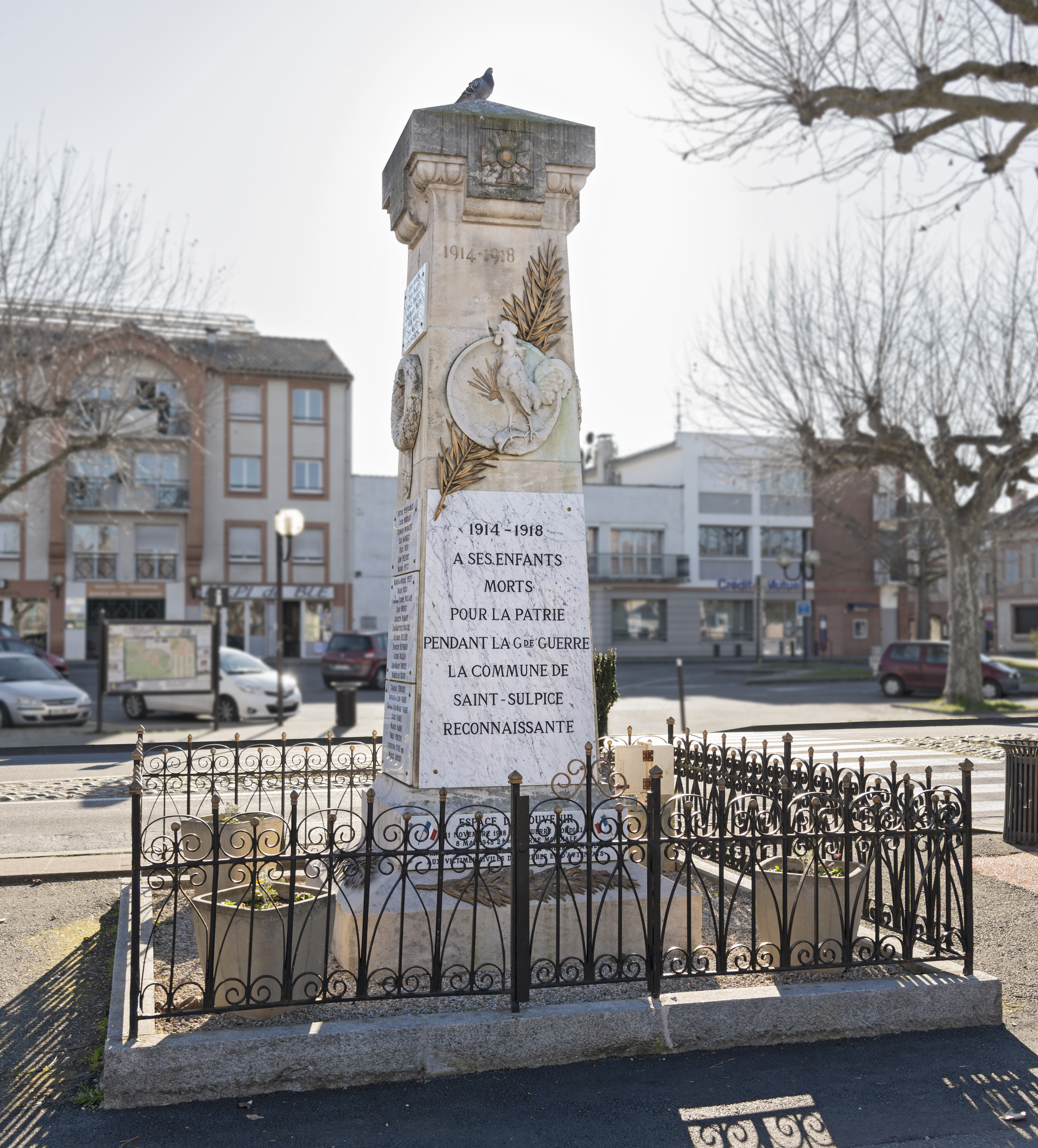
War memorial.

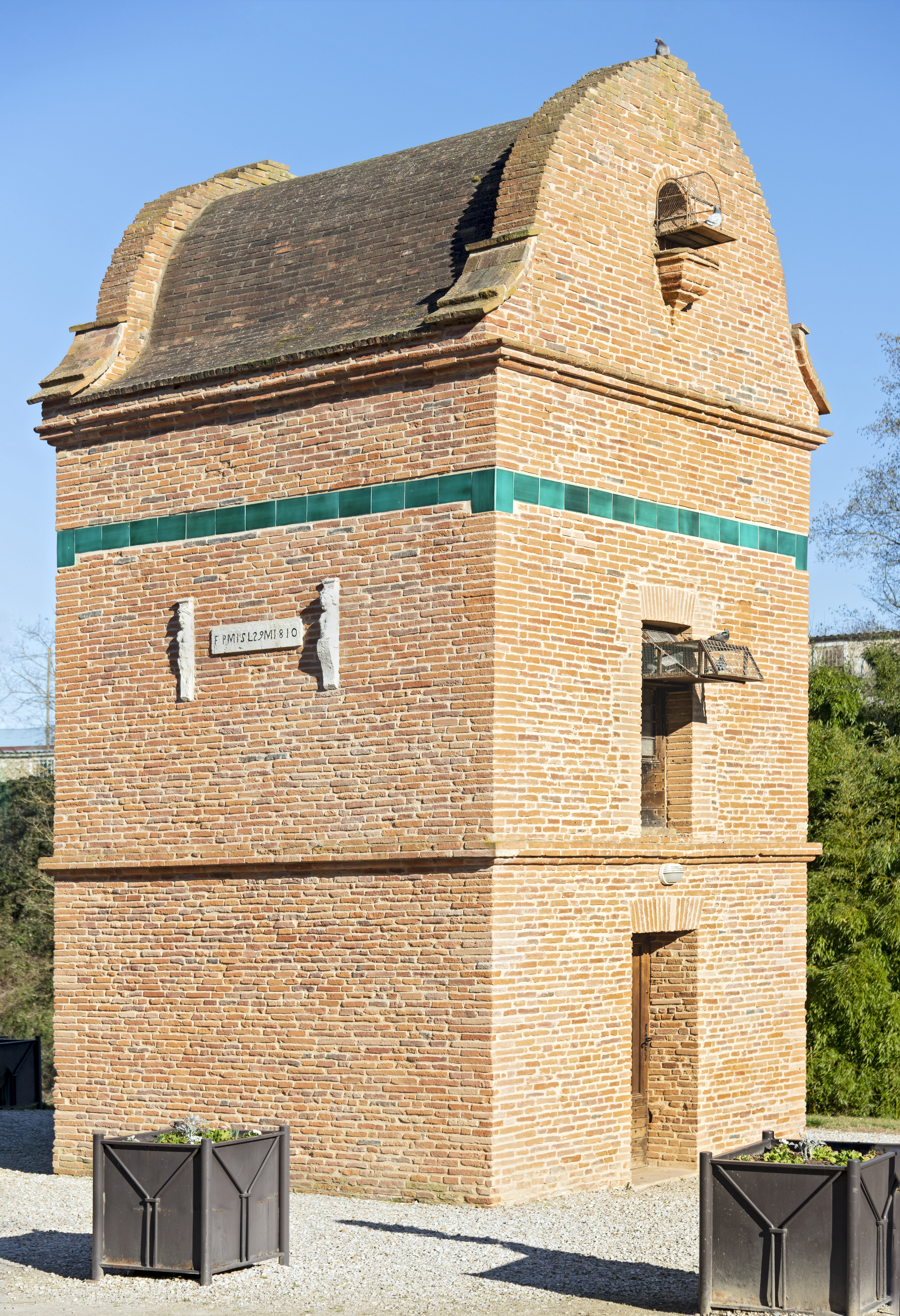
Dovecote from 1810

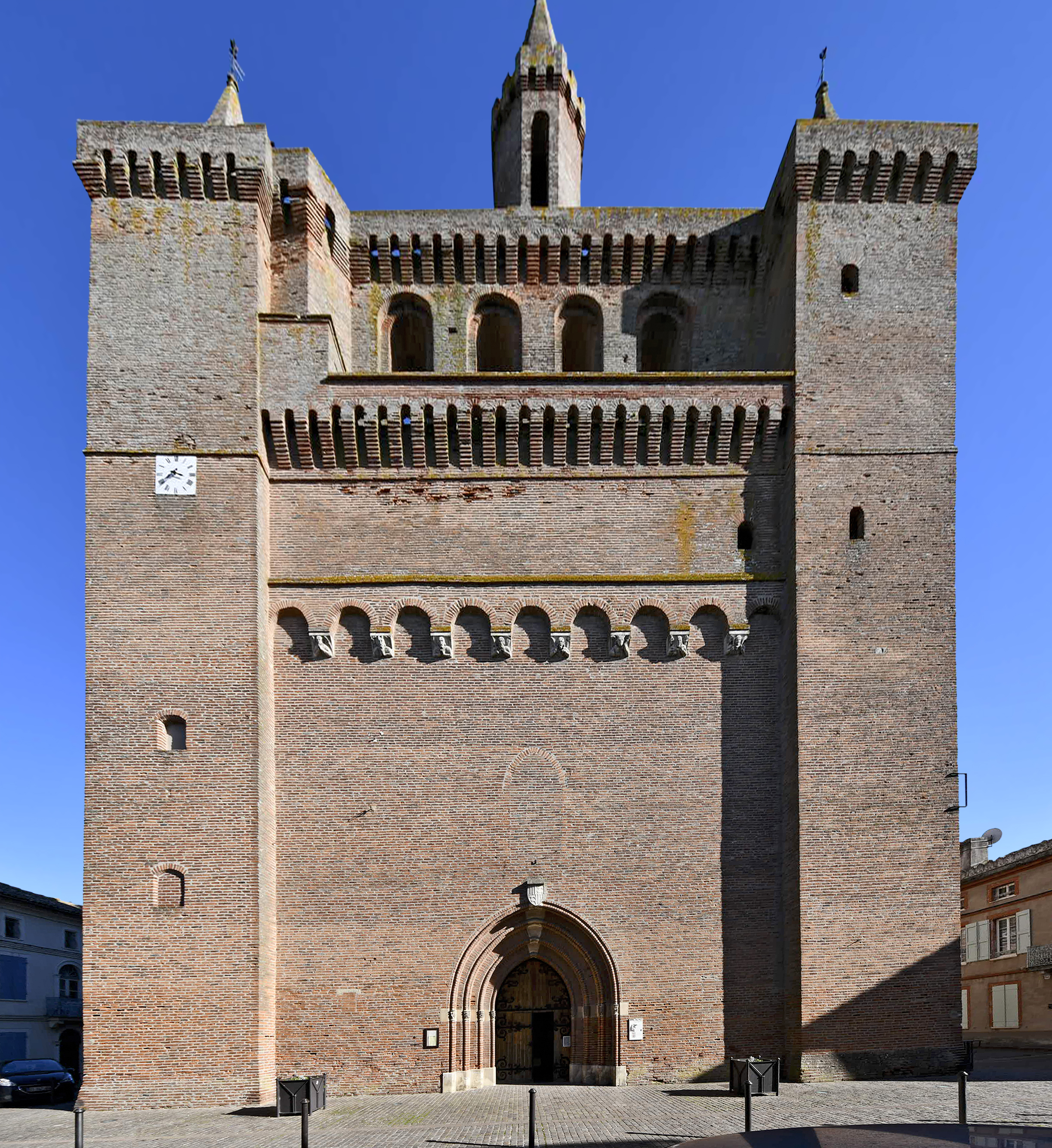
Church Notre-Dame

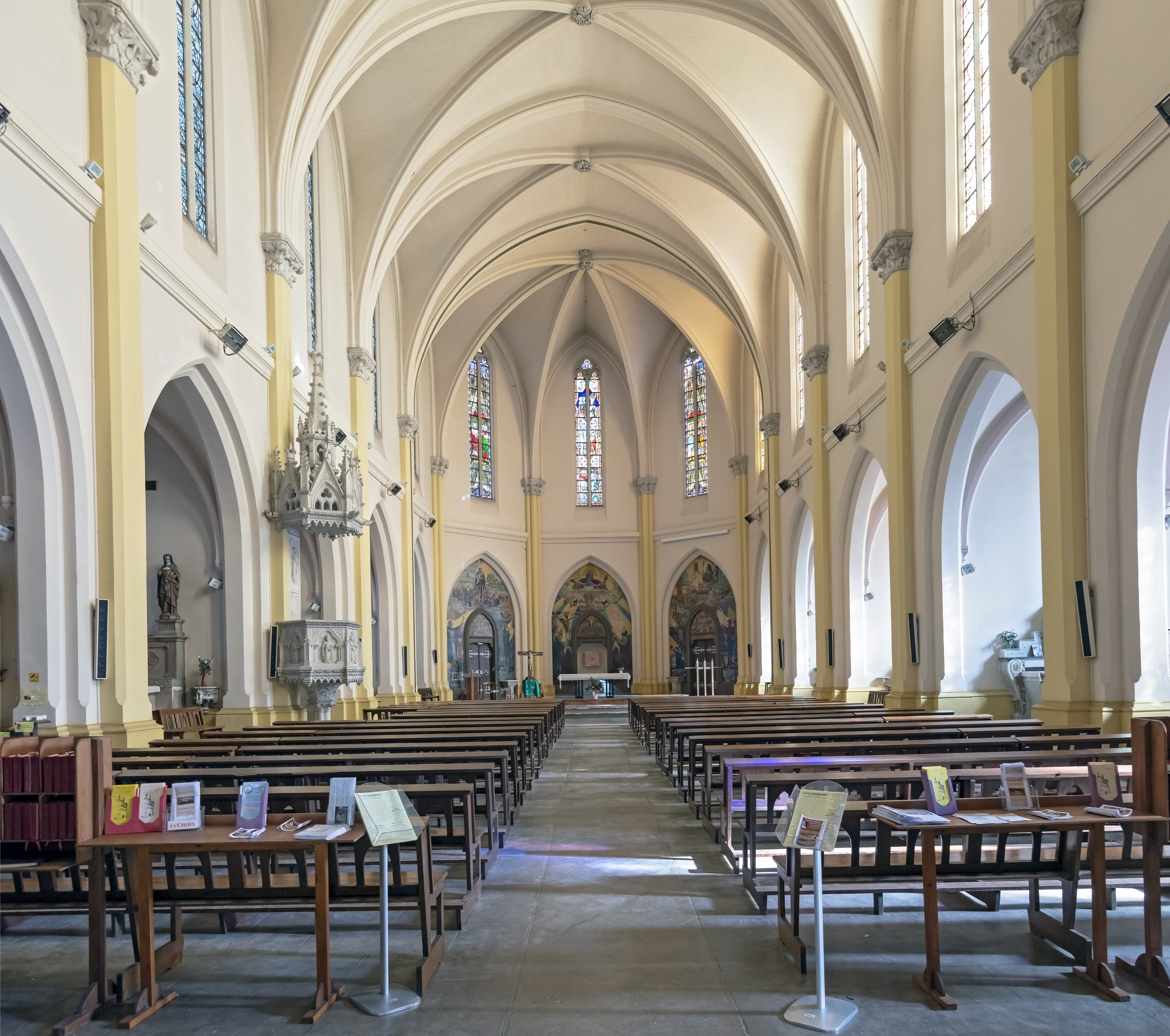
View of the nave

== See also ==
- Communes of the Tarn department
