= Toulouse-Matabiau station =

Main railway station in Toulouse, France

Coordinates: 43°36′40″N 1°27′13″E

Toulouse Matabiau
- The station building

General information
- Location: Boulevard de Marengo, 31000 Toulouse
- Owner: SNCF
- Lines: Bordeaux–Sète railway, Toulouse–Bayonne railway, Brive–Toulouse railway, Toulouse–Auch railway, Metro Line A
- Platforms: 13 (1–11, A-B)
- Tracks: 12

Construction
- Structure type: Ground
- Parking: Yes
- Cycle facilities: Yes

Other information
- Station code: 87611004

History
- Opened: 1905

Passengers
- 2024: 14,522,596
Services
Preceding station	SNCF	Following station
Terminus	TGV inOui	Carcassonne towards Lyon-Part-Dieu
Terminus	TGV inOui	Montauban-Ville-Bourbon towards Montparnasse
Preceding station	Ouigo	Following station
Montauban towards Paris-Montparnasse	Grande Vitesse	Terminus
Preceding station	SNCF	Following station
Montauban towards Bordeaux	Intercités	Carcassonne towards Marseille
Saint-Gaudens towards Hendaye	Intercités	Terminus
Montauban towards Paris-Austerlitz	Intercités	Terminus
Montauban towards Paris-Austerlitz	Intercités (night)	Terminus
Preceding station	TER Occitanie	Following station
Terminus	2	Montrabé towards Rodez
Terminus	3	Saint-Sulpice towards Aurillac
Terminus	9	Montrabé towards Mazamet
Terminus	10	Montaudran towards Narbonne
Terminus	11	Toulouse-Saint-Agne towards Latour-de-Carol
Toulouse-Saint-Agne towards Pau	15	Terminus
Terminus	16	Toulouse-Saint-Agne towards Auch
Castelnau-d'Estrétefonds towards Agen	18	Terminus
Lacourtensourt towards Brive-la-Gaillarde	19	Terminus
Montaudran towards Portbou	25	Terminus
Location

Toulouse-Matabiau is the main railway station in Toulouse, southern France. It is in the city centre and connected to the Toulouse Metro. The station is situated on the Bordeaux–Sète railway, Toulouse–Bayonne railway, Brive–Toulouse (via Capdenac) railway and Toulouse–Auch railway. Direct trains run to most parts of France.

== History ==
Main entrance of Matabiau station

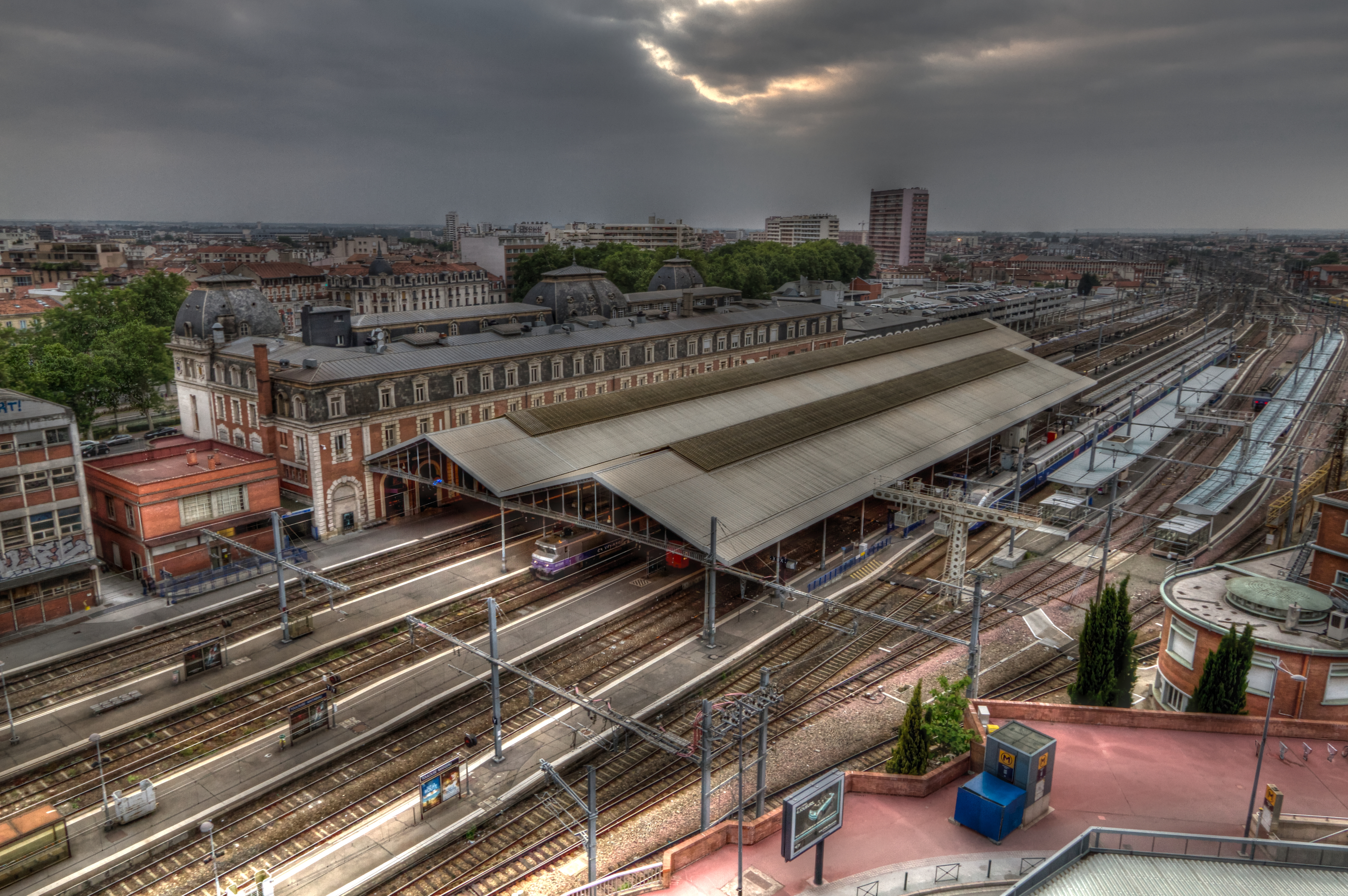
Trainshed and platforms

Toulouse waited until the middle of the 19th century for the railway to arrive in the city.

In 1853, Émile Pereire and his brother Jacob founded the CF du Midi. Three years later, the line from Bordeaux to Toulouse was opened, it was extended to Sète in 1857.

The current passenger building at the main railway station of Toulouse was built between 1903 and 1905, replacing an older and smaller building. The station took the name of the borough, an area called Matabiau, named after the martyrdom of Saint Saturnin, mata-bios meaning kill the bull. It was designed by Marius Toudoire (who also designed Bordeaux Station) and was built with stone from the Roman city of Saintes. Like the Midi station in Bordeaux, Matabiau station bears 26 coats of arms on the front of the building of the 26 destinations that Midi served.

Some work was carried out on the building in 1938 prior to its listing.

== Layout ==
The station is centred on two main concourses at the front of the station directly linked to each other, with ticket offices, shops and cafés. Underpasses link these concourses to the platforms. The station is connected to the underground Marengo SNCF station on Line A of the Toulouse Metro, accessible from inside and just outside the station.

== Destinations ==
Toulouse-Matabiau is situated at the heart of a six-branch star network of lines with both regional (TER) and national (TGV and Corail) services.

Toulouse is served by the following regional lines:

- Toulouse–Albi-Rodez
- Toulouse–Montauban
- Toulouse–Saint-Sulpice
- Toulouse–Carcassonne
- Toulouse–Tarbes and Bayonne
- Toulouse–Foix
- Toulouse–Auch

Several SNCF facilities are present near the station, including the old Toulouse-Raynal goods yard now a carriage and engine maintenance yard and the large Saint-Jory marshalling yard 15 kilometres (9.3 mi) to the north.

== Train services ==
The following services currently call at Toulouse-Matabiau:

- high-speed services (TGV)
  - Paris–Tours–Bordeaux–Toulouse
  - Toulouse–Montpellier–Lyon
- intercity services (Intercités)
  - Paris–Vierzon–Limoges–Toulouse
  - Bordeaux–Toulouse–Montpellier–Marseille
  - Bayonne–Pau–Tarbes–Toulouse
- night services (Intercités de Nuit)
  - Paris–Souillac-Toulouse
- local service (TER Occitanie)
  - Toulouse–Carcassonne–Narbonne
  - Toulouse–Albi–Rodez
  - Toulouse–Figeac–Aurillac
  - Brive-la-Gaillarde–Cahors–Montauban–Toulouse
  - Montauban–Toulouse
  - Agen–Montauban–Toulouse
  - Toulouse–Castres–Mazamet
  - Toulouse–Castelnaudary–Carcassonne
  - Toulouse–Colomiers–Auch
  - Toulouse–Foix–Latour-de-Carol-Enveitg
  - Toulouse–Saint-Gaudens–Tarbes–Pau

== Future ==
The station is currently being renovated, with the inside of the historic building being refurbished.

A new building will be built on the other side of the tracks. This new expansion will include connections to the current line A metro station and to the new line C metro station, which is currently under construction. It will also provide other various services.

== Gallery ==
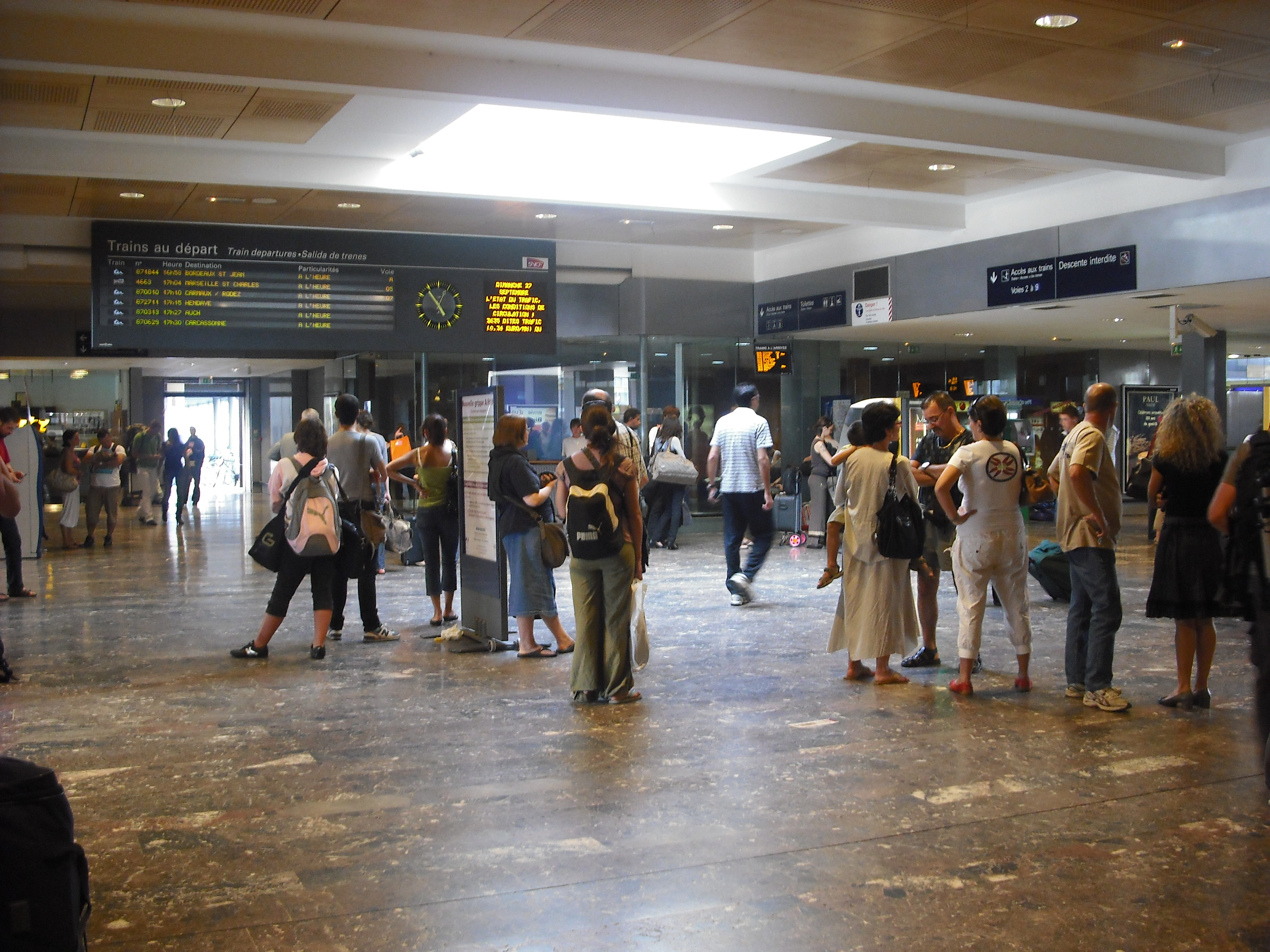
The western concourse

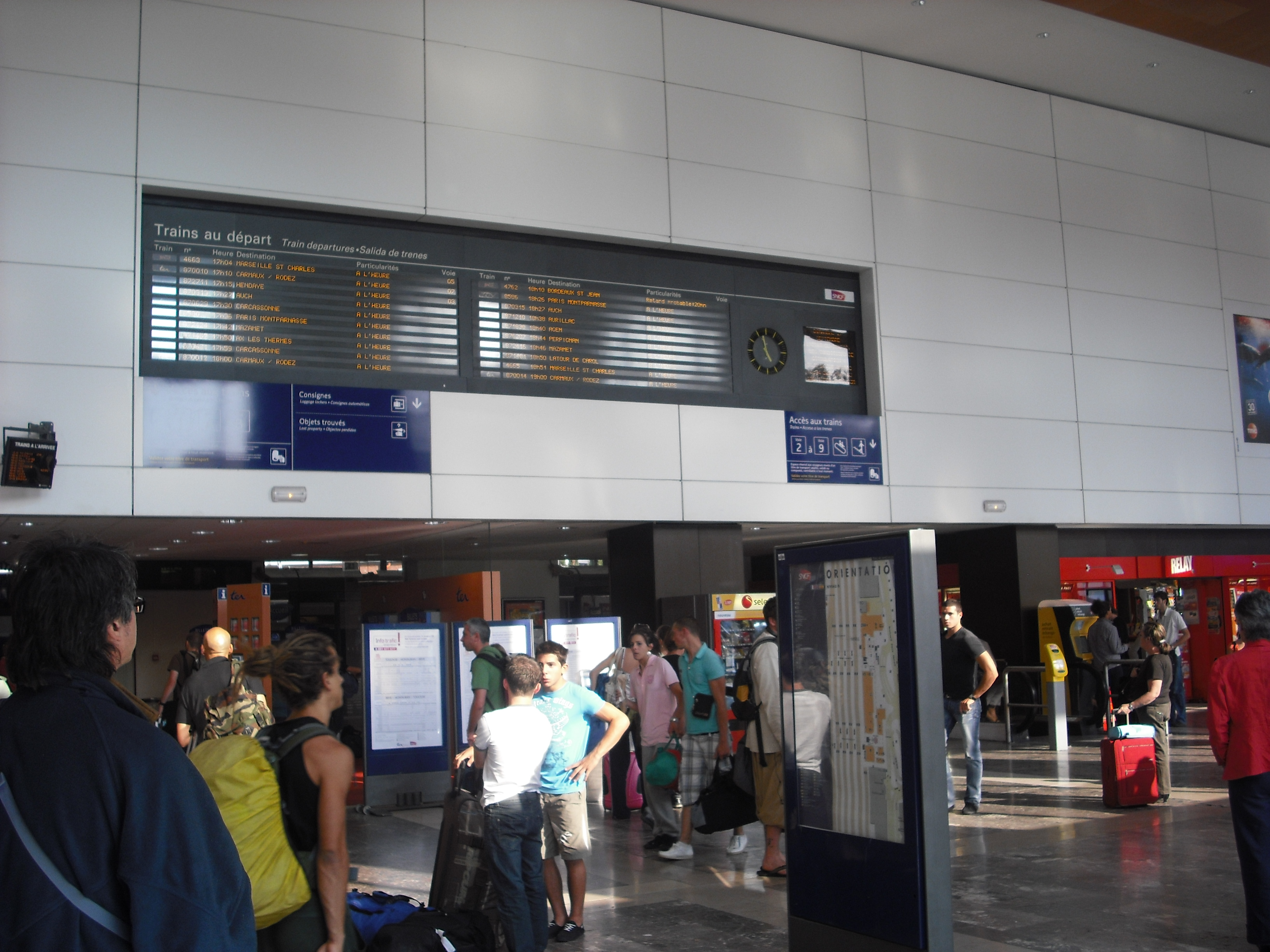
The eastern concourse

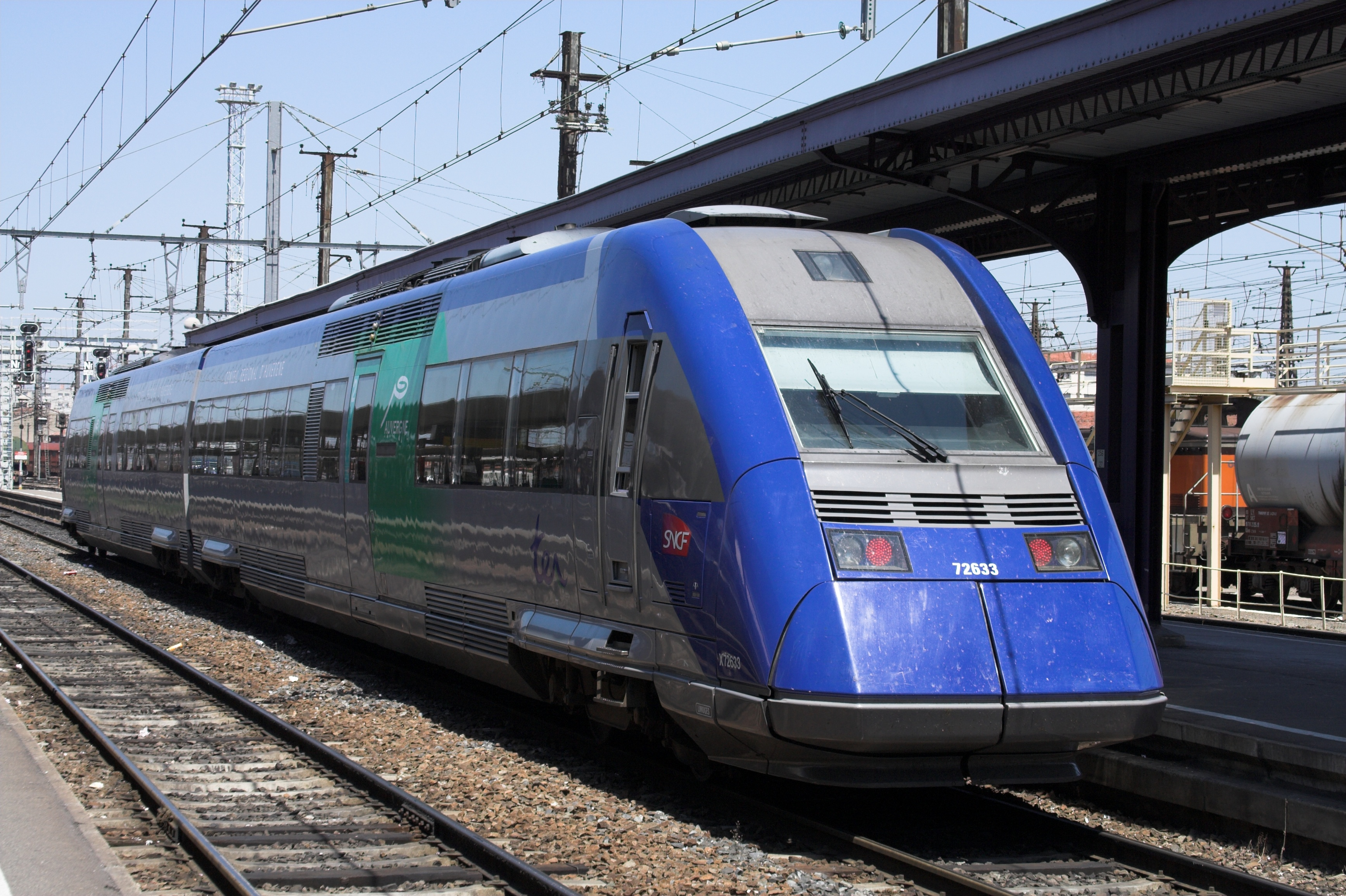
An X72500 at Toulouse-Matabiau

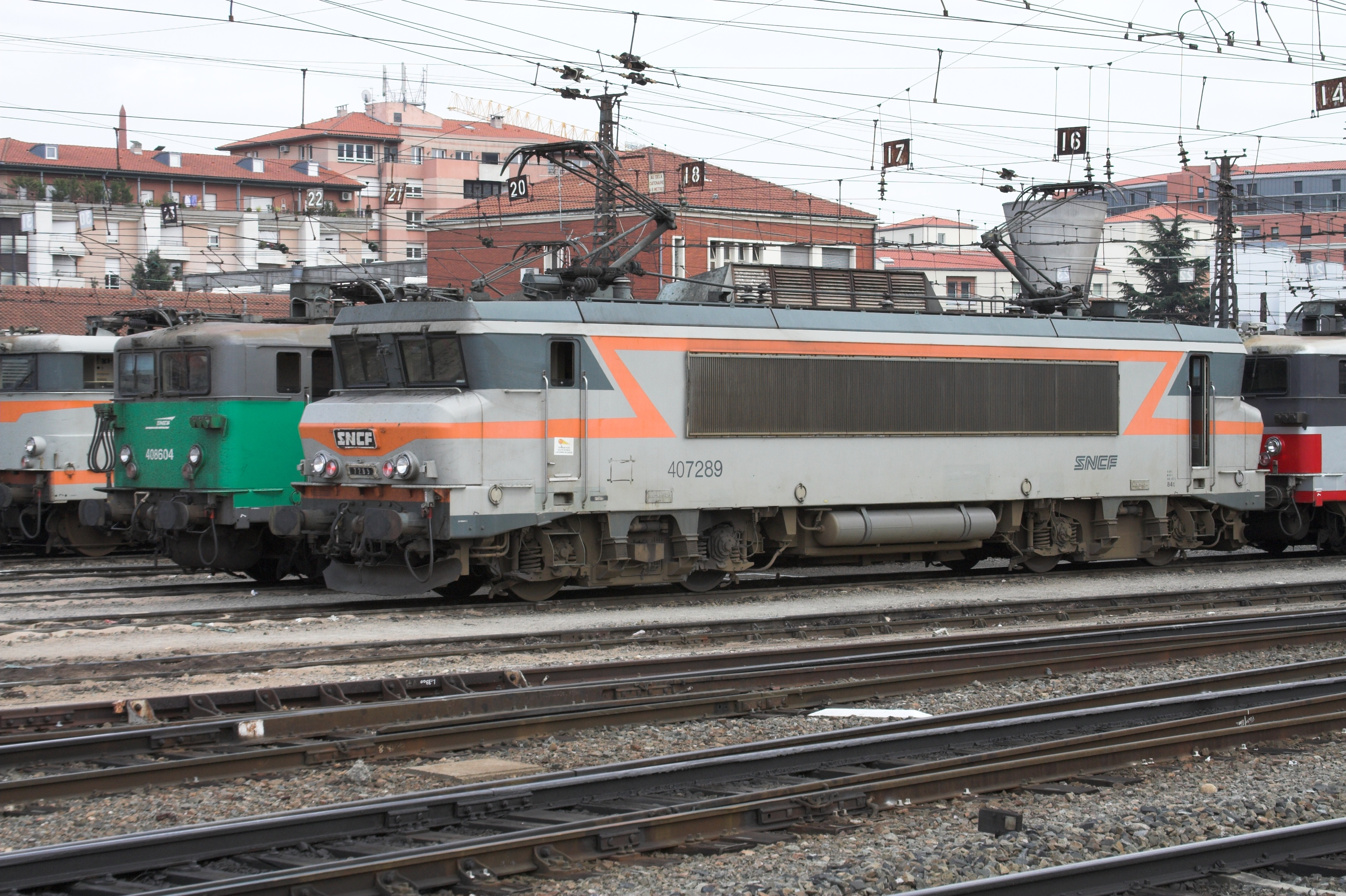
A selection of SNCF locos at Toulouse-Matabiau

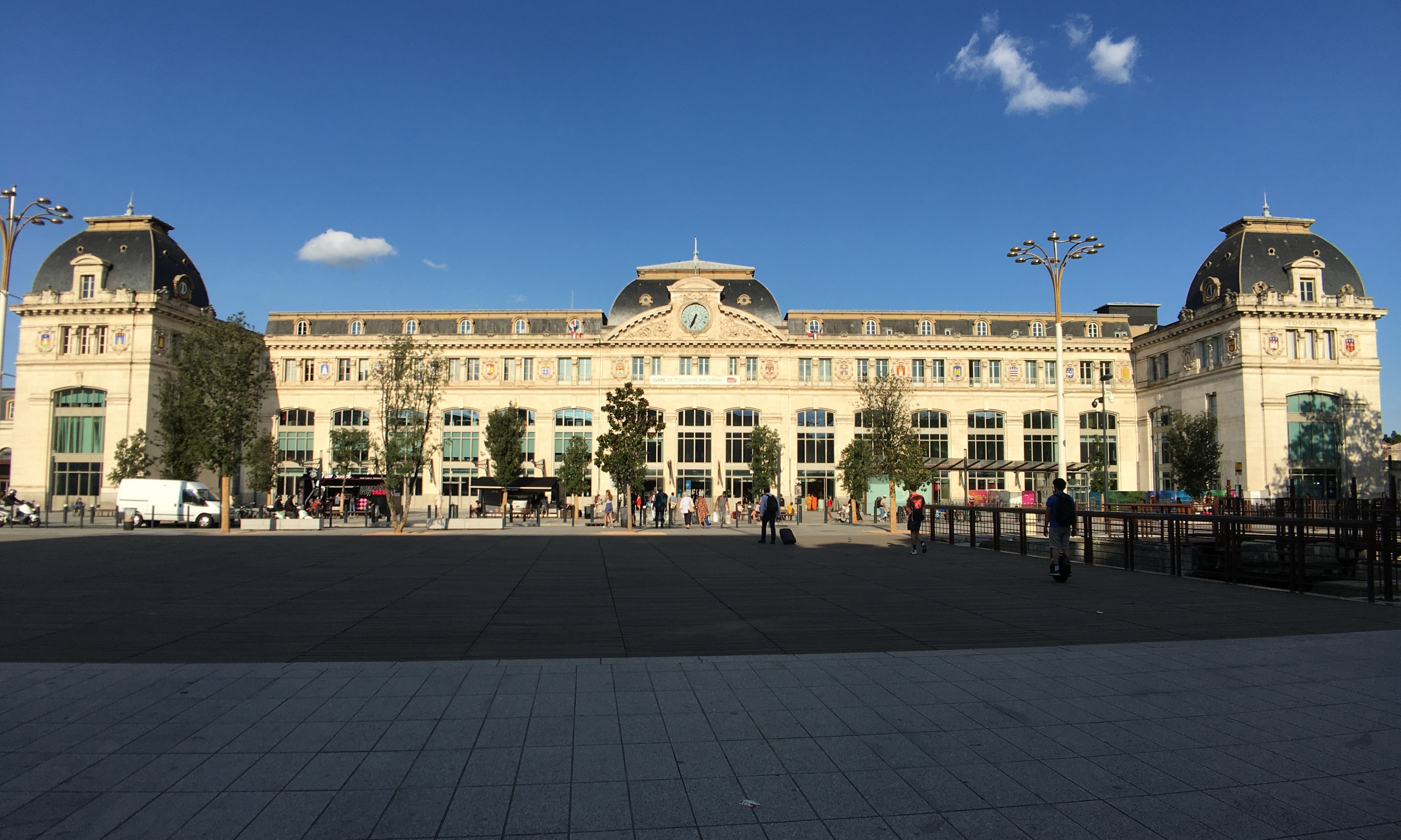
The main facade after renovation of the square in 2021
