= List of windmills in Haute-Garonne =

A list of windmills in Haute-Garonne, France

Location	Name of mill	Type	Built	Notes	Photograph
Albiac	Moulin d'Albiac				
Aurin	Moulin d'Entoutet	Moulin Tour			
Avignonet-Lauragais	Moulin de Saint Laurent	Moulin Tour		Moulins a Vent (in French)	
Avignonet-Lauragais	Moulin de la Tuilerie				
Belesta-en-Lauragais	Moulin En Vincens	Moulin Tour		Moulins a Vent (in French)	
Brignemont	Moulin de Brignemont	Moulin Tour	1740	Moulins a Vent (in French)	
Cambiac	Moulin Neuf				
Caragoudes	Moulin de la Paillasse	Moulin Tour	1649	Ministère de la Culture] (in French)	
Caraman	Moulins de la Lande			Two mills?	
Castelgaillard	Moulin de Loulé	Moulin Tour		Moulins a Vent (in French)	
Cintegabelle	Moulin de Cintegabelle	Moulin Tour		Moulins a Vent (in French)	
Espanès	Moulin du Château				
Falga		Moulin Tour			
Fourquevaux	Moulin de Fourquevaux				
Francarville	Moulin de Francarville				
Gardouch	Moulin de Gardouch				
Labastide-Beauvoir	Moulin de Labastide Beauvoir				
Labastide-Paumès	Moulin de Labastide-Paumès No. 1	Moulin Tour		Moulins a Vent (in French)	
Labastide-Paumès	Moulin de Labastide-Paumès No. 2	Moulin Tour		Moulins a Vent (in French)	
Lanta-Saint-Anatoly	Moulins de Lanta Saint Anatoly			Two mills?	
Le Burgaud	Moulin de Fumadès	Moulin Tour		Moulins a Vent (in French)	
Le Burgaud	Moulin de Montlauzin	Moulin Tour		Moulins a Vent (in French)	
L'Isle-en-Dodon	Moulin de Saint Laurent	Moulin Tour		Moulins a Vent (in French)	
Loubens-Lauragais	Moulin de Loubens-Lauragais No. 1	Moulin Tour			
Loubens-Lauragais	Moulin de Loubens-Lauragais No. 2				
Mascarville	Moulin d'En Carretou	Moulin Tour			
Massabrac	Moulin de Massabrac	Moulin Tour		Moulins a Vent (in French)	
Montbrun-Lauragais	Moulin de Passelègue	Moulin Tour	1680	Moulins a Vent (in French)	
Montesquieu-Lauragais	Moulin de Montesquieu-Lauragais				
Montgeard	Moulin d'En Bas	Moulin Tour	Late 18th century	Moulins a Vent (in French)	
Montgeard	Moulin de Lapierre				
Montlaur	Moulin d'En Cas				
Montrabé	Moulin de Montrabé	Moulin Tour	1778	Moulins a Vent (in French)	
Mourvilles-Hautes	Moulin de Mourvilles Hautes	Moulin Tour	1571	Moulins a Vent (in French); Ministère de la Culture (in French)	
Nailloux	Moulin de Nailloux	Moulin Tour		Six sails Moulins a Vent (in French)	
Nailloux	Moulin de Lapin; Moulin de Nougaresse	Moulin Tour		Moulins a Vent (in French)	
Préserville	Moulin de Sainte Foy d'Aigrefeuille				
Saint-Araille	Moulin de Saint Araille	Moulin Tour		Moulins a Vent (in French)	
Saint-Félix-Lauragais	Moulin de la Croix	Moulin Tour			
Saint-Félix-Lauragais	Moulin de Salvy				
Saint-Lys	Moulin Belard	Moulin Tour		Moulins a Vent (in French)	
Saint-Sulpice-sur-Lèze	Moulin des Pesquies	Moulin Tour		Moulins a Vent (in French)	
Souyeaux	Moulin de Souyeaux	Moulin Tour		Moulins a Vent (in French)	
Toulouse	Moulin de Saint-Martin-du-Touch	Moulin Tour			
Toulouse	Moulin du Château de la Flambelle	Moulin Tour			
Toutens	Moulin de l'Hercule				
Trébons-sur-la-Grasse	Moulin de Trébons sur la Grasse No. 1	Moulin Tour		Moulins a Vent (in French)	
Trébons-sur-la-Grasse	Moulin de Trébons sur la Grasse No. 2	Moulin Tour		Moulins a Vent (in French)	
Vaux	Moulin Jumeaux No. 1	Moulin Tour		Moulins a Vent (in French)	
Vaux	Moulin Jumeaux No. 2	Moulin Tour		Moulins a Vent (in French)	
Vaux	Moulin de Vaux	Moulin Tour		Moulins a Vent (in French)	
Villevigne	Moulin de la Serre	Moulin Tour		Moulins a Vent (in French)	
Villefranche-de-Lauragais	Les Vieux Moulins			Two mills?	
