= Aignes =

- Commune
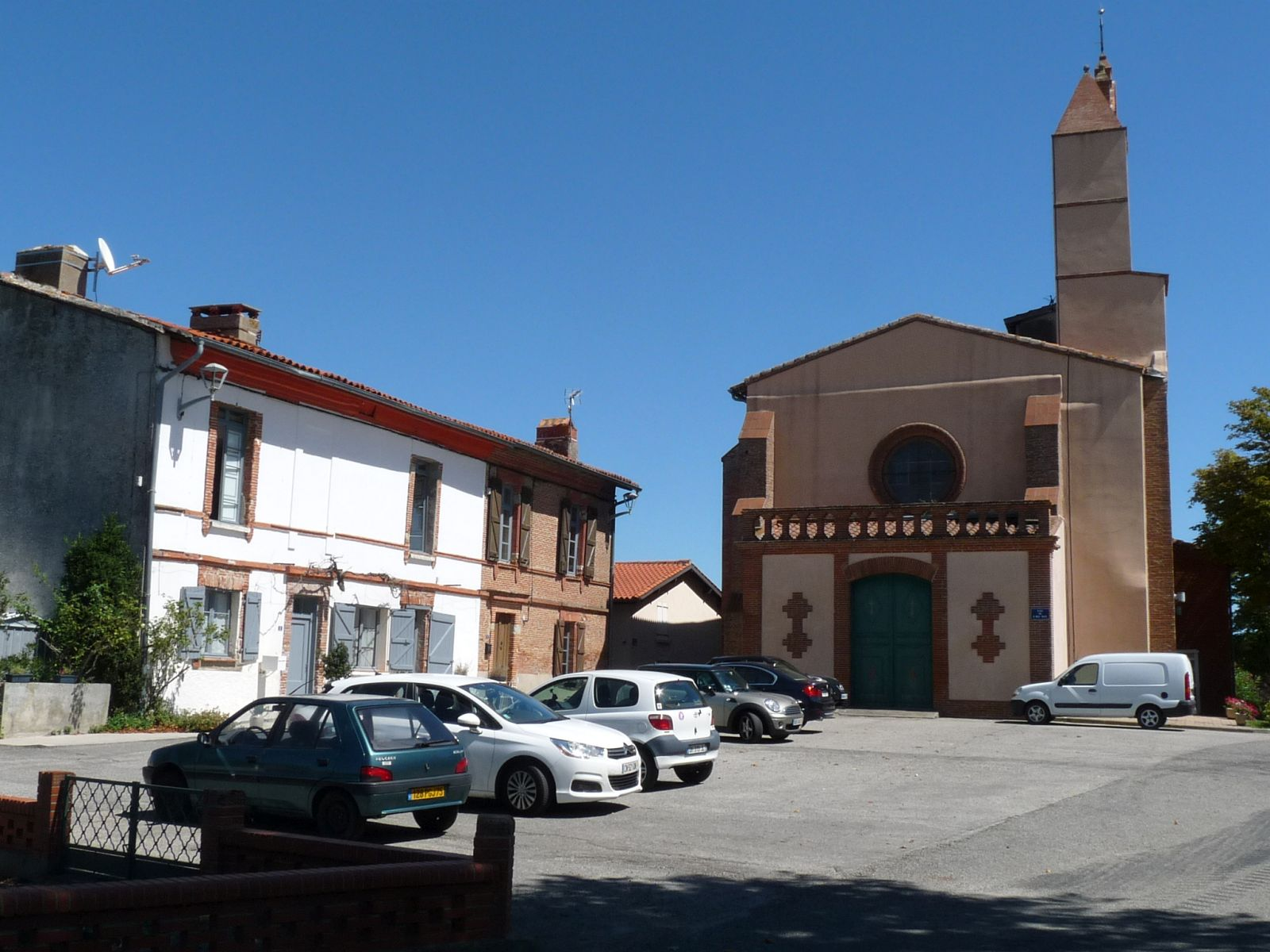
- The church in Aignes
- Location of Aignes
- Location within France Location within Occitanie
- Coordinates: 43°19′16″N 1°35′22″E
- Country: France
- Region: Occitania
- Department: Haute-Garonne
- Arrondissement: Toulouse
- Canton: Escalquens
- Intercommunality: Terres du Lauragais

Government
  - Mayor (2022–2026): Patrice Ramond
- Area^{1}: 21.81 km^{2} (8.42 sq mi)
- Elevation: 300 m (980 ft)
- Highest elevation: 323 m (1,060 ft)
- Lowest elevation: 198 m (650 ft)
- Population (2023): 242
  - Density: 11.1/km^{2} (28.7/sq mi)
- Time zone: UTC+01:00 (CET)
  - Summer (DST): UTC+02:00 (CEST)
- INSEE/Postal code: 31002 /31550
- ^{1} French Land Register data, which excludes lakes, ponds, glaciers > 1 km^{2} (0.386 sq mi or 247 acres) and river estuaries.

Aignes (French pronunciation: [ɛɲ]; Occitan: Anhas) is a commune in the Haute-Garonne department in southwestern France.

== Geography ==
The commune is bordered by six other communes: Saint-Léon to the north, Nailloux to the northeast, Montgeard to the east, Calmont to the south, Cintegabelle to the west, and finally by Mauvaisin to the southwest.

== Population ==
Historical population
| Year | Pop. | ±% p.a. |
|---|---|---|
| 1968 | 219 | — |
| 1975 | 184 | −2.46% |
| 1982 | 176 | −0.63% |
| 1990 | 168 | −0.58% |
| 1999 | 193 | +1.55% |
| 2007 | 231 | +2.27% |
| 2012 | 243 | +1.02% |
| 2017 | 245 | +0.16% |
| 2023 | 242 | −0.21% |
Source: INSEE

== See also ==
- Communes of the Haute-Garonne department
