= Aigrefeuille, Haute-Garonne =

Aigrefeuille Crefuèlha (Occitan)
- Commune
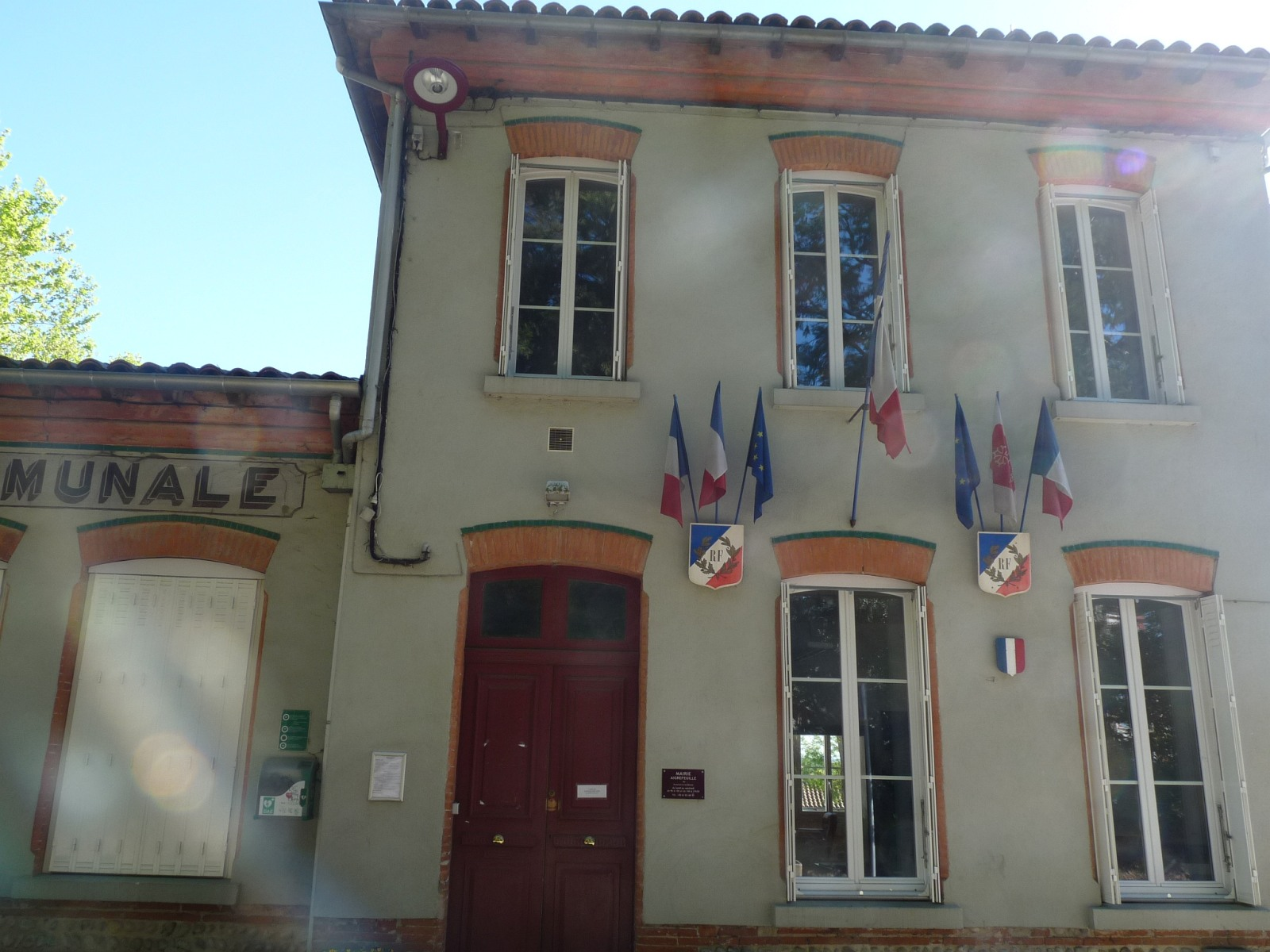
- The town hall in Aigrefeuille

- Coat of arms
- Location of Aigrefeuille
- Location within France Location within Occitanie
- Coordinates: 43°34′07″N 1°35′28″E
- Country: France
- Region: Occitania
- Department: Haute-Garonne
- Arrondissement: Toulouse
- Canton: Escalquens
- Intercommunality: Toulouse Métropole

Government
  - Mayor (2020–2026): Christian André
- Area^{1}: 4.62 km^{2} (1.78 sq mi)
- Elevation: 221 m (725 ft)
- Highest elevation: 230 m (750 ft)
- Lowest elevation: 151 m (495 ft)
- Population (2023): 1,369
  - Density: 296/km^{2} (767/sq mi)
- Time zone: UTC+01:00 (CET)
  - Summer (DST): UTC+02:00 (CEST)
- INSEE/Postal code: 31003 /31280
- ^{1} French Land Register data, which excludes lakes, ponds, glaciers > 1 km^{2} (0.386 sq mi or 247 acres) and river estuaries.

Aigrefeuille (French pronunciation: [ɛɡʁəfœj]; Occitan: Crefuèlha) is a commune in the Haute-Garonne department in southwestern France.

== Geography ==
The commune is bordered by four other communes: Drémil-Lafage to the north, Sainte-Foy-d'Aigrefeuille to the southeast, Lauzerville to the southwest, and finally by Quint-Fonsegrives to the west.

== Population ==
The inhabitants of the commune are known as Aigrefeuillois in French.

Historical population
Year	Pop.	±% p.a.
1968	124	—
1975	135	+1.22%
1982	172	+3.52%
1990	245	+4.52%
1999	577	+9.99%
2007	808	+4.30%
2012	1,135	+7.03%
2017	1,275	+2.35%
2023	1,369	+1.19%
Source: INSEE

== See also ==
- Communes of the Haute-Garonne department
