= Aigrefeuille =

Aigrefeuille may refer to several communes in France:

- Aigrefeuille, Haute-Garonne
- Aigrefeuille-d'Aunis, Charente-Maritime
- Aigrefeuille-sur-Maine, Loire-Atlantique
