= Canton of Escalquens =

Coordinates: 43.52°N 1.56°E

The canton of Escalquens is an administrative division of the Haute-Garonne department, southern France. It was created at the French canton reorganisation which came into effect in March 2015. Its seat is in Escalquens.

It consists of the following communes:

1. Aignes
2. Aigrefeuille
3. Auragne
4. Ayguesvives
5. Baziège
6. Belberaud
7. Belbèze-de-Lauragais
8. Caignac
9. Calmont
10. Corronsac
11. Deyme
12. Donneville
13. Escalquens
14. Espanès
15. Fourquevaux
16. Gibel
17. Issus
18. Labastide-Beauvoir
19. Lauzerville
20. Mauvaisin
21. Monestrol
22. Montbrun-Lauragais
23. Montgeard
24. Montgiscard
25. Montlaur
26. Nailloux
27. Noueilles
28. Odars
29. Pompertuzat
30. Pouze
31. Préserville
32. Sainte-Foy-d'Aigrefeuille
33. Saint-Léon
34. Seyre
35. Varennes
