= Monestrol =

- Commune
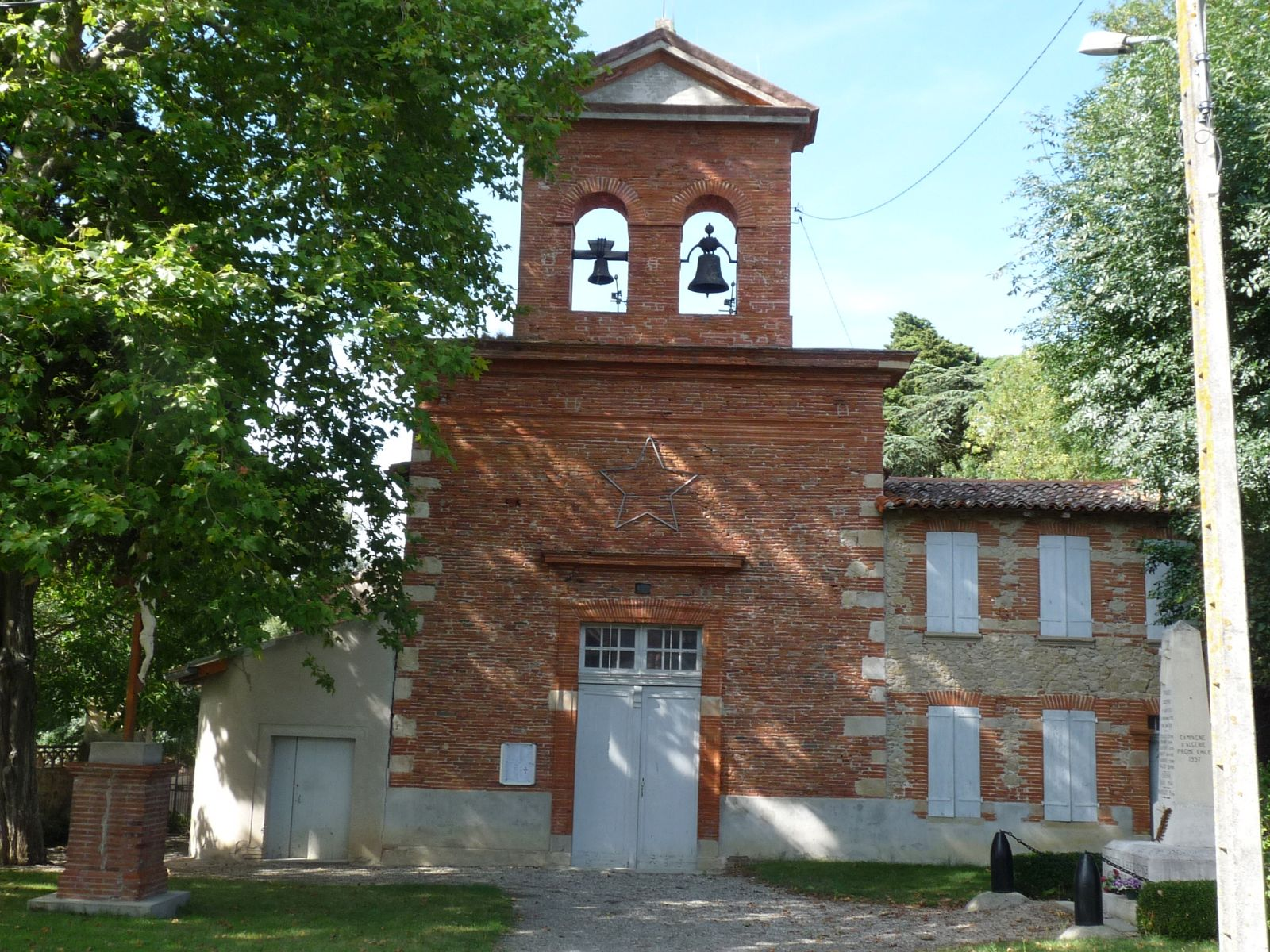
- The church in Monestrol

- Coat of arms
- Location of Monestrol
- Location within France Location within Occitanie
- Coordinates: 43°20′04″N 1°40′16″E
- Country: France
- Region: Occitania
- Department: Haute-Garonne
- Arrondissement: Toulouse
- Canton: Escalquens

Government
  - Mayor (2020–2026): Guilhem Rial
- Area^{1}: 5.23 km^{2} (2.02 sq mi)
- Elevation: 260 m (850 ft)
- Highest elevation: 302 m (991 ft)
- Lowest elevation: 209 m (686 ft)
- Population (2023): 57
  - Density: 11/km^{2} (28/sq mi)
- Time zone: UTC+01:00 (CET)
  - Summer (DST): UTC+02:00 (CEST)
- INSEE/Postal code: 31354 /31560
- ^{1} French Land Register data, which excludes lakes, ponds, glaciers > 1 km^{2} (0.386 sq mi or 247 acres) and river estuaries.

Monestrol (French pronunciation: [mɔnɛstʁɔl]; Occitan: Monestròl) is a commune in the Haute-Garonne department of southwestern France.

== Population ==
Historical population
Year	Pop.	±% p.a.
1968	76	—
1975	72	−0.77%
1982	80	+1.52%
1990	60	−3.53%
1999	55	−0.96%
2007	56	+0.23%
2012	62	+2.06%
2017	62	+0.00%
2023	57	−1.39%
Source: INSEE

== See also ==
- Communes of the Haute-Garonne department
