= Pouze =

- Commune
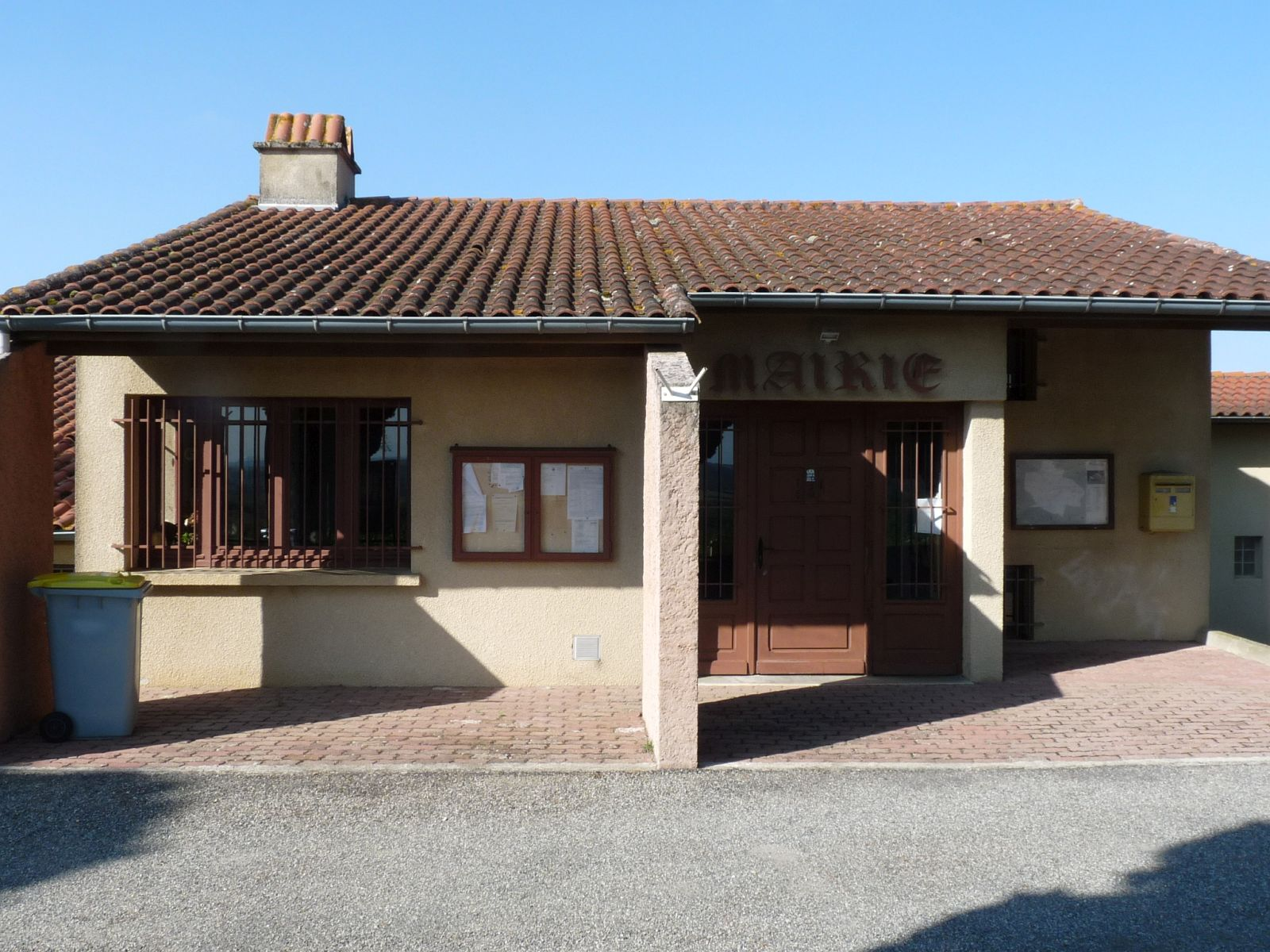
- The town hall in Pouze
- Location of Pouze
- Location within France Location within Occitanie
- Coordinates: 43°26′07″N 1°31′38″E
- Country: France
- Region: Occitania
- Department: Haute-Garonne
- Arrondissement: Toulouse
- Canton: Escalquens
- Intercommunality: CA Sicoval

Government
  - Mayor (2020–2026): Pierre Lattard
- Area^{1}: 3.82 km^{2} (1.47 sq mi)
- Elevation: 240 m (790 ft)
- Highest elevation: 273 m (896 ft)
- Lowest elevation: 199 m (653 ft)
- Population (2023): 89
  - Density: 23/km^{2} (60/sq mi)
- Time zone: UTC+01:00 (CET)
  - Summer (DST): UTC+02:00 (CEST)
- INSEE/Postal code: 31437 /31450
- ^{1} French Land Register data, which excludes lakes, ponds, glaciers > 1 km^{2} (0.386 sq mi or 247 acres) and river estuaries.

Pouze (French pronunciation: [puz]; Occitan: Posa) is a commune in the Haute-Garonne department in southwestern France.

== Population ==
Historical population
Year	Pop.	±% p.a.
1968	62	—
1975	59	−0.71%
1982	58	−0.24%
1990	75	+3.27%
1999	89	+1.92%
2007	100	+1.47%
2012	92	−1.65%
2017	88	−0.89%
2023	89	+0.19%
Source: INSEE

== See also ==
- Communes of the Haute-Garonne department
