= Gibel =

- Commune
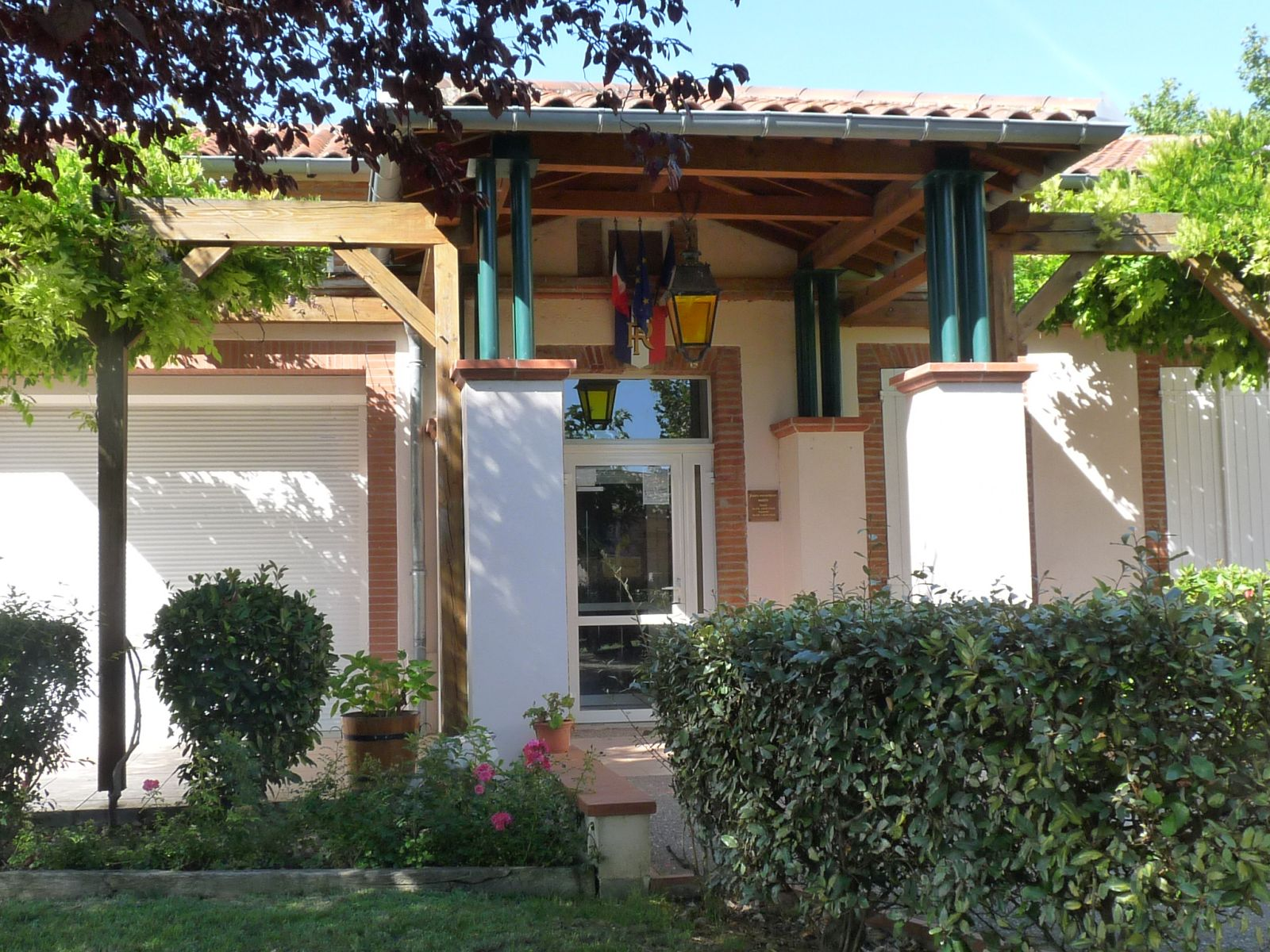
- The town hall in Gibel
- Location of Gibel
- Location within France Location within Occitanie
- Coordinates: 43°17′40″N 1°40′47″E
- Country: France
- Region: Occitania
- Department: Haute-Garonne
- Arrondissement: Toulouse
- Canton: Escalquens

Government
  - Mayor (2020–2026): Jeanpierre Bombail
- Area^{1}: 19.4 km^{2} (7.5 sq mi)
- Elevation: 301 m (988 ft)
- Highest elevation: 343 m (1,125 ft)
- Lowest elevation: 215 m (705 ft)
- Population (2023): 393
  - Density: 20.3/km^{2} (52.5/sq mi)
- Time zone: UTC+01:00 (CET)
  - Summer (DST): UTC+02:00 (CEST)
- INSEE/Postal code: 31220 /31560
- ^{1} French Land Register data, which excludes lakes, ponds, glaciers > 1 km^{2} (0.386 sq mi or 247 acres) and river estuaries.

Gibel (French pronunciation: [ʒibɛl]; Occitan: Gibèl) is a commune in the Haute-Garonne department in southwestern France.

== Population ==
Historical population
Year	Pop.	±% p.a.
1968	288	—
1975	223	−3.59%
1982	246	+1.41%
1990	207	−2.13%
1999	261	+2.61%
2007	266	+0.24%
2012	329	+4.34%
2017	361	+1.87%
2023	393	+1.43%
Source: INSEE

== See also ==
- Communes of the Haute-Garonne department
