= Communauté d'agglomération du Sicoval =

Sicoval
- Communauté d'agglomération
- Interactive map of Sicoval
- Coordinates: 43°29′N 01°32′E
- Country: France
- Region: Occitania
- Department: Haute-Garonne
- No. of communes: {{{nbcomm}}}
- Established: 2001
- Area: 248.4 km^{2} (95.9 sq mi)
- Population (2019): 80,357
  - Density: 323.5/km^{2} (837.9/sq mi)
- Website: www.sicoval.fr

Communauté d'agglomération du Sicoval is a communauté d'agglomération, an intercommunal structure, covering the southeastern suburbs of Toulouse. It is located in the Haute-Garonne department, in the Occitania region, southern France. Created in 2001, its seat is in Labège. Its area is 248.4 km^{2}. Its population was 80,357 in 2019.

== Composition ==
The communauté d'agglomération consists of the following 36 communes:

1. Aureville
2. Auzeville-Tolosane
3. Auzielle
4. Ayguesvives
5. Baziège
6. Belberaud
7. Belbèze-de-Lauragais
8. Castanet-Tolosan
9. Clermont-le-Fort
10. Corronsac
11. Deyme
12. Donneville
13. Escalquens
14. Espanès
15. Fourquevaux
16. Goyrans
17. Issus
18. Labastide-Beauvoir
19. Labège
20. Lacroix-Falgarde
21. Lauzerville
22. Mervilla
23. Montbrun-Lauragais
24. Montgiscard
25. Montlaur
26. Noueilles
27. Odars
28. Péchabou
29. Pechbusque
30. Pompertuzat
31. Pouze
32. Ramonville-Saint-Agne
33. Rebigue
34. Varennes
35. Vieille-Toulouse
36. Vigoulet-Auzil
