= Caignac =

- Commune
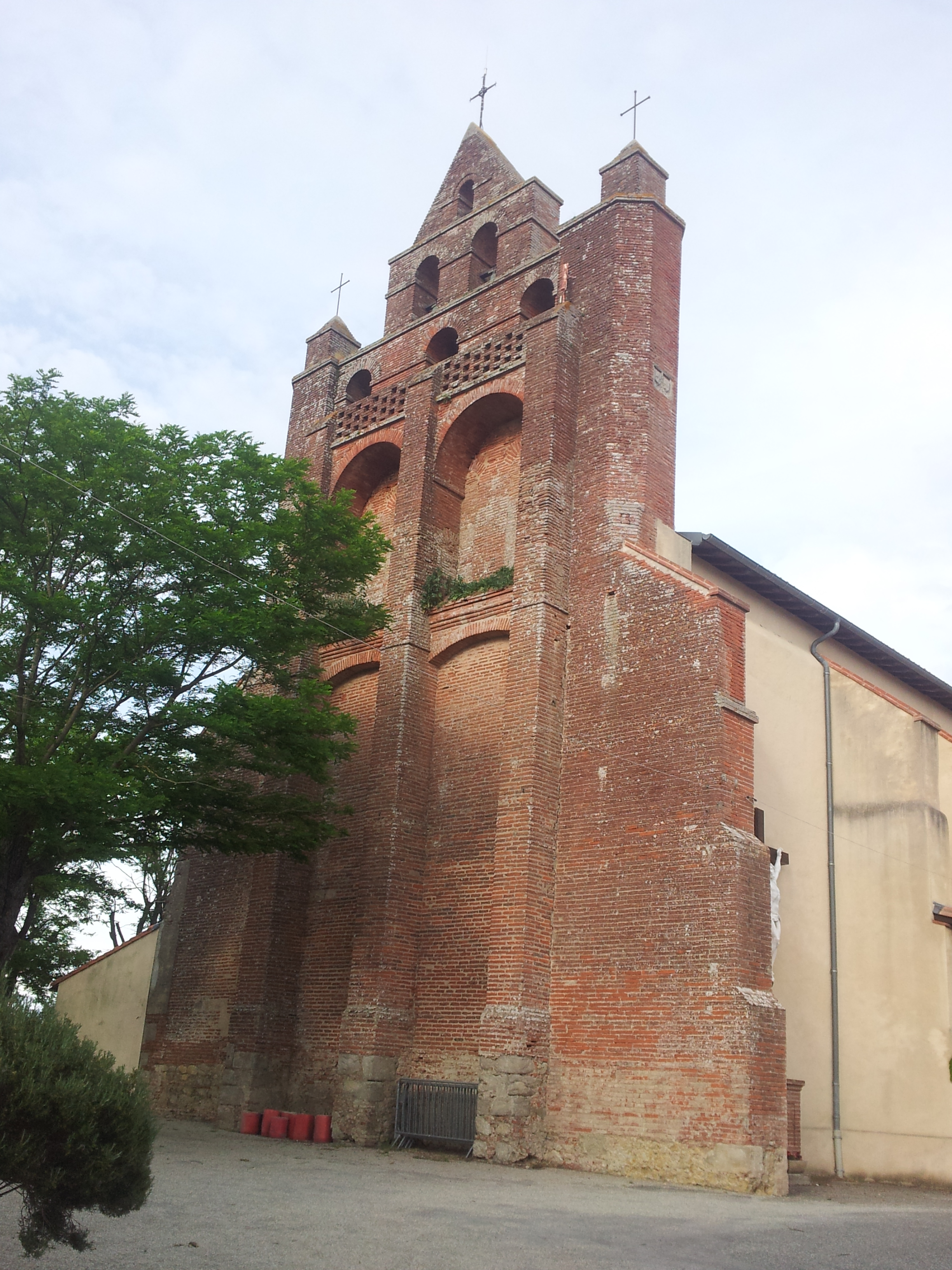
- The church in Caignac

- Coat of arms
- Location of Caignac
- Location within France Location within Occitanie
- Coordinates: 43°19′18″N 1°42′45″E
- Country: France
- Region: Occitania
- Department: Haute-Garonne
- Arrondissement: Toulouse
- Canton: Escalquens

Government
  - Mayor (2020–2026): Serge Barthes
- Area^{1}: 9.36 km^{2} (3.61 sq mi)
- Elevation: 265 m (869 ft)
- Highest elevation: 310 m (1,020 ft)
- Lowest elevation: 203 m (666 ft)
- Population (2023): 405
  - Density: 43.3/km^{2} (112/sq mi)
- Time zone: UTC+01:00 (CET)
  - Summer (DST): UTC+02:00 (CEST)
- INSEE/Postal code: 31099 /31560
- ^{1} French Land Register data, which excludes lakes, ponds, glaciers > 1 km^{2} (0.386 sq mi or 247 acres) and river estuaries.

Caignac (French pronunciation: [kɛɲak]; Occitan: Canhac) is a commune in the Haute-Garonne department in southwestern France.

== Population ==
Historical population
Year	Pop.	±% p.a.
1968	170	—
1975	152	−1.59%
1982	130	−2.21%
1990	161	+2.71%
1999	188	+1.74%
2007	249	+3.58%
2012	294	+3.38%
2017	356	+3.90%
2023	405	+2.17%
Source: INSEE

== See also ==
- Communes of the Haute-Garonne department
