= Pompertuzat =

- Commune
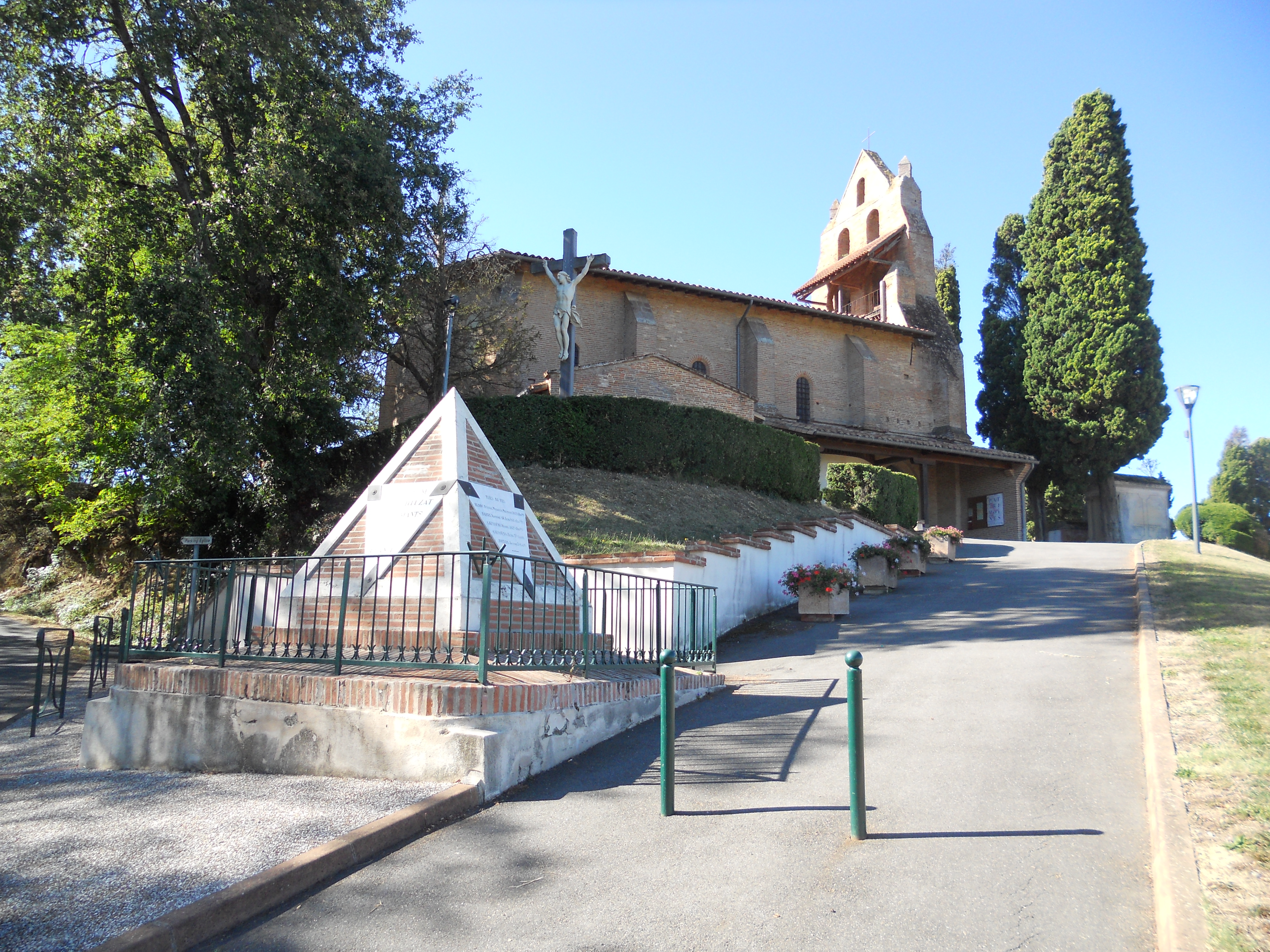
- The church in Pompertuzat

- Coat of arms
- Location of Pompertuzat
- Location within France Location within Occitanie
- Coordinates: 43°29′30″N 1°31′04″E
- Country: France
- Region: Occitania
- Department: Haute-Garonne
- Arrondissement: Toulouse
- Canton: Escalquens
- Intercommunality: CA Sicoval

Government
  - Mayor (2020–2026): Christine Galvani
- Area^{1}: 5.44 km^{2} (2.10 sq mi)
- Elevation: 155 m (509 ft)
- Highest elevation: 272 m (892 ft)
- Lowest elevation: 147 m (482 ft)
- Population (2023): 2,155
  - Density: 396/km^{2} (1,030/sq mi)
- Time zone: UTC+01:00 (CET)
  - Summer (DST): UTC+02:00 (CEST)
- INSEE/Postal code: 31429 /31450
- ^{1} French Land Register data, which excludes lakes, ponds, glaciers > 1 km^{2} (0.386 sq mi or 247 acres) and river estuaries.

Pompertuzat (French pronunciation: [pɔ̃pɛʁtyza]; Occitan: Pontpertusat) is a commune in the Haute-Garonne department in southwestern France.

== Population ==
Its residents are called Pompertuziens in French.

Historical population
Year	Pop.	±% p.a.
1968	342	—
1975	587	+8.02%
1982	699	+2.53%
1990	821	+2.03%
1999	1,208	+4.38%
2007	1,902	+5.84%
2012	2,064	+1.65%
2017	2,312	+2.30%
2023	2,155	−1.17%
Source: INSEE

== Geography ==
Municipality of the urban area of Toulouse in its urban center located in Lauragais on the Canal du Midi, at 15 km in the south of Toulouse.

== Administration ==
Mayor	Term Began	Term Ended
Christine Galvani	2008	
Jacques Verdanne	1995	2008
Fernand Pauly	1971	1995
François Maurel	1964	1971
Albert Barès	1953	1964
François Maurel	1947	1953
Antoine Milhès	1934	1946
Pierre Milhès	1919	1933
Marcel-Auguste Dieulafoy	1900	1919
Antoine Milhès	1888	1900
Bernard Maurel	1887	1888
Albert de Cavailhès	1885	1887
Jules Castagné	1884	1885
Antoine Courrège	1878	1884
Mathieu Clavié	1874	1878
Antoine Courrège	1868	1874
Bernard Maurel	1867	1868
Louis Castagné	1855	1867
Jean Bac	1837	1855
Louis Cazac	1832	1837
Joseph Henry	1832	1832
Emmanuel Guyon	1828	1832
Antoine Jouve	1815	1828
François Feillou	1815	1815
Jean-François Villagre	1807	1815
Jean Sarda	1804	1807
Germain Laujoulet	1796	1814
Felix Verdun	1892	1896

== Sights ==
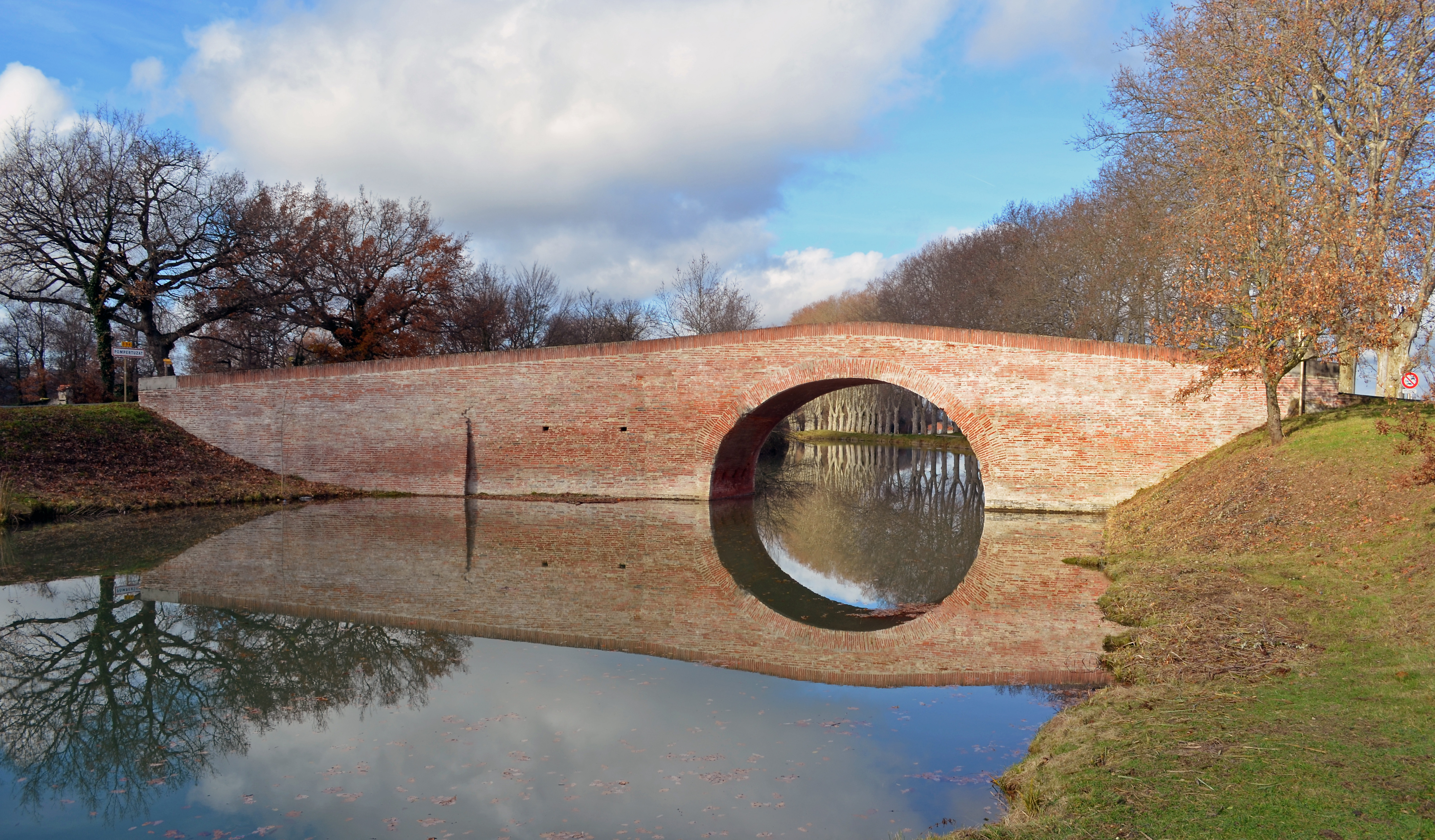
Bridge of Deyme

- Church of the 16th century
- Dovecote of the 18th century
- Bridge of the 17th century on the Canal du Midi (called "bridge of Deyme", "Pont de Deyme" in French). This bridge, built of red brick in the development of the Canal du Midi, 12 April 1814, destroyed by the troops of Marshal Soult at retirement before they make the Anglo-Spanish in Wellington, after the indecisive battle of Toulouse the day before. The bridge was then rebuilt in 1821. This bridge with barrel vault typical of the late seventeenth century is included in the inventory of historical monuments.

== People ==
- Jane Dieulafoy (née Magre, born 29 June 1851, died 25 May 1916) in particular, brought with her husband Marcel Dieulafoy several Persian friezes that are exhibited at the Louvre (frieze of Lions and frieze of archers in particular), and produces a literary consistent, inspired by the many trips she made with her husband.
- Marcel-Auguste Dieulafoy himself, an archaeologist, husband of the former, who was also mayor of the village.

== See also ==
- Communes of the Haute-Garonne department
