= Ayguesvives =

- Commune
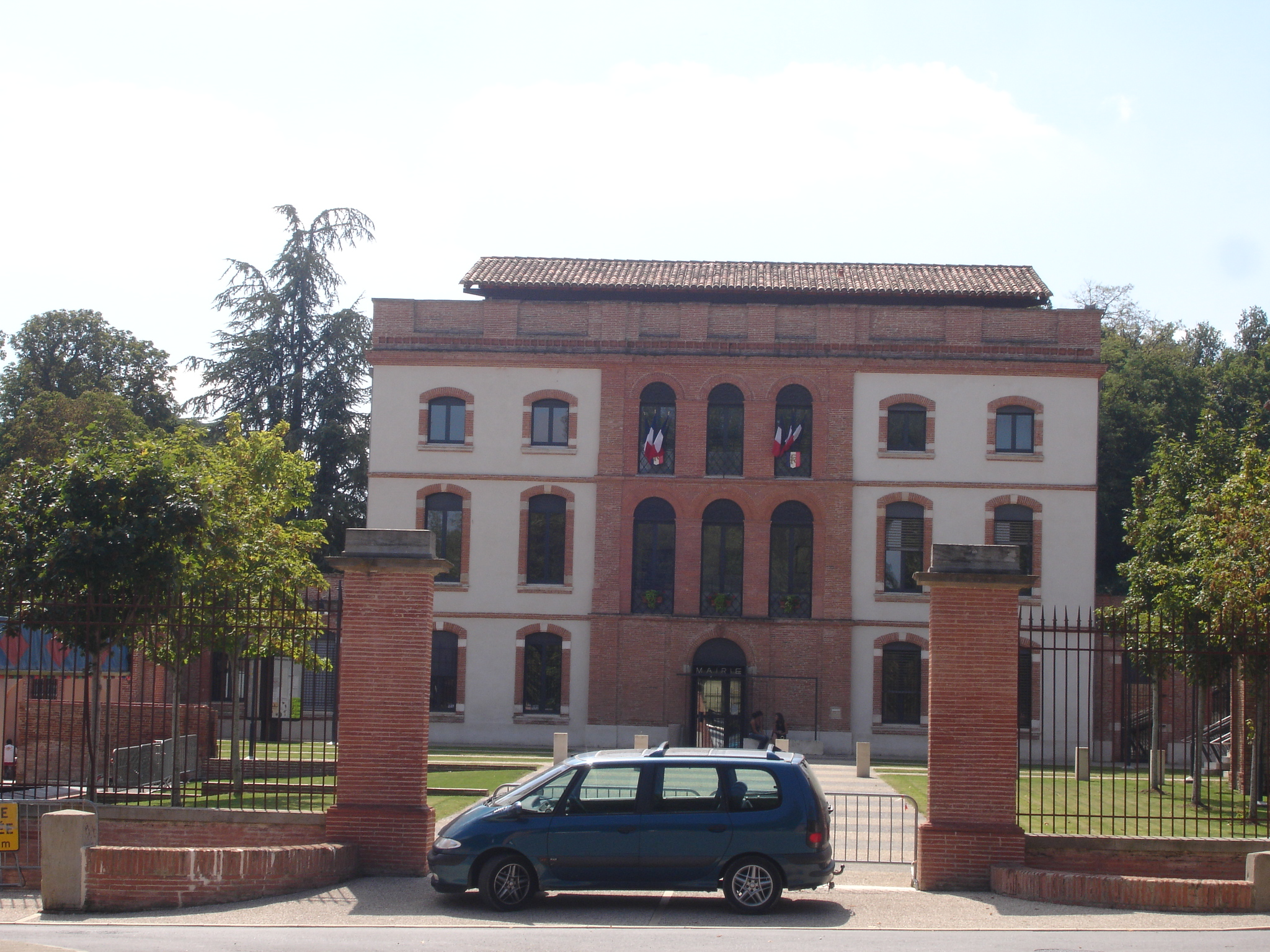
- Town hall

- Coat of arms
- Location of Ayguesvives
- Location within France Location within Occitanie
- Coordinates: 43°26′18″N 1°35′52″E
- Country: France
- Region: Occitania
- Department: Haute-Garonne
- Arrondissement: Toulouse
- Canton: Escalquens
- Intercommunality: CA Sicoval

Government
  - Mayor (2024–2026): Alain Maurel
- Area^{1}: 13.11 km^{2} (5.06 sq mi)
- Elevation: 172 m (564 ft)
- Highest elevation: 271 m (889 ft)
- Lowest elevation: 156 m (512 ft)
- Population (2023): 2,812
  - Density: 214.5/km^{2} (555.5/sq mi)
- Time zone: UTC+01:00 (CET)
  - Summer (DST): UTC+02:00 (CEST)
- INSEE/Postal code: 31004 /31450
- ^{1} French Land Register data, which excludes lakes, ponds, glaciers > 1 km^{2} (0.386 sq mi or 247 acres) and river estuaries.

Ayguesvives (French pronunciation: [ɛjɡəviv]; Occitan: Aigas Vivas) is a commune in the Haute-Garonne department in southwestern France.

== Population ==
Historical population

Year	Pop.	±% p.a.
1793	630	—
1800	810	+3.66%
1806	653	−3.53%
1821	740	+0.84%
1831	762	+0.29%
1836	723	−1.05%
1841	736	+0.36%
1846	761	+0.67%
1851	774	+0.34%
1856	756	−0.47%
1861	701	−1.50%
1866	680	−0.61%
1872	657	−0.57%
1876	619	−1.48%
1881	590	−0.96%
1886	597	+0.24%
1891	579	−0.61%
1896	548	−1.09%
1901	527	−0.78%

Year	Pop.	±% p.a.
1906	503	−0.93%
1911	508	+0.20%
1921	437	−1.49%
1926	435	−0.09%
1931	429	−0.28%
1936	369	−2.97%
1946	427	+1.47%
1954	496	+1.89%
1962	515	+0.47%
1968	876	+9.26%
1975	1,218	+4.82%
1982	1,261	+0.50%
1990	1,523	+2.39%
1999	1,815	+1.97%
2007	2,186	+2.35%
2012	2,440	+2.22%
2017	2,655	+1.70%
2023	2,812	+0.96%

Source: EHESS and INSEE (1968-2023)

== See also ==
- Communes of the Haute-Garonne department
