= Deyme =

- Commune
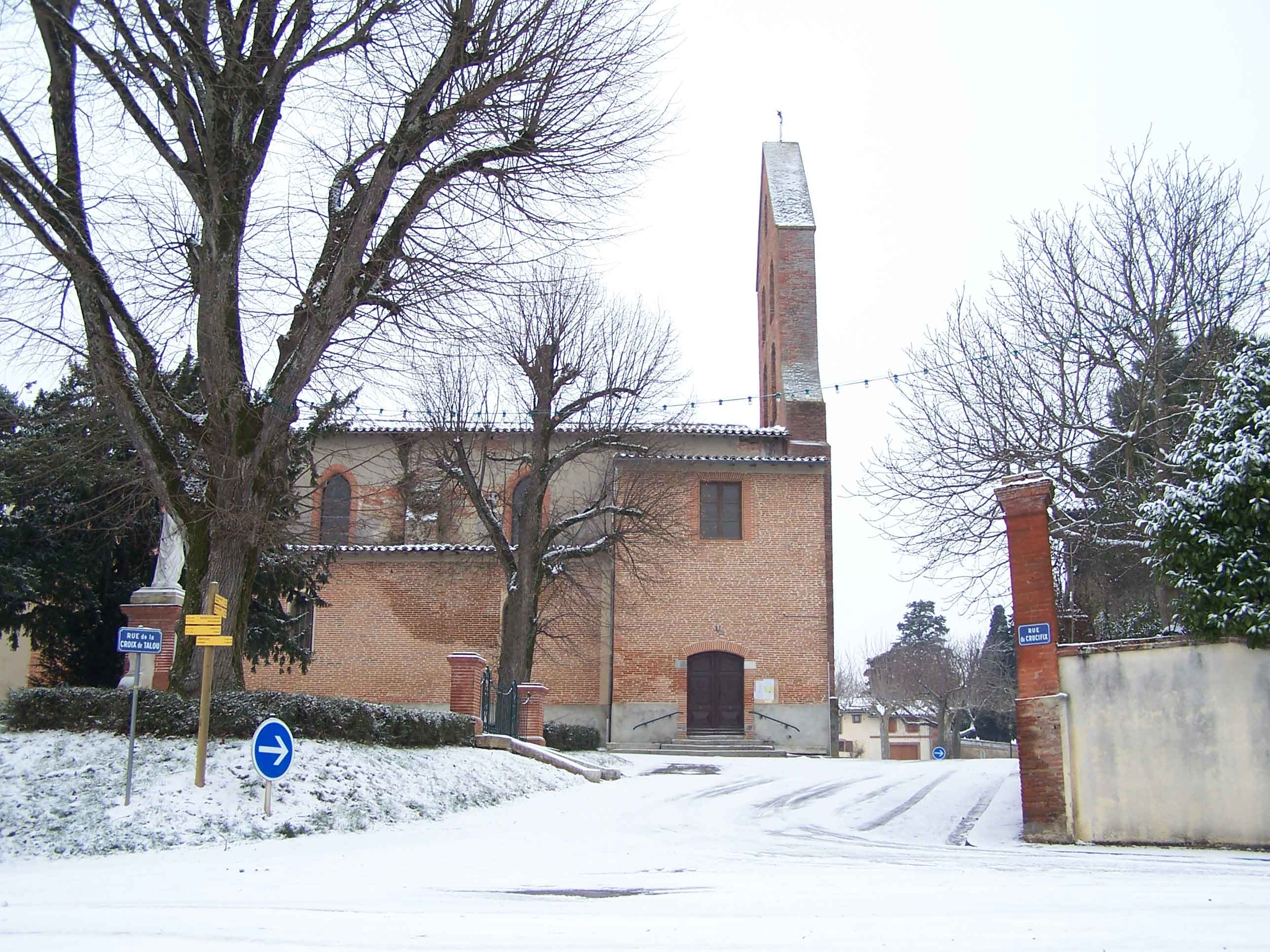
- The church in Deyme
- Location of Deyme
- Location within France Location within Occitanie
- Coordinates: 43°28′49″N 1°31′40″E
- Country: France
- Region: Occitania
- Department: Haute-Garonne
- Arrondissement: Toulouse
- Canton: Escalquens
- Intercommunality: CA Sicoval

Government
  - Mayor (2020–2026): Eric Borra
- Area^{1}: 7.05 km^{2} (2.72 sq mi)
- Elevation: 226 m (741 ft)
- Highest elevation: 275 m (902 ft)
- Lowest elevation: 148 m (486 ft)
- Population (2023): 1,468
  - Density: 208/km^{2} (539/sq mi)
- Time zone: UTC+01:00 (CET)
  - Summer (DST): UTC+02:00 (CEST)
- INSEE/Postal code: 31161 /31450
- ^{1} French Land Register data, which excludes lakes, ponds, glaciers > 1 km^{2} (0.386 sq mi or 247 acres) and river estuaries.

Deyme (French pronunciation: [dɛm]; Occitan: Dèime) is a commune in the Haute-Garonne department in southwestern France.

== Population ==
Historical population
Year	Pop.	±% p.a.
1968	193	—
1975	260	+4.35%
1982	430	+7.45%
1990	652	+5.34%
1999	835	+2.79%
2007	874	+0.57%
2012	860	−0.32%
2017	1,192	+6.75%
2023	1,468	+3.53%
Source: INSEE

== See also ==
- Communes of the Haute-Garonne department
