= Belbèze-de-Lauragais =

- Commune
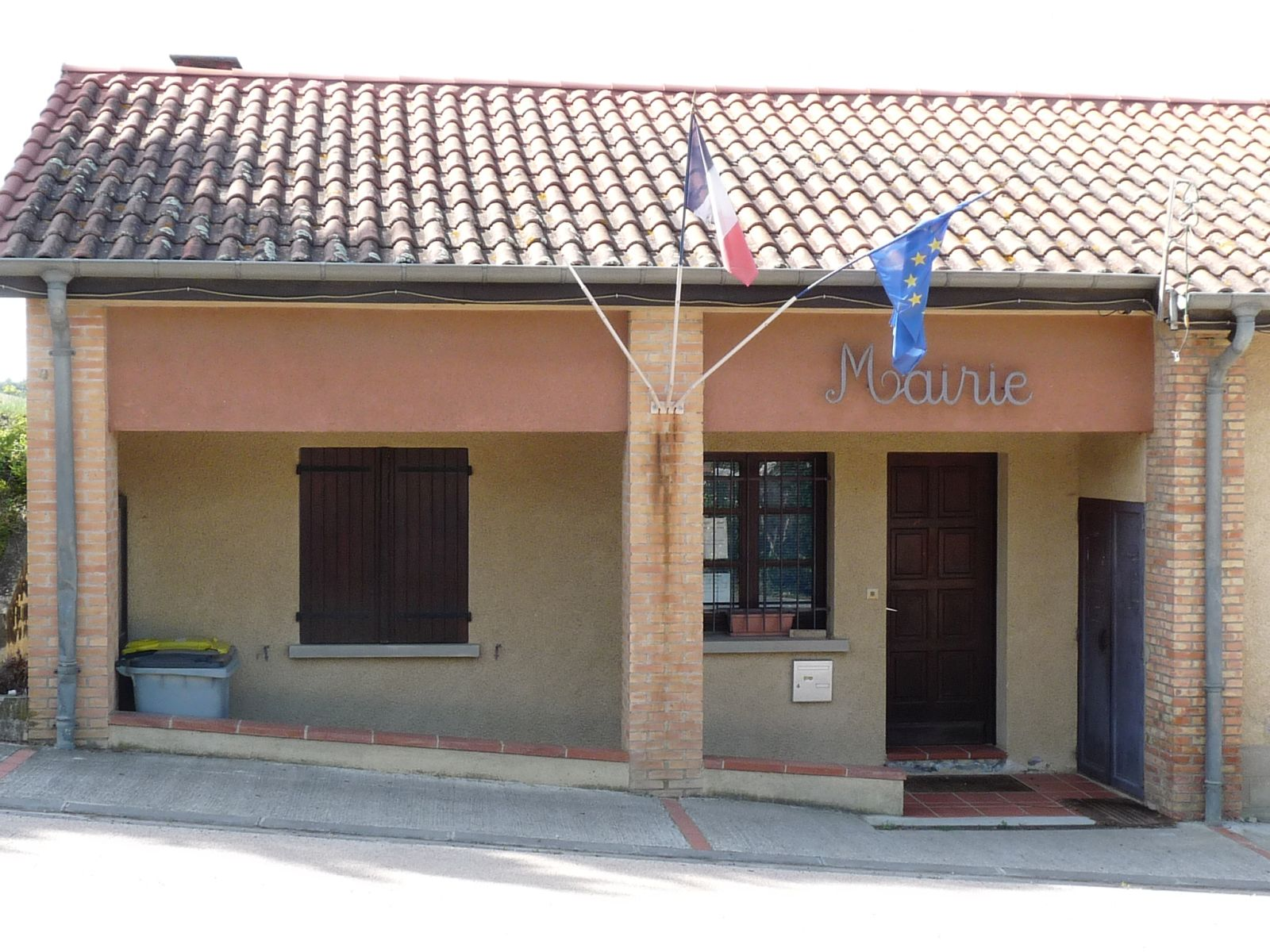
- The town hall in Belbèze-de-Lauragais

- Coat of arms
- Location of Belbèze-de-Lauragais
- Location within France Location within Occitanie
- Coordinates: 43°26′31″N 1°33′25″E
- Country: France
- Region: Occitania
- Department: Haute-Garonne
- Arrondissement: Toulouse
- Canton: Escalquens
- Intercommunality: CA Sicoval

Government
  - Mayor (2020–2026): Catherine Gaven
- Area^{1}: 3.71 km^{2} (1.43 sq mi)
- Elevation: 220 m (720 ft)
- Highest elevation: 275 m (902 ft)
- Lowest elevation: 190 m (620 ft)
- Population (2023): 125
  - Density: 33.7/km^{2} (87.3/sq mi)
- Time zone: UTC+01:00 (CET)
  - Summer (DST): UTC+02:00 (CEST)
- INSEE/Postal code: 31058 /31450
- ^{1} French Land Register data, which excludes lakes, ponds, glaciers > 1 km^{2} (0.386 sq mi or 247 acres) and river estuaries.

Belbèze-de-Lauragais (French pronunciation: [bɛlbɛz də loʁaɡɛ]; Occitan: Bèlvéser de Lauragués) is a commune in the Haute-Garonne department in southwestern France.

== Population ==
Historical population
Year	Pop.	±% p.a.
1968	47	—
1975	40	−2.28%
1982	59	+5.71%
1990	60	+0.21%
1999	101	+5.96%
2007	95	−0.76%
2012	104	+1.83%
2017	123	+3.41%
2023	125	+0.27%
Source: INSEE

== See also ==
- Communes of the Haute-Garonne department
