= Seyre =

- Commune
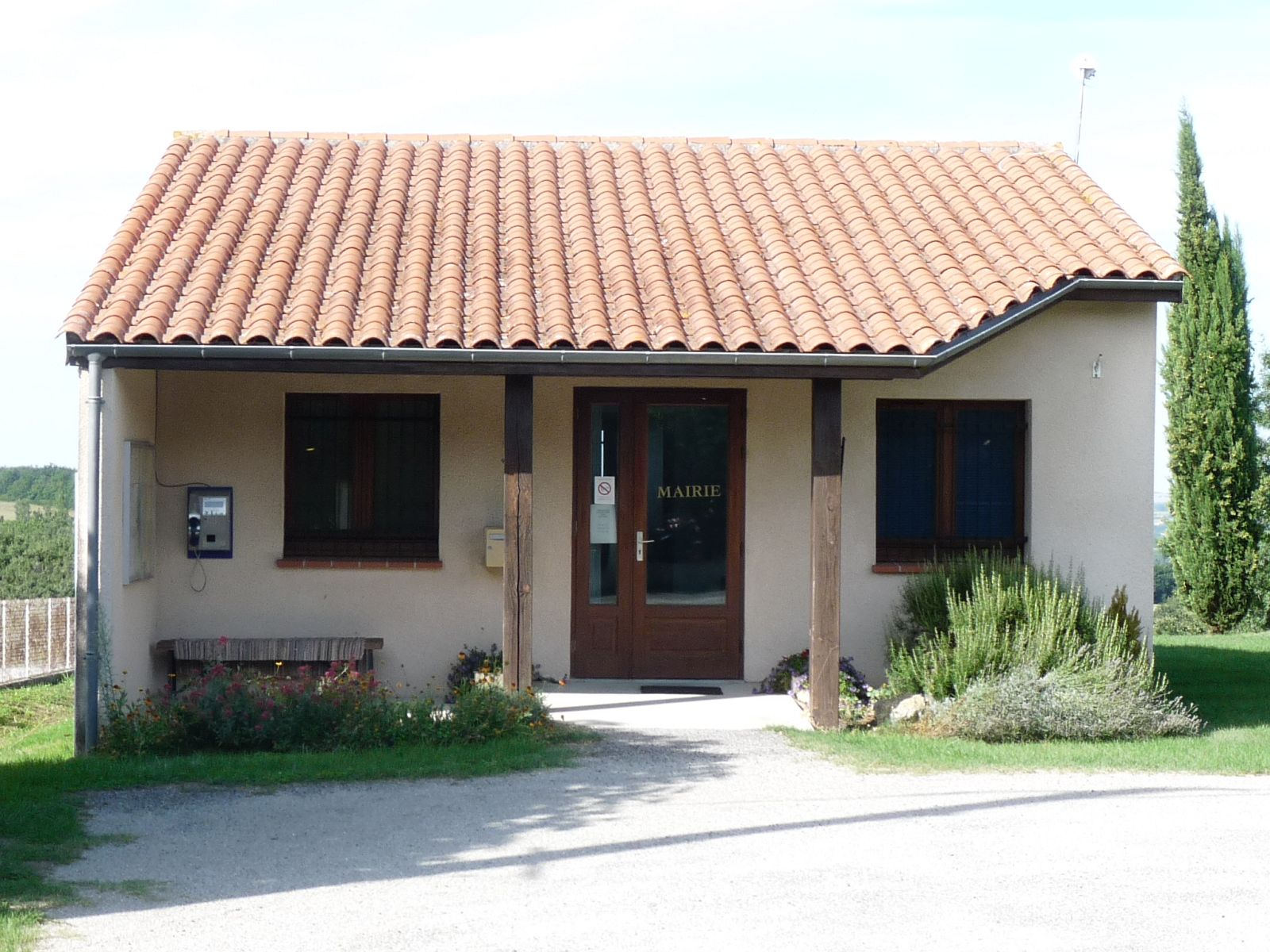
- The town hall in Seyre
- Location of Seyre
- Location within France Location within Occitanie
- Coordinates: 43°21′51″N 1°40′12″E
- Country: France
- Region: Occitania
- Department: Haute-Garonne
- Arrondissement: Toulouse
- Canton: Escalquens

Government
  - Mayor (2020–2026): Michel Touja
- Area^{1}: 3.89 km^{2} (1.50 sq mi)
- Elevation: 250 m (820 ft)
- Highest elevation: 262 m (860 ft)
- Lowest elevation: 185 m (607 ft)
- Population (2023): 129
  - Density: 33.2/km^{2} (85.9/sq mi)
- Time zone: UTC+01:00 (CET)
  - Summer (DST): UTC+02:00 (CEST)
- INSEE/Postal code: 31546 /31560
- ^{1} French Land Register data, which excludes lakes, ponds, glaciers > 1 km^{2} (0.386 sq mi or 247 acres) and river estuaries.

Seyre is a commune in the Haute-Garonne department in southwestern France.

== Population ==
Historical population
Year	Pop.	±% p.a.
1968	76	—
1975	77	+0.19%
1982	82	+0.90%
1990	79	−0.46%
1999	76	−0.43%
2007	96	+2.96%
2012	97	+0.21%
2017	133	+6.52%
2023	129	−0.51%
Source: INSEE

== See also ==
- Communes of the Haute-Garonne department
