= Odars =

- Commune
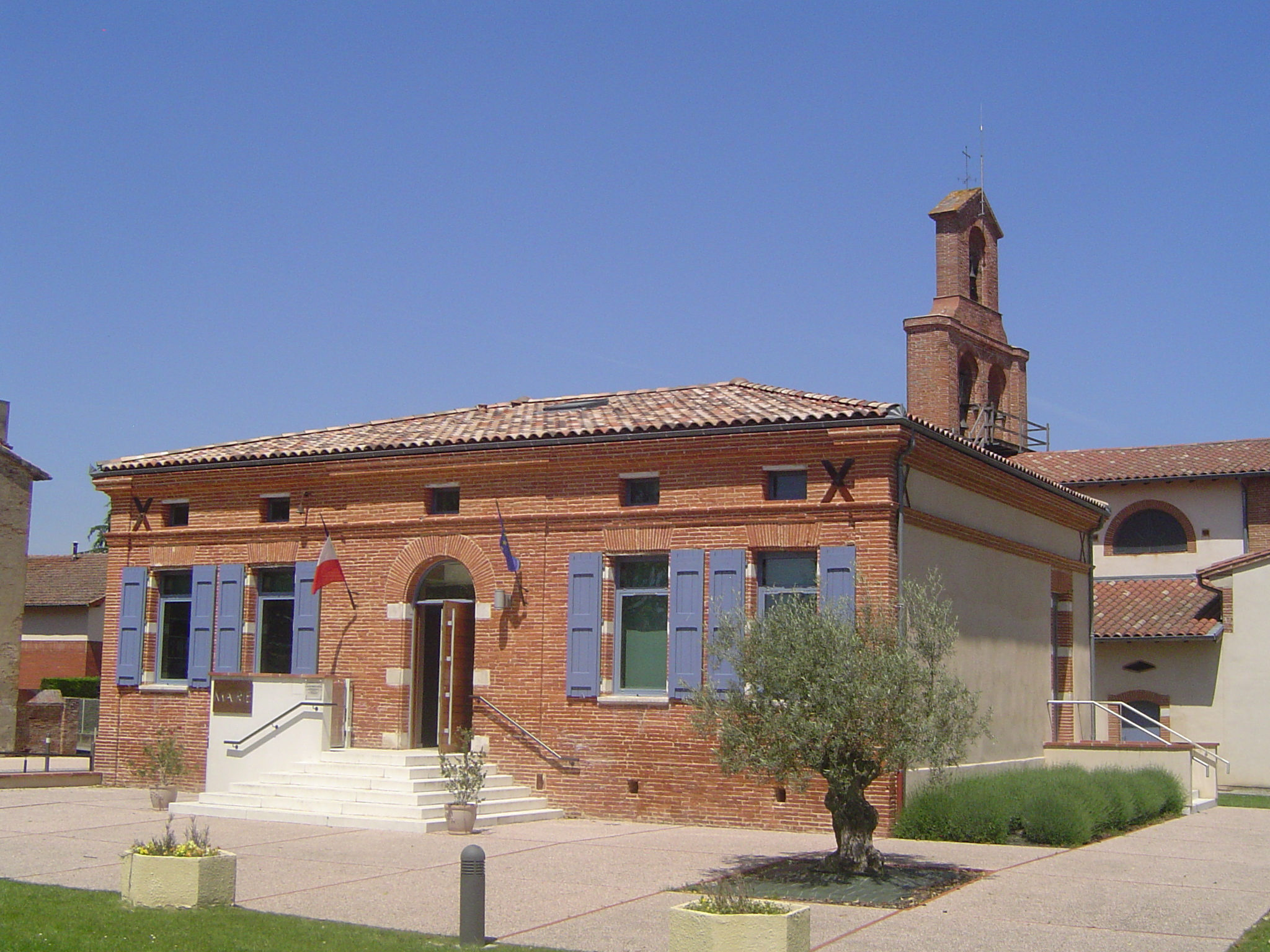
- Town Hall and church in the background

- Coat of arms
- Location of Odars
- Location within France Location within Occitanie
- Coordinates: 43°31′27″N 1°35′23″E
- Country: France
- Region: Occitania
- Department: Haute-Garonne
- Arrondissement: Toulouse
- Canton: Escalquens
- Intercommunality: CA Sicoval

Government
  - Mayor (2020–2026): Patrice Arséguel
- Area^{1}: 6.65 km^{2} (2.57 sq mi)
- Elevation: 233 m (764 ft)
- Highest elevation: 243 m (797 ft)
- Lowest elevation: 158 m (518 ft)
- Population (2023): 916
  - Density: 138/km^{2} (357/sq mi)
- Time zone: UTC+01:00 (CET)
  - Summer (DST): UTC+02:00 (CEST)
- INSEE/Postal code: 31402 /31450
- ^{1} French Land Register data, which excludes lakes, ponds, glaciers > 1 km^{2} (0.386 sq mi or 247 acres) and river estuaries.

Odars is a commune in the Haute-Garonne department in southwestern France.

== Population ==
Historical population
Year	Pop.	±% p.a.
1968	244	—
1975	298	+2.90%
1982	416	+4.88%
1990	527	+3.00%
1999	583	+1.13%
2007	684	+2.02%
2012	760	+2.13%
2017	872	+2.79%
2023	916	+0.82%
Source: INSEE

== See also ==
- Communes of the Haute-Garonne department
