= Varennes, Haute-Garonne =

Varennes
- Commune
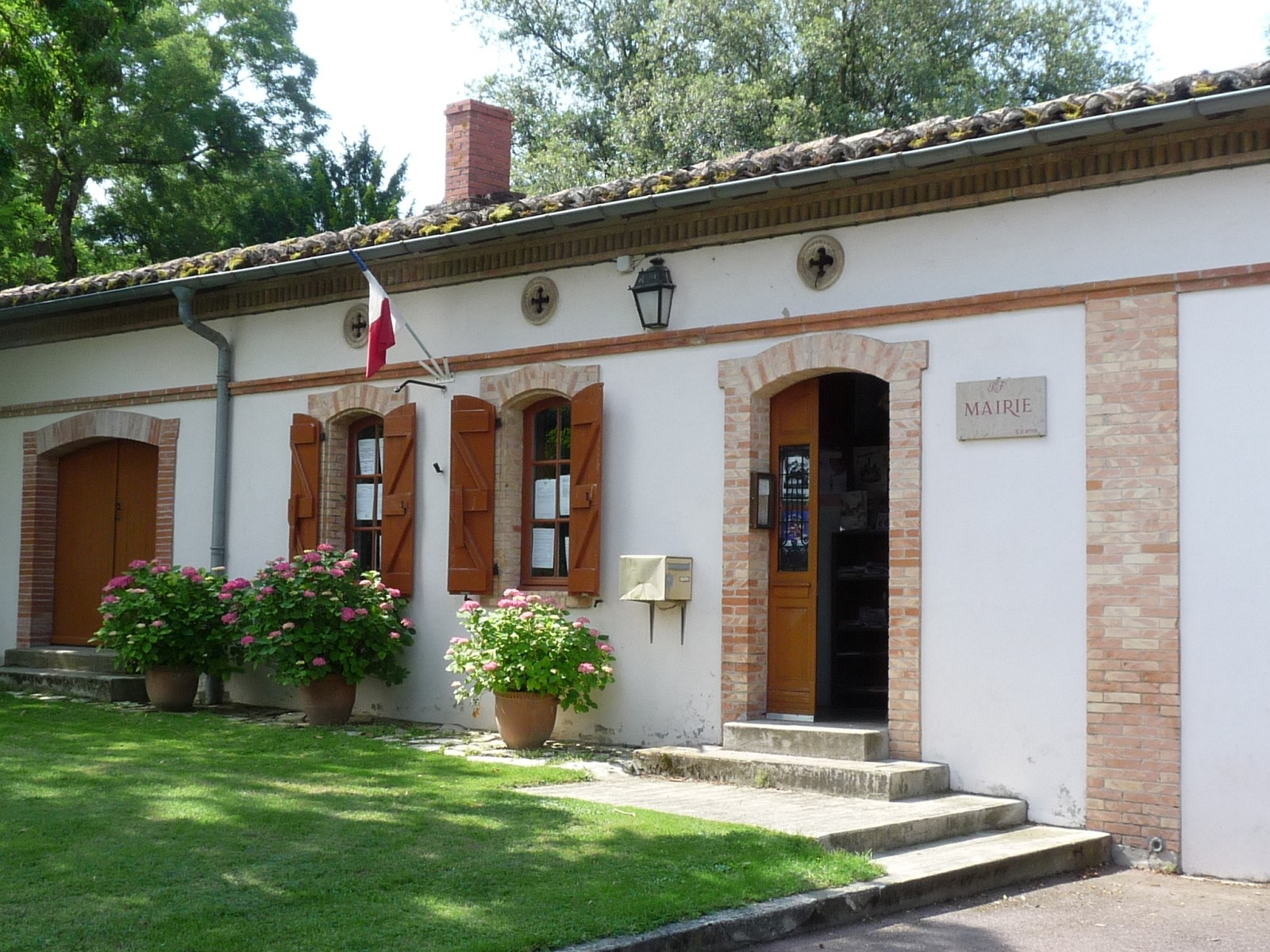
- The town hall in Varennes

- Coat of arms
- Location of Varennes
- Location within France Location within Occitanie
- Coordinates: 43°28′41″N 1°41′20″E
- Country: France
- Region: Occitania
- Department: Haute-Garonne
- Arrondissement: Toulouse
- Canton: Escalquens
- Intercommunality: CA Sicoval

Government
  - Mayor (2020–2026): Philippe Goux
- Area^{1}: 4.61 km^{2} (1.78 sq mi)
- Highest elevation: 273 m (896 ft)
- Lowest elevation: 196 m (643 ft)
- Population (2023): 255
  - Density: 55.3/km^{2} (143/sq mi)
- Time zone: UTC+01:00 (CET)
  - Summer (DST): UTC+02:00 (CEST)
- INSEE/Postal code: 31568 /31450
- ^{1} French Land Register data, which excludes lakes, ponds, glaciers > 1 km^{2} (0.386 sq mi or 247 acres) and river estuaries.

Varennes (French pronunciation: [vaʁɛn]; Occitan: Las Varenas) is a commune in the Haute-Garonne department in southwestern France.

== Population ==
Historical population
Year	Pop.	±% p.a.
1968	93	—
1975	117	+3.33%
1982	125	+0.95%
1990	156	+2.81%
1999	198	+2.68%
2007	250	+2.96%
2012	258	+0.63%
2017	271	+0.99%
2023	255	−1.01%
Source: INSEE

== See also ==
- Communes of the Haute-Garonne department
