= Corronsac =

- Commune
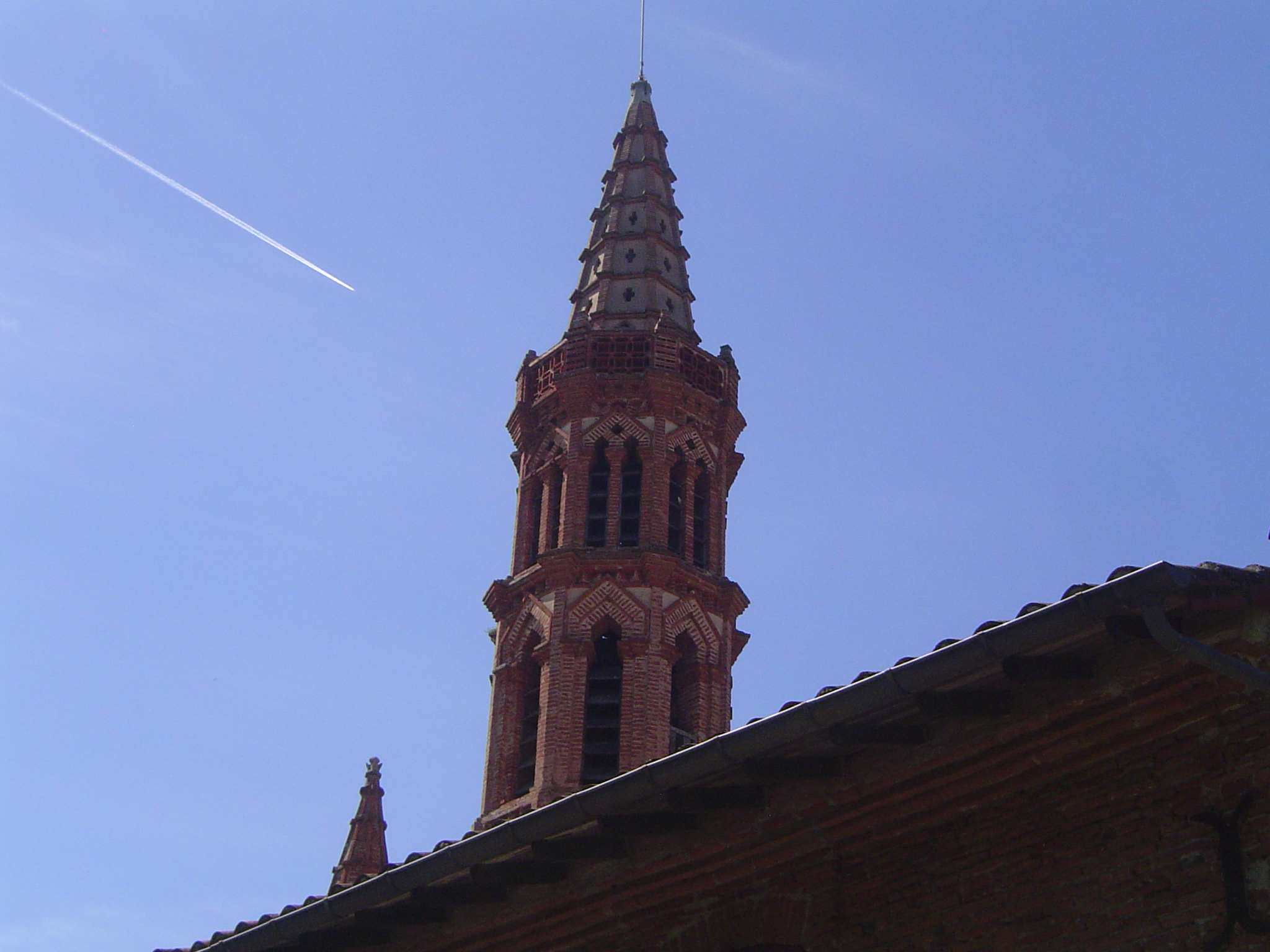
- The bell tower in Corronsac

- Coat of arms
- Location of Corronsac
- Location within France Location within Occitanie
- Coordinates: 43°28′27″N 1°29′56″E
- Country: France
- Region: Occitania
- Department: Haute-Garonne
- Arrondissement: Toulouse
- Canton: Escalquens
- Intercommunality: CA Sicoval

Government
  - Mayor (2020–2026): Thierry Ouplomb
- Area^{1}: 6.34 km^{2} (2.45 sq mi)
- Elevation: 280 m (920 ft)
- Highest elevation: 281 m (922 ft)
- Lowest elevation: 186 m (610 ft)
- Population (2023): 901
  - Density: 142/km^{2} (368/sq mi)
- Time zone: UTC+01:00 (CET)
  - Summer (DST): UTC+02:00 (CEST)
- INSEE/Postal code: 31151 /31450
- ^{1} French Land Register data, which excludes lakes, ponds, glaciers > 1 km^{2} (0.386 sq mi or 247 acres) and river estuaries.

Corronsac (French pronunciation: [kɔʁɔ̃sak]) is a commune in the Haute-Garonne department in southwestern France.

== Population ==
Historical population
Year	Pop.	±% p.a.
1968	140	—
1975	207	+5.75%
1982	335	+7.12%
1990	412	+2.62%
1999	448	+0.94%
2007	662	+5.00%
2012	738	+2.20%
2017	813	+1.95%
2023	901	+1.73%
Source: INSEE

== See also ==
- Communes of the Haute-Garonne department
