= Belberaud =

- Commune
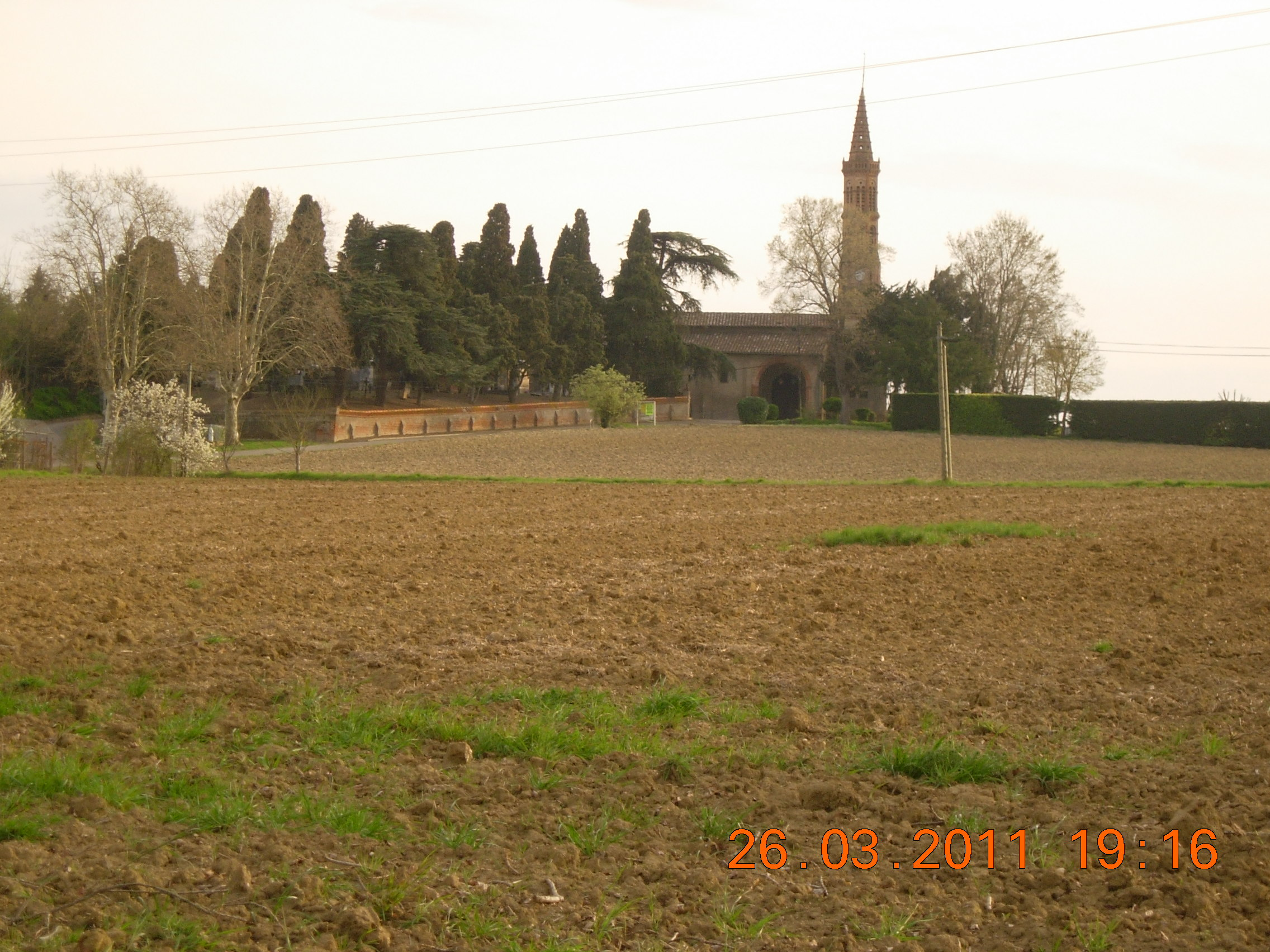
- The church in Belberaud

- Coat of arms
- Location of Belberaud
- Location within France Location within Occitanie
- Coordinates: 43°30′31″N 1°34′12″E
- Country: France
- Region: Occitania
- Department: Haute-Garonne
- Arrondissement: Toulouse
- Canton: Escalquens
- Intercommunality: CA Sicoval

Government
  - Mayor (2020–2026): Rafael Sorroche
- Area^{1}: 7.47 km^{2} (2.88 sq mi)
- Elevation: 181 m (594 ft)
- Highest elevation: 243 m (797 ft)
- Lowest elevation: 148 m (486 ft)
- Population (2023): 1,597
  - Density: 214/km^{2} (554/sq mi)
- Time zone: UTC+01:00 (CET)
  - Summer (DST): UTC+02:00 (CEST)
- INSEE/Postal code: 31057 /31450
- ^{1} French Land Register data, which excludes lakes, ponds, glaciers > 1 km^{2} (0.386 sq mi or 247 acres) and river estuaries.

Belberaud (French pronunciation: [bɛlbeʁo]; also Belbéraud; Occitan: Bèlberaud) is a commune in the Haute-Garonne department in southwestern France.

== Population ==
Historical population
Year	Pop.	±% p.a.
1968	230	—
1975	377	+7.31%
1982	495	+3.97%
1990	612	+2.69%
1999	1,124	+6.99%
2007	1,284	+1.68%
2012	1,289	+0.08%
2017	1,503	+3.12%
2023	1,597	+1.02%
Source: INSEE

== See also ==
- Communes of the Haute-Garonne department
