= Issus, Haute-Garonne =

Issus
- Commune
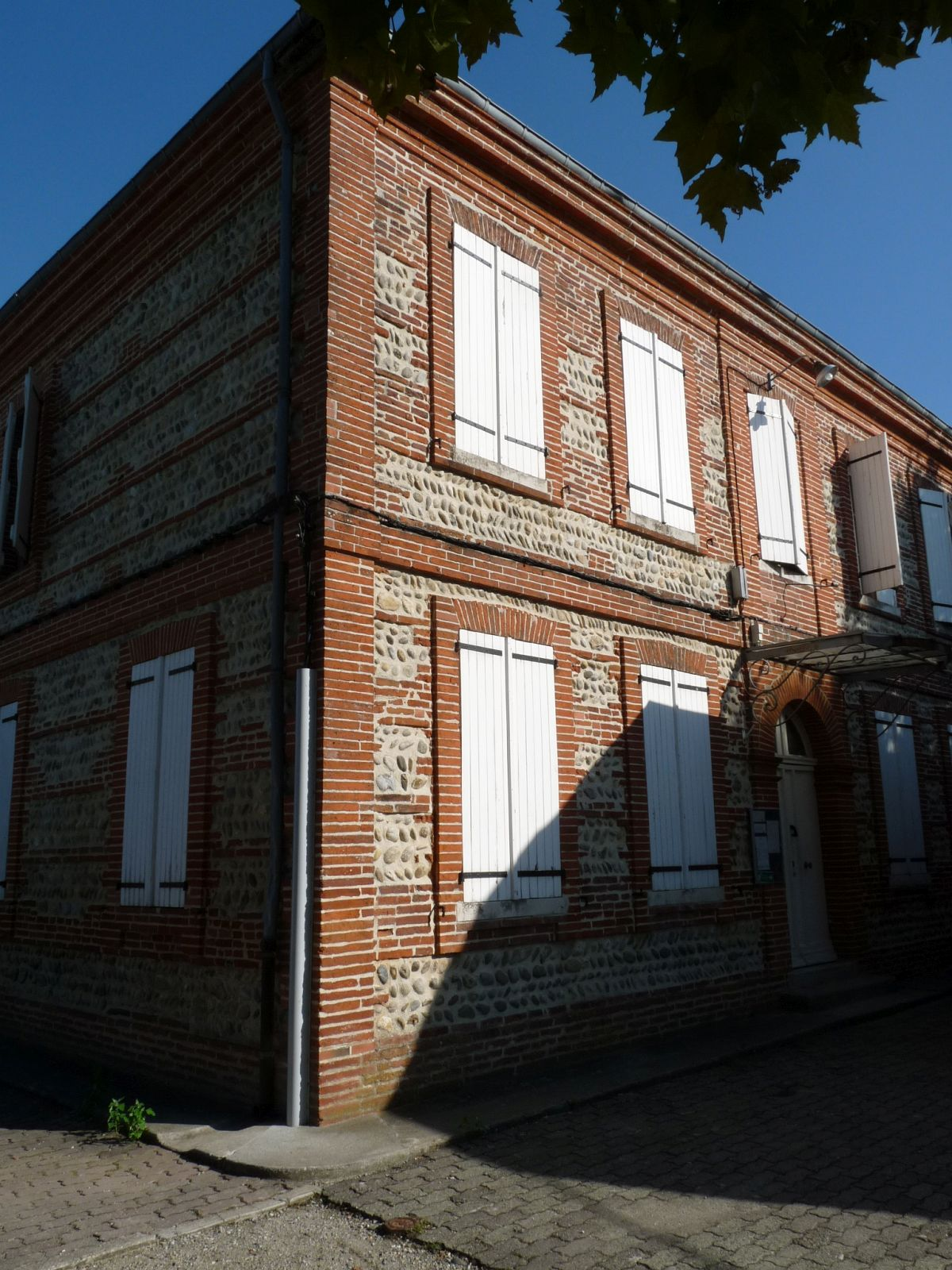
- The town hall in Issus

- Coat of arms
- Location of Issus
- Location within France Location within Occitanie
- Coordinates: 43°25′28″N 1°30′25″E
- Country: France
- Region: Occitania
- Department: Haute-Garonne
- Arrondissement: Toulouse
- Canton: Escalquens
- Intercommunality: CA Sicoval

Government
  - Mayor (2020–2026): Bruno Caubet
- Area^{1}: 7.11 km^{2} (2.75 sq mi)
- Elevation: 220 m (720 ft)
- Highest elevation: 247 m (810 ft)
- Lowest elevation: 178 m (584 ft)
- Population (2023): 655
  - Density: 92.1/km^{2} (239/sq mi)
- Time zone: UTC+01:00 (CET)
  - Summer (DST): UTC+02:00 (CEST)
- INSEE/Postal code: 31240 /31450
- ^{1} French Land Register data, which excludes lakes, ponds, glaciers > 1 km^{2} (0.386 sq mi or 247 acres) and river estuaries.

Issus is a commune in the Haute-Garonne department in southwestern France.

== Population ==
Historical population
Year	Pop.	±% p.a.
1968	198	—
1975	172	−1.99%
1982	211	+2.96%
1990	247	+1.99%
1999	291	+1.84%
2007	374	+3.19%
2012	472	+4.76%
2017	595	+4.74%
2023	655	+1.61%
Source: INSEE

== See also ==
Communes of the Haute-Garonne department
