= Trébons-sur-la-Grasse =

- Commune
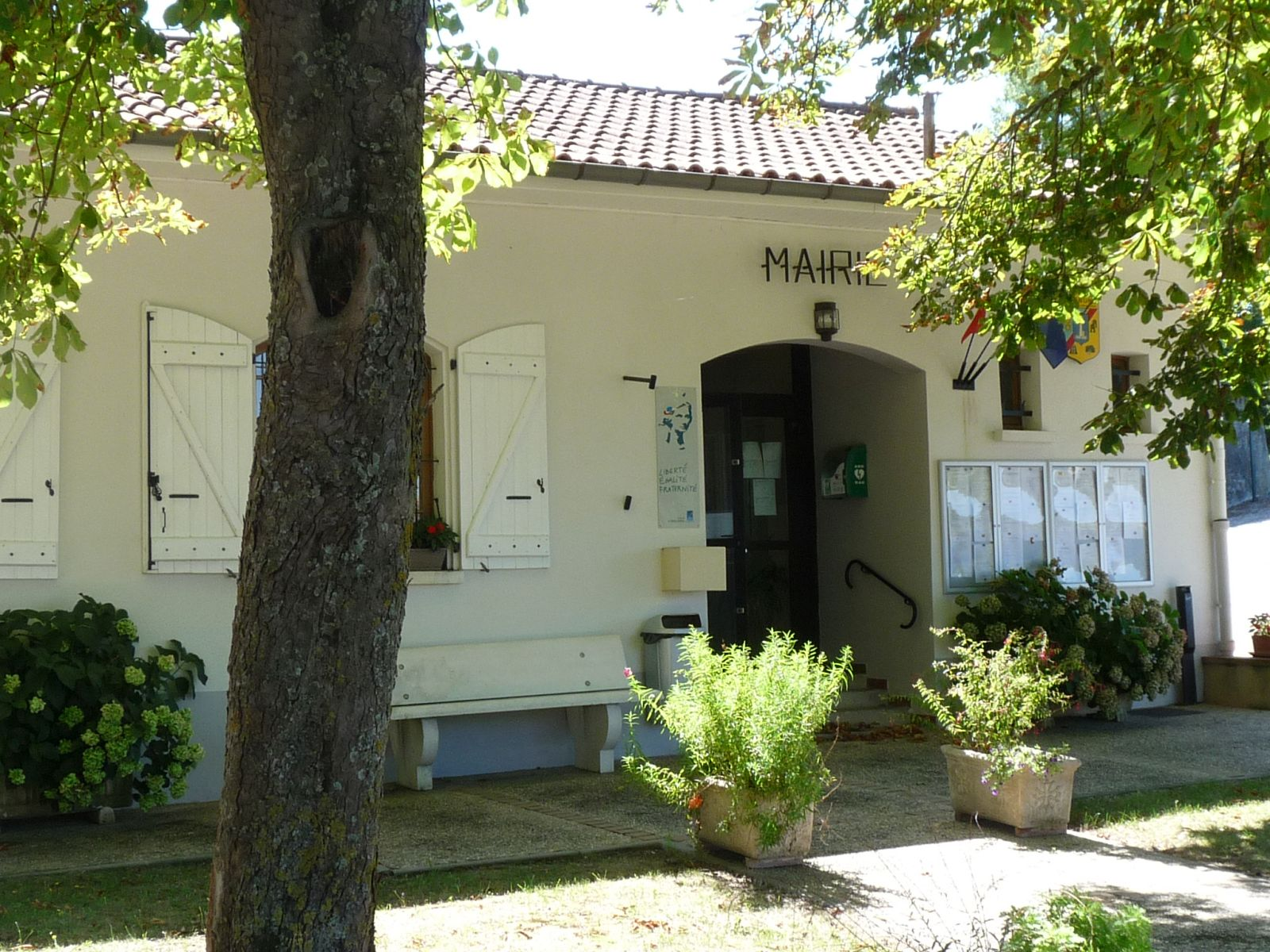
- The town hall in Trébons-sur-la-Grasse
- Location of Trébons-sur-la-Grasse
- Location within France Location within Occitanie
- Coordinates: 43°27′05″N 1°43′25″E
- Country: France
- Region: Occitania
- Department: Haute-Garonne
- Arrondissement: Toulouse
- Canton: Revel

Government
  - Mayor (2020–2026): John Steimer
- Area^{1}: 10.87 km^{2} (4.20 sq mi)
- Elevation: 180 m (590 ft)
- Highest elevation: 272 m (892 ft)
- Lowest elevation: 175 m (574 ft)
- Population (2023): 505
  - Density: 46.5/km^{2} (120/sq mi)
- Time zone: UTC+01:00 (CET)
  - Summer (DST): UTC+02:00 (CEST)
- INSEE/Postal code: 31560 /31290
- ^{1} French Land Register data, which excludes lakes, ponds, glaciers > 1 km^{2} (0.386 sq mi or 247 acres) and river estuaries.

Trébons-sur-la-Grasse is a commune in the Haute-Garonne department in southwestern France.

== Population ==
Historical population
Year	Pop.	±% p.a.
1968	181	—
1975	184	+0.24%
1982	204	+1.48%
1990	249	+2.52%
1999	322	+2.90%
2007	383	+2.19%
2012	442	+2.91%
2017	450	+0.36%
2023	505	+1.94%
Source: INSEE

== See also ==
- Communes of the Haute-Garonne department
