= Espanès =

- Commune
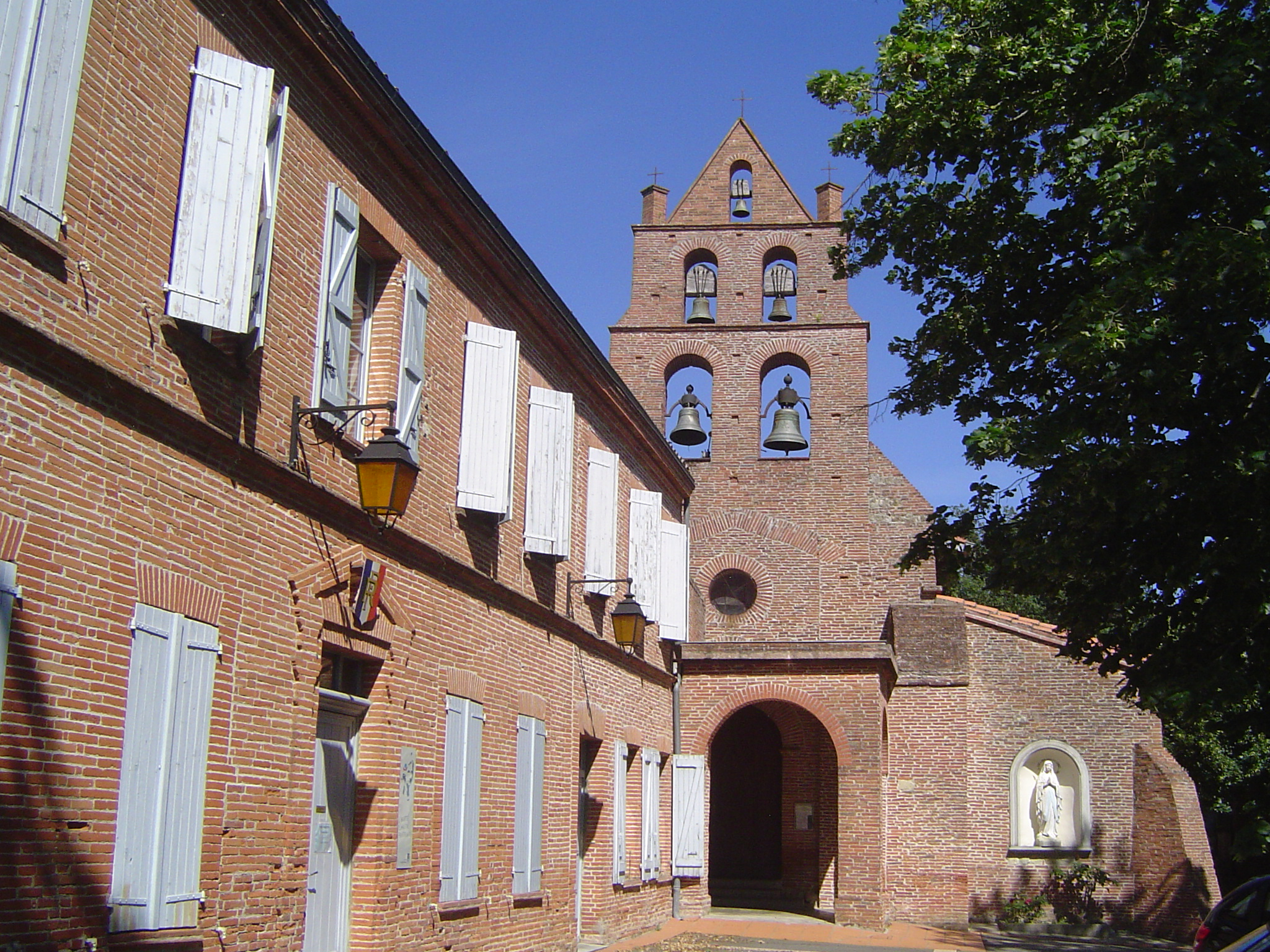
- Town hall and church

- Coat of arms
- Location of Espanès
- Location within France Location within Occitanie
- Coordinates: 43°27′14″N 1°29′21″E
- Country: France
- Region: Occitania
- Department: Haute-Garonne
- Arrondissement: Toulouse
- Canton: Escalquens
- Intercommunality: CA Sicoval

Government
  - Mayor (2020–2026): Christophe Gillon
- Area^{1}: 3.53 km^{2} (1.36 sq mi)
- Elevation: 278 m (912 ft)
- Highest elevation: 281 m (922 ft)
- Lowest elevation: 199 m (653 ft)
- Population (2023): 273
  - Density: 77.3/km^{2} (200/sq mi)
- Time zone: UTC+01:00 (CET)
  - Summer (DST): UTC+02:00 (CEST)
- INSEE/Postal code: 31171 /31450
- ^{1} French Land Register data, which excludes lakes, ponds, glaciers > 1 km^{2} (0.386 sq mi or 247 acres) and river estuaries.

Espanès (French pronunciation: [ɛspanɛs]; Occitan: Espanés) is a commune in the Haute-Garonne department in southwestern France.

== Population ==
Historical population
Year	Pop.	±% p.a.
1968	107	—
1975	143	+4.23%
1982	215	+6.00%
1990	214	−0.06%
1999	232	+0.90%
2007	270	+1.91%
2012	256	−1.06%
2017	325	+4.89%
2023	273	−2.86%
Source: INSEE

== See also ==
- Communes of the Haute-Garonne department
