= Lauzerville =

Commune in southwest France

- Commune
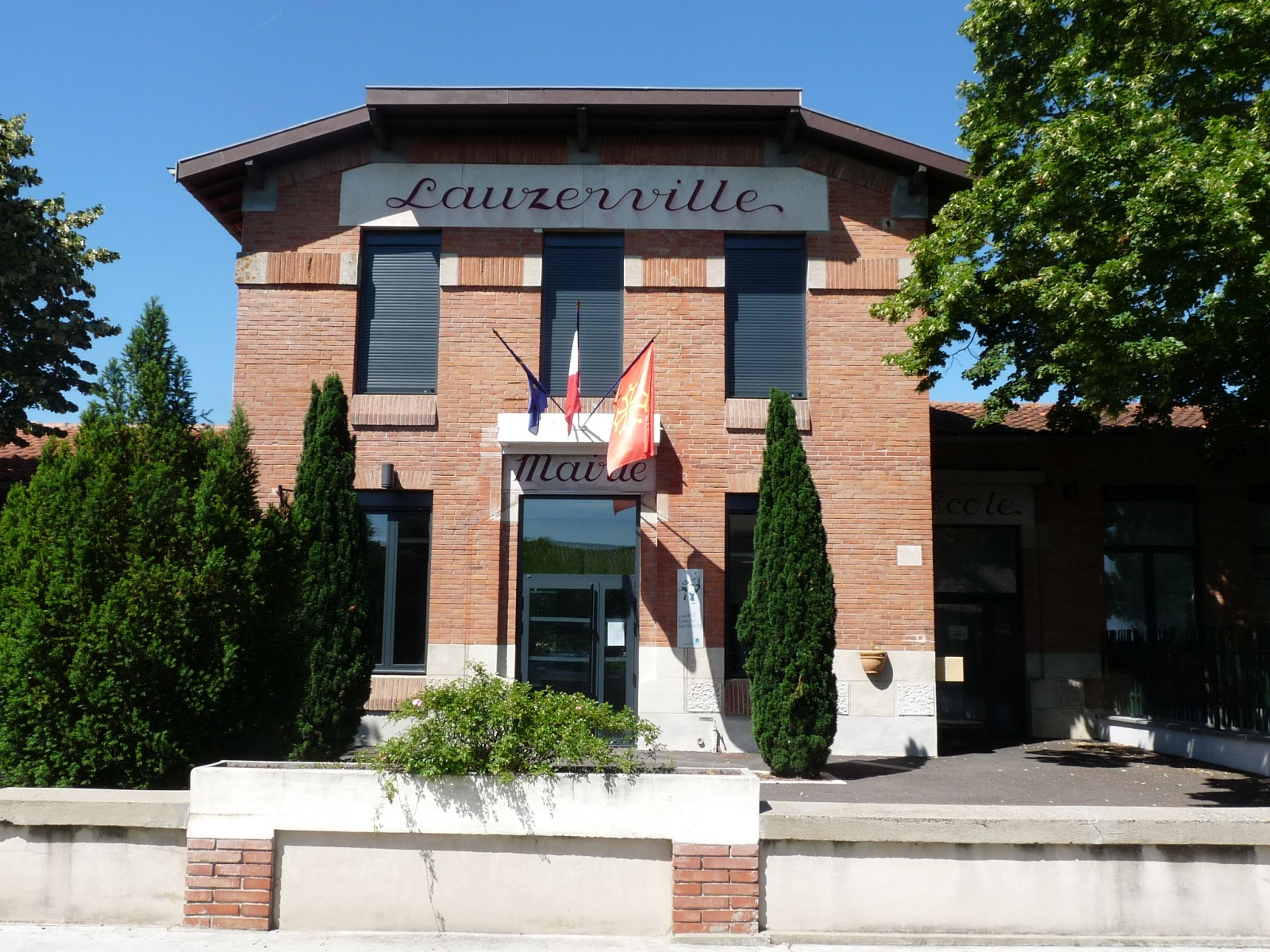
- The town hall in Lauzerville

- Coat of arms
- Location of Lauzerville
- Location within France Location within Occitanie
- Coordinates: 43°33′24″N 1°33′58″E
- Country: France
- Region: Occitania
- Department: Haute-Garonne
- Arrondissement: Toulouse
- Canton: Escalquens
- Intercommunality: CA Sicoval

Government
  - Mayor (2020–2026): Christelle Garcia
- Area^{1}: 3.46 km^{2} (1.34 sq mi)
- Elevation: 225 m (738 ft)
- Highest elevation: 225 m (738 ft)
- Lowest elevation: 149 m (489 ft)
- Population (2023): 1,582
  - Density: 457/km^{2} (1,180/sq mi)
- Time zone: UTC+01:00 (CET)
  - Summer (DST): UTC+02:00 (CEST)
- INSEE/Postal code: 31284 /31650
- ^{1} French Land Register data, which excludes lakes, ponds, glaciers > 1 km^{2} (0.386 sq mi or 247 acres) and river estuaries.

Lauzerville (French pronunciation: [lozɛʁvil]; Occitan: Lauservila) is a commune in the Haute-Garonne department in southwestern France. As of 2019, there are 590 dwellings in Lauzerville.

== Population ==
An outer suburb of Toulouse, its population has been growing rapidly since the 1980s.

Historical population
Year	Pop.	±% p.a.
1968	158	—
1975	219	+4.77%
1982	285	+3.83%
1990	405	+4.49%
1999	873	+8.91%
2007	1,103	+2.97%
2012	1,466	+5.86%
2017	1,588	+1.61%
2023	1,582	−0.06%
Source: INSEE

== See also ==
Communes of the Haute-Garonne department
