= Labastide-Beauvoir =

- Commune
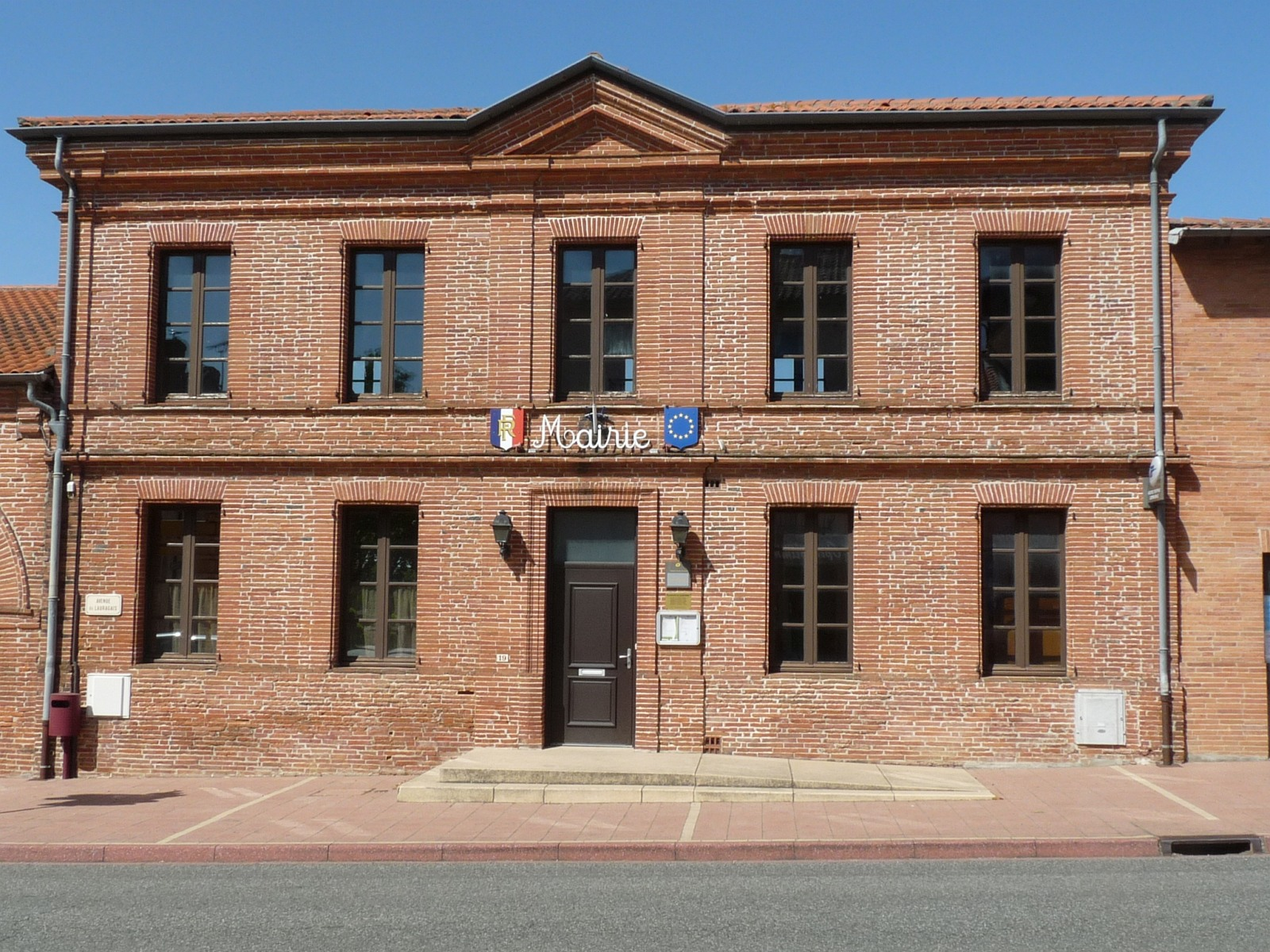
- The town hall in Labastide-Beauvoir

- Coat of arms
- Location of Labastide-Beauvoir
- Location within France Location within Occitanie
- Coordinates: 43°28′58″N 1°39′59″E
- Country: France
- Region: Occitania
- Department: Haute-Garonne
- Arrondissement: Toulouse
- Canton: Escalquens
- Intercommunality: CA Sicoval

Government
  - Mayor (2024–2026): Serge Pina
- Area^{1}: 10.2 km^{2} (3.9 sq mi)
- Elevation: 266 m (873 ft)
- Highest elevation: 264 m (866 ft)
- Lowest elevation: 179 m (587 ft)
- Population (2023): 1,254
  - Density: 123/km^{2} (318/sq mi)
- Time zone: UTC+01:00 (CET)
  - Summer (DST): UTC+02:00 (CEST)
- INSEE/Postal code: 31249 /31450
- ^{1} French Land Register data, which excludes lakes, ponds, glaciers > 1 km^{2} (0.386 sq mi or 247 acres) and river estuaries.

Labastide-Beauvoir (French pronunciation: [labastid bovwaʁ]; Occitan: La Bastida) is a commune in the Haute-Garonne department in southwestern France.

== Population ==
Historical population
Year	Pop.	±% p.a.
1968	483	—
1975	510	+0.78%
1982	536	+0.71%
1990	599	+1.40%
1999	664	+1.15%
2007	1,009	+5.37%
2012	1,128	+2.25%
2017	1,272	+2.43%
2023	1,254	−0.24%
Source: INSEE

== See also ==
Communes of the Haute-Garonne department
