= Fourquevaux =

- Commune
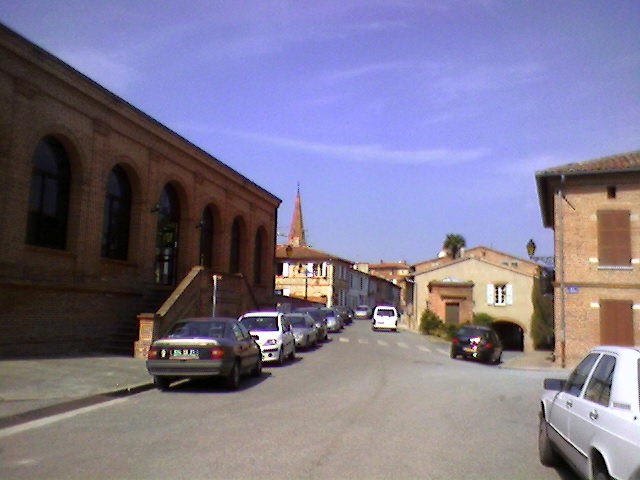
- A view within Fourquevaux

- Coat of arms
- Location of Fourquevaux
- Location within France Location within Occitanie
- Coordinates: 43°30′27″N 1°37′03″E
- Country: France
- Region: Occitania
- Department: Haute-Garonne
- Arrondissement: Toulouse
- Canton: Escalquens
- Intercommunality: CA Sicoval

Government
  - Mayor (2020–2026): Olivier Capelle
- Area^{1}: 10.03 km^{2} (3.87 sq mi)
- Elevation: 230 m (750 ft)
- Highest elevation: 256 m (840 ft)
- Lowest elevation: 165 m (541 ft)
- Population (2023): 851
  - Density: 84.8/km^{2} (220/sq mi)
- Time zone: UTC+01:00 (CET)
  - Summer (DST): UTC+02:00 (CEST)
- INSEE/Postal code: 31192 /31450
- ^{1} French Land Register data, which excludes lakes, ponds, glaciers > 1 km^{2} (0.386 sq mi or 247 acres) and river estuaries.

Fourquevaux (French pronunciation: [fuʁkəvo]; Occitan: Forcasvals) is a commune in the Haute-Garonne department in southwestern France.

== Population ==
Historical population
Year	Pop.	±% p.a.
1968	351	—
1975	460	+3.94%
1982	557	+2.77%
1990	639	+1.73%
1999	716	+1.27%
2007	765	+0.83%
2012	750	−0.40%
2017	771	+0.55%
2023	851	+1.66%
Source: INSEE

== Sights ==
The Château de Fourquevaux is a 15th- and 16th-century castle. With its 18th-century orangery, it has been listed since 1979 as a historic site by the French Ministry of Culture.

== See also ==
- Communes of the Haute-Garonne department
