= Sainte-Foy-d'Aigrefeuille =

- Commune
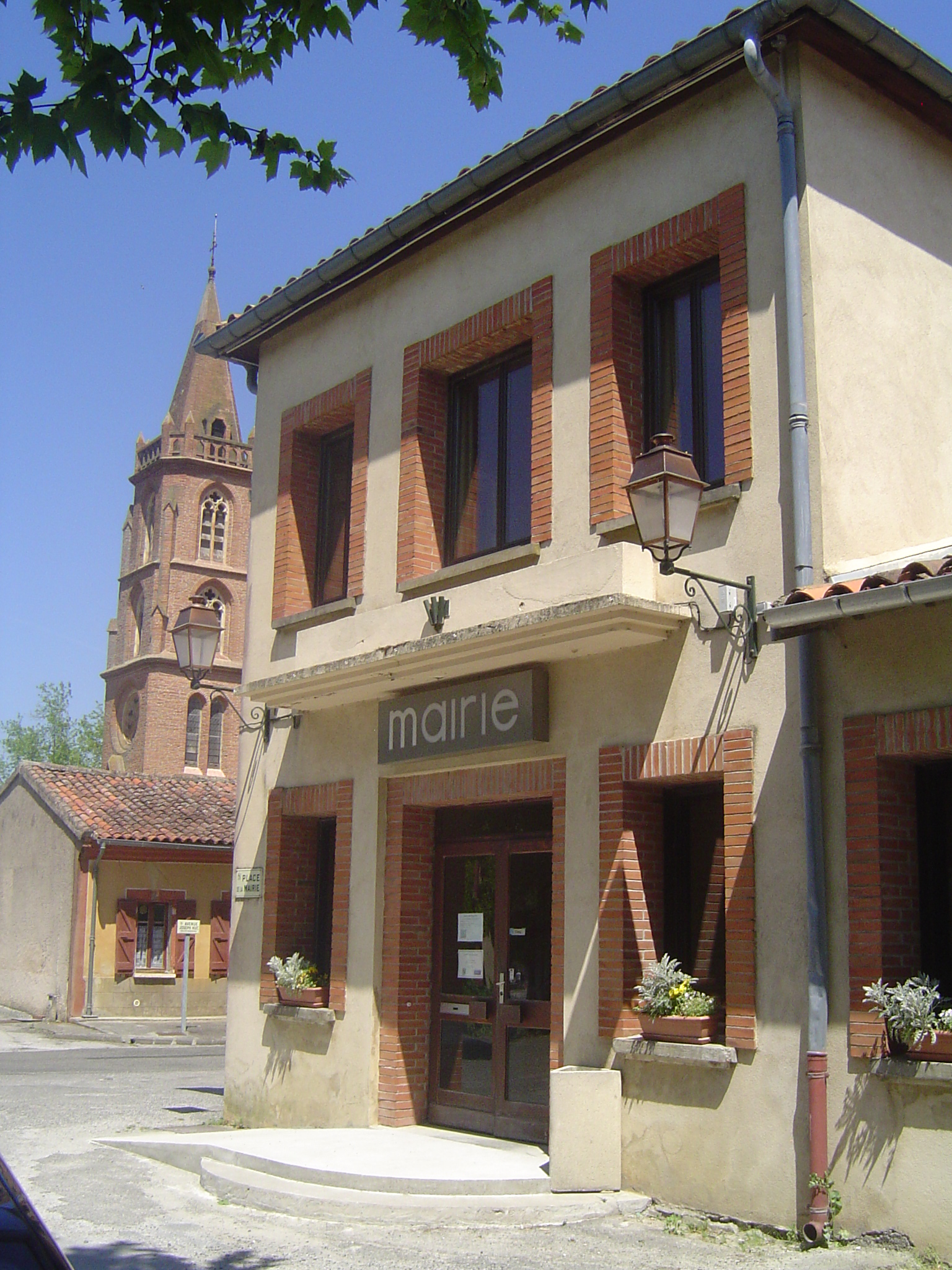
- The town hall in Sainte-Foy-d'Aigrefeuille

- Coat of arms
- Location of Sainte-Foy-d'Aigrefeuille
- Location within France Location within Occitanie
- Coordinates: 43°32′39″N 1°36′37″E
- Country: France
- Region: Occitania
- Department: Haute-Garonne
- Arrondissement: Toulouse
- Canton: Escalquens

Government
  - Mayor (2020–2026): Daniel Ruffat
- Area^{1}: 9.68 km^{2} (3.74 sq mi)
- Elevation: 165 m (541 ft)
- Highest elevation: 240 m (790 ft)
- Lowest elevation: 152 m (499 ft)
- Population (2023): 2,576
  - Density: 266/km^{2} (689/sq mi)
- Time zone: UTC+01:00 (CET)
  - Summer (DST): UTC+02:00 (CEST)
- INSEE/Postal code: 31480 /31570
- ^{1} French Land Register data, which excludes lakes, ponds, glaciers > 1 km^{2} (0.386 sq mi or 247 acres) and river estuaries.

Sainte-Foy-d'Aigrefeuille (French pronunciation: [sɛ̃t fwa dɛɡʁəfœj]; Occitan: Santa Fe de Grefuèlha) is a commune in the Haute-Garonne department in southwestern France.

== Population ==
Historical population
Year	Pop.	±% p.a.
1968	280	—
1975	272	−0.41%
1982	322	+2.44%
1990	688	+9.96%
1999	1,631	+10.07%
2007	1,923	+2.08%
2012	1,994	+0.73%
2017	2,011	+0.17%
2023	2,576	+4.21%
Source: INSEE

== See also ==
- Communes of the Haute-Garonne department
