= Montbrun-Lauragais =

- Commune
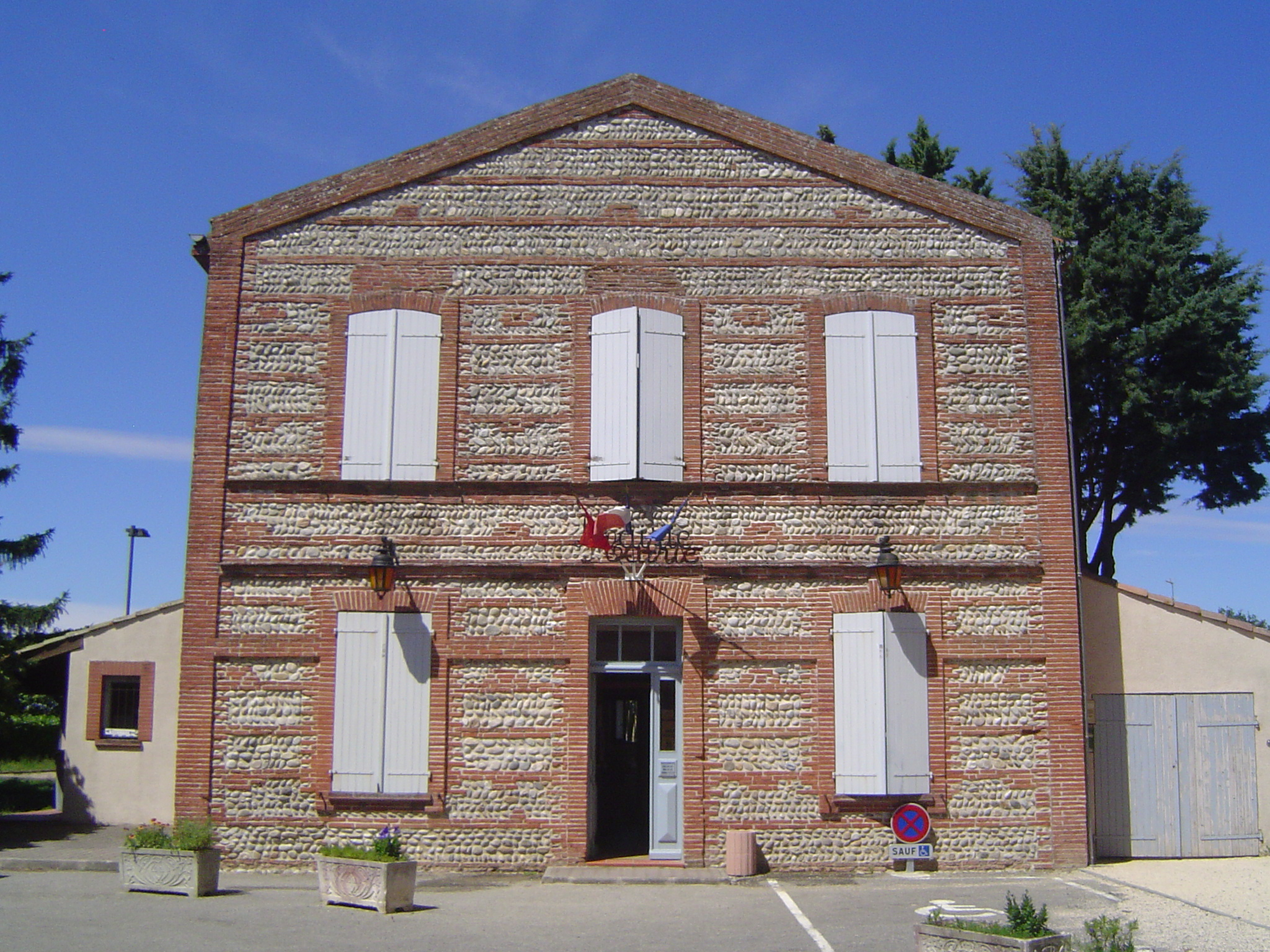
- Town hall

- Coat of arms
- Location of Montbrun-Lauragais
- Location within France Location within Occitanie
- Coordinates: 43°27′27″N 1°31′20″E
- Country: France
- Region: Occitania
- Department: Haute-Garonne
- Arrondissement: Toulouse
- Canton: Escalquens
- Intercommunality: CA Sicoval

Government
  - Mayor (2023–2026): Didier Bigeonneau
- Area^{1}: 10.92 km^{2} (4.22 sq mi)
- Elevation: 271 m (889 ft)
- Highest elevation: 284 m (932 ft)
- Lowest elevation: 175 m (574 ft)
- Population (2023): 730
  - Density: 67/km^{2} (170/sq mi)
- Time zone: UTC+01:00 (CET)
  - Summer (DST): UTC+02:00 (CEST)
- INSEE/Postal code: 31366 /31450
- ^{1} French Land Register data, which excludes lakes, ponds, glaciers > 1 km^{2} (0.386 sq mi or 247 acres) and river estuaries.

Montbrun-Lauragais (French pronunciation: [mɔ̃bʁœ̃ loʁaɡɛ]; Occitan: Montbrun de Lauragués) is a commune in the Haute-Garonne department in southwestern France.

== Population ==
Historical population
Year	Pop.	±% p.a.
1968	190	—
1975	201	+0.81%
1982	253	+3.34%
1990	360	+4.51%
1999	485	+3.37%
2007	545	+1.47%
2012	566	+0.76%
2017	611	+1.54%
2023	730	+3.01%
Source: INSEE

== See also ==
- Communes of the Haute-Garonne department
