= Préserville =

- Commune
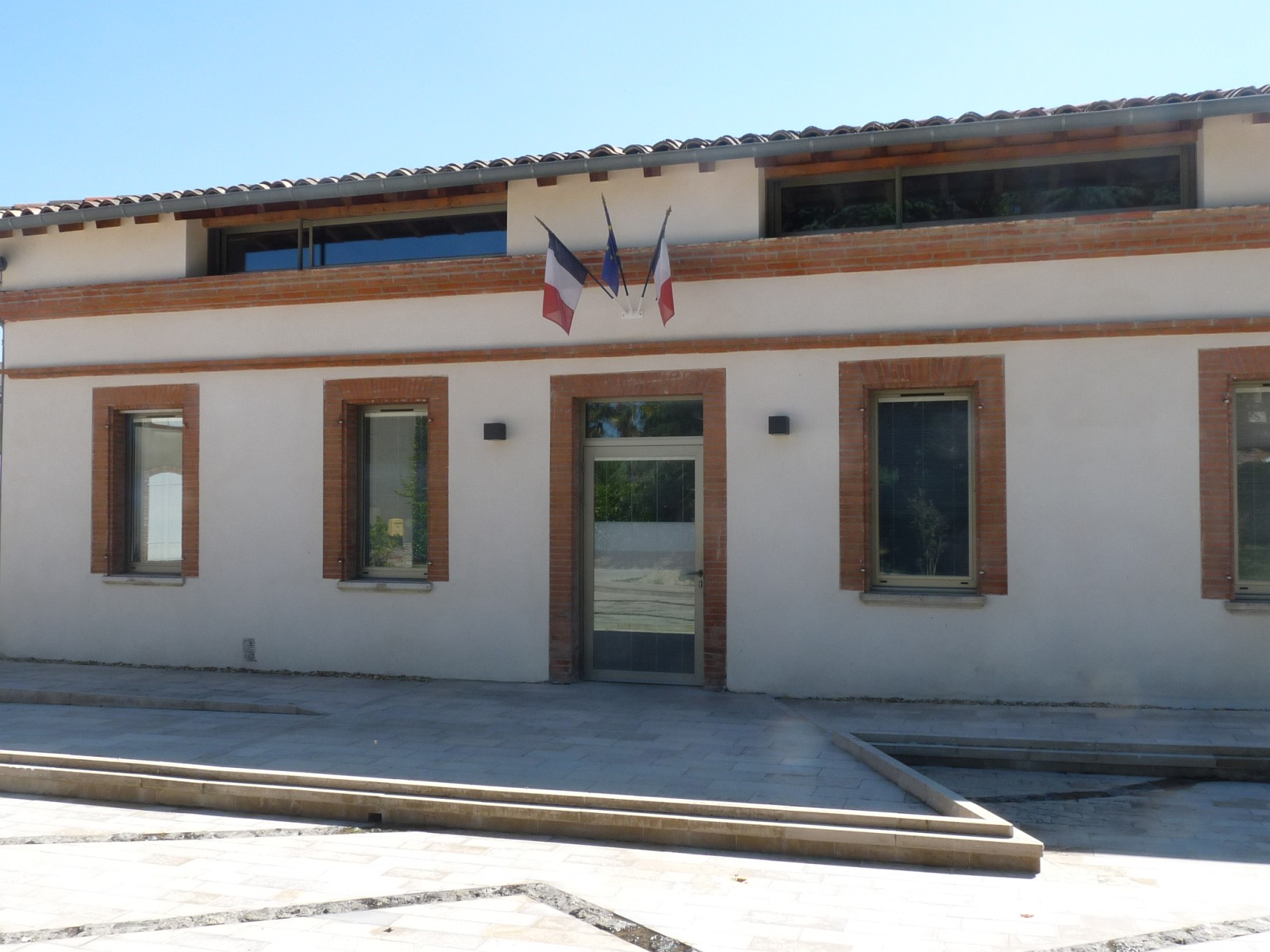
- The town hall in Préserville
- Location of Préserville
- Location within France Location within Occitanie
- Coordinates: 43°31′27″N 1°37′36″E
- Country: France
- Region: Occitania
- Department: Haute-Garonne
- Arrondissement: Toulouse
- Canton: Escalquens

Government
  - Mayor (2024–2026): Evelyne Petit
- Area^{1}: 12.19 km^{2} (4.71 sq mi)
- Elevation: 200 m (660 ft)
- Highest elevation: 232 m (761 ft)
- Lowest elevation: 158 m (518 ft)
- Population (2023): 786
  - Density: 64.5/km^{2} (167/sq mi)
- Time zone: UTC+01:00 (CET)
  - Summer (DST): UTC+02:00 (CEST)
- INSEE/Postal code: 31439 /31570
- ^{1} French Land Register data, which excludes lakes, ponds, glaciers > 1 km^{2} (0.386 sq mi or 247 acres) and river estuaries.

Préserville is a commune in the Haute-Garonne department in southwestern France.

== Population ==
Historical population
Year	Pop.	±% p.a.
1968	218	—
1975	263	+2.72%
1982	277	+0.74%
1990	297	+0.88%
1999	359	+2.13%
2007	527	+4.92%
2012	690	+5.54%
2017	707	+0.49%
2023	786	+1.78%
Source: INSEE

== See also ==
- Communes of the Haute-Garonne department
