= Mauvaisin =

- Commune
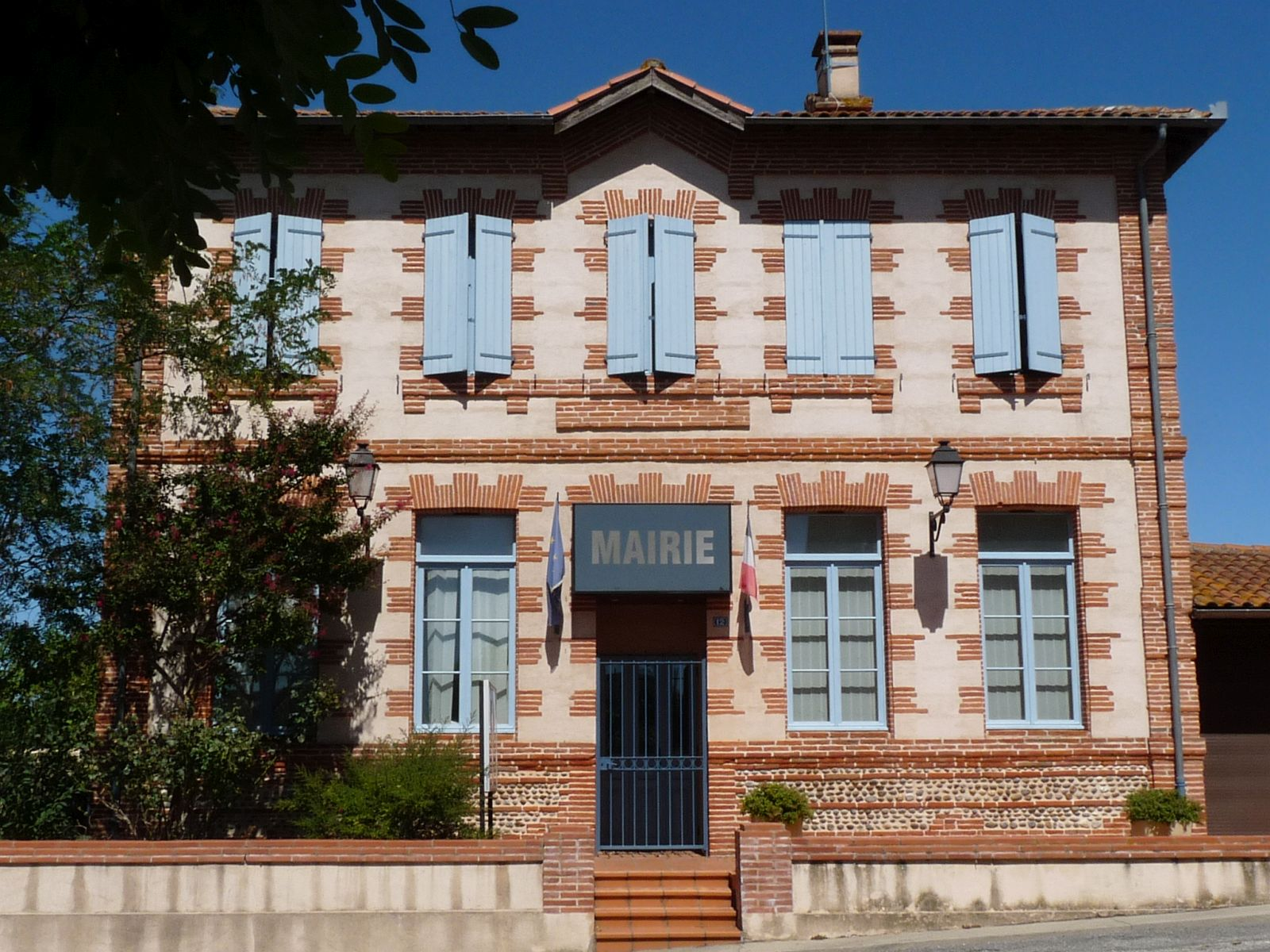
- The town hall in Mauvaisin
- Location of Mauvaisin
- Location within France Location within Occitanie
- Coordinates: 43°21′20″N 1°33′01″E
- Country: France
- Region: Occitania
- Department: Haute-Garonne
- Arrondissement: Toulouse
- Canton: Escalquens

Government
  - Mayor (2020–2026): Jérôme Crouzil
- Area^{1}: 11.05 km^{2} (4.27 sq mi)
- Elevation: 260 m (850 ft)
- Highest elevation: 301 m (988 ft)
- Lowest elevation: 196 m (643 ft)
- Population (2023): 233
  - Density: 21.1/km^{2} (54.6/sq mi)
- Time zone: UTC+01:00 (CET)
  - Summer (DST): UTC+02:00 (CEST)
- INSEE/Postal code: 31332 /31190
- ^{1} French Land Register data, which excludes lakes, ponds, glaciers > 1 km^{2} (0.386 sq mi or 247 acres) and river estuaries.

Mauvaisin (French pronunciation: [movɛzɛ̃]; Occitan: Malvesin) is a commune in the Haute-Garonne department in southwestern France.

== Population ==
Historical population
Year	Pop.	±% p.a.
1968	210	—
1975	184	−1.87%
1982	195	+0.83%
1990	225	+1.80%
1999	252	+1.27%
2007	240	−0.61%
2012	222	−1.55%
2017	233	+0.97%
2023	233	+0.00%
Source: INSEE

== See also ==
- Communes of the Haute-Garonne department
