= Montgeard =

- Commune
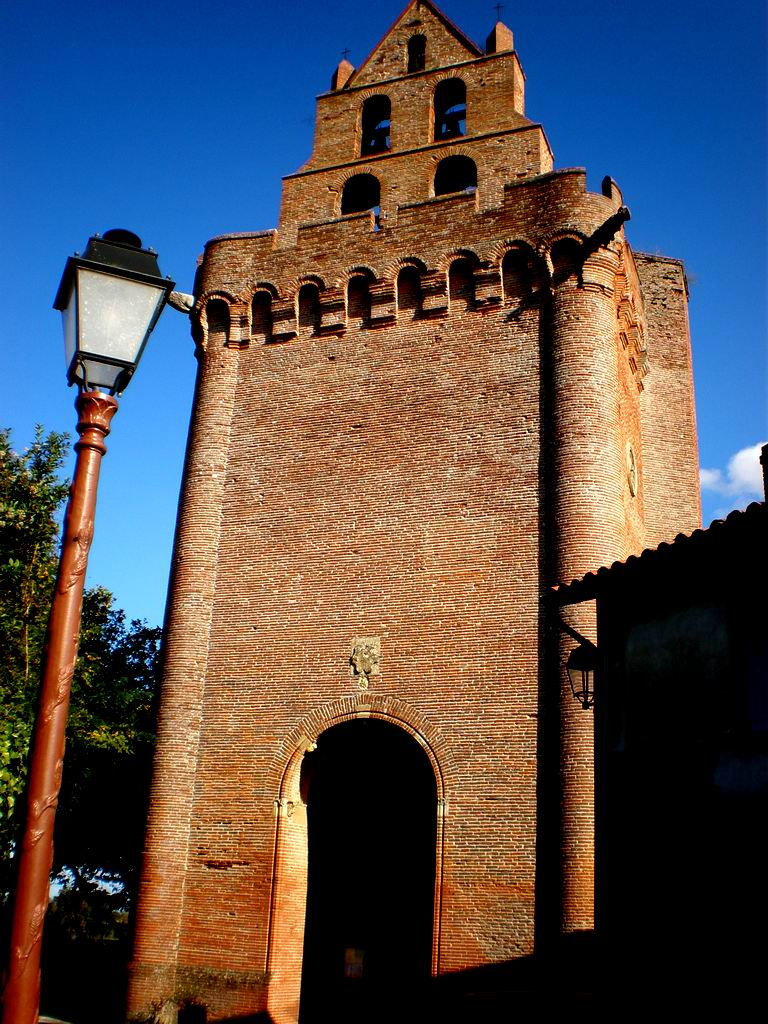
- The church in Montgeard

- Coat of arms
- Location of Montgeard
- Location within France Location within Occitanie
- Coordinates: 43°20′21″N 1°37′59″E
- Country: France
- Region: Occitania
- Department: Haute-Garonne
- Arrondissement: Toulouse
- Canton: Escalquens

Government
  - Mayor (2020–2026): Serge Kondryszyn
- Area^{1}: 9.32 km^{2} (3.60 sq mi)
- Elevation: 278 m (912 ft)
- Highest elevation: 290 m (950 ft)
- Lowest elevation: 195 m (640 ft)
- Population (2023): 568
  - Density: 60.9/km^{2} (158/sq mi)
- Time zone: UTC+01:00 (CET)
  - Summer (DST): UTC+02:00 (CEST)
- INSEE/Postal code: 31380 /31560
- ^{1} French Land Register data, which excludes lakes, ponds, glaciers > 1 km^{2} (0.386 sq mi or 247 acres) and river estuaries.

Montgeard (French pronunciation: [mɔ̃ʒaʁ]; Occitan: Montjard) is a commune in the Haute-Garonne department of southwestern France.

== Population ==
Historical population
Year	Pop.	±% p.a.
1968	228	—
1975	256	+1.67%
1982	223	−1.95%
1990	290	+3.34%
1999	323	+1.20%
2007	421	+3.37%
2012	455	+1.57%
2017	487	+1.37%
2023	568	+2.60%
Source: INSEE

== Sights ==
Montgeard is famous for its church, built during the Renaissance between 1522 and 1561, during the "golden age" of woad trade. Montgeard church is an example of Southern French Gothic in a rural sanctuary, with the use of bricks, the single-naved plan, high and narrow openings and a general austere appearance. But this rural church is also very singular because of the high quality of its decoration, the presence of foreign works of art and its daring unfinished bell-tower. Since the creation of its painted ceiling in the mid-19th Century following the example of Albi Cathedral, Montgeard church is nicknamed "Petit Albi".

== See also ==
- Communes of the Haute-Garonne department
