= Nailloux =

- Commune
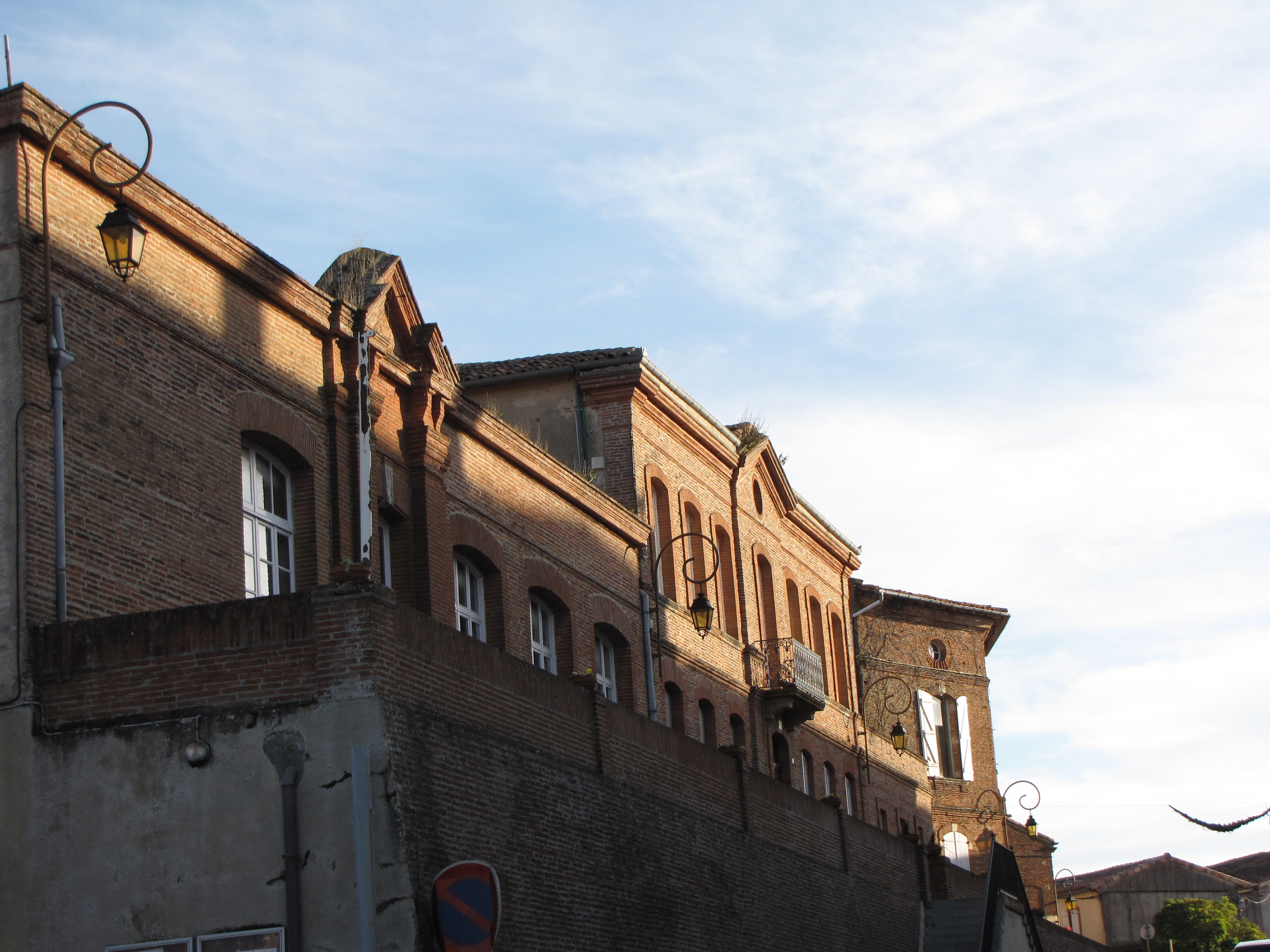
- Town hall

- Coat of arms
- Location of Nailloux
- Location within France Location within Occitanie
- Coordinates: 43°21′24″N 1°37′27″E
- Country: France
- Region: Occitania
- Department: Haute-Garonne
- Arrondissement: Toulouse
- Canton: Escalquens
- Intercommunality: Terres du Lauragais

Government
  - Mayor (2020–2026): Lison Gleyses
- Area^{1}: 18.55 km^{2} (7.16 sq mi)
- Elevation: 285 m (935 ft)
- Highest elevation: 292 m (958 ft)
- Lowest elevation: 190 m (620 ft)
- Population (2023): 4,211
  - Density: 227.0/km^{2} (587.9/sq mi)
- Time zone: UTC+01:00 (CET)
  - Summer (DST): UTC+02:00 (CEST)
- INSEE/Postal code: 31396 /31560
- ^{1} French Land Register data, which excludes lakes, ponds, glaciers > 1 km^{2} (0.386 sq mi or 247 acres) and river estuaries.

Nailloux (French pronunciation: [naju]; Languedocien: Nalhós) is a commune in the Haute-Garonne department in southwestern France.

== Population ==
Historical population
Year	Pop.	±% p.a.
1968	678	—
1975	663	−0.32%
1982	730	+1.38%
1990	1,026	+4.35%
1999	1,237	+2.10%
2007	1,999	+6.18%
2012	3,364	+10.97%
2017	3,873	+2.86%
2023	4,211	+1.40%
Source: INSEE

== Twin towns ==
Nailloux is twinned with:

- Canfranc, Spain
- Bucium, Romania

== See also ==
- Communes of the Haute-Garonne department
