= Labège =

Labège Labeja (Occitan)
- Commune
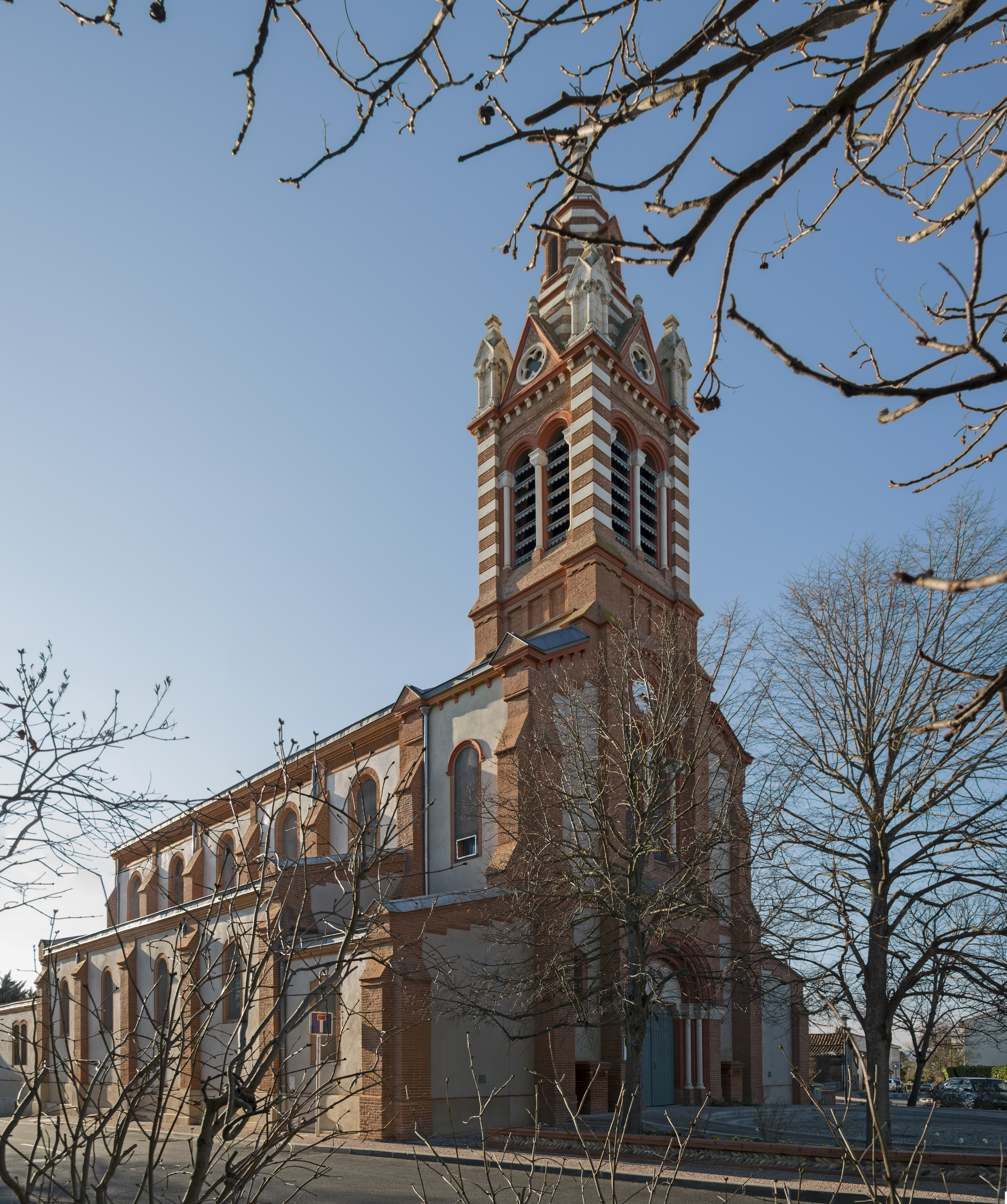
- The church in Labège

- Coat of arms
- Location of Labège
- Location within France Location within Occitanie
- Coordinates: 43°31′48″N 1°31′51″E
- Country: France
- Region: Occitania
- Department: Haute-Garonne
- Arrondissement: Toulouse
- Canton: Castanet-Tolosan
- Intercommunality: CA Sicoval

Government
  - Mayor (2020–2026): Laurent Chérubin
- Area^{1}: 7.65 km^{2} (2.95 sq mi)
- Elevation: 156 m (512 ft)
- Highest elevation: 202 m (663 ft)
- Lowest elevation: 141 m (463 ft)
- Population (2023): 4,392
  - Density: 574/km^{2} (1,490/sq mi)
- Time zone: UTC+01:00 (CET)
  - Summer (DST): UTC+02:00 (CEST)
- INSEE/Postal code: 31254 /31670
- ^{1} French Land Register data, which excludes lakes, ponds, glaciers > 1 km^{2} (0.386 sq mi or 247 acres) and river estuaries.

Labège (French pronunciation: [labɛʒ]; Occitan: Labeja) is a commune in the Haute-Garonne department in the Occitania region in Southwestern France.

== Geography ==
Labège is a commune in the metropolitan area of Toulouse. Its urban core is located in the southeast suburbs of Toulouse along the Autoroute des Deux Mers (A61) towards Narbonne. The bordering communes are Saint-Orens-de-Gameville, Auzielle, Escalquens, Castanet-Tolosan, Auzeville-Tolosane, and Ramonville-Saint-Agne. Labège-Innopole station and Labège-Village station have rail connections to Toulouse, Carcassonne and Narbonne.

== History ==
The name "Labège" may be derived from La Berge ("The Bank") because of the town's location on the banks of the Hers-Mort.

Some Roman remains can be seen in Labège; but in Roman times no actual village existed here, only a few scattered homes along the thoroughfare between Baziège and Toulouse. Even in the Middle Ages, the settlement was sparse. Fourteenth century documents mention a Labège manor, which was owned by the College of Saint Front de Périgord for the next four centuries, but only toward the end of the Renaissance did the village proper begin to take shape around the parish church.

== Politics ==
List of mayors
Term	Name	Party
28 February 1790 – 26 June 1790	curé Druilhe	
2001–2008	Claude Ducert	PS
2008–2014	Christian Lavigne	PS
2014–2016	Claude Ducert	
2016–incumbent	Laurent Chérubin	EELV

At the national level, the commune is part of the 3rd constituency of Haute-Garonne.

== Demographics ==
Historical population
Year	Pop.	±% p.a.
1968	683	—
1975	1,403	+10.83%
1982	1,628	+2.15%
1990	2,148	+3.53%
1999	3,152	+4.35%
2007	3,493	+1.29%
2012	4,139	+3.45%
2017	4,044	−0.46%
2023	4,392	+1.39%
Source: INSEE

== Economy ==
Labège is made up of two sharply contrasted districts. To the southeast is Labège Village, the residential area, with most of the homes, local shops, a gymnasium, day-care, and the largest pétanque club in the vicinity. To the northwest towards Toulouse is the economic center of the commune, Labège Innopole, incorporating the headquarters of IoT Valley, the Labège 2 shopping centre, the Gaumont Multiplex movie theatre, and many restaurants, businesses, laboratories and Institutions. A green belt separates the two districts.

== Sights ==
- The fountains of Saint-Sernin and Laurier, known for their healing waters. According to legend, during his journey from Narbonne to Toulouse, St. Sernin stopped to quench his thirst at the fountain which now bears his name, and blessed it with curative powers.
- The Church of Saint-Barthélémy. Mention is made of an earlier church on this site in 1232. A second church of 1518-1570 was destroyed by the Huguenots. Its successor stood until it was destroyed by fire in the nineteenth century. The present church dates from 1860.
- Place Saint-Barthélémy with its mansion, its sundial, its café and its imposing fountain sculpture.
- The pigeonnier du Bouysset, dating from the eighteenth century: registered as an historic monument since 11 July 1977.
- The Maison Salvan, a cultural centre devoted to exploring the interface between art and science.
- The largest pétanque club in the area.
- The war memorial near the cemetery.

== Monuments ==
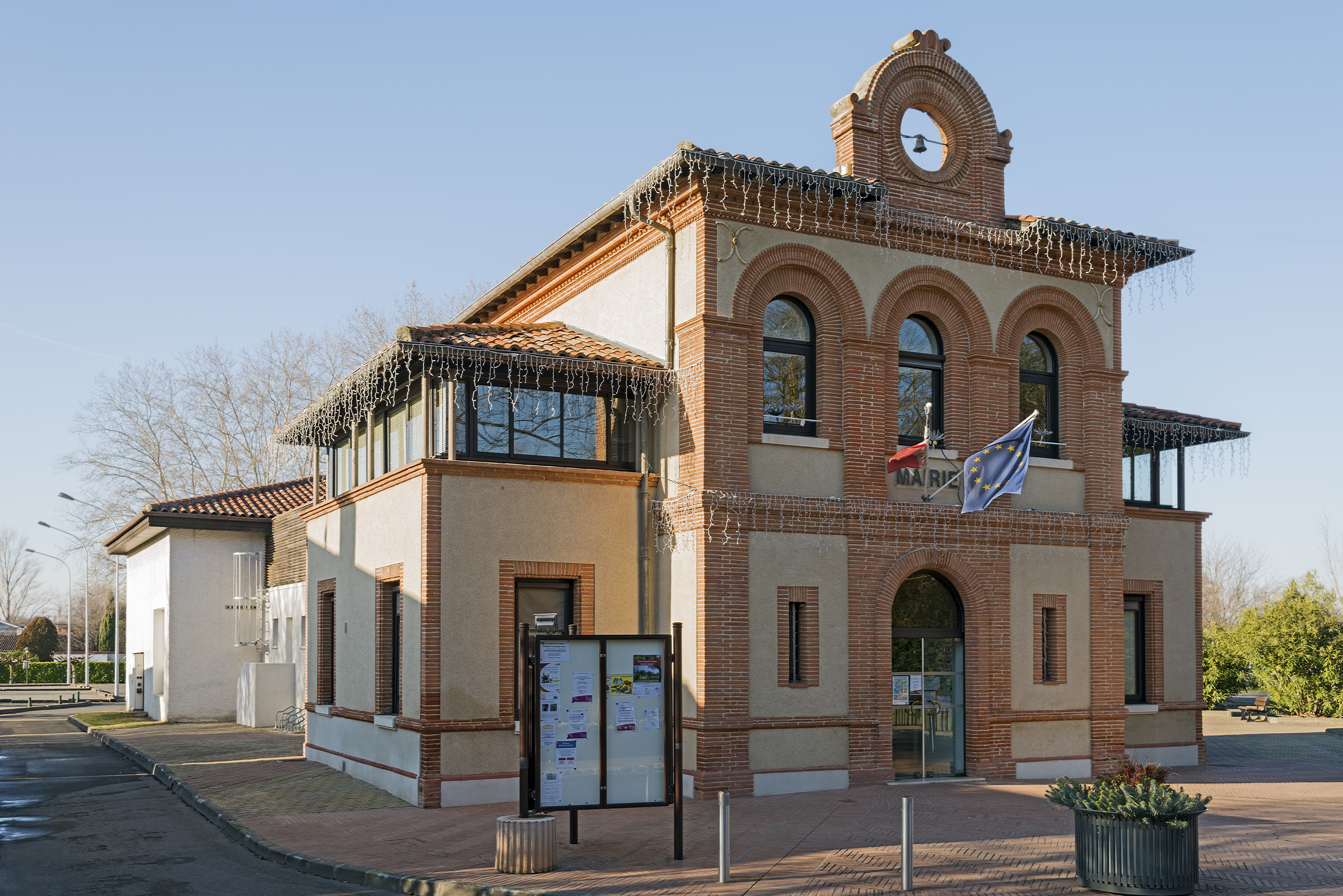
Town hall

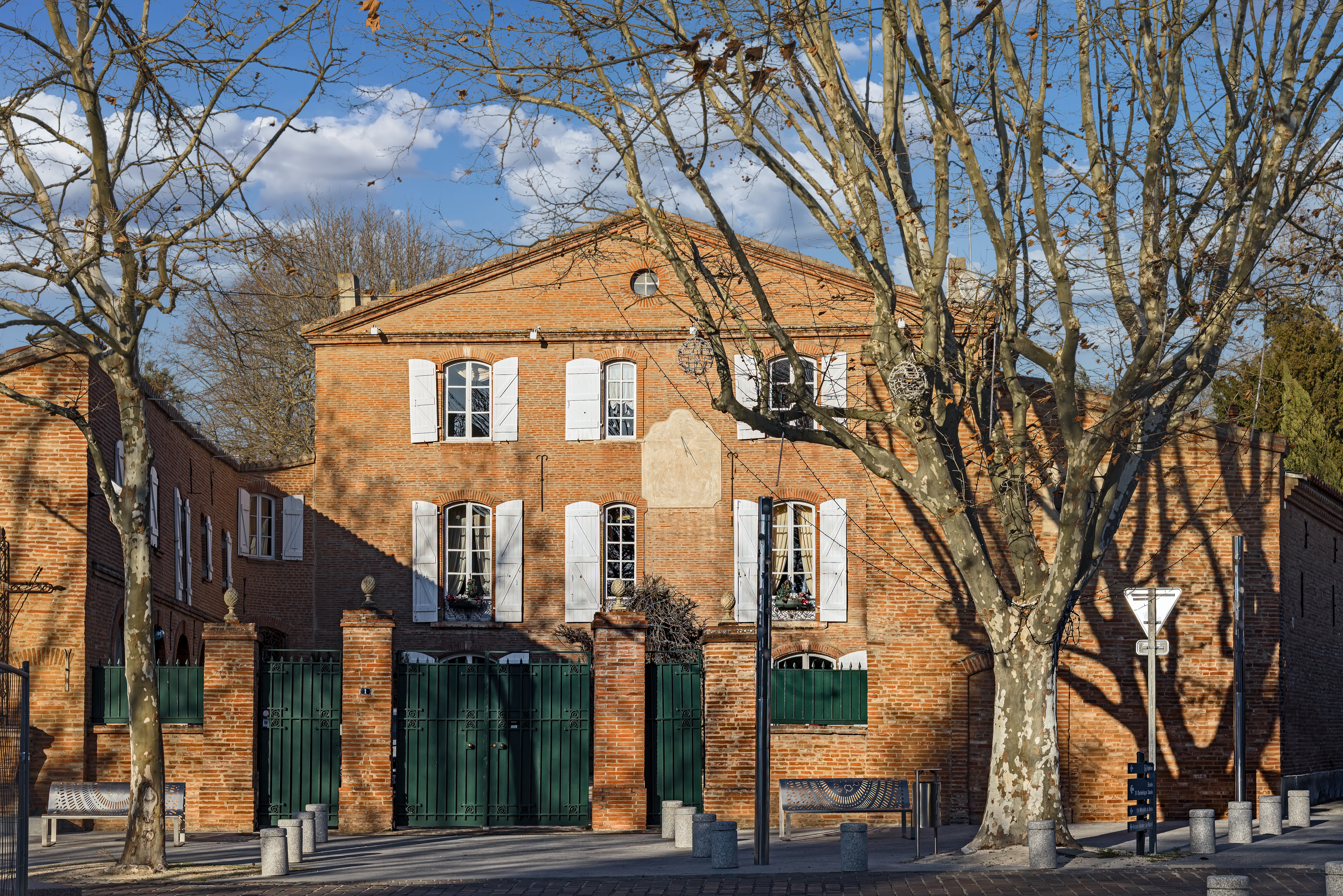
Manor House.

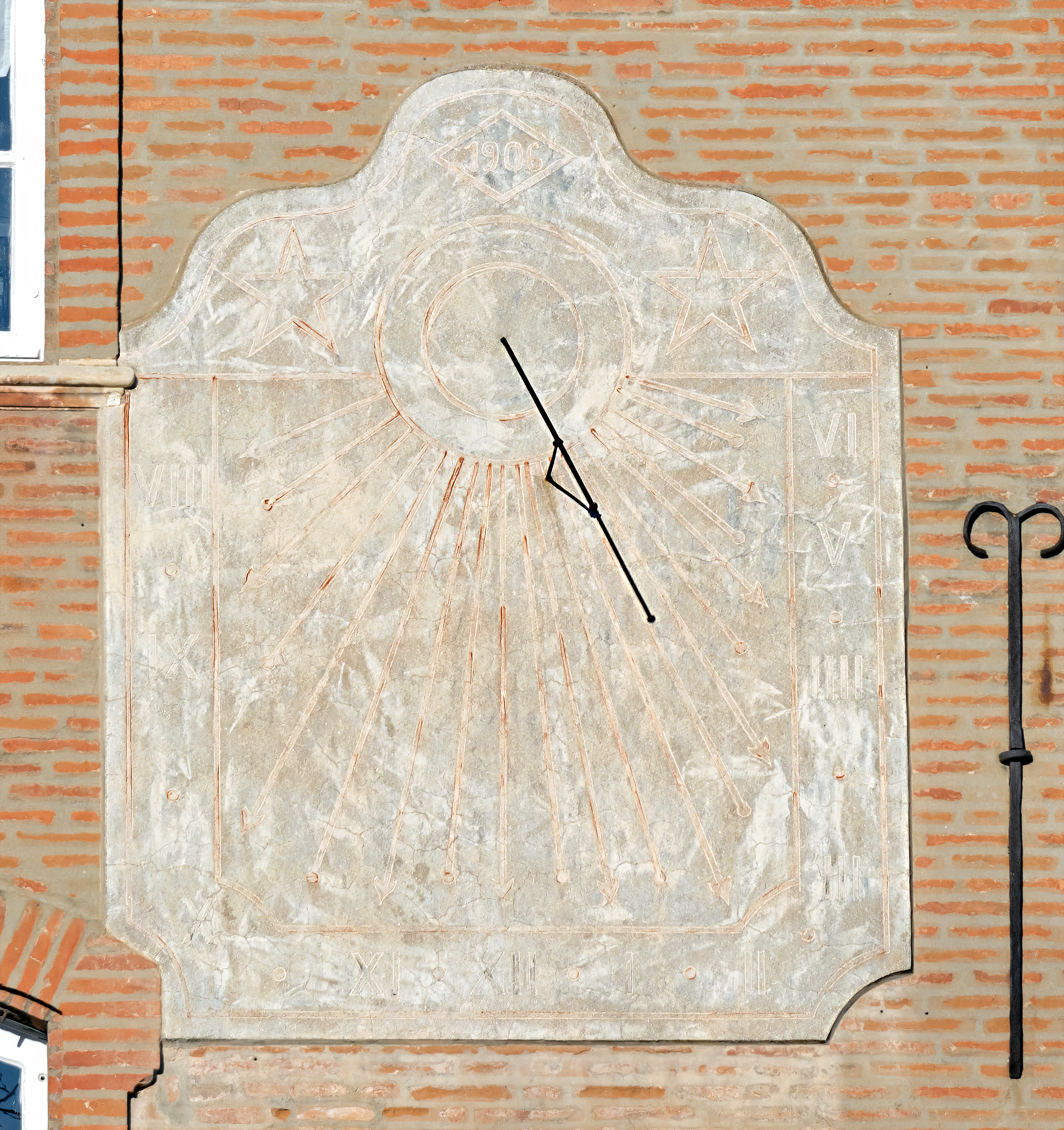
Sundial of 1906

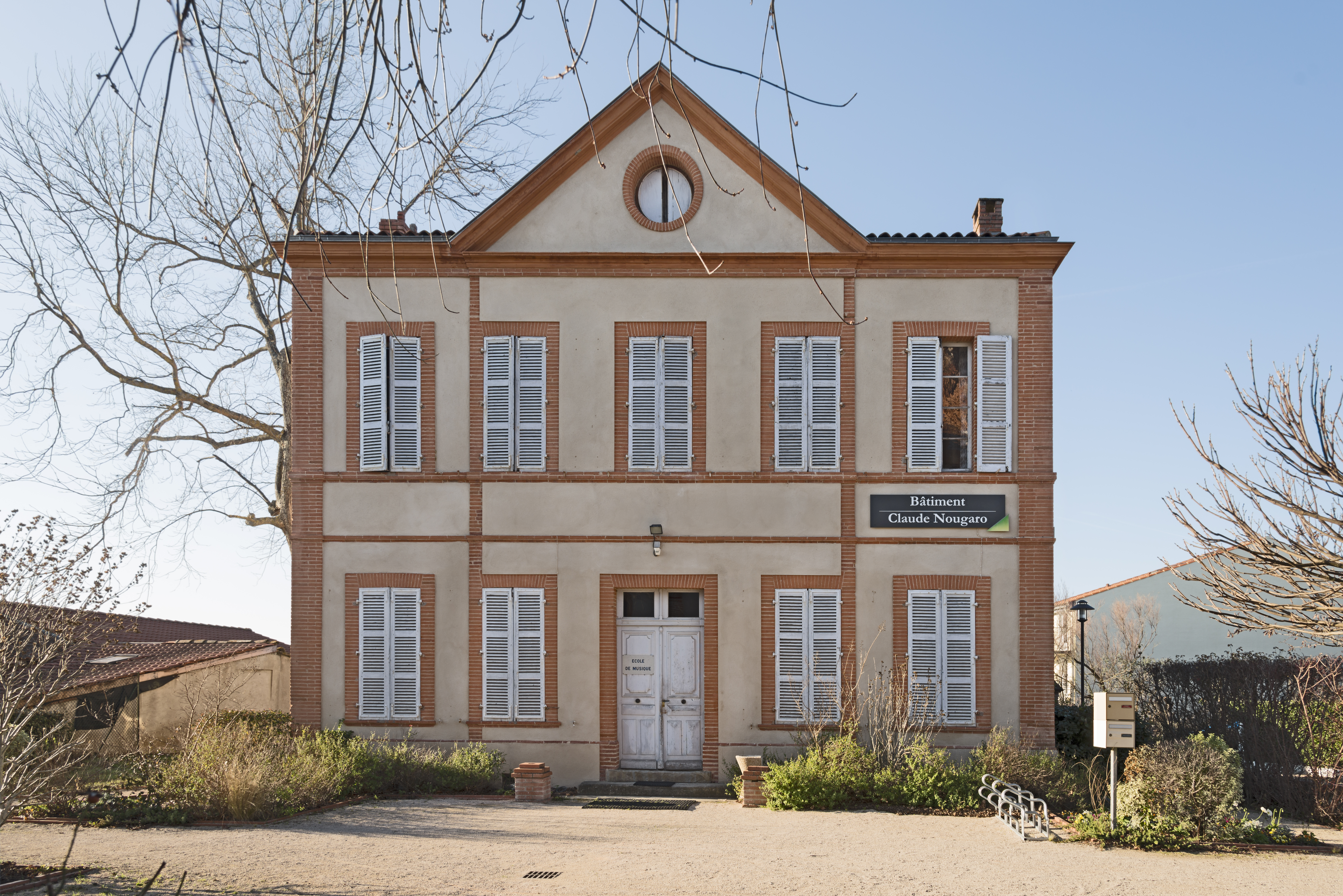
Music school Claude Nougaro

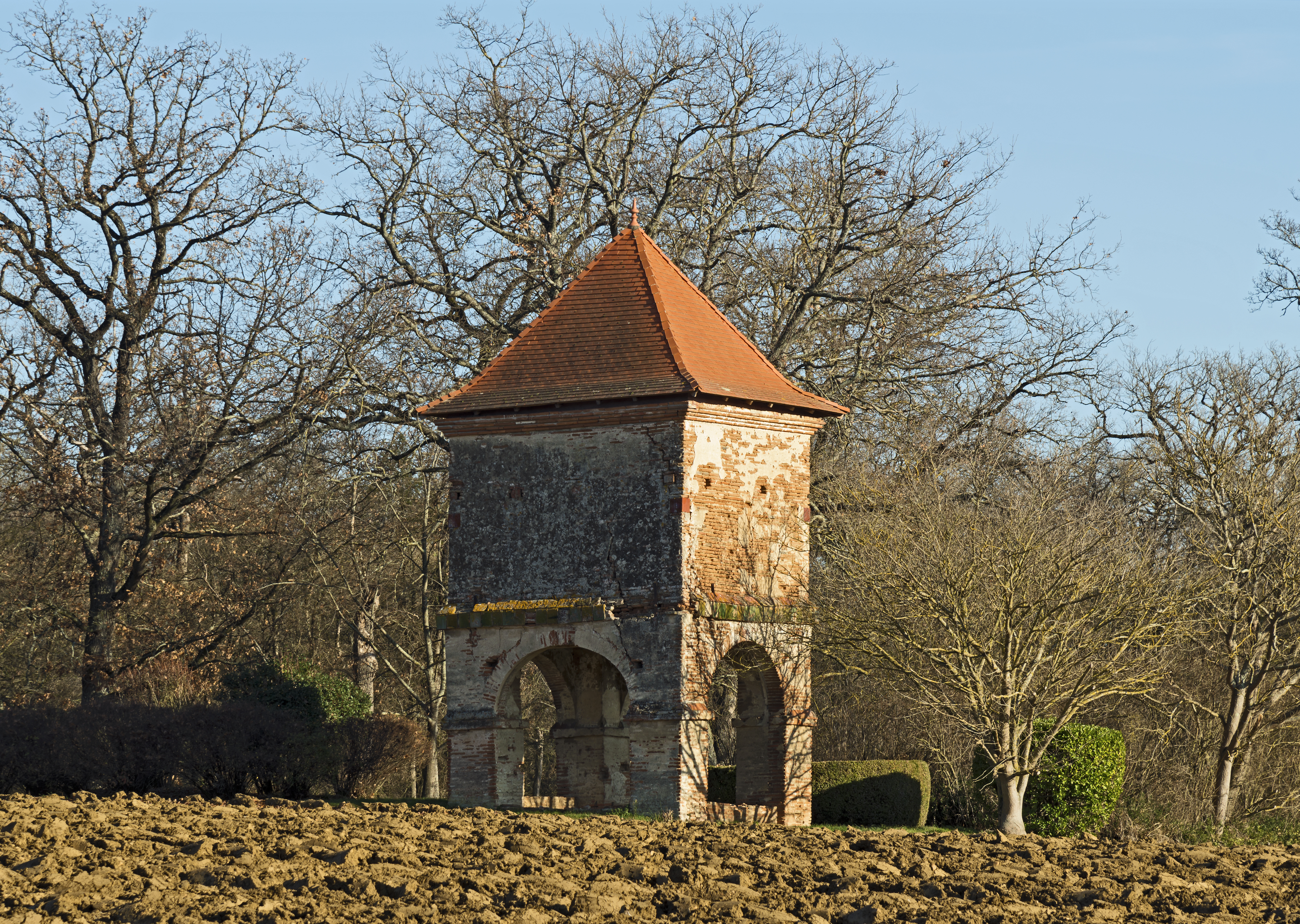
Dovecote of Bouysset.

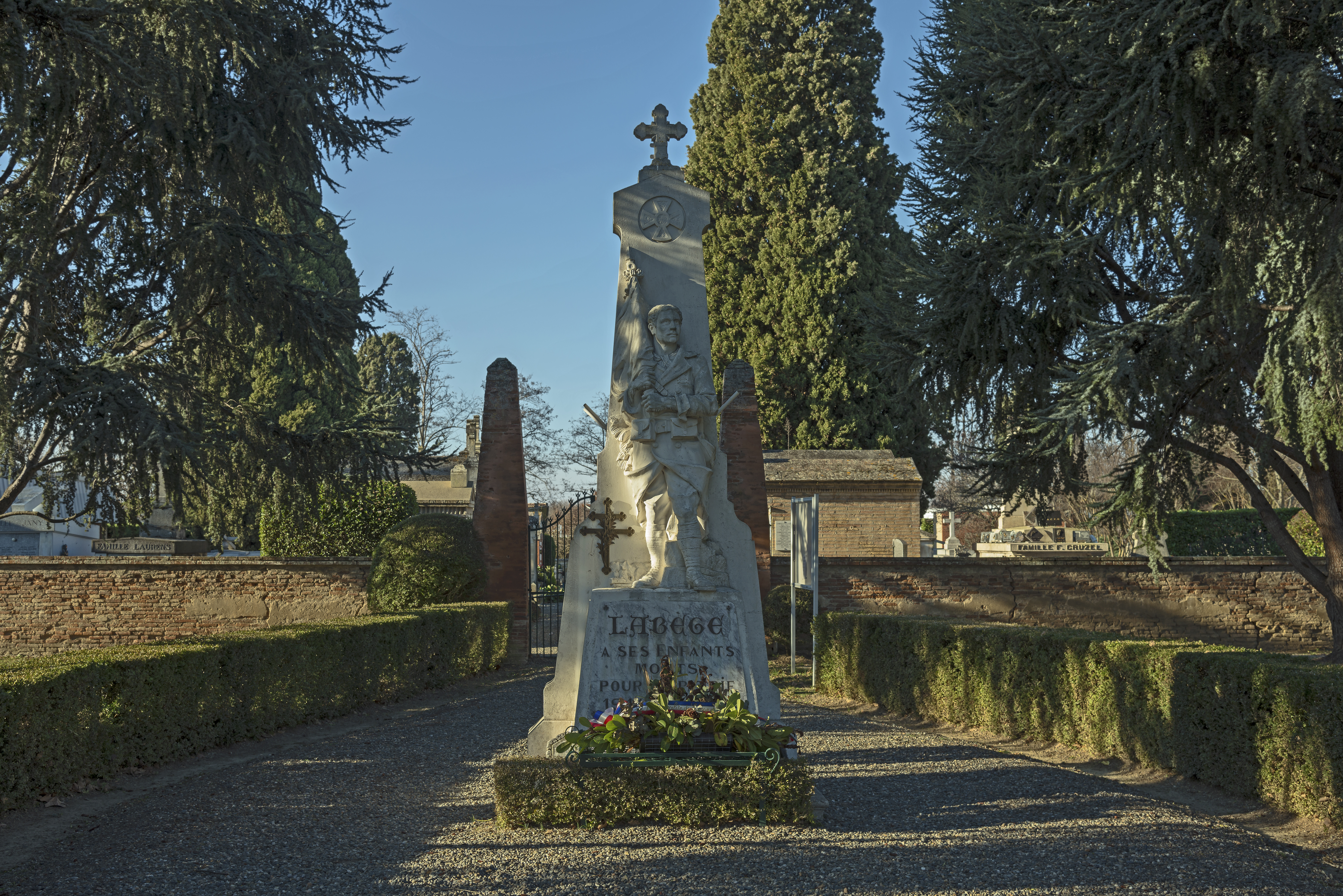
War memorial

== See also ==
Communes of the Haute-Garonne department
