= Vigoulet-Auzil =

- Commune
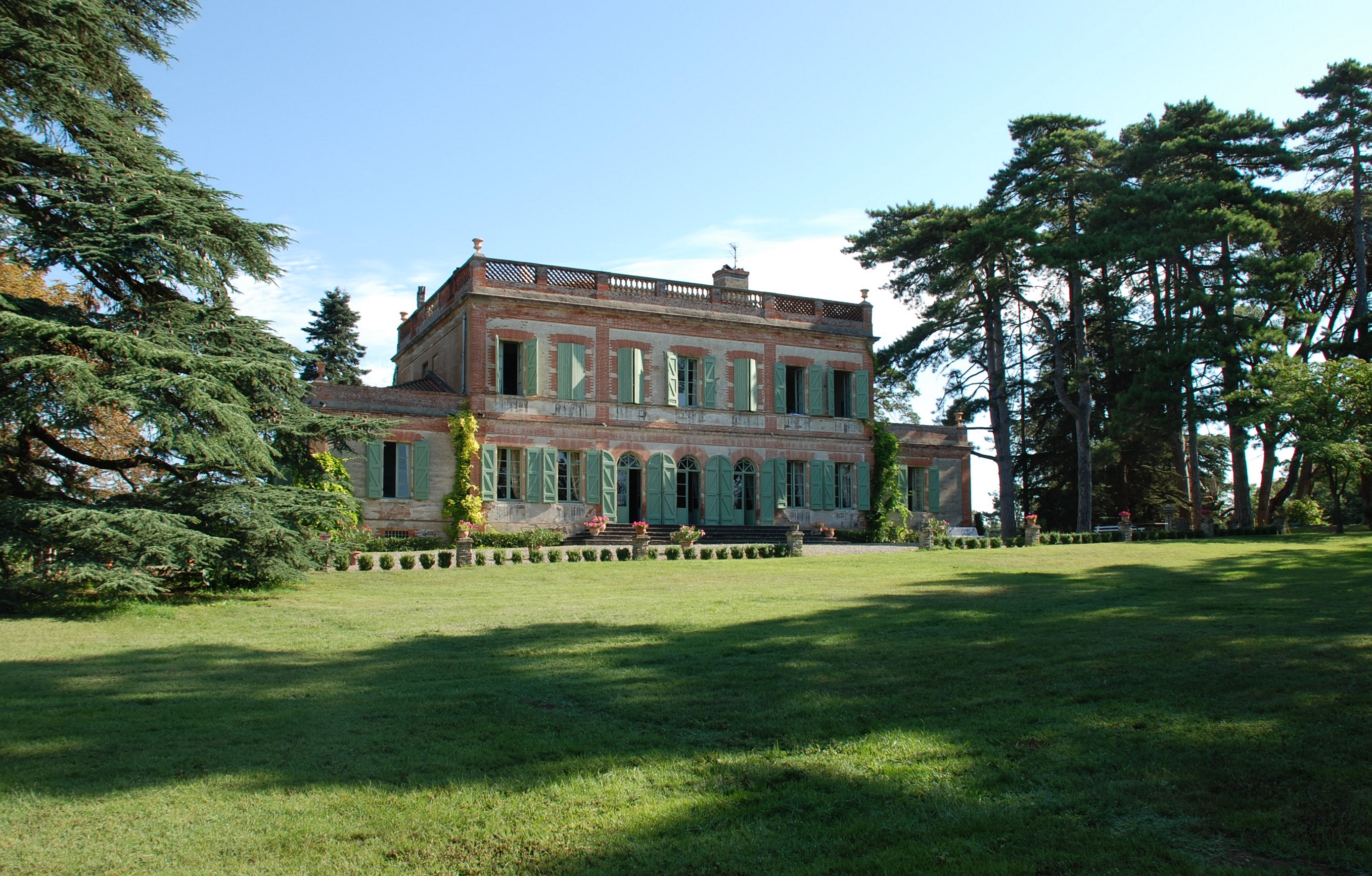
- The chateau in Vigoulet

- Coat of arms
- Location of Vigoulet-Auzil
- Location within France Location within Occitanie
- Coordinates: 43°30′29″N 1°27′38″E
- Country: France
- Region: Occitania
- Department: Haute-Garonne
- Arrondissement: Toulouse
- Canton: Castanet-Tolosan
- Intercommunality: CA Sicoval

Government
  - Mayor (2020–2026): Jacques Ségéric
- Area^{1}: 3.46 km^{2} (1.34 sq mi)
- Elevation: 250 m (820 ft)
- Highest elevation: 262 m (860 ft)
- Lowest elevation: 169 m (554 ft)
- Population (2023): 1,040
  - Density: 301/km^{2} (778/sq mi)
- Time zone: UTC+01:00 (CET)
  - Summer (DST): UTC+02:00 (CEST)
- INSEE/Postal code: 31578 /31320
- ^{1} French Land Register data, which excludes lakes, ponds, glaciers > 1 km^{2} (0.386 sq mi or 247 acres) and river estuaries.

Vigoulet-Auzil (French pronunciation: [viɡulɛ ozil]; Occitan: Vigolen e Ausil) is a French commune located in the department of Haute-Garonne, in the Occitanie region. It is part of the urban unit of Toulouse and is a member of the urban community of Sicoval. It is located on the northern end of the southern slopes of Lauragais, above Ramonville-Saint-Agne and Castanet-Tolosan, in the southern suburbs of Toulouse. The municipal population was 906 inhabitants in 2015.

Historically, and because of its geographical location the village has always lived in the Toulouse orbit, many capitouls and councilors of the Toulouse parliament, under the Ancien Régime, were Lords of Vigoulet or holders of domains in the communal territory. The demographic boom dates from the end of the 1960s, until then the population was small and the activity exclusively agricultural, mainly cereals.

Today, the dominant feature of Vigoulet-Auzil is its residential character, in a preserved environment that is still very sparsely populated, while benefiting from easy communication to the city center and the Toulouse ring road.

The village draw its notoriety from this residential quality, from the hillside landscapes and horse-riding activities linked to the presence of the two equestrian centers and of a pony club. Environmental protection is today a major issue for the village, in the context of the pressure exerted by the demographic growth of the Toulouse conurbation.

== Geography ==
=== Localisation ===
Vigoulet-Auzil is a town in the urban area of Toulouse located in its agglomeration, in the southern suburbs, 13 km south of the center of Toulouse.

=== Transports ===
From Toulouse, Vigoulet-Auzil is notably accessible by the RD 35 from Ramonville-Saint-Agne, a city 5 km away, served by Toulouse underground Line B (Ramonville station). A transport service on demand (Line TAD 1192) operates daily according to the practical modalities (timetables, stations) specified on the Tisseo site as well as on the site of the municipality and that of Sicoval. This on-demand transport service in the Toulouse metropolitan area was met with great success.

By car, the connection from Vigoulet with Toulouse is frequently made via Pechbusque or Vieille-Toulouse (RD35b) towards Chemin des Étroits (RD4) along the Garonne. The connection with Toulouse-Blagnac airport is via the southern ring road.

== Population ==
Historical population
Year	Pop.	±% p.a.
1968	212	—
1975	500	+13.04%
1982	735	+5.66%
1990	927	+2.94%
1999	990	+0.73%
2007	962	−0.36%
2012	930	−0.67%
2017	904	−0.57%
2023	1,040	+2.36%
Source: INSEE

== See also ==
- Communes of the Haute-Garonne department
