= Persik (disambiguation) =

Peach in Indonesia also known as Persik (Prunis persica) is a fruit-bearing plant from the Rosaceae family.

Persik or Perssik may also refer to:

== People ==
- Dewi Perssik (born 1985), Indonesian singer and presenter.

== Sports ==
- Persik (endurance horse), a racehorse
- Persik Kediri, football club (founded 1950) based in Kediri City, East Java, Indonesia.
- Persik Kendal, football club (founded 1970) based in Kendal Regency, Central Java, Indonesia.
