= Canton of Castanet-Tolosan =

Coordinates: 43.52°N 1.50°E

The canton of Castanet-Tolosan is an administrative division of the Haute-Garonne department, southern France. Its borders were not modified at the French canton reorganisation which came into effect in March 2015. Its seat is in Castanet-Tolosan.

It consists of the following communes:

1. Aureville
2. Auzeville-Tolosane
3. Auzielle
4. Castanet-Tolosan
5. Clermont-le-Fort
6. Goyrans
7. Labège
8. Lacroix-Falgarde
9. Mervilla
10. Péchabou
11. Pechbusque
12. Rebigue
13. Saint-Orens-de-Gameville
14. Vieille-Toulouse
15. Vigoulet-Auzil
