= Persik (endurance horse) =

French endurance riding horse

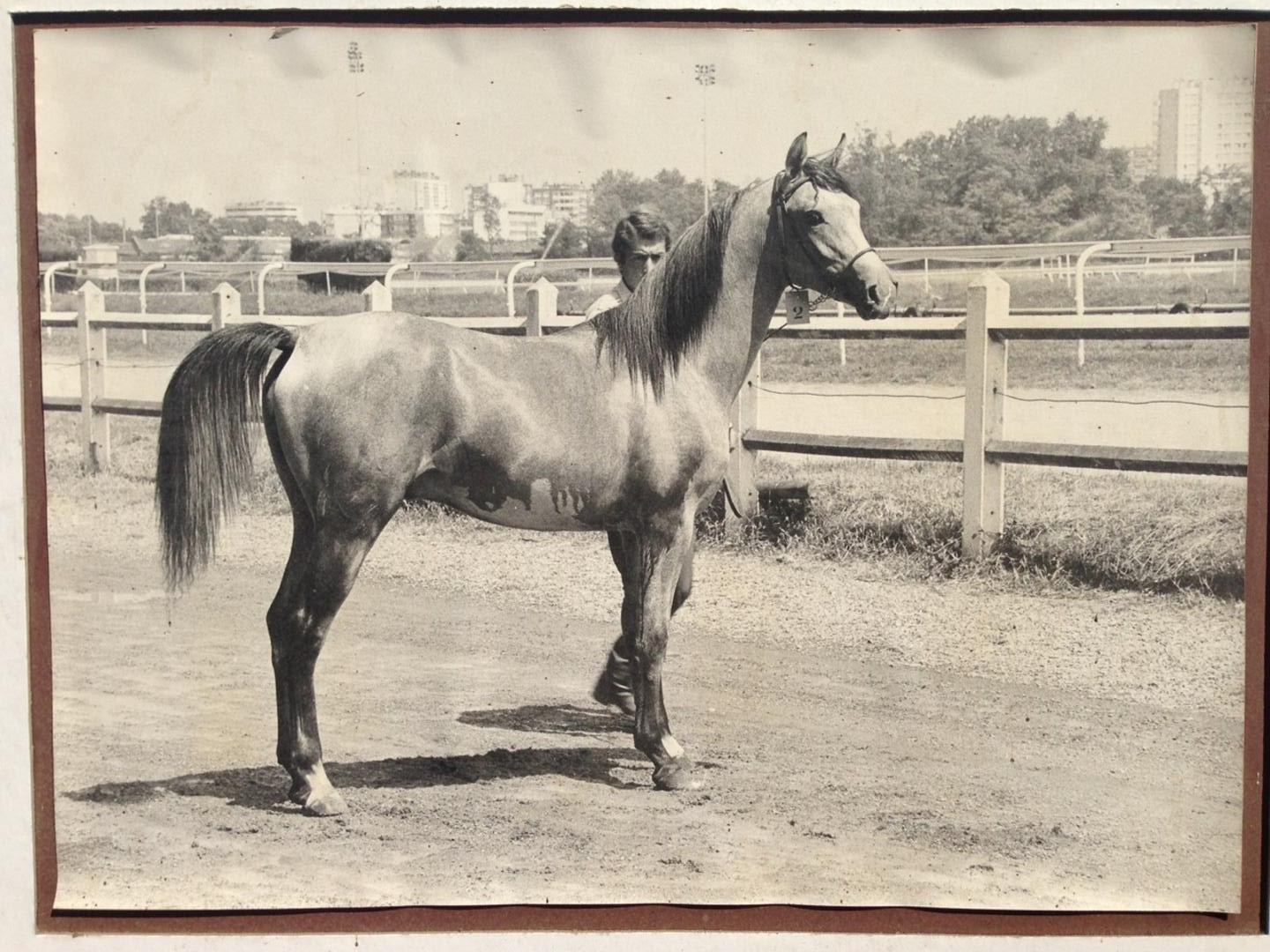
- Persik and Pierre Cougul on the Cépière racecourse in Toulouse in 1974
- Breed: Arabian horse
- Sire: Kankan
- Dam: Pamiatka
- Sex: Stallion
- Foaled: 1 April 1969; Soviet Union
- Died: 24 August 2001

Persik (1 April 1969 – 24 August 2001) was a gray Arabian horse who was the leading sire in the equestrian discipline of endurance from 1975 until his death in 2001. His eclectic origins include Polish and Russian bloodlines, as well as French and English, in particular the famous Skowronek. Purchased in 1973 from the Tersk stud farm, Persik was imported to France by Jean Cougul, a breeder from Vigoulet-Auzil, then bought by the Cévennes National Park with the aim of breeding horses suitable for trail riding. In 1975, Persik won the first edition of a well-known endurance race, the 130 km de Florac.

Although he won this event a second time with his rider Jean-Marie Fabre, Persik was better known for his breeding career than for his short sporting career. Specialized farms and structures were set up in the Grands Causses and Garrigues regions of Languedoc to promote him. He was the ancestor of many French national and international endurance raid winners, including Melfenik, Arquès Perspex, Flamme d'Avril and Out Law Persik. Persik is still considered one of the world's finest endurance stallions. A wooden sculpture of him was erected in the commune of Vigoulet-Auzil in 2017.

== History ==
Persik was born on 1 April 1969 at the Tersk stud farm in Russia's Caucasus region. The stallion was acquired at an auction in Pyatigorsk, Russia, at the age of 4, in 1973, by Jean Cougul, a French breeder based in Vigoulet-Auzil, Haute-Garonne. With equestrian tourism on the rise in France, the Cévennes National Park, under the direction of Mr. Montjauze, set up a breeding program under the aegis of Yves Richardier and the Uzès National Stud, aimed at breeding horses suitable for mountain riding. After a few trials with Mérens, the Arabian horse was chosen to improve local horses. Persik was purchased by the Cévennes National Park in 1974 for 30,000 francs. Entrusted to Yves Richardier, he began a breeding career with mares of various origins and qualities, the vast majority of which were undocumented and of unknown origin. This program had two components: the creation of a union of endurance horse breeders (the future "Persikland", formalized in 1976) and the creation of a race modelled on the Tevis Cup Ride.

The 130 km de Florac, later renamed the 160 km de Florac, the first endurance race to be held in France, was designed to promote breeding in the Cévennes National Park. In 1975, Persik, ridden and trained by Jean-Marie Fabre, won the first edition of this race in 6 h 25, averaging 6.92 m/s or 24.9 km/h. The following year, in the second edition of the raid, Persik again came first out of 27 competitors. Persik's fame as a stallion is largely due to these two races, as he did not race much. Unable to reconcile a career as a sport horse with the travel required by his activity as a breeding stallion, he experienced a number of health problems, perhaps due to the pace of his activities.

In 1983, Persik won the national model and gait competition in his category. Until 1987, the stallion continued his breeding career without any particular objectives. He was leased by the syndicat des éleveurs de la Drôme, then by Gomarel Arabian's stud. From 1988, the breeders' objectives shifted to the production of purebred Arabian horses for top-level endurance racing. Persik was stationed for two consecutive seasons at the Picq-Vassas breeding farm, at La Pénarié on the Causse Noir, before the Cévennes National Park (run by Yves Richardier) led his career. From then on, Persik only covered Arabian mares. In 1989, an endurance team was created by the national park, exclusively with Persik's offspring born and bred by them.

Persik was retired in 1991, under the care of Marie-Jose Barthe Richardier, breeding Indian Arabian's, in Saint-Affrique. The day after the World Equestrian Endurance Championship at Compiègne, in August 2000, he was crowned the world's best endurance sire, at the age of 32. As he grew older, Persik was exhausted by the climate of Mont Aigoual. He died on 24 August 2001.

== Description ==
Standing 1.53 m tall, Persik was an Arabian horse of Saklawi Jedran lineage. He wore a gray coat. He had a very expressive, clearly Arabized (concave) head, ears described as beautiful, and a long neck. On the other hand, his back was a little long for an Arabian horse.

== Achievements ==
Persik's sporting achievements have earned him the highest Endurance Recognition Index (ERI) of 4 stars (****). Thanks to his performance as a sire, he has also been awarded the Descendance reproduction endurance (DRE) label ****. He is one of the few French endurance stallions to have obtained this maximum double label.

- 1975: Winner of the 130 km of Florac.
- 1976: Winner of the 130 km de Florac, 19 minutes ahead of Barol, winner of the 100 km de Rodez.
- 1983: French endurance runner-up to Nichem. Winner of the model and gait competition for Arabian stallions aged 8 to 18, at the Concours national de Arnac-Pompadour.
- 1990: best European endurance sire.
- 2000: World's best endurance sire.

== Origins ==
Persik was considered an Arabian stallion descended from Polish and Russian bloodlines. He descended from the mare Emese, imported to France in 1877, one of whose descendants is Caravane, an oriental Arabian horse born in 1907 by Chakir, himself the sire of Carabine and the mare Djebel. Djebel was imported to the Tersk Stud in the USSR, along with the filly who was Persik's great-granddam, Dikarka. Denouste, Persik's paternal great-great-grandfather, was recognized as the best Arabian speed stallion of the 20th century. Persik was thus descended from one of the oldest French oriental strains imported into the USSR and Poland, with crosses of English, Polish and Egyptian oriental strains.

Pedigree of Persik
Sire Kankan (1952)	Korej (1939)	Kann (1957)	Denouste
Sire Kankan (1952)	Korej (1939)	Kann (1957)	Kita
Sire Kankan (1952)	Korej (1939)	Rixalina (1929)	Raseem
Sire Kankan (1952)	Korej (1939)	Rixalina (1929)	Rissla
Sire Kankan (1952)	Nagrada (1938)	Naseem (1922)	Skowronek
Sire Kankan (1952)	Nagrada (1938)	Naseem (1922)	Nasra
Sire Kankan (1952)	Nagrada (1938)	Rixalina (1929)	Raseem
Sire Kankan (1952)	Nagrada (1938)	Rixalina (1929)	Rissla
Dam Pamiatka (1961)	Arax (1952)	Amurath Sahib (1932)	35 Amurath II
Dam Pamiatka (1961)	Arax (1952)	Amurath Sahib (1932)	Sahiba
Dam Pamiatka (1961)	Arax (1952)	Angara (1947)	Wielki Szlem
Dam Pamiatka (1961)	Arax (1952)	Angara (1947)	Brda
Dam Pamiatka (1961)	Piramida (1945)	Piolun (1934)	Koheilan I
Dam Pamiatka (1961)	Piramida (1945)	Piolun (1934)	Dziewanna
Dam Pamiatka (1961)	Piramida (1945)	Dikarka (1930)	Denouste
Dam Pamiatka (1961)	Piramida (1945)	Dikarka (1930)	Carabine

== Descent ==
Persik left an indelible mark on endurance riding in France, and a substantial genetic legacy. His reputation grew in 1983, when his son Krempolis became French endurance champion at the age of 7. More than 100 of his offspring are placed in top-level endurance competitions. He sired 328 horses in 24 years as a stallion, producing 13 to 14 foals a year. Around 171 were Arabians, 106 were registered saddle horses, 19 were Selle Français, 9 Anglo-Arabs, 15 French Saddle Ponies, 15 Barb-Arabs and 3 Shagya. Over 40% of his descendants were classified in A or B endurance competitions, and 32 of his direct descendants have won at least one international endurance competition. In 1990, at the World Equestrian Games in Stockholm and the World Equestrian Endurance Championship, Persik was recognized as the best European sire in the discipline from 1975 to 1990.

This recognition was due to the quality of his offspring, both males and females, in the first and second generations. Despite the transmission of a slightly too long back, the performance of Persik's offspring remains unaffected. Out Law Persik, Arquès Perspex and his daughter Flamme d'Avril, dam of Gimini Courthouse, are among his best foals. His son Melfenik, bred by the Parc National des Cévennes, was runner-up at the 1994 World Equestrian Games with Denis Pesce. His daughter Sylène de la Drôme was European endurance vice-champion. Two of his sons excelled at the World Endurance Championships at the 2002 World Equestrian Games in Jerez, Spain, and were the subject of million-dollar bids. Out Law Persik, a Shagya studbook performance stallion and son of Persik and Zilavka, won the 160 km Florac in 1989 and the Gap in 1990. He died suddenly in 1994, after a breeding season at the Haras National d'Uzès.

Persik was voted the world's best endurance breeding stallion in 2000, after two of his offspring won the World Equestrian Endurance Championship in Compiègne, taking team gold and individual gold and silver medals. In 2016, out of 113 endurance races run worldwide, 226 horses identified were both descended from Persik and present in the Top Ten. He iswasthe only French endurance sire to be represented as a sire of competitors from 1999 to 2007. In 1999, he was by far the most represented sire of endurance competitors.

== Legacy and tributes ==
Persik's presence led to the development of endurance horse breeding and promotion structures in the southern French regions of Lozère, Gard and Hérault, particularly in the Grands Causses and Languedoc garrigues, from 1975 onwards. He is considered one of France's finest endurance horses, and remains the only one to have won the Florac race two years running.

In September 2011, a permanent exhibition dedicated to Persik was created on a roundabout in the commune of Meyrueis.

In August 2017, a subscription was launched to finance an oak statue of Persik, to be erected in the commune of Vigoulet-Auzil. The project came to fruition in September 2017, with the trunk being carved in three weeks by Willy Niodo, France's champion chainsaw carver. The statue was officially inaugurated on 29 June 2018.

An international, eco-responsible endurance race, organized in the Gard in 2016, was named The Persik Trail.

== See also ==
- Tersk Stud

== Bibliography ==
- Allagnon, Julie (2011). Évolution de l'élevage du Pur-sang arabe d'endurance ces dix dernières années [Evolution of Arabian endurance breeding over the last ten years] (in French). École nationale vétérinaire d'Alfort.
- Beillard, Pierre-Henri; Pechdo, Pierre; de Montal, Luc; Bégaud, Jack (1995). L'élevage du cheval d'endurance en France, origine et enjeux : 20ème anniversaire des 160 km de Florac et de l'endurance contemporaine française [Endurance horse breeding in France, origins and challenges: 20th anniversary of the 160 km of Florac and contemporary French endurance.] (in French). Parc national des Cévennes.
- The Cévennes National Park: the cradle of endurance-horse breeding (PDF). Parc national des Cévennes. 2011. Archived from the original (PDF) on 13 October 2017.
- Loving, Nancy (2004). Tenir la distance : Tout sur le cheval d'endurance [Going the distance: All about the endurance horse]. Série Cheval (in French). Actes Sud. ISBN 2-7427-4277-8.
- Rossdale, Peter; Green, Rachel (2001). Guardians of the horse II. Romney Publications. p. 224. ISBN 0-9541587-1-7.
- Magaud-Dat, Myriam (2001). Décrypter les indices endurance [Deciphering endurance indices] (in French). Cheval pratique.
- Richardier, Yves (2003). Persik, de Tersk à la légende [Persik, from Tersk to legend] (in French). Les cahiers du cheval arabe.
- Richardier, Yves (2017). L'héritage de Persik dans l'endurance mondiale [Persik's legacy in world endurance racing] (in French). Les cahiers du cheval arabe.
