= Escalquens station =

Railway station in Escalquens, France

Escalquens
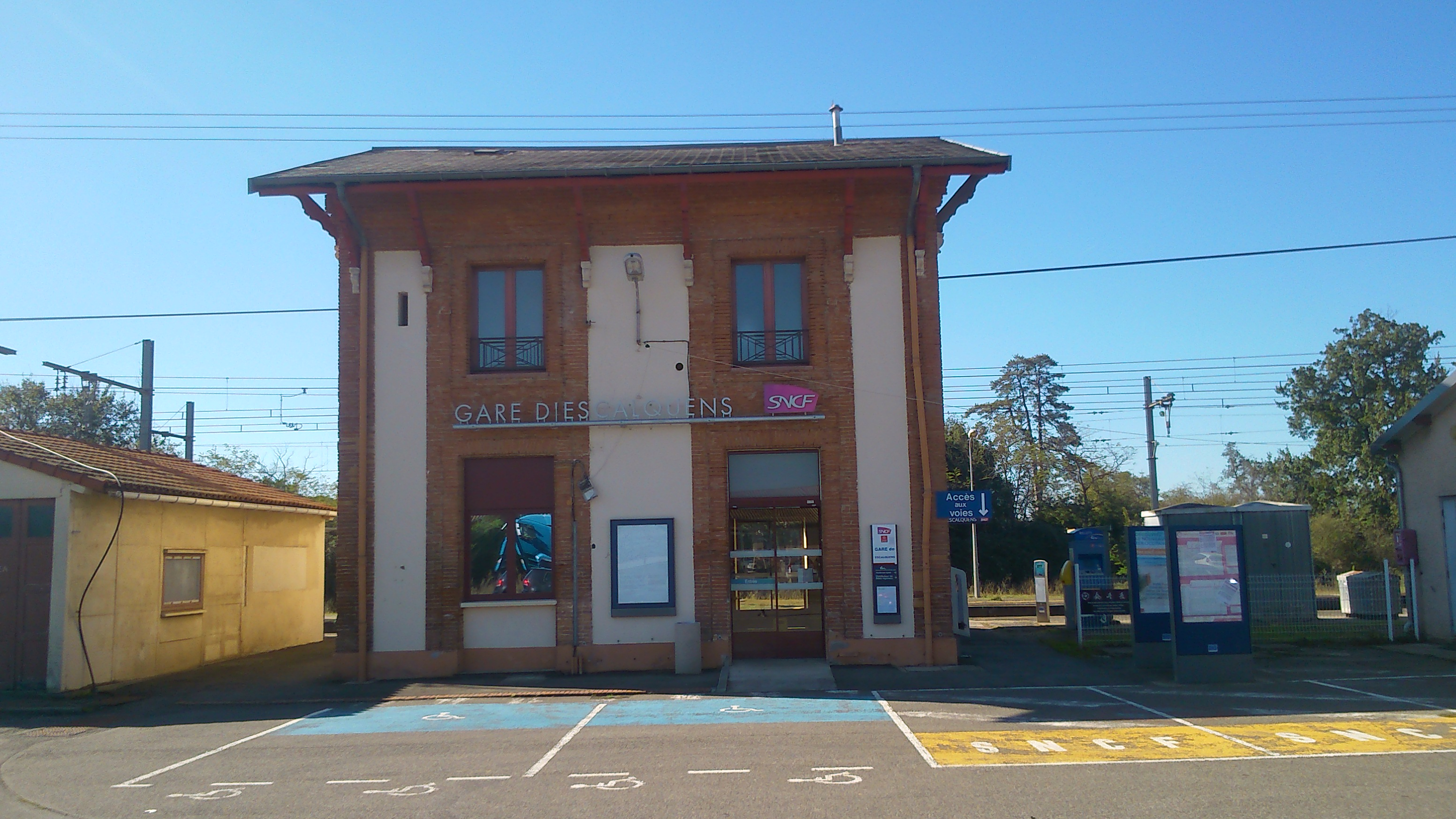
- Escalquens station

General information
- Location: Escalquens, Occitanie, France
- Coordinates: 43.51709°N 1.54227°E
- Line: Bordeaux–Sète railway

Other information
- Station code: 87611707

History
- Opened: 1857

Services
| Preceding station | TER Occitanie | Following station |
|---|---|---|
| Labège-Village towards Toulouse | 10 | Montlaur towards Narbonne |
| Baziège towards Portbou | 25 | Labège-Innopole towards Toulouse |
Location

Escalquens is a railway station in Escalquens, Occitanie, southern France. Within TER Occitanie, it is part of lines 10 (Toulouse–Narbonne) and 25 (Portbou–Toulouse).
