= Aureville =

- Commune
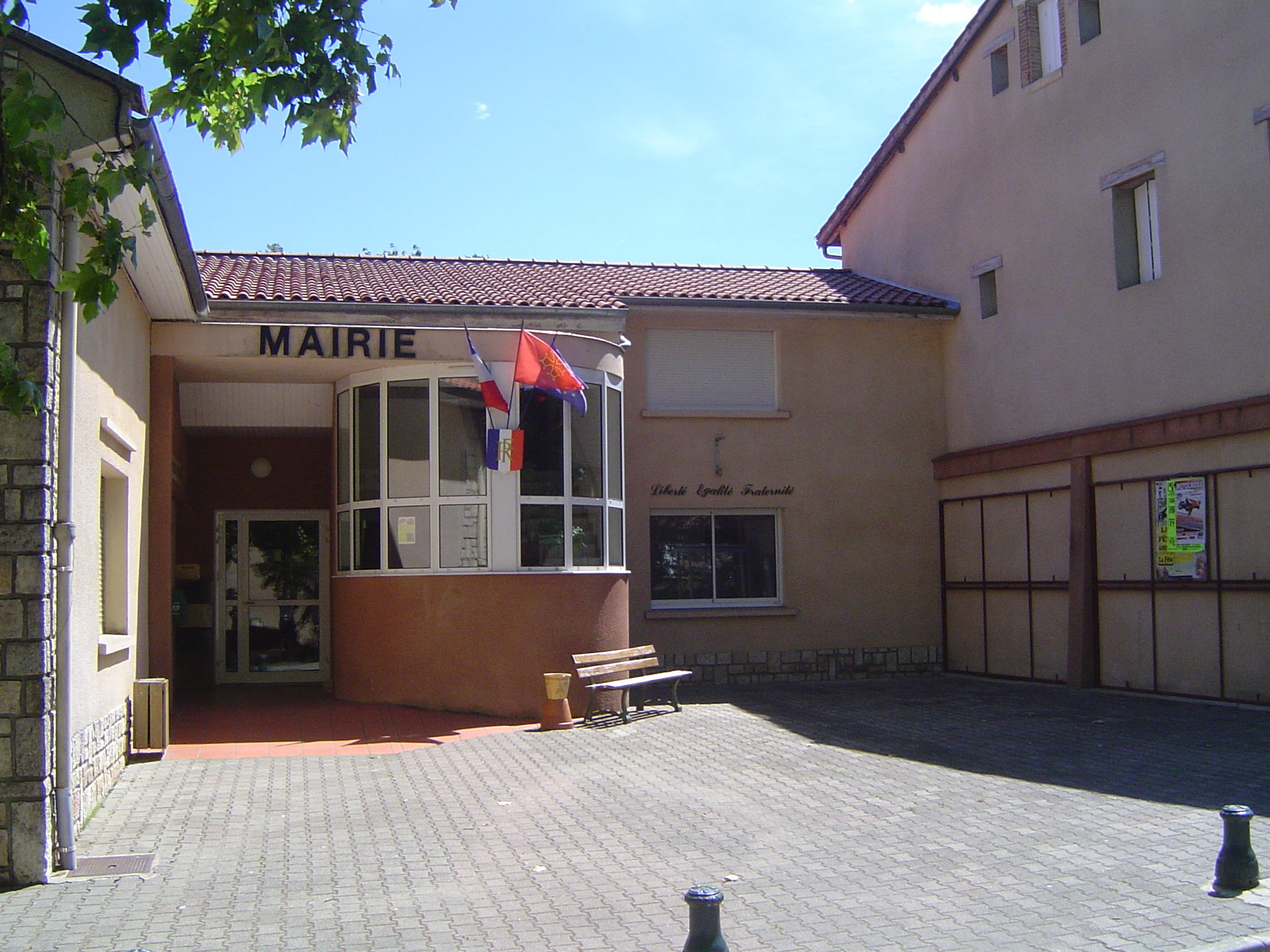
- Town hall

- Coat of arms
- Location of Aureville
- Location within France Location within Occitanie
- Coordinates: 43°28′57″N 1°27′12″E
- Country: France
- Region: Occitania
- Department: Haute-Garonne
- Arrondissement: Toulouse
- Canton: Castanet-Tolosan
- Intercommunality: CA Sicoval

Government
  - Mayor (2020–2026): Xavier Espic
- Area^{1}: 6.80 km^{2} (2.63 sq mi)
- Elevation: 140 m (460 ft)
- Highest elevation: 282 m (925 ft)
- Lowest elevation: 169 m (554 ft)
- Population (2023): 1,048
  - Density: 154/km^{2} (399/sq mi)
- Time zone: UTC+01:00 (CET)
  - Summer (DST): UTC+02:00 (CEST)
- INSEE/Postal code: 31025 /31320
- ^{1} French Land Register data, which excludes lakes, ponds, glaciers > 1 km^{2} (0.386 sq mi or 247 acres) and river estuaries.

Aureville (French pronunciation: [ɔʁvil]; Occitan: Aurevila) is a commune in the Haute-Garonne department in southwestern France.

== Population ==
Historical population
Year	Pop.	±% p.a.
1968	171	—
1975	241	+5.02%
1982	372	+6.40%
1990	455	+2.55%
1999	540	+1.92%
2007	705	+3.39%
2012	779	+2.02%
2017	899	+2.91%
2023	1,048	+2.59%
Source: INSEE

== See also ==
- Communes of the Haute-Garonne department
