= Goyrans =

- Commune
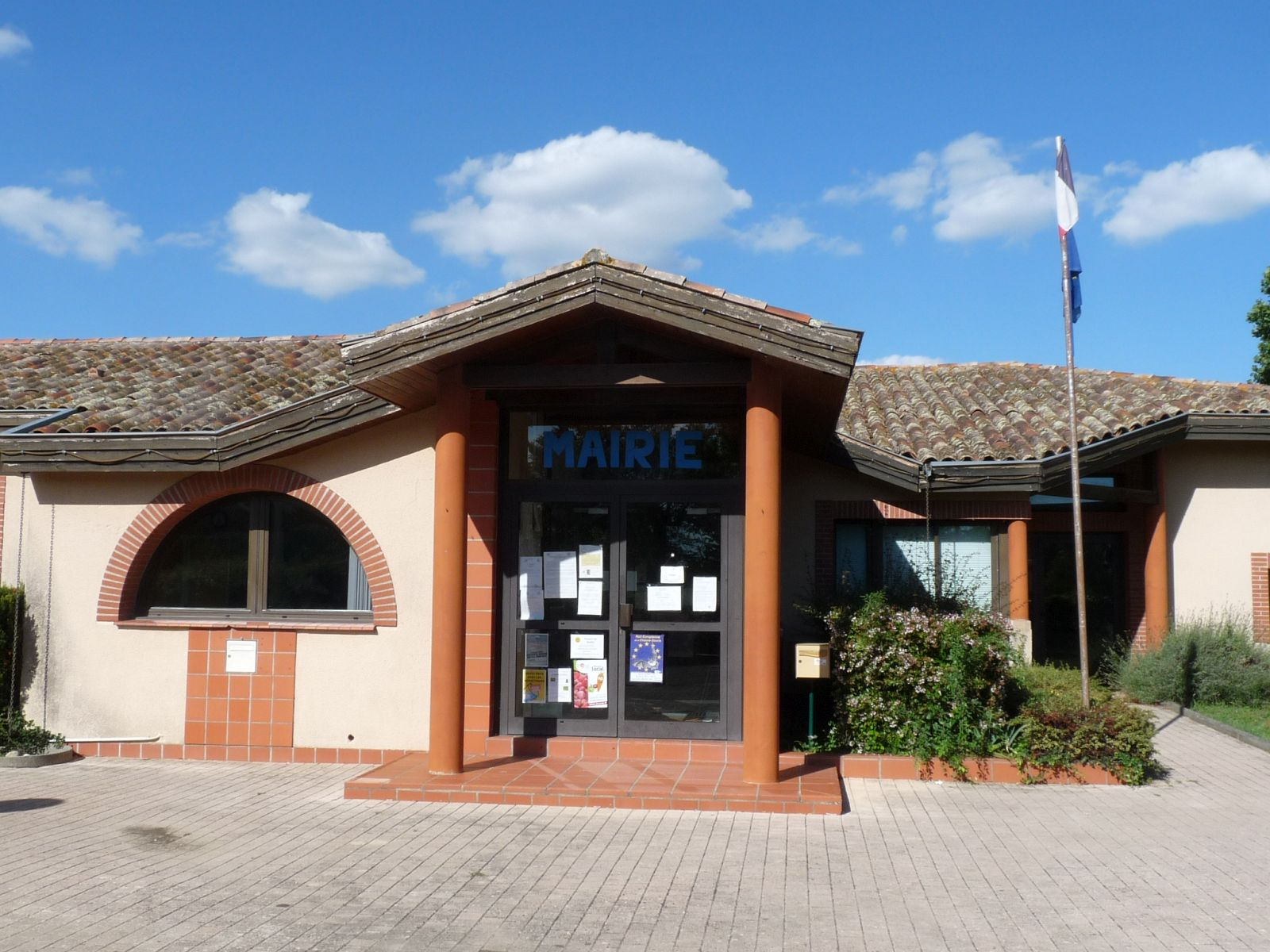
- The town hall in Goyrans

- Coat of arms
- Location of Goyrans
- Location within France Location within Occitanie
- Coordinates: 43°28′56″N 1°25′58″E
- Country: France
- Region: Occitania
- Department: Haute-Garonne
- Arrondissement: Toulouse
- Canton: Castanet-Tolosan
- Intercommunality: CA Sicoval

Government
  - Mayor (2020–2026): Véronique Haitce
- Area^{1}: 5.75 km^{2} (2.22 sq mi)
- Elevation: 272 m (892 ft)
- Highest elevation: 274 m (899 ft)
- Lowest elevation: 147 m (482 ft)
- Population (2023): 867
  - Density: 151/km^{2} (391/sq mi)
- Time zone: UTC+01:00 (CET)
  - Summer (DST): UTC+02:00 (CEST)
- INSEE/Postal code: 31227 /31120
- ^{1} French Land Register data, which excludes lakes, ponds, glaciers > 1 km^{2} (0.386 sq mi or 247 acres) and river estuaries.

Goyrans (French pronunciation: [ɡwaʁɑ̃]; Occitan: Goirans) is a commune in the Haute-Garonne department in southwestern France.

== Population ==
Historical population
| Year | Pop. | ±% p.a. |
|---|---|---|
| 1968 | 137 | — |
| 1975 | 226 | +7.41% |
| 1982 | 417 | +9.15% |
| 1990 | 539 | +3.26% |
| 1999 | 809 | +4.62% |
| 2007 | 859 | +0.75% |
| 2012 | 905 | +1.05% |
| 2017 | 843 | −1.41% |
| 2023 | 867 | +0.47% |
Source: INSEE

== See also ==
- Communes of the Haute-Garonne department
