= Auzeville-Tolosane =

- Commune
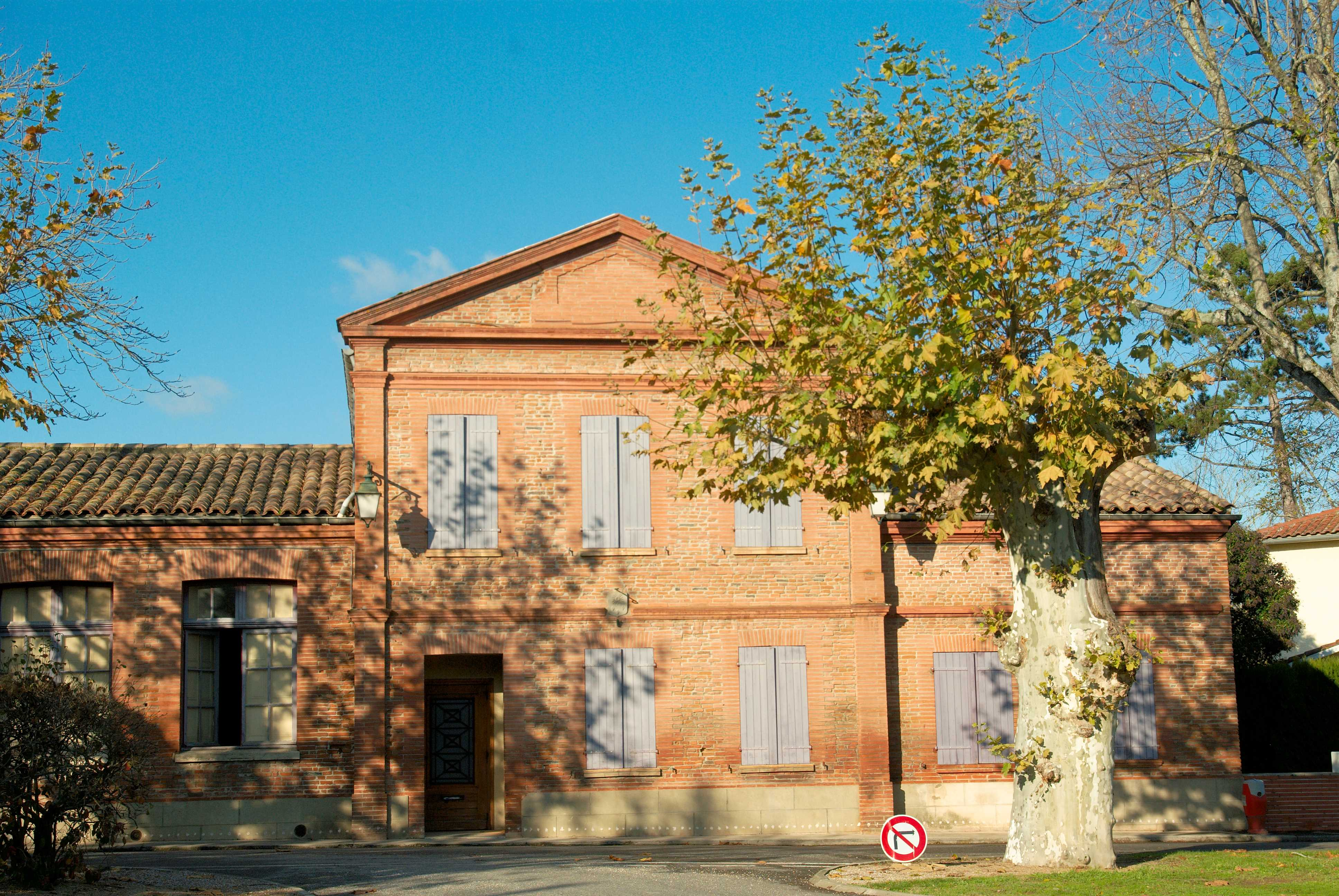
- Town hall

- Coat of arms
- Location of Auzeville-Tolosane
- Location within France Location within Occitanie
- Coordinates: 43°31′42″N 1°28′56″E
- Country: France
- Region: Occitania
- Department: Haute-Garonne
- Arrondissement: Toulouse
- Canton: Castanet-Tolosan
- Intercommunality: CA Sicoval

Government
  - Mayor (2020–2026): Dominique Lagarde
- Area^{1}: 6.66 km^{2} (2.57 sq mi)
- Elevation: 167 m (548 ft)
- Highest elevation: 272 m (892 ft)
- Lowest elevation: 142 m (466 ft)
- Population (2023): 4,665
  - Density: 700/km^{2} (1,810/sq mi)
- Time zone: UTC+01:00 (CET)
  - Summer (DST): UTC+02:00 (CEST)
- INSEE/Postal code: 31035 /31320
- ^{1} French Land Register data, which excludes lakes, ponds, glaciers > 1 km^{2} (0.386 sq mi or 247 acres) and river estuaries.

Auzeville-Tolosane (French pronunciation: [ozvil tɔlozan]; Occitan: Ausevila Tolosana) is a commune in the Haute-Garonne department in the Occitanie region in southwestern France.

== Population ==
The inhabitants are called Auzevillois.

Historical population
Year	Pop.	±% p.a.
1968	491	—
1975	1,073	+11.82%
1982	1,808	+7.74%
1990	2,000	+1.27%
1999	2,202	+1.07%
2007	2,816	+3.12%
2012	3,535	+4.65%
2017	4,126	+3.14%
2023	4,665	+2.07%
Source: INSEE

== International relations ==
It is twinned with :

- Broughton, Wales
- Călugăreni, Romania

== See also ==
- Communes of the Haute-Garonne department
