= Lacroix-Falgarde =

- Commune
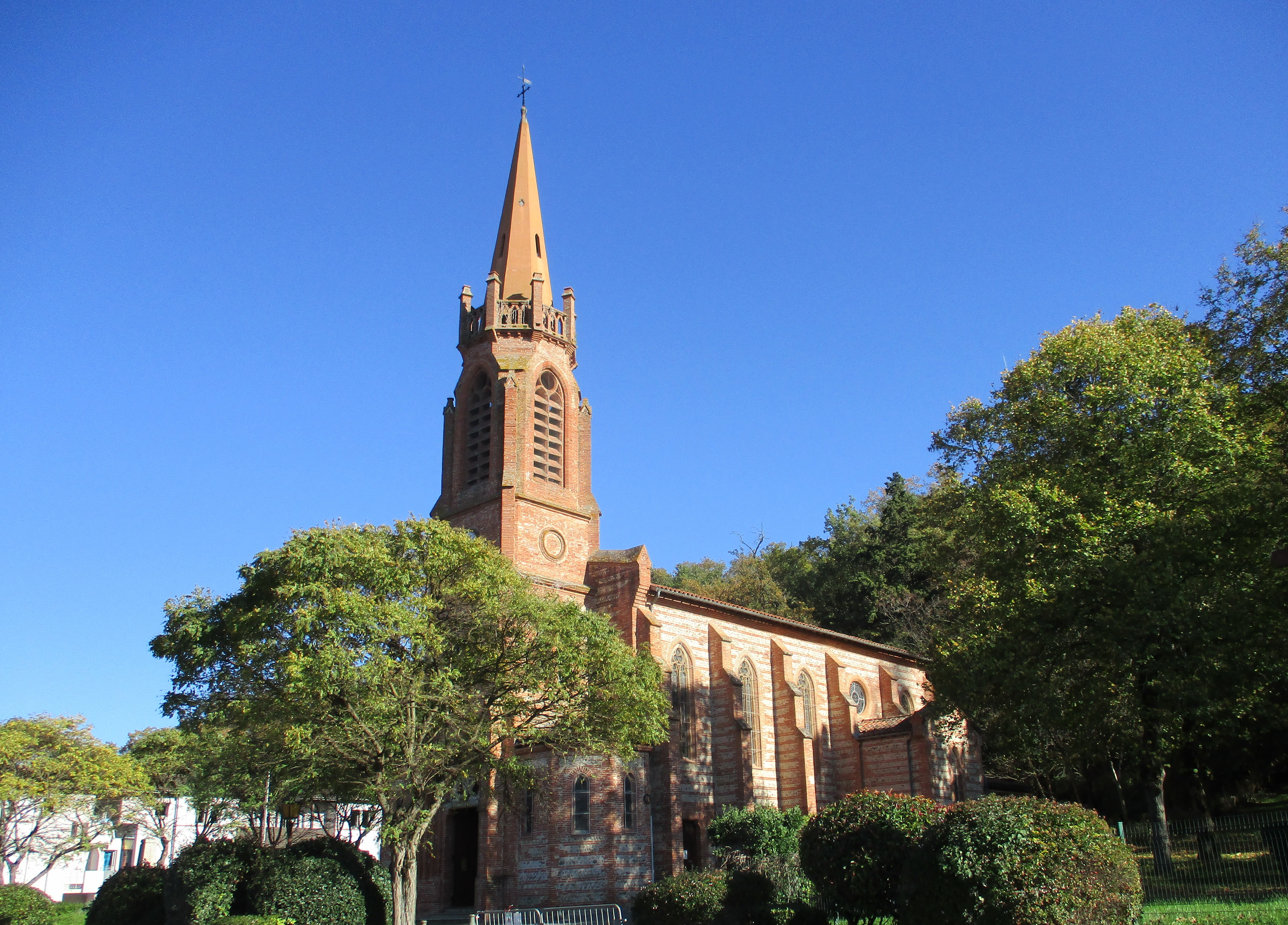
- The church in Lacroix-Falgarde

- Coat of arms
- Location of Lacroix-Falgarde
- Location within France Location within Occitanie
- Coordinates: 43°30′00″N 1°24′37″E
- Country: France
- Region: Occitania
- Department: Haute-Garonne
- Arrondissement: Toulouse
- Canton: Castanet-Tolosan
- Intercommunality: CA Sicoval

Government
  - Mayor (2020–2026): Jean-Daniel Marty
- Area^{1}: 6.09 km^{2} (2.35 sq mi)
- Elevation: 154 m (505 ft)
- Highest elevation: 254 m (833 ft)
- Lowest elevation: 146 m (479 ft)
- Population (2023): 2,030
  - Density: 333/km^{2} (863/sq mi)
- Time zone: UTC+01:00 (CET)
  - Summer (DST): UTC+02:00 (CEST)
- INSEE/Postal code: 31259 /31120
- ^{1} French Land Register data, which excludes lakes, ponds, glaciers > 1 km^{2} (0.386 sq mi or 247 acres) and river estuaries.

Lacroix-Falgarde (French pronunciation: [lakʁwa falɡaʁd]; Occitan: La Crotz e Falgarda) is a commune in the Haute-Garonne department in southwestern France.

== Population ==
Historical population

Year	Pop.	±% p.a.
1793	341	—
1821	386	+0.44%
1846	421	+0.35%
1872	348	−0.73%
1901	294	−0.58%
1926	248	−0.68%
1946	282	+0.64%
1962	370	+1.71%
1968	415	+1.93%

Year	Pop.	±% p.a.
1975	625	+6.02%
1982	1,148	+9.07%
1990	1,478	+3.21%
1999	1,485	+0.05%
2007	1,928	+3.32%
2012	2,055	+1.28%
2017	2,068	+0.13%
2023	2,030	−0.31%

Source: EHESS and INSEE (1968-2023)

== See also ==
Communes of the Haute-Garonne department

== Transportation ==
Residents and visitors can use the on-demand transportation line 119 (TAD 119) operated by Tisseo.
