= Péchabou =

- Commune
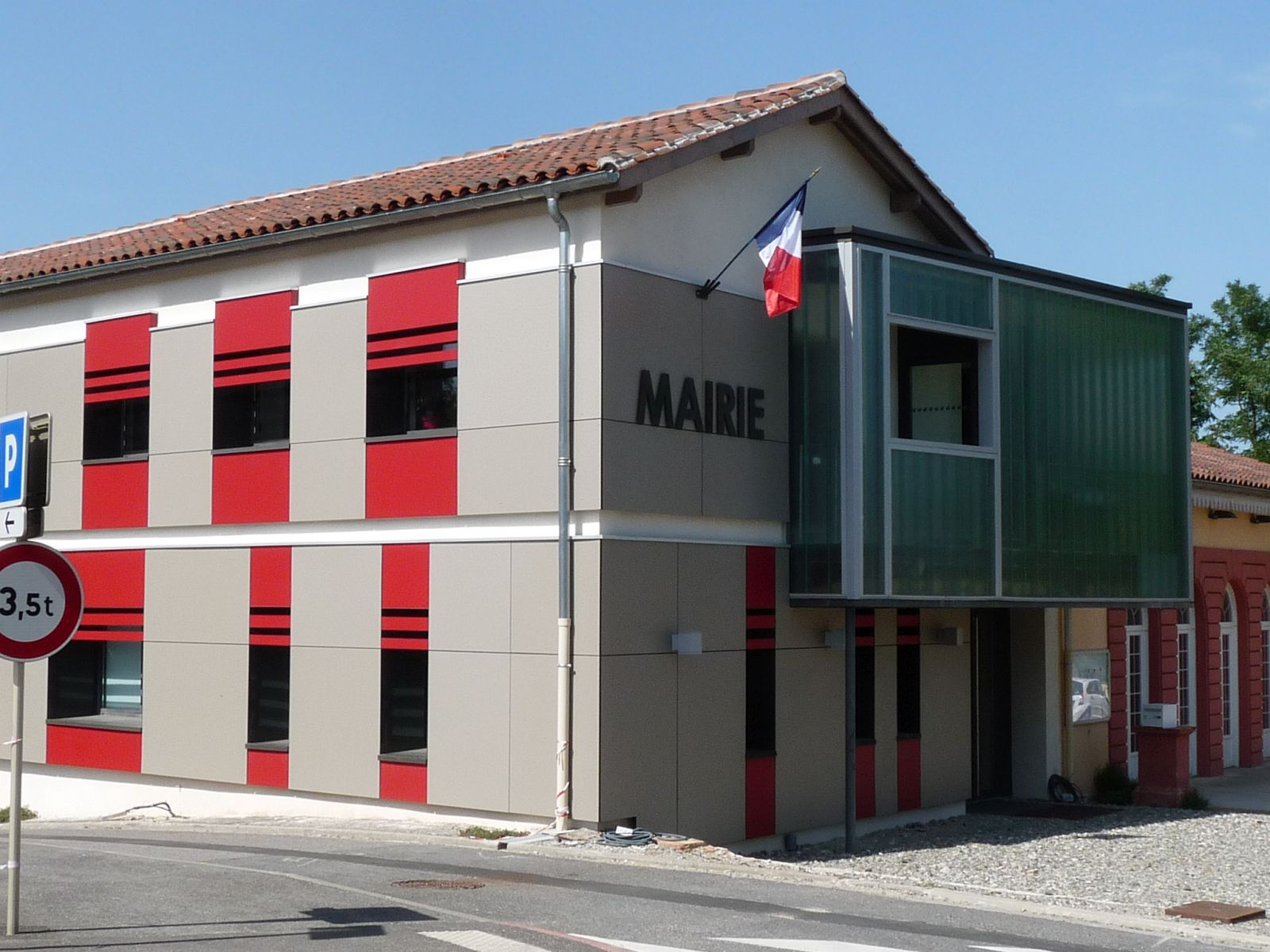
- The town hall in Péchabou

- Coat of arms
- Location of Péchabou
- Location within France Location within Occitanie
- Coordinates: 43°30′07″N 1°30′32″E
- Country: France
- Region: Occitania
- Department: Haute-Garonne
- Arrondissement: Toulouse
- Canton: Castanet-Tolosan
- Intercommunality: CA Sicoval

Government
  - Mayor (2020–2026): Dominique Sangay
- Area^{1}: 3.57 km^{2} (1.38 sq mi)
- Elevation: 180 m (590 ft)
- Highest elevation: 261 m (856 ft)
- Lowest elevation: 148 m (486 ft)
- Population (2023): 2,449
  - Density: 686/km^{2} (1,780/sq mi)
- Time zone: UTC+01:00 (CET)
  - Summer (DST): UTC+02:00 (CEST)
- INSEE/Postal code: 31409 /31320
- ^{1} French Land Register data, which excludes lakes, ponds, glaciers > 1 km^{2} (0.386 sq mi or 247 acres) and river estuaries.

Péchabou (French pronunciation: [peʃabu]; Occitan: Pujabon) is a commune in the Haute-Garonne department in southwestern France, Occitanie. The inhabitants are called the Pechabolites and the Pechabolites.

== Population ==
Historical population
Year	Pop.	±% p.a.
1968	284	—
1975	513	+8.81%
1982	663	+3.73%
1990	1,023	+5.57%
1999	1,299	+2.69%
2007	1,608	+2.70%
2012	1,962	+4.06%
2017	2,330	+3.50%
2023	2,449	+0.83%
Source: INSEE

== See also ==
- Communes of the Haute-Garonne department
