= Labège-Innopole station =

Railway station in Labège, France

Labège-Innopole
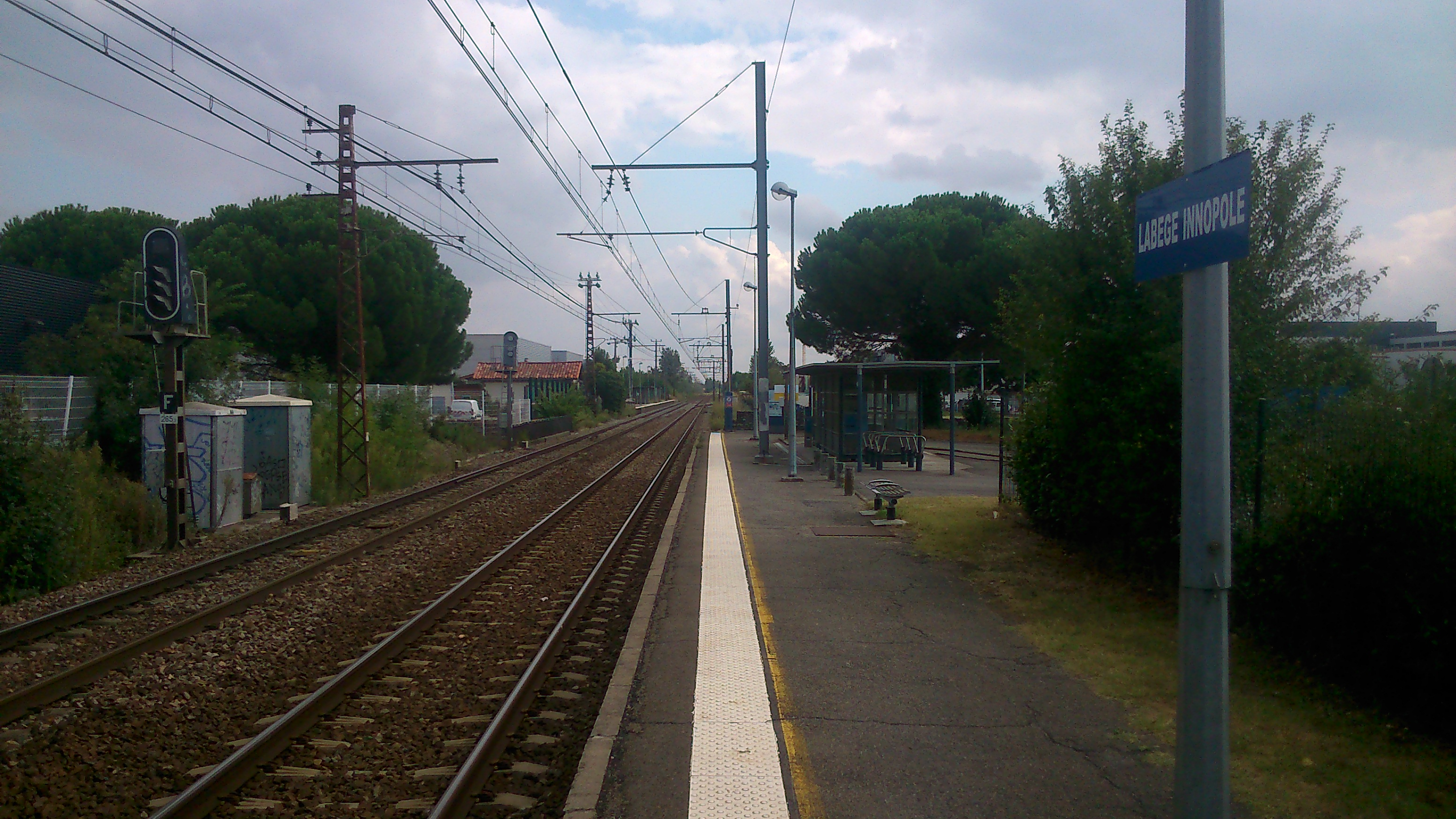
- Labège-Innopole Station

General information
- Location: Labège, Occitanie, France
- Coordinates: 43.54745°N 1.5129°E
- Line: Bordeaux–Sète railway

Other information
- Station code: 87612002

Services
Preceding station	TER Occitanie	Following station
Montaudran towards Toulouse	10	Labège-Village towards Narbonne
Escalquens towards Portbou	25	Montaudran towards Toulouse
Location

Labège-Innopole is a railway station in Labège, Occitanie, southern France. Within TER Occitanie, it is part of lines 10 (Toulouse–Narbonne) and 25 (Portbou–Toulouse).
