= Mervilla =

- Commune
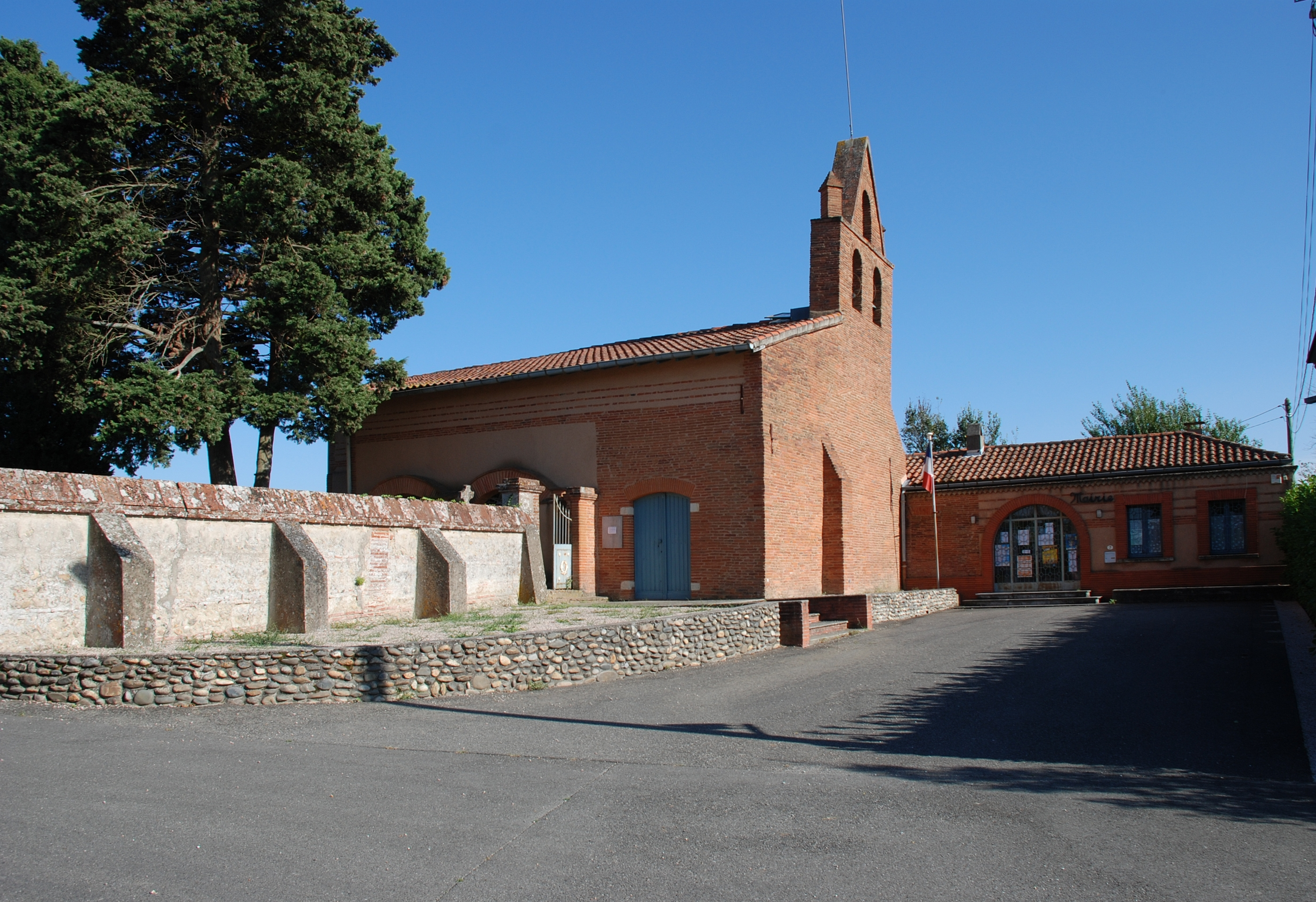
- The church in Mervilla

- Coat of arms
- Location of Mervilla
- Location within France Location within Occitanie
- Coordinates: 43°30′30″N 1°28′26″E
- Country: France
- Region: Occitania
- Department: Haute-Garonne
- Arrondissement: Toulouse
- Canton: Castanet-Tolosan
- Intercommunality: CA Sicoval

Government
  - Mayor (2020–2026): Gérard Gardelle
- Area^{1}: 2.76 km^{2} (1.07 sq mi)
- Elevation: 260 m (850 ft)
- Highest elevation: 275 m (902 ft)
- Lowest elevation: 185 m (607 ft)
- Population (2023): 303
  - Density: 110/km^{2} (284/sq mi)
- Time zone: UTC+01:00 (CET)
  - Summer (DST): UTC+02:00 (CEST)
- INSEE/Postal code: 31340 /31320
- ^{1} French Land Register data, which excludes lakes, ponds, glaciers > 1 km^{2} (0.386 sq mi or 247 acres) and river estuaries.

Mervilla (French pronunciation: [mɛʁvila]; Occitan: Mervilar) is a commune in the Haute-Garonne department in southwestern France.

== Population ==
Historical population
Year	Pop.	±% p.a.
1968	65	—
1975	112	+8.08%
1982	101	−1.47%
1990	124	+2.60%
1999	172	+3.70%
2007	247	+4.63%
2012	263	+1.26%
2017	269	+0.45%
2023	303	+2.00%
Source: INSEE

== See also ==
- Communes of the Haute-Garonne department
