= Rebigue =

- Commune
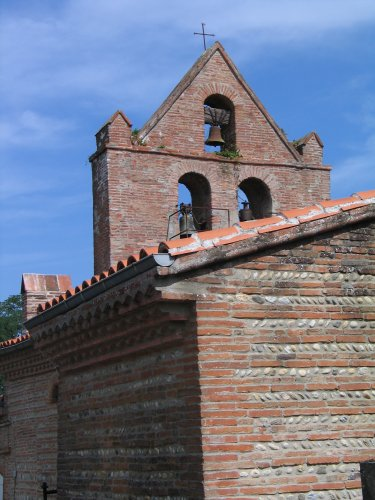
- The church in Rebigue

- Coat of arms
- Location of Rebigue
- Location within France Location within Occitanie
- Coordinates: 43°29′23″N 1°28′55″E
- Country: France
- Region: Occitania
- Department: Haute-Garonne
- Arrondissement: Toulouse
- Canton: Castanet-Tolosan
- Intercommunality: CA Sicoval

Government
  - Mayor (2020–2026): Jacques Charrie
- Area^{1}: 5.16 km^{2} (1.99 sq mi)
- Elevation: 250 m (820 ft)
- Highest elevation: 281 m (922 ft)
- Lowest elevation: 182 m (597 ft)
- Population (2023): 505
  - Density: 97.9/km^{2} (253/sq mi)
- Time zone: UTC+01:00 (CET)
  - Summer (DST): UTC+02:00 (CEST)
- INSEE/Postal code: 31448 /31320
- ^{1} French Land Register data, which excludes lakes, ponds, glaciers > 1 km^{2} (0.386 sq mi or 247 acres) and river estuaries.

Rebigue (French pronunciation: [ʁəbiɡ]; Occitan: Rebiga) is a commune in the Haute-Garonne department in southwestern France.

== Population ==
Historical population
Year	Pop.	±% p.a.
1968	118	—
1975	223	+9.52%
1982	317	+5.15%
1990	355	+1.43%
1999	444	+2.52%
2007	507	+1.67%
2012	507	+0.00%
2017	478	−1.17%
2023	505	+0.92%
Source: INSEE

== See also ==
- Communes of the Haute-Garonne department
