= Escalquens =

- Commune
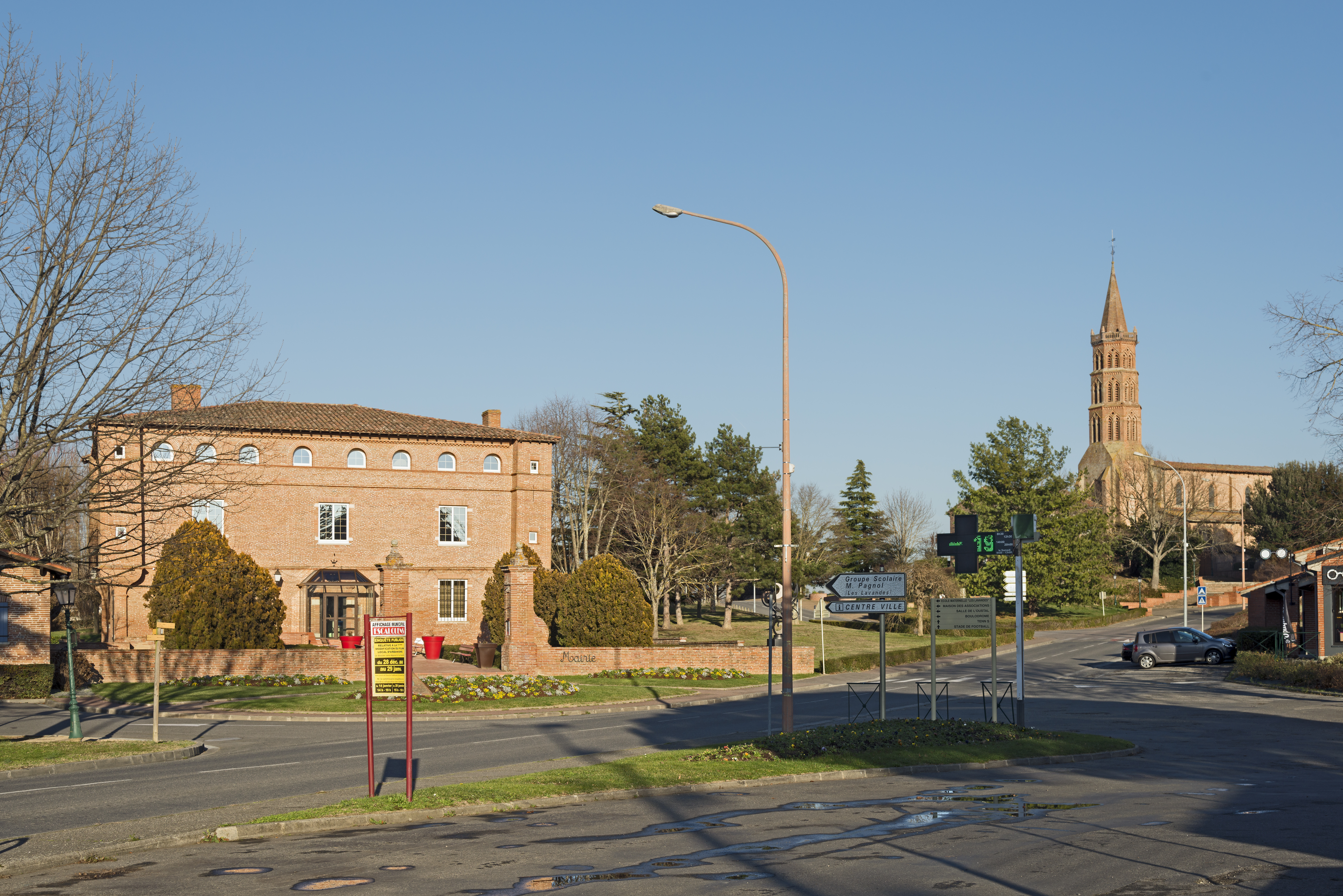
- The town hall and church in Escalquens

- Coat of arms
- Location of Escalquens
- Location within France Location within Occitanie
- Coordinates: 43°31′07″N 1°33′42″E
- Country: France
- Region: Occitania
- Department: Haute-Garonne
- Arrondissement: Toulouse
- Canton: Escalquens
- Intercommunality: CA Sicoval

Government
  - Mayor (2020–2026): Jean-Luc Tronco
- Area^{1}: 8.42 km^{2} (3.25 sq mi)
- Elevation: 157 m (515 ft)
- Highest elevation: 232 m (761 ft)
- Lowest elevation: 146 m (479 ft)
- Population (2023): 6,924
  - Density: 822/km^{2} (2,130/sq mi)
- Time zone: UTC+01:00 (CET)
  - Summer (DST): UTC+02:00 (CEST)
- INSEE/Postal code: 31169 /31750
- ^{1} French Land Register data, which excludes lakes, ponds, glaciers > 1 km^{2} (0.386 sq mi or 247 acres) and river estuaries.

Escalquens (French pronunciation: [ɛskalkɛ̃s]) is a commune in the Haute-Garonne department in southwestern France. Escalquens station has rail connections to Toulouse, Carcassonne and Narbonne.

== Population ==
Historical population
Year	Pop.	±% p.a.
1968	896	—
1975	2,051	+12.56%
1982	2,884	+4.99%
1990	4,323	+5.19%
1999	5,477	+2.66%
2007	5,685	+0.47%
2012	6,124	+1.50%
2017	6,660	+1.69%
2023	6,924	+0.65%
Source: INSEE

== Monuments ==
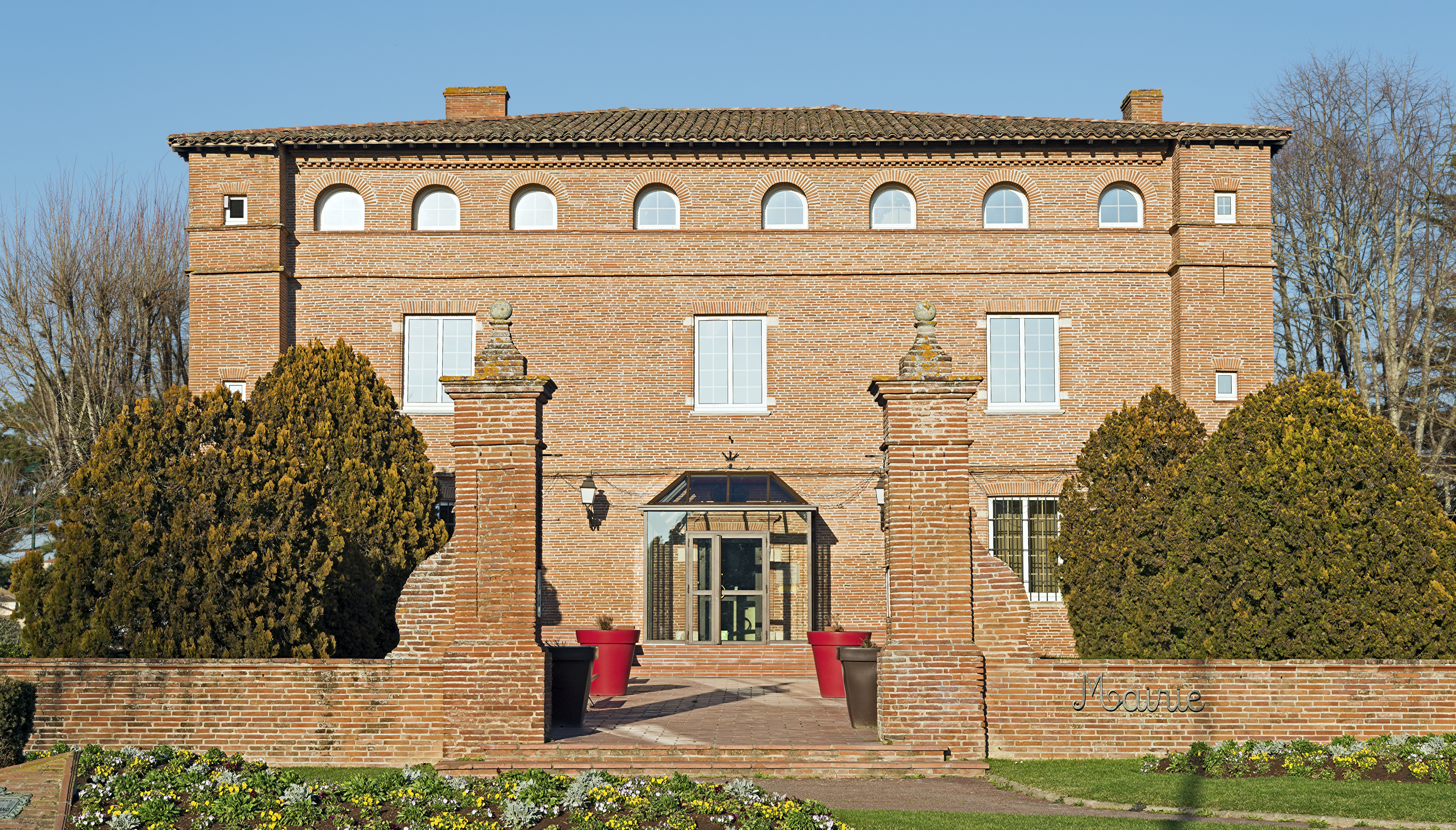
The town hall.

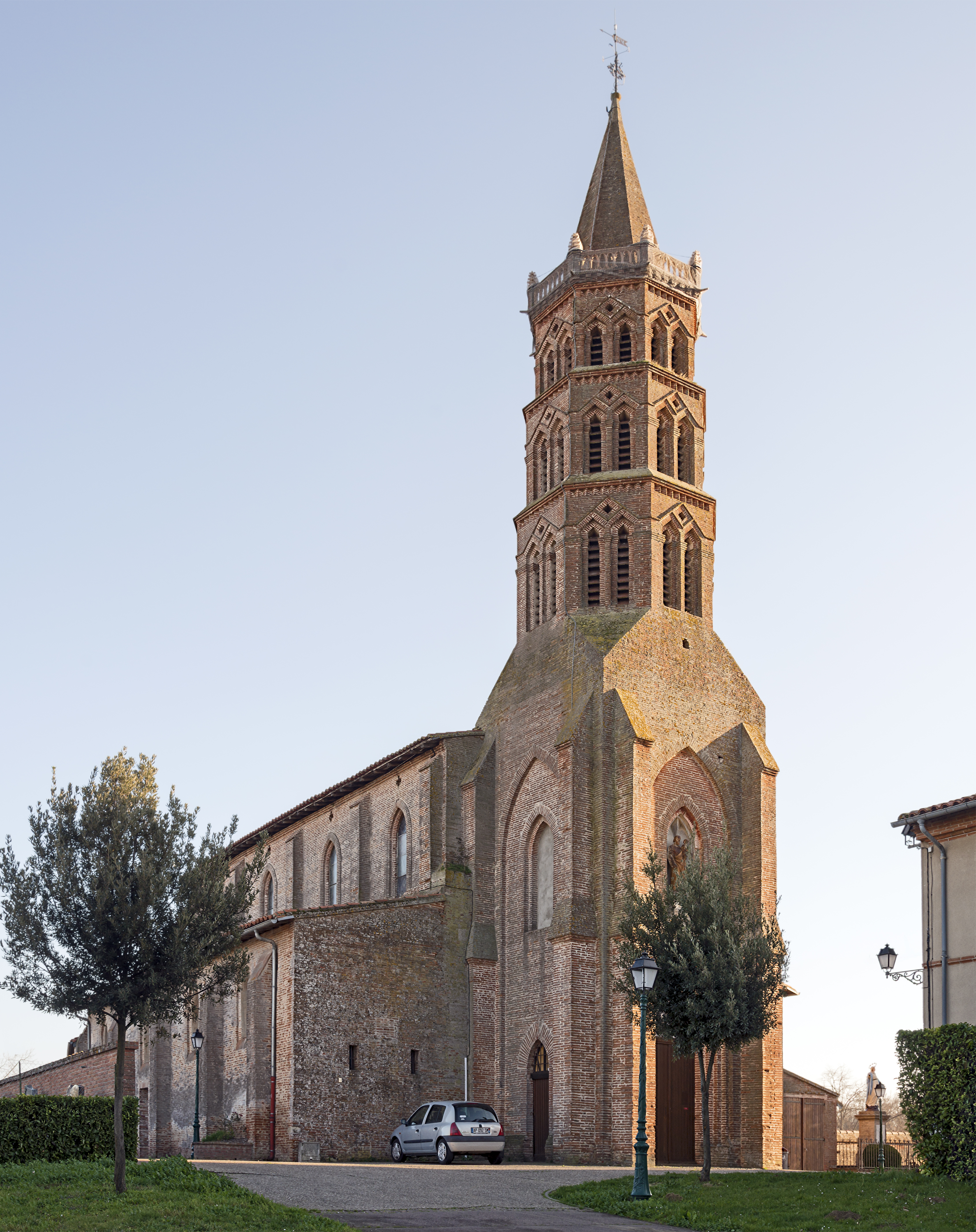
The church St.Martin.

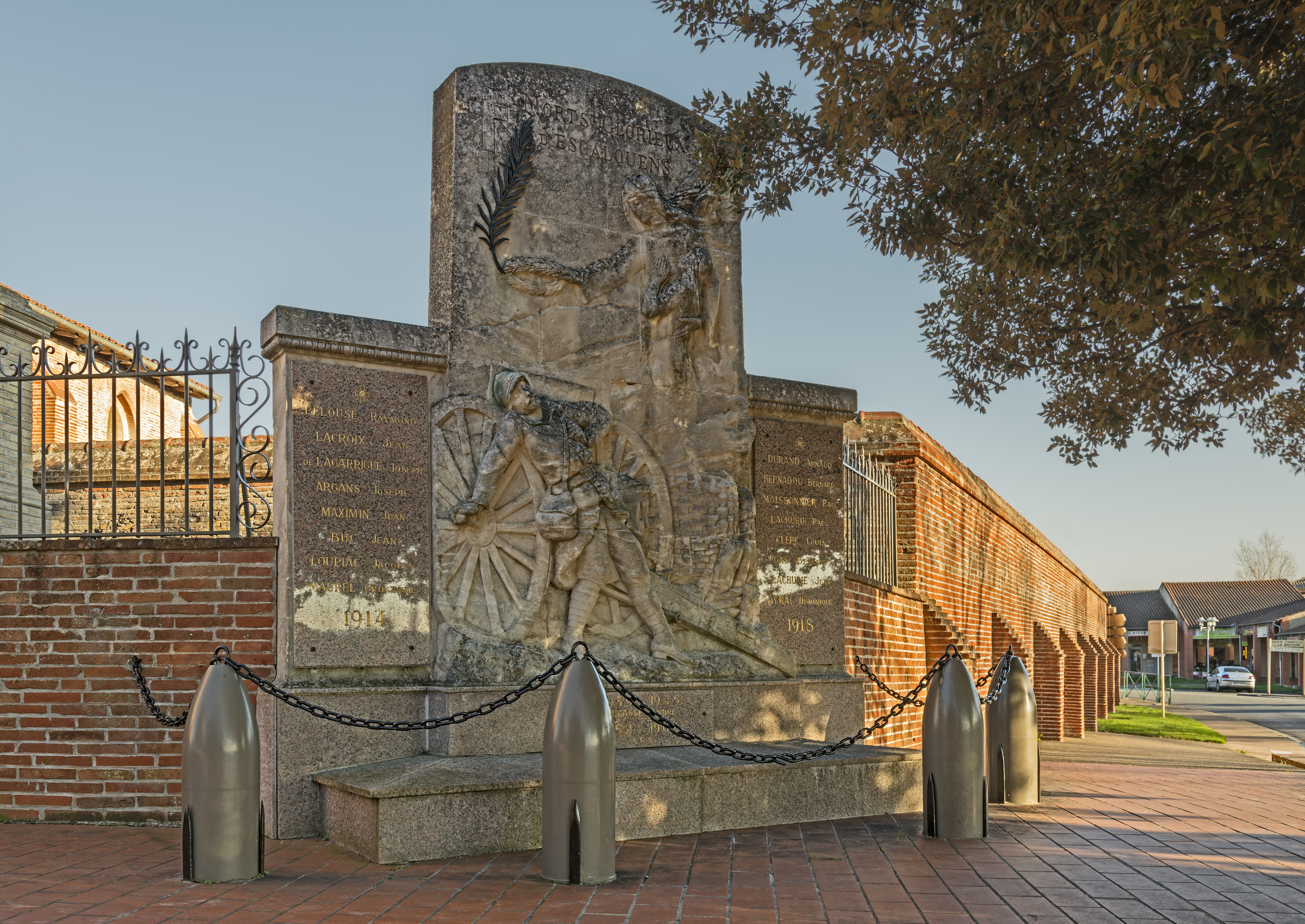
The war memorial.

== See also ==
- Communes of the Haute-Garonne department
