= Saint-Orens-de-Gameville =

- Commune
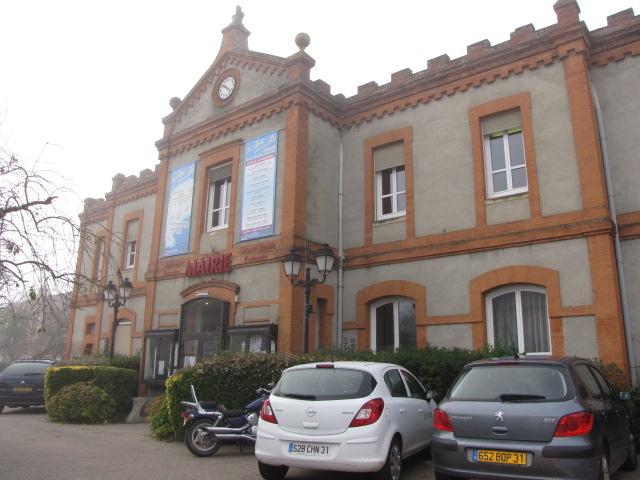
- Town hall

- Coat of arms
- Location of Saint-Orens-de-Gameville
- Location within France Location within Occitanie
- Coordinates: 43°33′06″N 1°32′02″E
- Country: France
- Region: Occitania
- Department: Haute-Garonne
- Arrondissement: Toulouse
- Canton: Castanet-Tolosan
- Intercommunality: Toulouse Métropole

Government
  - Mayor (2025–2026): Dominique Faure
- Area^{1}: 13.06 km^{2} (5.04 sq mi)
- Elevation: 190 m (620 ft)
- Highest elevation: 219 m (719 ft)
- Lowest elevation: 144 m (472 ft)
- Population (2023): 14,646
  - Density: 1,121/km^{2} (2,905/sq mi)
- Time zone: UTC+01:00 (CET)
  - Summer (DST): UTC+02:00 (CEST)
- INSEE/Postal code: 31506 /31650
- ^{1} French Land Register data, which excludes lakes, ponds, glaciers > 1 km^{2} (0.386 sq mi or 247 acres) and river estuaries.

Saint-Orens-de-Gameville (French pronunciation: [sɛ̃tɔʁɛ̃s də ɡamvil], Occitan: Sent Orenç de Gamevila), also referred to as Saint-Orens, is a commune in the Haute-Garonne department, administrative region of Occitania, southwestern France.

== Population ==
The inhabitants of the commune are known as Saint-Orennais in French.

Historical population

Year	Pop.	±% p.a.
1793	385	—
1800	451	+2.29%
1806	490	+1.39%
1821	554	+0.82%
1831	607	+0.92%
1836	687	+2.51%
1841	746	+1.66%
1846	704	−1.15%
1851	676	−0.81%
1856	570	−3.35%
1861	588	+0.62%
1866	677	+2.86%
1872	570	−2.83%
1876	596	+1.12%
1881	600	+0.13%
1886	589	−0.37%
1891	592	+0.10%
1896	609	+0.57%
1901	631	+0.71%

Year	Pop.	±% p.a.
1906	597	−1.10%
1911	620	+0.76%
1921	584	−0.60%
1926	589	+0.17%
1931	611	+0.74%
1936	687	+2.37%
1946	667	−0.30%
1954	674	+0.13%
1962	815	+2.40%
1968	1,349	+8.76%
1975	4,738	+19.66%
1982	7,638	+7.06%
1990	9,703	+3.04%
1999	10,991	+1.39%
2007	10,717	−0.32%
2012	11,122	+0.74%
2017	11,830	+1.24%
2023	14,646	+3.62%

Source: EHESS and INSEE (1968-2023)

== See also ==
- Communes of the Haute-Garonne department
