= Vieille-Toulouse =

- Commune
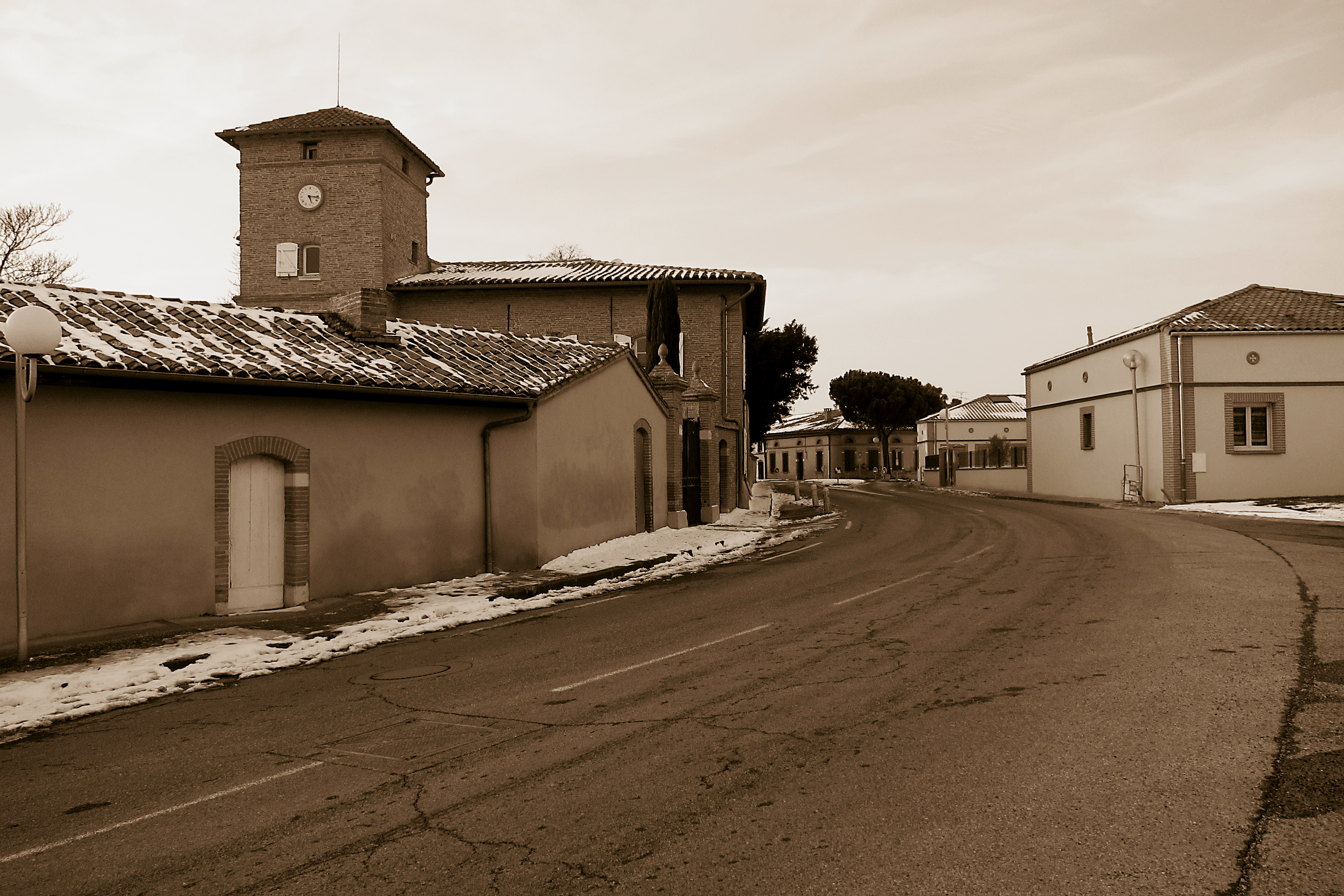

- Coat of arms
- Location of Vieille-Toulouse
- Location within France Location within Occitanie
- Coordinates: 43°31′32″N 1°26′49″E
- Country: France
- Region: Occitania
- Department: Haute-Garonne
- Arrondissement: Toulouse
- Canton: Castanet-Tolosan
- Intercommunality: CA Sicoval

Government
  - Mayor (2026–32): Marianne Boccacino
- Area^{1}: 5.53 km^{2} (2.14 sq mi)
- Elevation: 269 m (883 ft)
- Highest elevation: 266 m (873 ft)
- Lowest elevation: 141 m (463 ft)
- Population (2023): 1,230
  - Density: 222/km^{2} (576/sq mi)
- Time zone: UTC+01:00 (CET)
  - Summer (DST): UTC+02:00 (CEST)
- INSEE/Postal code: 31575 /31320
- ^{1} French Land Register data, which excludes lakes, ponds, glaciers > 1 km^{2} (0.386 sq mi or 247 acres) and river estuaries.

Vieille-Toulouse (French pronunciation: [vjɛj tuluz]; Occitan: Vièlha Tolosa) is a commune in the Haute-Garonne department in the Occitania region in southwestern France. It is located 9 kilometers south of Toulouse.

Historically and culturally, the commune is located in the Lauragais region.

As of 2024, it has a population of 1,250, experiencing population growth since 1962 and significant new home construction.

As of 2024, it was the 15th wealthiest municipality in France ranked by average monthly income at 9095 € per month. The commune today consists primarily of luxury housing.

== History ==
=== Gallic period Oppidum ===
From the inception of the site, it was the main exchange hub on the Isthmus. The settlement was developed from 175-150 BC and underwent several phases of urbanisation. It is estimated that the area of settlement was between 90-100 hectares, one of the largest in southern Gaul.

The Gallic oppidum was situated on the steep banks of the Garonne and an earthen rampart, at the confluence Ariège and Garonne rivers—forming an 8-kilometer-long enclosure that encompassed a trapezoidal area of 300 hectares. The site thus defined spanned three spurs sloping toward the Garonne, separated by two small valleys that opened onto the riverbank. Six large earthen mounds (cavaliers) were distributed along the perimeter of the enclosure, fronted by wide ditch.

From the 3rd century onwards, it was occupied by the Volcae Tectosages. The location became Tolosa Tectosagum, a bustling settlement featuring artisan workshops, two temples, and significant trade connections—particularly regarding wine imported from Italy.

=== Roman settlement ===
The Romans settled the area in the 1st century BC and turned it into an emporium, a trading post where coins and goods from across Europe circulated. Around 10 BC, the site was abandoned in favour of the new Roman city located where Toulouse's city center stands today. Researchers reckon the site was abandoned due to the rugged topography, which was difficult to build an urban layout on, and because reaching the water supply was difficult, as the perennial water table was located several tens of meters below the surface.

From the early 2000s, Rescue archaeology was conducted on plots of land. The National Insititue for Preventive Archaeological Research of France conducted two excavations.

=== Modern day ===
The commune's legal status was established on 1 January 1978. The amount of houses grew from 83 in 1968 to 551 in 2023. The development has been shaped by a land use plan of 1 to 2 houses per hectare.

== Population ==
Historical population
Year	Pop.	±% p.a.
1968	255	—
1975	565	+12.04%
1982	727	+3.67%
1990	867	+2.23%
1999	894	+0.34%
2007	1,063	+2.19%
2012	1,135	+1.32%
2017	1,169	+0.59%
2023	1,230	+0.85%
Source: INSEE

== Politics and administration ==
In the 2026 municipal elections, Pour Vieille-Toulouse avec vous, translated as "For Old-Toulouse with you", led by Marianne Boccacino, received 403 votes and was awarded 12 municipal seats and 1 community council seat. The opposition party "Fidèles à Vieille-Toulouse", translated as "Loyal to Old-Tolouse", received 341 votes and won 3 municipal seats and no community seat.

== Transport ==
The main access route from Toulouse is the RD4. No fixed route bus public transport serves the town. A transport-on-demand service, TAD 119 is operated by Tisséo to connect with Line B at Ramonville station. A school bus system operated by the Haute-Garonne department takes students to Toulouse.

== See also ==
- Communes of the Haute-Garonne department
