= Călugăreni, Prahova =

Călugăreni
- Commune
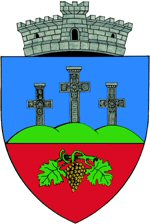
- Coat of arms

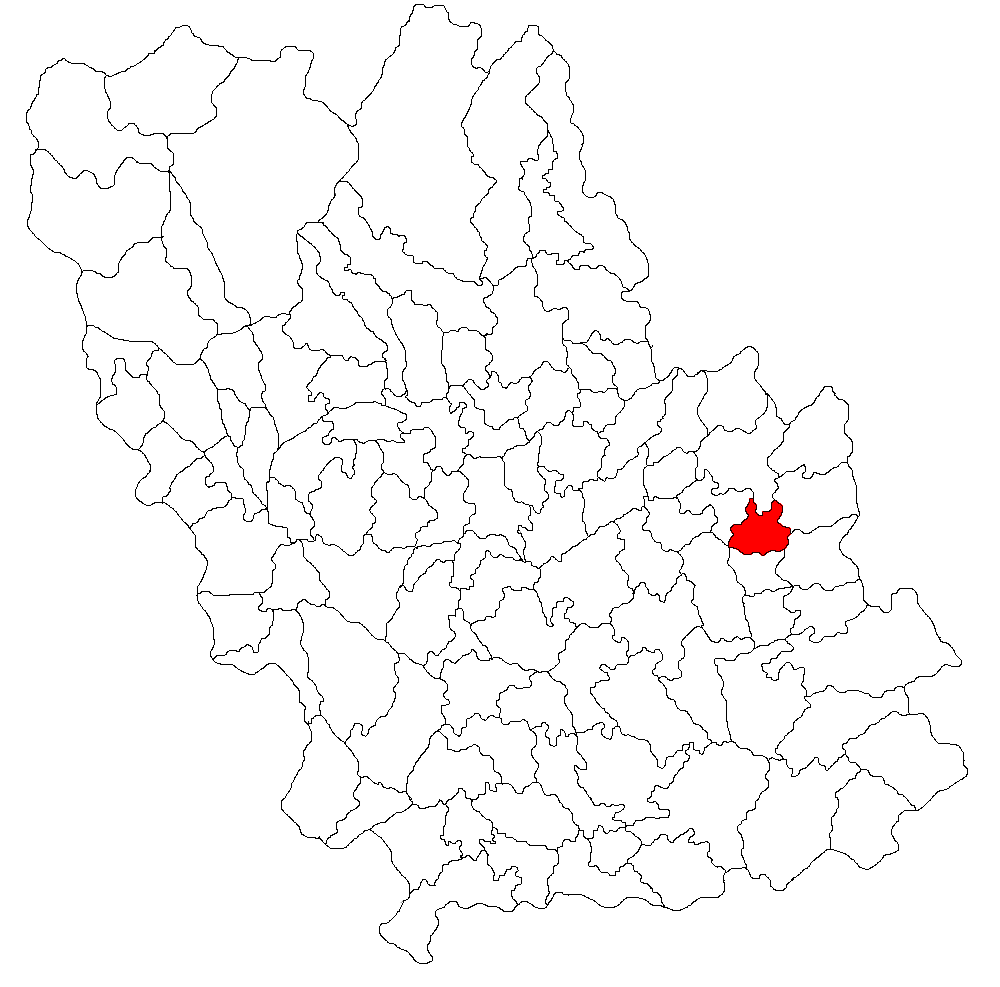
- Location in Prahova County

- Location in Romania
- Coordinates: 45°5′N 26°23′E
- Country: Romania
- County: Prahova

Government
  - Mayor (2024–2028): Ion Enache (PSD)
- Elevation: 384 m (1,260 ft)
- Population (2021-12-01): 1,013
- Time zone: EET/EEST (UTC+2/+3)
- Postal code: 107115
- Area code: +(40) 244
- Vehicle reg.: PH
- Website: www.primaria-calugareni.ro

Călugăreni is a commune in Prahova County, Muntenia, Romania. It is composed of two villages, Călugăreni and Valea Scheilor.

Historical population
Year	Pop.	±%
2002	1,450	—
2011	1,279	−11.8%
2021	1,013	−20.8%
Source: Census data
