= Auzielle =

- Commune
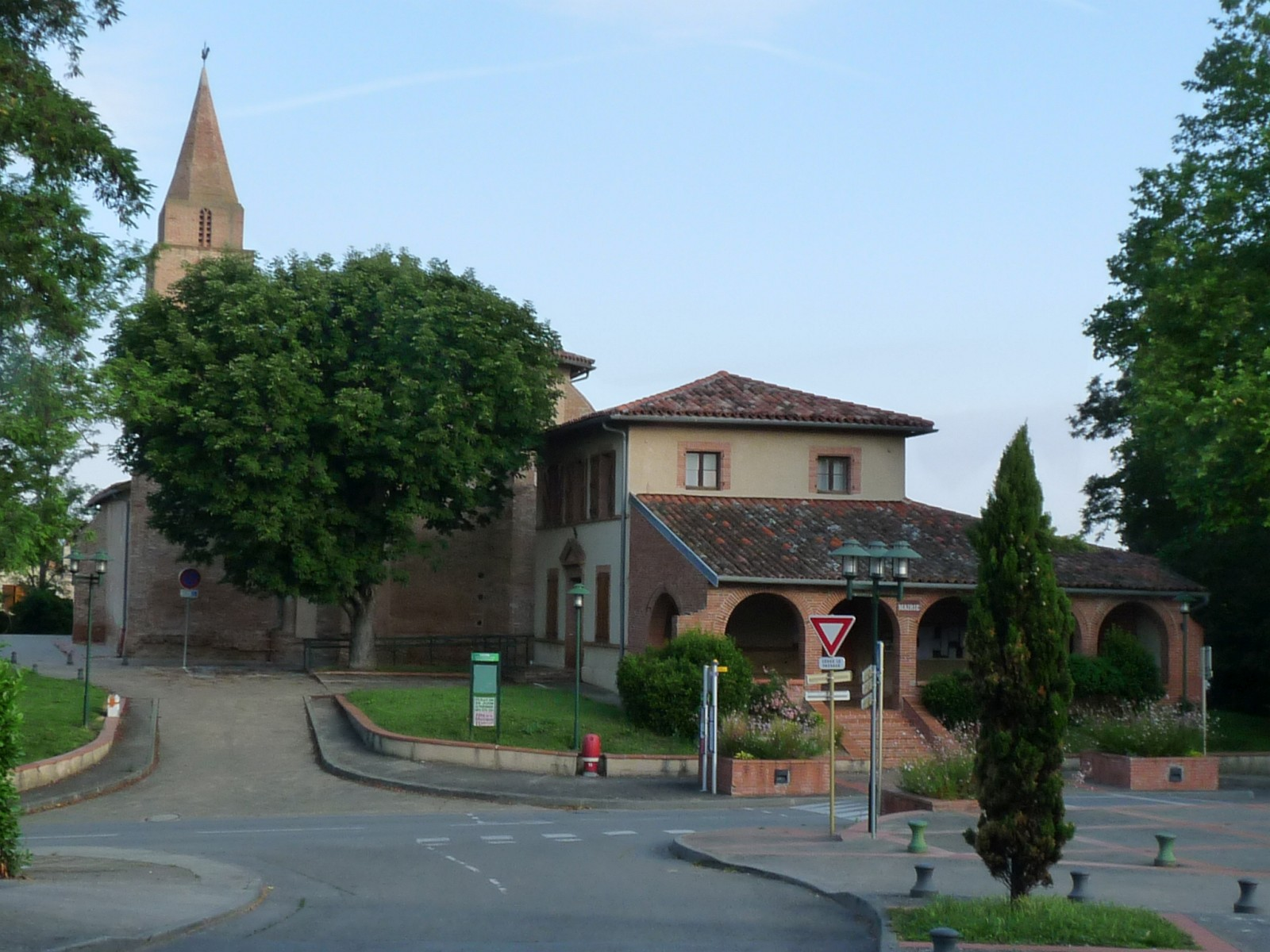
- The town hall and church in Auzielle

- Coat of arms
- Location of Auzielle
- Location within France Location within Occitanie
- Coordinates: 43°32′33″N 1°34′00″E
- Country: France
- Region: Occitania
- Department: Haute-Garonne
- Arrondissement: Toulouse
- Canton: Castanet-Tolosan
- Intercommunality: CA Sicoval

Government
  - Mayor (2020–2026): Michèle Ségafredo
- Area^{1}: 4.59 km^{2} (1.77 sq mi)
- Elevation: 188 m (617 ft)
- Highest elevation: 234 m (768 ft)
- Lowest elevation: 154 m (505 ft)
- Population (2023): 1,635
  - Density: 356/km^{2} (923/sq mi)
- Time zone: UTC+01:00 (CET)
  - Summer (DST): UTC+02:00 (CEST)
- INSEE/Postal code: 31036 /31650
- ^{1} French Land Register data, which excludes lakes, ponds, glaciers > 1 km^{2} (0.386 sq mi or 247 acres) and river estuaries.

Auzielle (French pronunciation: [ozjɛl]; Occitan: Ausièla) is a commune in the Haute-Garonne department in southwestern France.

== Population ==
Its inhabitants are called Auziellois.

Historical population
Year	Pop.	±% p.a.
1968	138	—
1975	410	+16.83%
1982	1,002	+13.62%
1990	1,091	+1.07%
1999	1,558	+4.04%
2007	1,353	−1.75%
2012	1,270	−1.26%
2017	1,500	+3.38%
2023	1,635	+1.45%
Source: INSEE

== See also ==
- Communes of the Haute-Garonne department
