= Pechbusque =

- Commune
- Coat of arms
- Location of Pechbusque
- Location within France Location within Occitanie
- Coordinates: 43°31′44″N 1°27′36″E
- Country: France
- Region: Occitania
- Department: Haute-Garonne
- Arrondissement: Toulouse
- Canton: Castanet-Tolosan
- Intercommunality: CA Sicoval

Government
  - Mayor (2020–2026): Didier Bélair
- Area^{1}: 3.14 km^{2} (1.21 sq mi)
- Elevation: 240 m (790 ft)
- Highest elevation: 274 m (899 ft)
- Lowest elevation: 148 m (486 ft)
- Population (2023): 975
  - Density: 311/km^{2} (804/sq mi)
- Time zone: UTC+01:00 (CET)
  - Summer (DST): UTC+02:00 (CEST)
- INSEE/Postal code: 31411 /31320
- ^{1} French Land Register data, which excludes lakes, ponds, glaciers > 1 km^{2} (0.386 sq mi or 247 acres) and river estuaries.

Pechbusque (French pronunciation: [pɛʃbysk]; Occitan: Puègbusca) is a commune in the Haute-Garonne department in southwestern France.

== Population ==
Historical population
Year	Pop.	±% p.a.
1968	187	—
1975	235	+3.32%
1982	371	+6.74%
1990	522	+4.36%
1999	707	+3.43%
2007	797	+1.51%
2012	834	+0.91%
2017	882	+1.13%
2023	975	+1.68%
Source: INSEE

== See also ==
- Communes of the Haute-Garonne department
