= Castanet-Tolosan =

- Commune
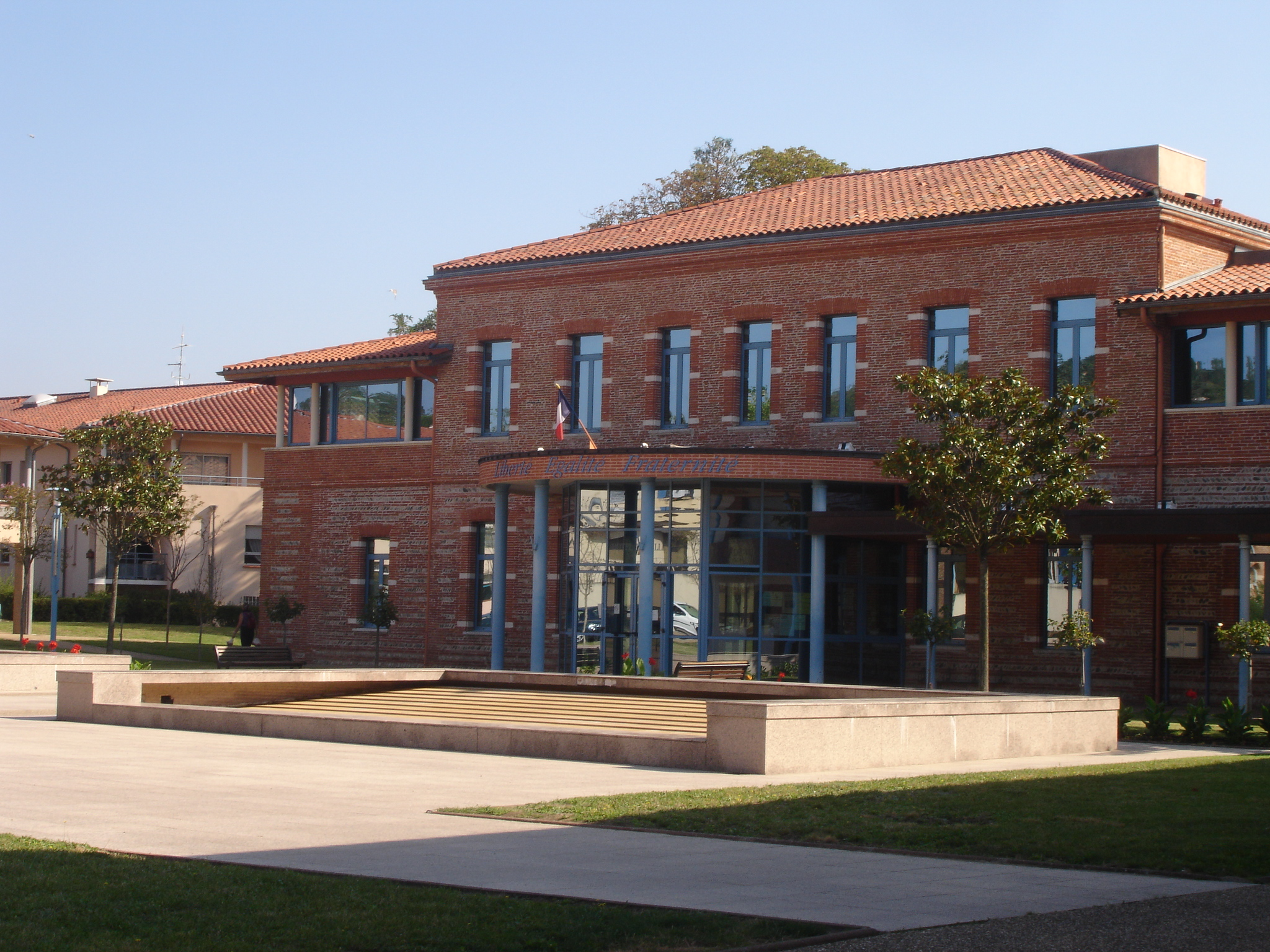
- Town hall

- Coat of arms
- Location of Castanet-Tolosan
- Location within France Location within Occitanie
- Coordinates: 43°30′59″N 1°29′56″E
- Country: France
- Region: Occitania
- Department: Haute-Garonne
- Arrondissement: Toulouse
- Canton: Castanet-Tolosan
- Intercommunality: CA Sicoval

Government
  - Mayor (2020–2026): Xavier Normand
- Area^{1}: 8.22 km^{2} (3.17 sq mi)
- Elevation: 164 m (538 ft)
- Highest elevation: 281 m (922 ft)
- Lowest elevation: 145 m (476 ft)
- Population (2023): 15,317
  - Density: 1,860/km^{2} (4,830/sq mi)
- Time zone: UTC+01:00 (CET)
  - Summer (DST): UTC+02:00 (CEST)
- INSEE/Postal code: 31113 /31320
- Website: Official website
- ^{1} French Land Register data, which excludes lakes, ponds, glaciers > 1 km^{2} (0.386 sq mi or 247 acres) and river estuaries.

Castanet-Tolosan (French pronunciation: [kastanɛ tɔlozɑ̃]; Occitan: Castanet Tolosan) is a commune in the Haute-Garonne department in southwestern France.

== Population ==
Historical population

Year	Pop.	±% p.a.
1793	853	—
1800	848	−0.08%
1806	846	−0.04%
1821	977	+0.96%
1831	1,064	+0.86%
1836	1,120	+1.03%
1841	1,156	+0.63%
1846	1,157	+0.02%
1851	1,164	+0.12%
1856	1,120	−0.77%
1861	1,084	−0.65%
1866	1,050	−0.64%
1872	944	−1.76%
1876	915	−0.78%
1881	905	−0.22%
1886	903	−0.04%
1891	829	−1.70%
1896	848	+0.45%
1901	843	−0.12%

Year	Pop.	±% p.a.
1906	766	−1.90%
1911	808	+1.07%
1921	744	−0.82%
1926	806	+1.61%
1931	872	+1.59%
1936	901	+0.66%
1946	1,002	+1.07%
1954	1,157	+1.81%
1962	1,544	+3.67%
1968	1,847	+3.03%
1975	2,996	+7.15%
1982	4,668	+6.54%
1990	7,697	+6.45%
1999	10,250	+3.23%
2007	10,744	+0.59%
2012	11,440	+1.26%
2017	13,529	+3.41%
2023	15,317	+2.09%

Source: EHESS and INSEE (1968-2023)

== See also ==
- Communes of the Haute-Garonne department
