= Ramonville-Saint-Agne =

- Commune
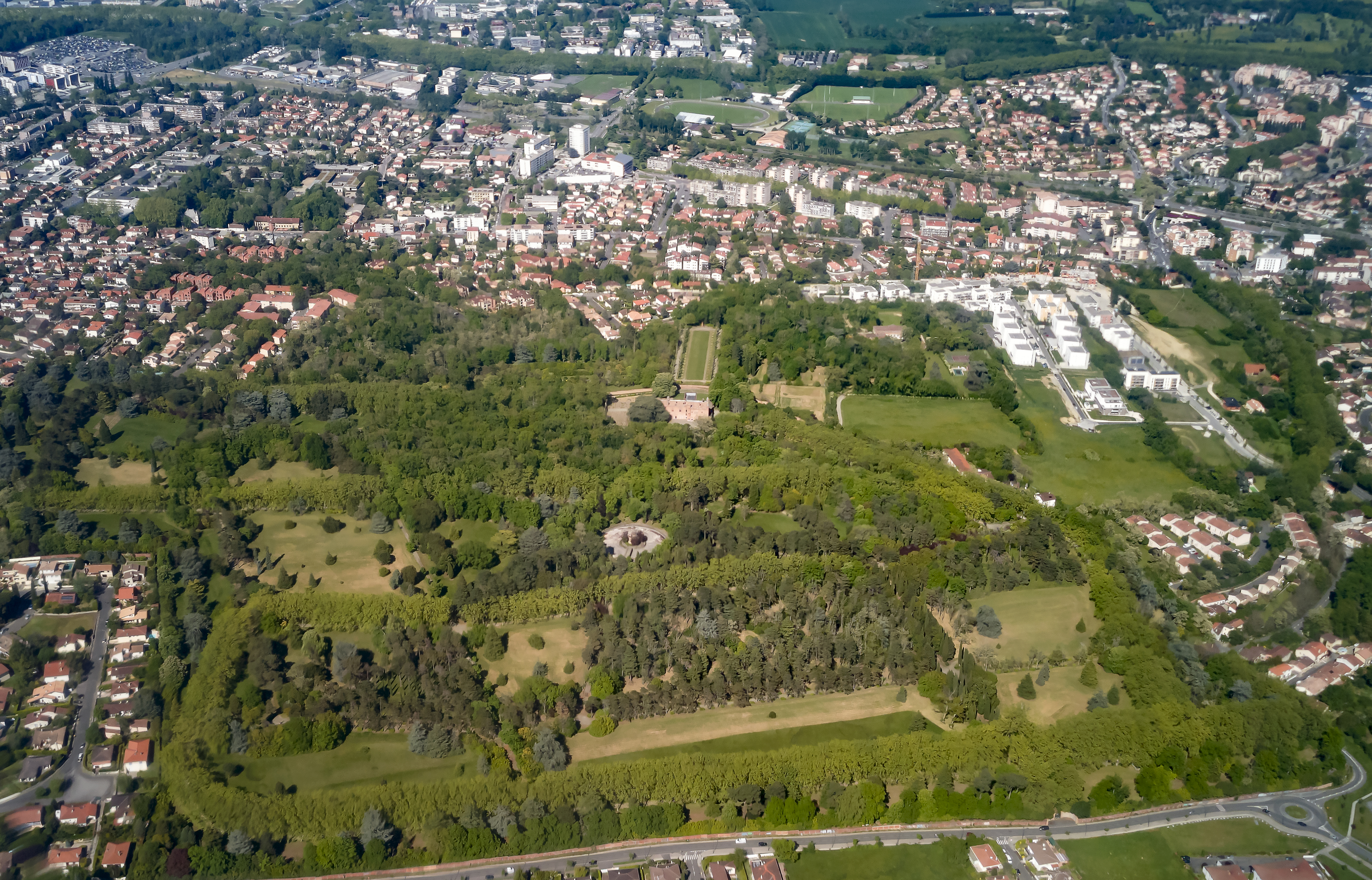
- Ramonville-Saint-Agne

- Coat of arms
- Location of Ramonville-Saint-Agne
- Location within France Location within Occitanie
- Coordinates: 43°32′36″N 1°28′43″E
- Country: France
- Region: Occitania
- Department: Haute-Garonne
- Arrondissement: Toulouse
- Canton: Toulouse-11
- Intercommunality: CA Sicoval

Government
  - Mayor (2020–2026): Christophe Lubac
- Area^{1}: 6.46 km^{2} (2.49 sq mi)
- Elevation: 162 m (531 ft)
- Highest elevation: 252 m (827 ft)
- Lowest elevation: 143 m (469 ft)
- Population (2023): 15,158
  - Density: 2,350/km^{2} (6,080/sq mi)
- Time zone: UTC+01:00 (CET)
  - Summer (DST): UTC+02:00 (CEST)
- INSEE/Postal code: 31446 /31520
- ^{1} French Land Register data, which excludes lakes, ponds, glaciers > 1 km^{2} (0.386 sq mi or 247 acres) and river estuaries.

Ramonville-Saint-Agne (French pronunciation: [ʁamɔ̃vil sɛ̃taɲ]; Occitan: Ramonvila e Sant Anha), commonly known as Ramonville, is a commune in the suburbs of Toulouse, located in the French department of Haute-Garonne, in the administrative region of Occitania, France.

== Population ==
The inhabitants of the commune are known as Ramonvillois.

Historical population
Year	Pop.	±% p.a.
1968	2,214	—
1975	8,699	+21.59%
1982	10,561	+2.81%
1990	11,834	+1.43%
1999	11,696	−0.13%
2007	11,660	−0.04%
2012	12,610	+1.58%
2017	14,388	+2.67%
2023	15,158	+0.87%
Source: INSEE

== History and Economy ==
Politically, this commune has a historical affinity with the left-wing parties. Its economy is linked to the social work association ASEI.

== Twin Towns ==
Ramonville-Saint-Agne is twinned with:

- Karben, Germany
- Zuera, Spain

== See also ==
- Communes of the Haute-Garonne department
