= L'Union =

- Commune
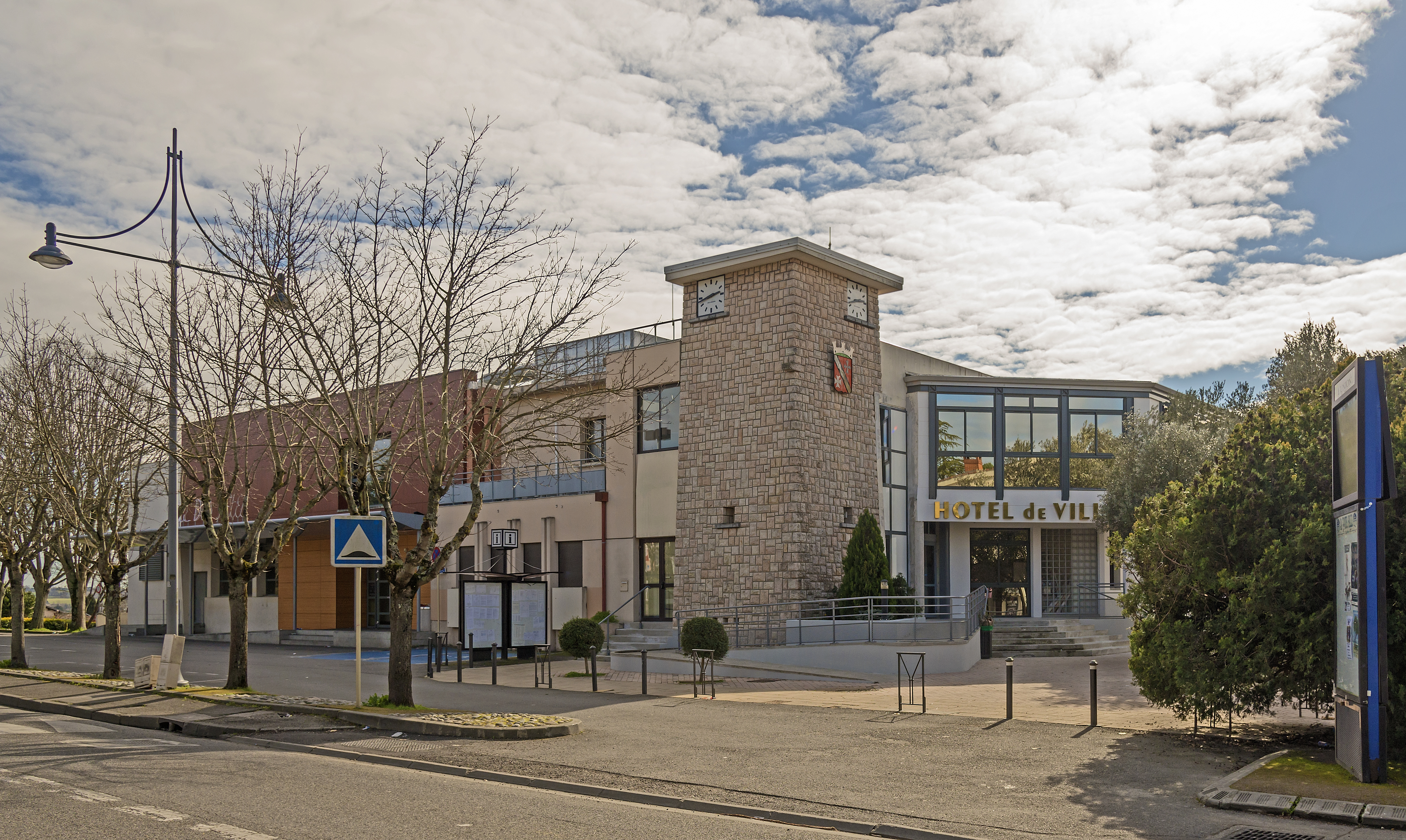
- The town hall in L'Union

- Coat of arms
- Location of L'Union
- Location within France Location within Occitanie
- Coordinates: 43°39′27″N 1°29′07″E
- Country: France
- Region: Occitania
- Department: Haute-Garonne
- Arrondissement: Toulouse
- Canton: Toulouse-9
- Intercommunality: Toulouse Métropole

Government
  - Mayor (2020–2026): Marc Péré
- Area^{1}: 6.77 km^{2} (2.61 sq mi)
- Elevation: 146 m (479 ft)
- Highest elevation: 196 m (643 ft)
- Lowest elevation: 132 m (433 ft)
- Population (2023): 12,638
  - Density: 1,870/km^{2} (4,830/sq mi)
- Time zone: UTC+01:00 (CET)
  - Summer (DST): UTC+02:00 (CEST)
- INSEE/Postal code: 31561 /31240
- ^{1} French Land Register data, which excludes lakes, ponds, glaciers > 1 km^{2} (0.386 sq mi or 247 acres) and river estuaries.

L'Union (French pronunciation: [lynjɔ̃]; Occitan: Sent Joan le Nòu) is a commune in the Haute-Garonne department in southwestern France.

It is a suburb of Toulouse, located just to the northeast of the city.

== History ==
L'Union was founded in the 1790s after the fusion of Belbèze and Cornaudric. After leaving Spain, Napoleon's troops, under the command of Field Marshal and Marshal of the Empire Soult, battled there against troops under the command of the Duke of Wellington. The name Saint-Jean-de-l'Union is still spoken of, recalling the time when the communes of Saint-Jean et L'Union were unified.

== Population ==
Historical population
Year	Pop.	±% p.a.
1968	4,601	—
1975	7,817	+7.87%
1982	10,461	+4.25%
1990	11,751	+1.46%
1999	12,141	+0.36%
2007	12,392	+0.26%
2012	11,702	−1.14%
2017	11,715	+0.02%
2023	12,638	+1.27%
Source: INSEE

== Education ==
L'Union has three nursery and primary schools (Belbèze-lès-Toulouse, Borde d'Olivier and Montizalguier), and one high school (collège Georges Chaumeton, named after the former mayor).

== Sights ==
L'Union features an olive tree celebrating the new millennium, at the Town Hall. The Grand Hall of L'Union regularly welcomes artists. Its church features architecture of the nineteenth century.

== Sport ==
L'Union has a sport club, established in 1957, called the ASU, with more than 5000 members and 300 organisers, and 26 different sports such as yoga, football, handball, rugby and tennis. The main park of L'Union is Parc de Malpagat, on the D888 road.

== Sights ==
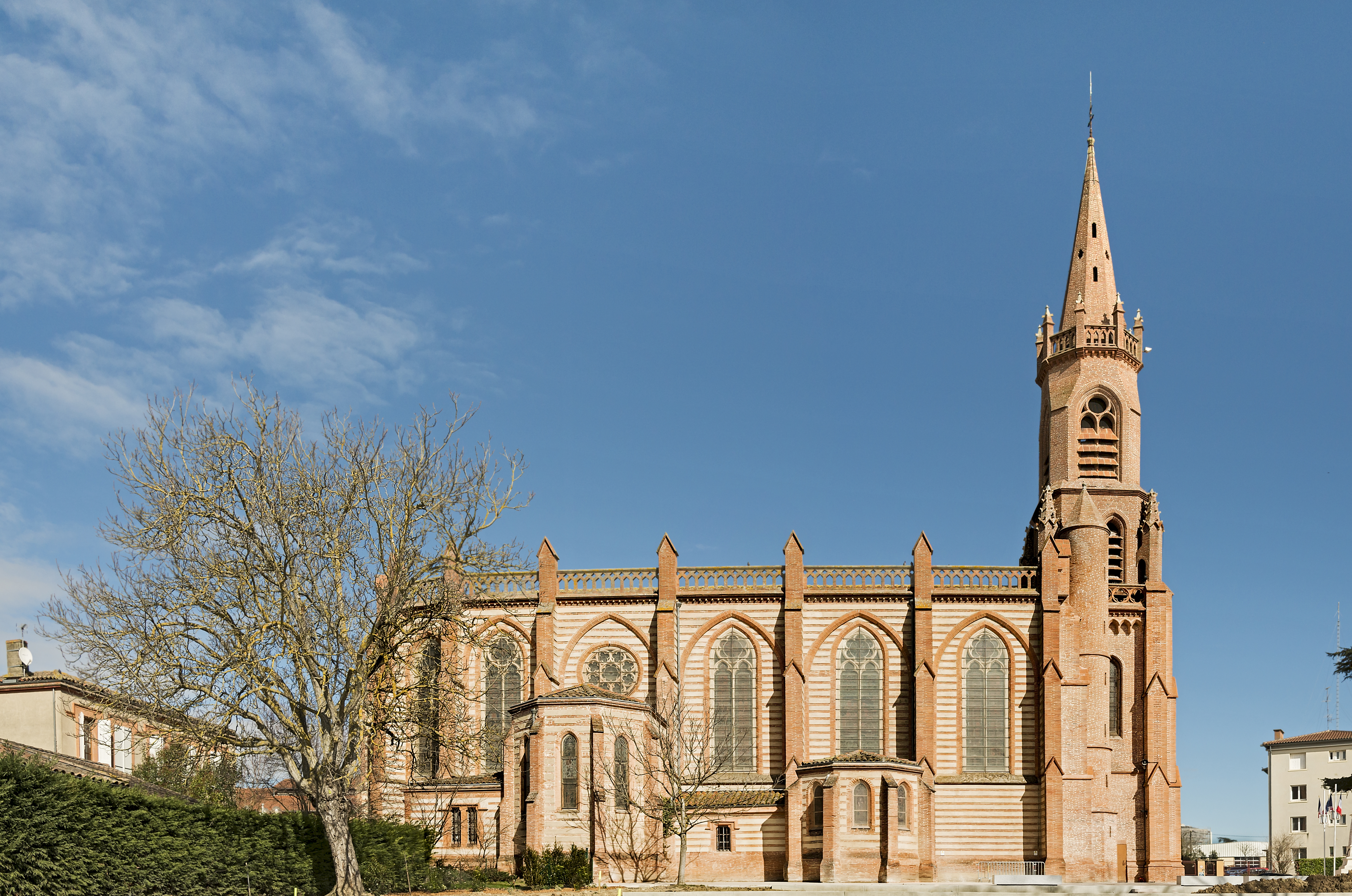
Church.

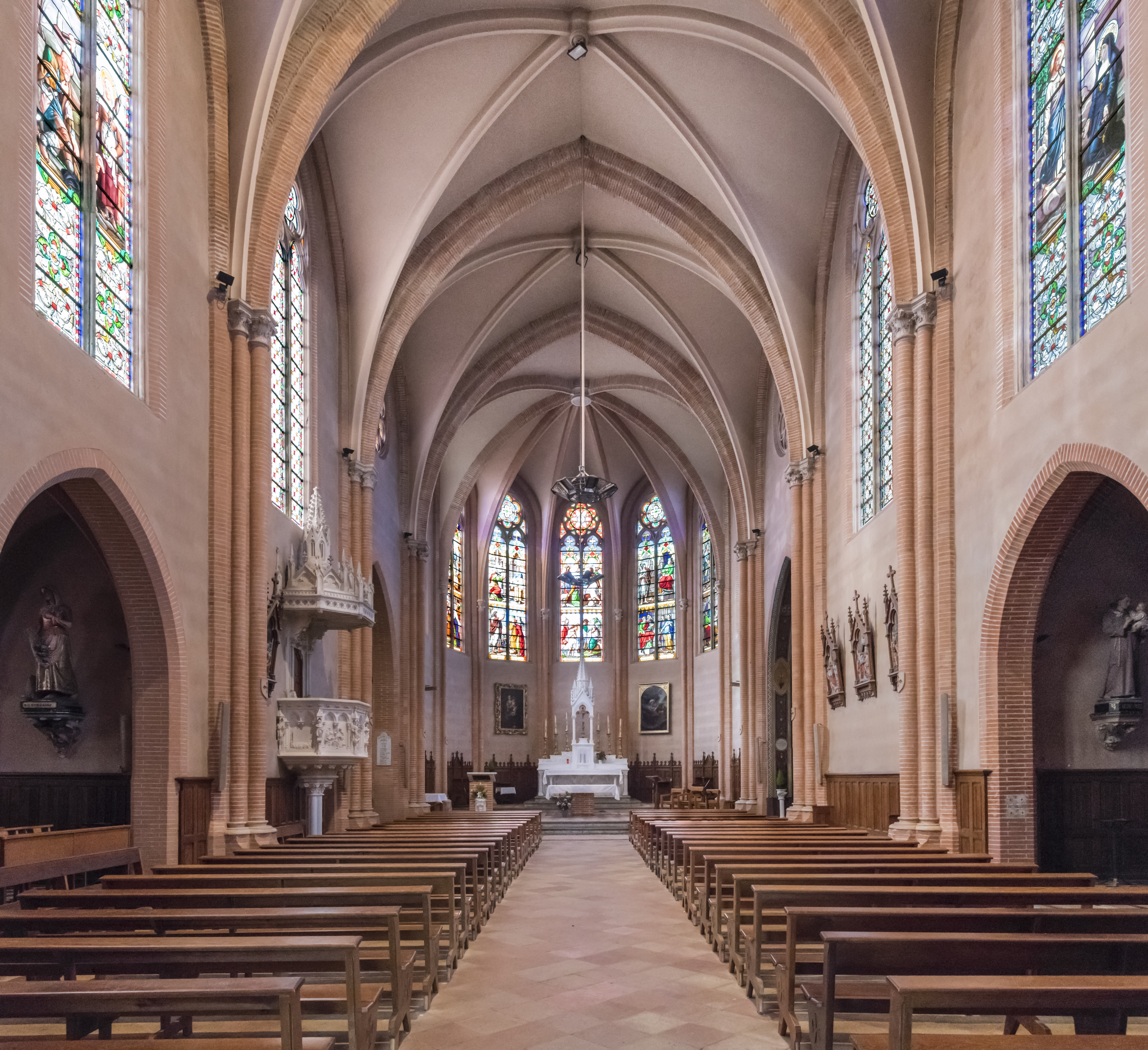

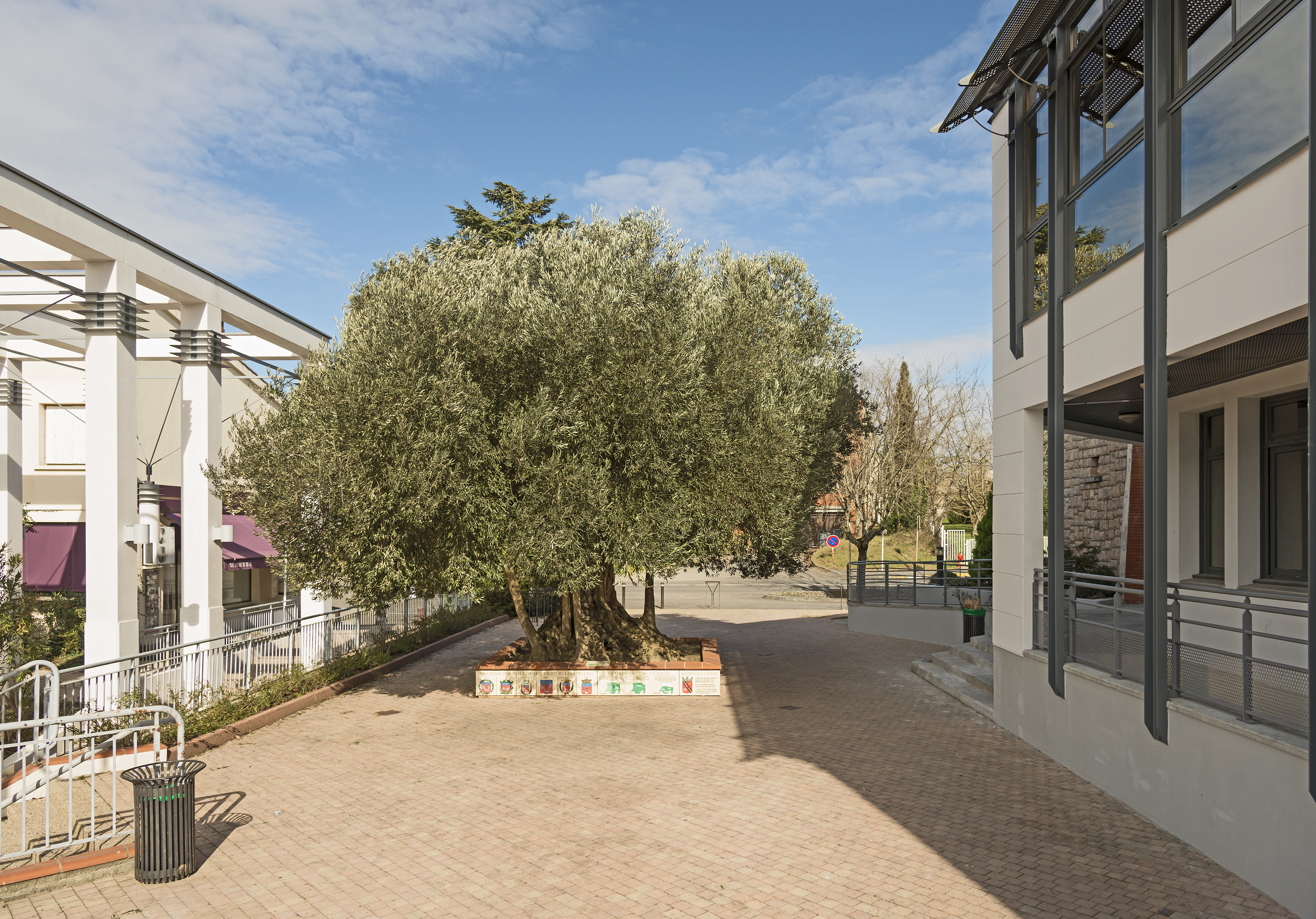
The millennium olive tree.

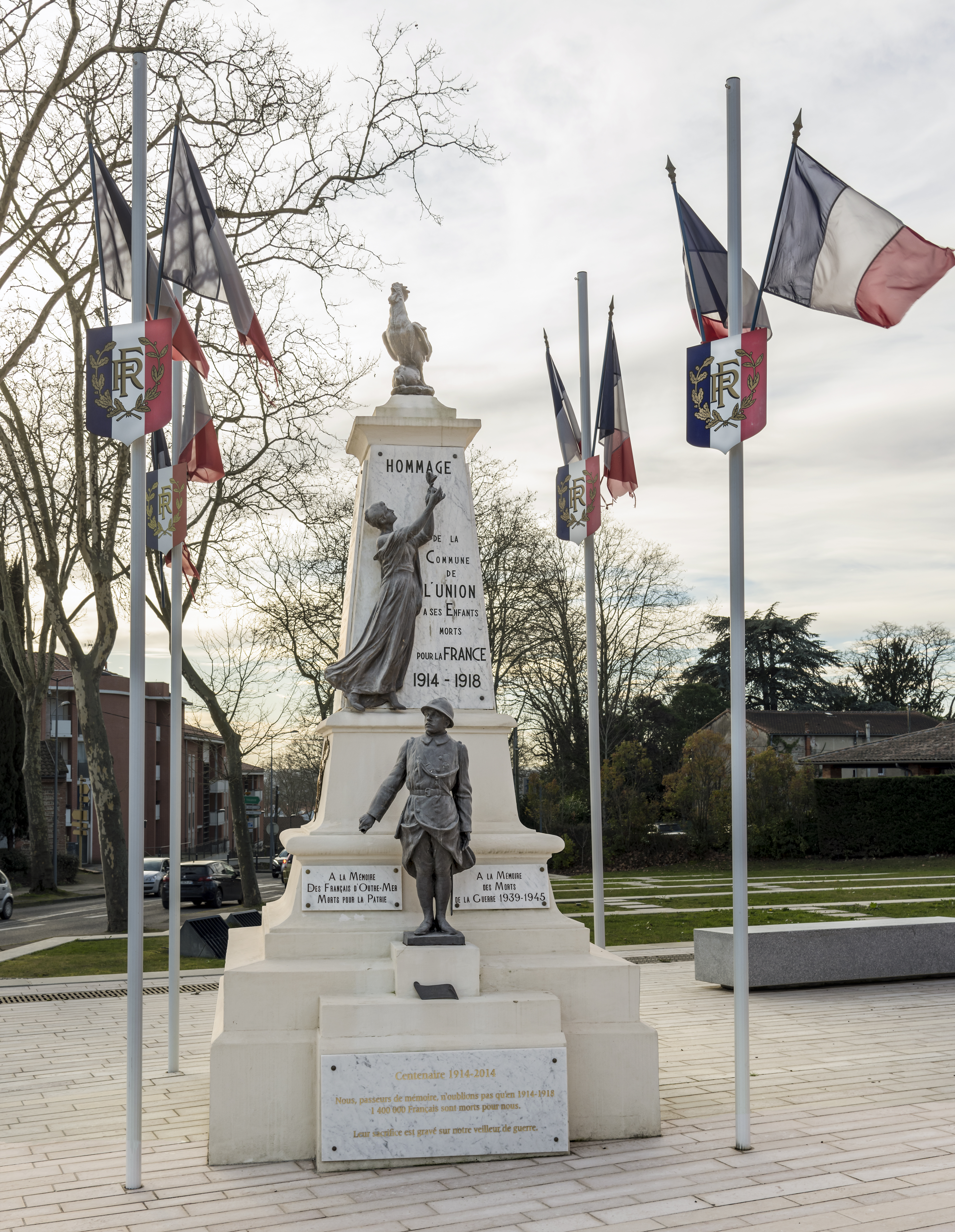
The war memorial.

== Transport ==
The D888 (Route d'Albi) road runs through the town in a south-west direction towards Toulouse and north-east to Albi, roughly 75 kilometres away. The A68 motorway (Toulouse-Albi) and the Périphérique bypass the south of L'Union, served by Junctions 1 and 14 respectively.

In a clockwise order, L'Union is bordered by Toulouse, Launaguet, Saint-Geniès-Bellevue, Saint-Jean, Montrabé and Balma.

== See also ==
- Communes of the Haute-Garonne department
