= Flourens =

Flourens may refer to:

== Places ==
- Flourens, Haute-Garonne, a commune of France, in the Haute-Garonne département

== People ==
- Émile Flourens (1841–1920), French revolutionary and writer
- Gustave Flourens (1838–1871), French politician
- Jean Pierre Flourens (1794–1867), French physiologist
