= Canton of Toulouse-10 =

Coordinates: 43.60°N 1.48°E

The canton of Toulouse-10 is an administrative division of the Haute-Garonne department, southern France. Its borders were modified at the French canton reorganisation which came into effect in March 2015. Its seat is in Toulouse.

It consists of the following communes:

1. Balma
2. Beaupuy
3. Drémil-Lafage
4. Flourens
5. Mondouzil
6. Mons
7. Montrabé
8. Pin-Balma
9. Quint-Fonsegrives
10. Toulouse (partly)
