= Quint-Fonsegrives =

- Commune
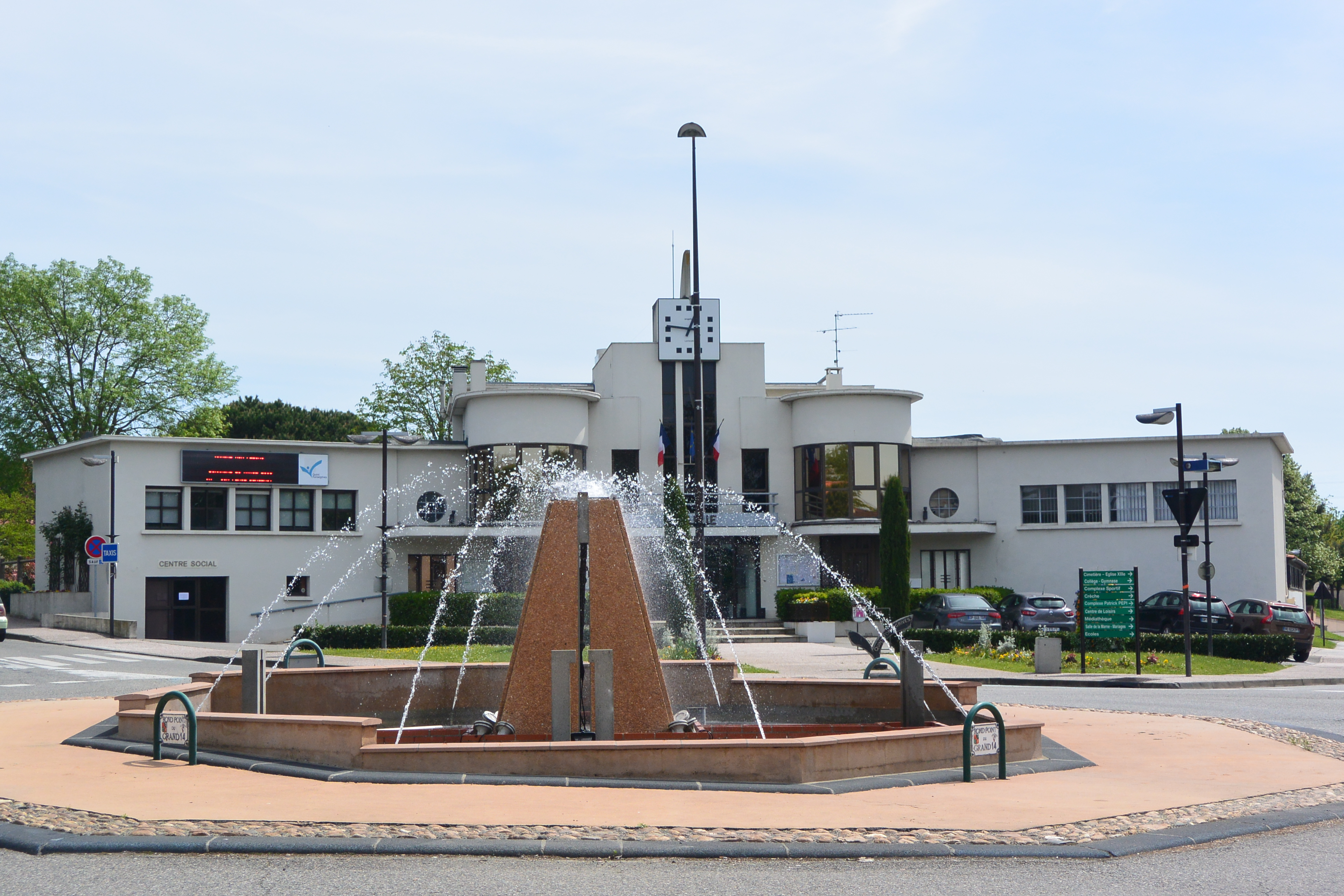
- The town hall in Quint-Fonsegrives

- Coat of arms
- Location of Quint-Fonsegrives
- Location within France Location within Occitanie
- Coordinates: 43°35′09″N 1°31′37″E
- Country: France
- Region: Occitania
- Department: Haute-Garonne
- Arrondissement: Toulouse
- Canton: Toulouse-10
- Intercommunality: Toulouse Métropole

Government
  - Mayor (2020–2026): Jean-Pierre Gasc
- Area^{1}: 7.38 km^{2} (2.85 sq mi)
- Elevation: 153 m (502 ft)
- Highest elevation: 234 m (768 ft)
- Lowest elevation: 141 m (463 ft)
- Population (2023): 6,133
  - Density: 831/km^{2} (2,150/sq mi)
- Time zone: UTC+01:00 (CET)
  - Summer (DST): UTC+02:00 (CEST)
- INSEE/Postal code: 31445 /31130
- ^{1} French Land Register data, which excludes lakes, ponds, glaciers > 1 km^{2} (0.386 sq mi or 247 acres) and river estuaries.

Quint-Fonsegrives (French pronunciation: [kɛ̃ fɔ̃səɡʁiv]; Occitan: Quint e Fontsagrivas, before 1992: Quint) is a commune in the Haute-Garonne department in southwestern France.

== Population ==
The inhabitants of the commune are known as Quintfonsegrivois in French.

Historical population
Year	Pop.	±% p.a.
1968	749	—
1975	2,247	+16.99%
1982	2,711	+2.72%
1990	3,261	+2.34%
1999	4,478	+3.59%
2007	4,532	+0.15%
2012	5,052	+2.20%
2017	5,674	+2.35%
2023	6,133	+1.30%
Source: INSEE

== Twin towns ==
In 15 November 2010, Quint-Fonsegrives became the twin town of Leiria in Portugal.

== See also ==
- Communes of the Haute-Garonne department
