= Mons, Haute-Garonne =

Mons
- Commune
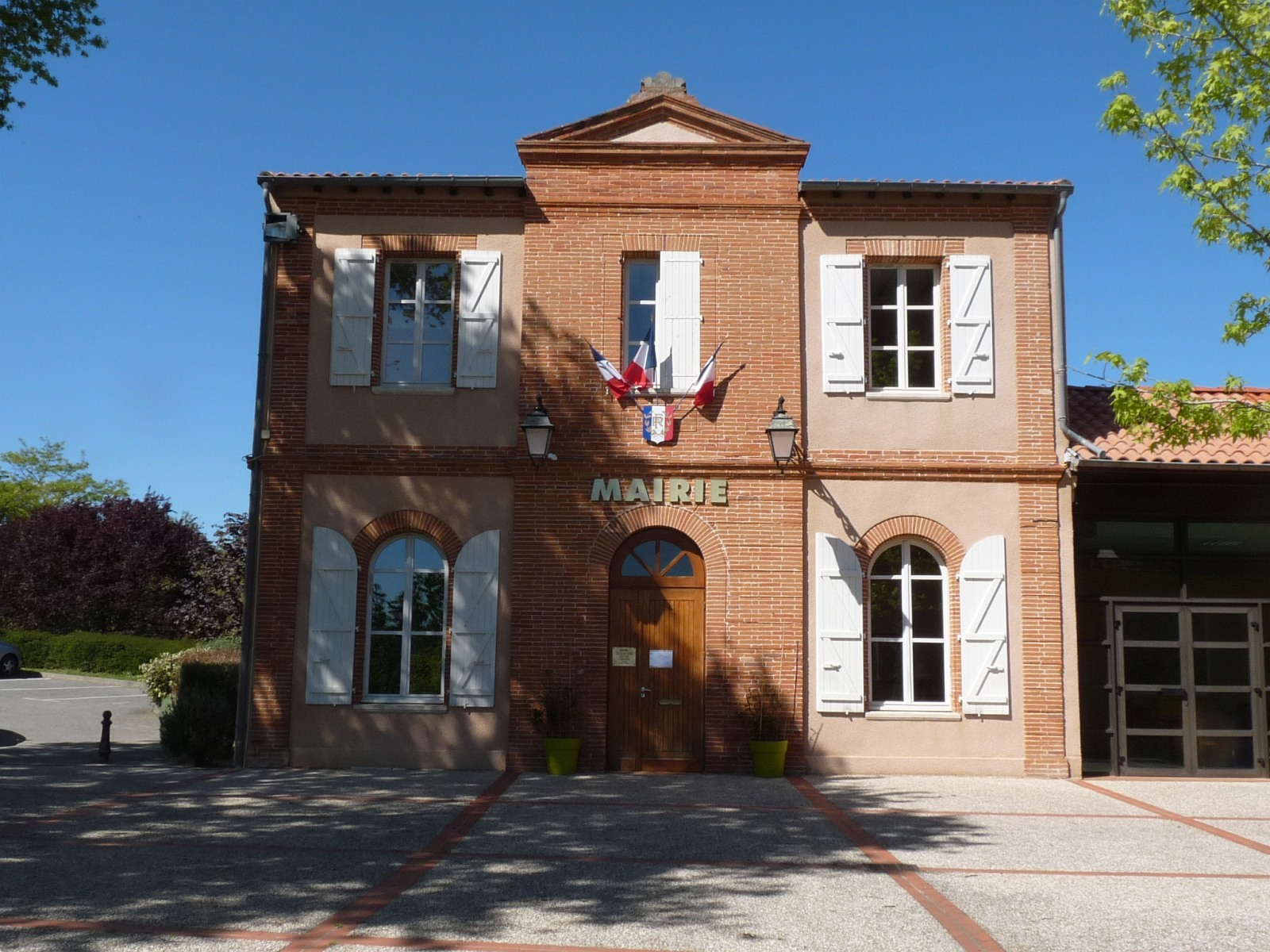
- The town hall in Mons

- Coat of arms
- Location of Mons
- Location within France Location within Occitanie
- Coordinates: 43°36′41″N 1°34′31″E
- Country: France
- Region: Occitania
- Department: Haute-Garonne
- Arrondissement: Toulouse
- Canton: Toulouse-10
- Intercommunality: Toulouse Métropole

Government
  - Mayor (2020–2026): Véronique Doittau
- Area^{1}: 7.32 km^{2} (2.83 sq mi)
- Elevation: 150 m (490 ft)
- Highest elevation: 233 m (764 ft)
- Lowest elevation: 151 m (495 ft)
- Population (2023): 1,861
  - Density: 254/km^{2} (658/sq mi)
- Time zone: UTC+01:00 (CET)
  - Summer (DST): UTC+02:00 (CEST)
- INSEE/Postal code: 31355 /31280
- ^{1} French Land Register data, which excludes lakes, ponds, glaciers > 1 km^{2} (0.386 sq mi or 247 acres) and river estuaries.

Mons (French pronunciation: [mɔ̃s]; Occitan: Monts) is a commune in the Haute-Garonne department of southwestern France on the edge of the Pyrénées.

== Population ==
Historical population
Year	Pop.	±% p.a.
1968	272	—
1975	460	+7.79%
1982	648	+5.02%
1990	750	+1.84%
1999	1,085	+4.19%
2007	1,413	+3.36%
2012	1,582	+2.29%
2017	1,780	+2.39%
2023	1,861	+0.74%
Source: INSEE

== See also ==
- Communes of the Haute-Garonne department
