= Beaupuy, Haute-Garonne =

Beaupuy
- Commune
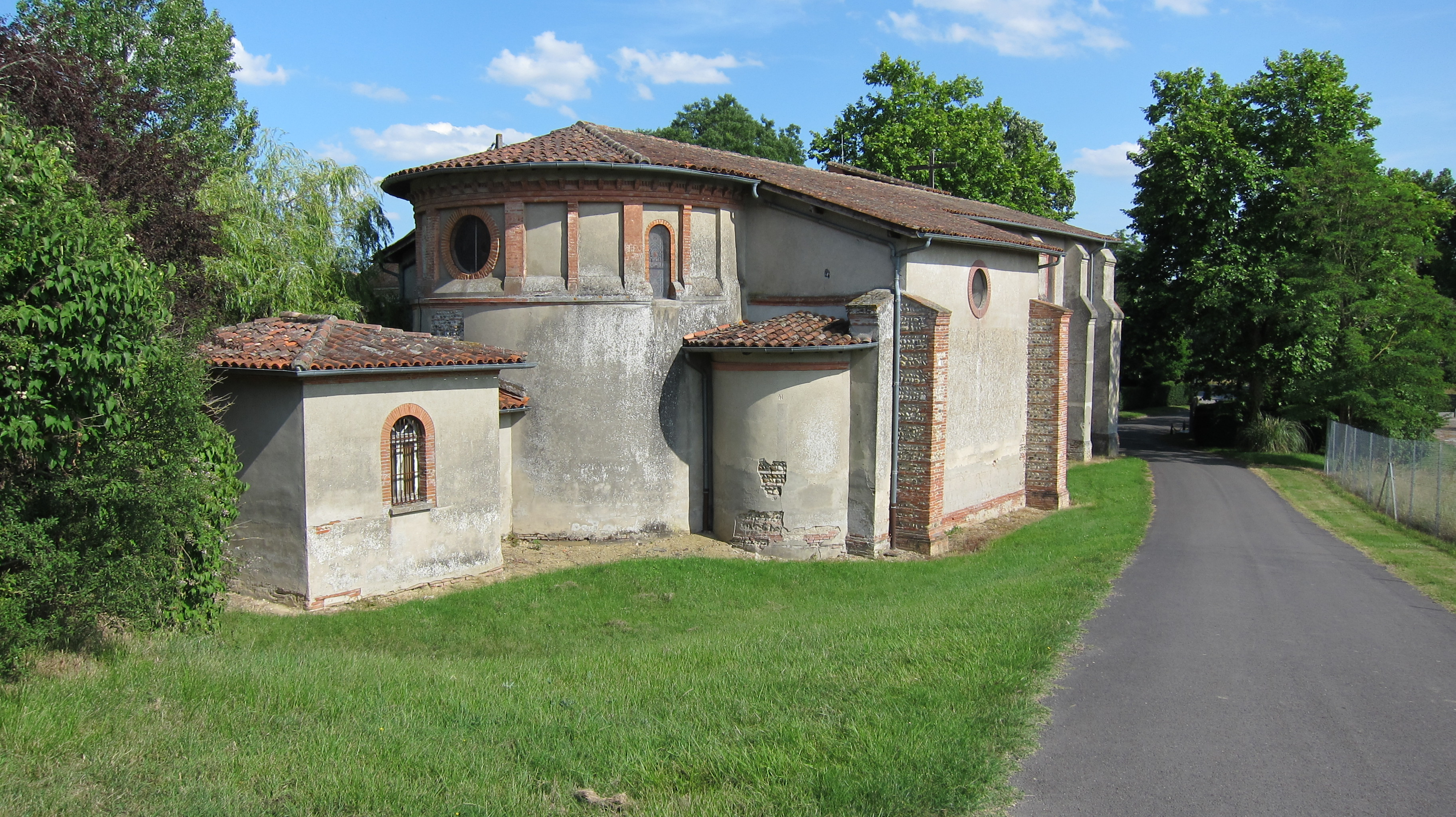
- The church in Beaupuy

- Coat of arms
- Location of Beaupuy
- Location within France Location within Occitanie
- Coordinates: 43°38′53″N 1°33′19″E
- Country: France
- Region: Occitania
- Department: Haute-Garonne
- Arrondissement: Toulouse
- Canton: Toulouse-10
- Intercommunality: Toulouse Métropole

Government
  - Mayor (2020–2026): Marc Fernandez
- Area^{1}: 5.84 km^{2} (2.25 sq mi)
- Elevation: 153 m (502 ft)
- Highest elevation: 221 m (725 ft)
- Lowest elevation: 152 m (499 ft)
- Population (2023): 1,283
  - Density: 220/km^{2} (569/sq mi)
- Time zone: UTC+01:00 (CET)
  - Summer (DST): UTC+02:00 (CEST)
- INSEE/Postal code: 31053 /31850
- ^{1} French Land Register data, which excludes lakes, ponds, glaciers > 1 km^{2} (0.386 sq mi or 247 acres) and river estuaries.

Beaupuy (French pronunciation: [bopɥi]; Occitan: Bèlpuèg) is a commune in the Haute-Garonne department in southwestern France.

== Population ==
Historical population
Year	Pop.	±% p.a.
1968	196	—
1975	239	+2.87%
1982	727	+17.22%
1990	1,039	+4.56%
1999	1,095	+0.58%
2007	1,297	+2.14%
2012	1,247	−0.78%
2017	1,340	+1.45%
2023	1,283	−0.72%
Source: INSEE

The inhabitants of the commune are known as Beaupéens in French.

== See also ==
- Communes of the Haute-Garonne department
