= Mondouzil =

- Commune
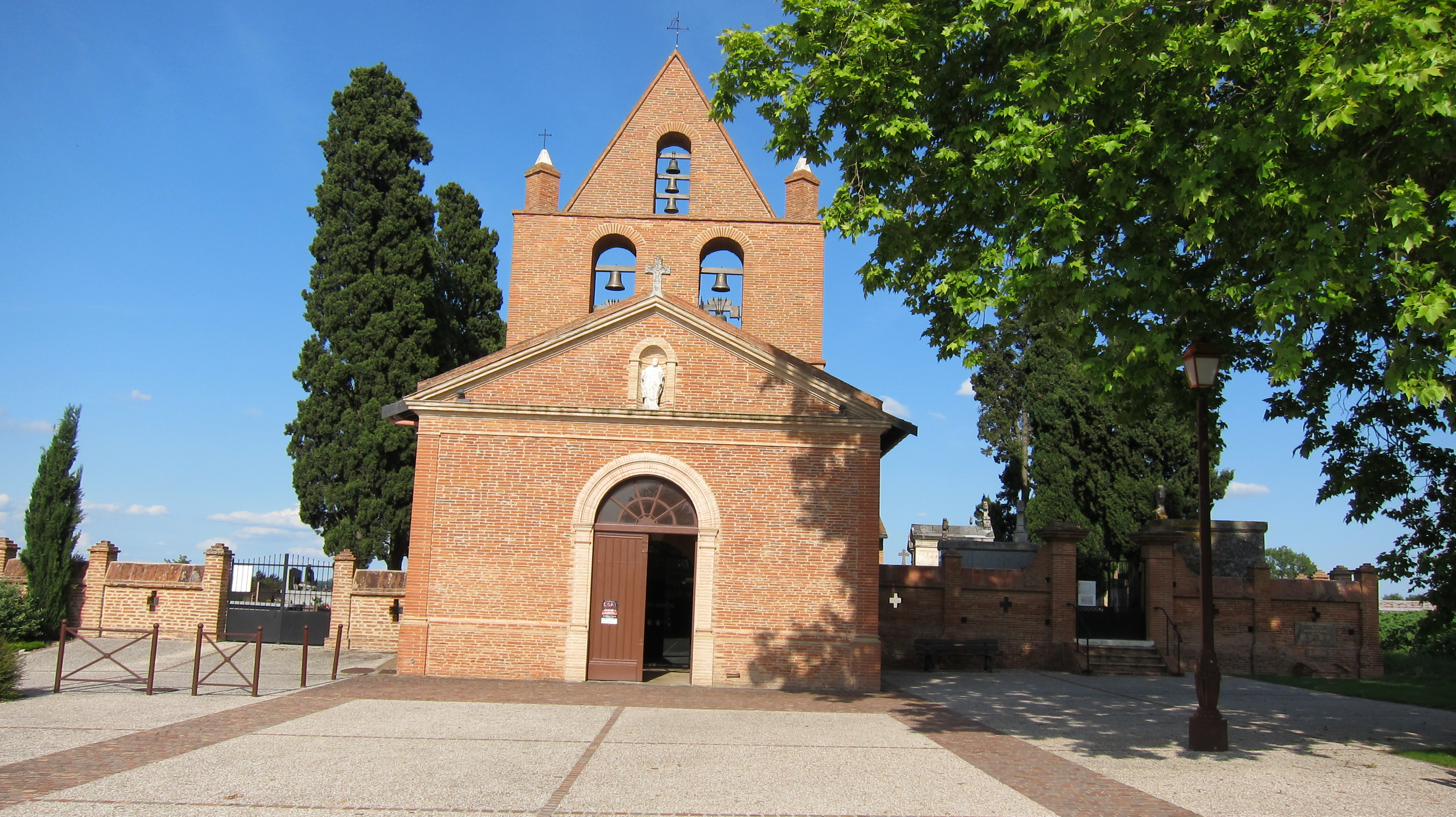
- The church in Mondouzil
- Location of Mondouzil
- Location within France Location within Occitanie
- Coordinates: 43°38′05″N 1°33′25″E
- Country: France
- Region: Occitania
- Department: Haute-Garonne
- Arrondissement: Toulouse
- Canton: Toulouse-10
- Intercommunality: Toulouse Métropole

Government
  - Mayor (2020–2026): Robert Médina
- Area^{1}: 4.09 km^{2} (1.58 sq mi)
- Elevation: 200 m (660 ft)
- Highest elevation: 231 m (758 ft)
- Lowest elevation: 155 m (509 ft)
- Population (2023): 210
  - Density: 51/km^{2} (130/sq mi)
- Time zone: UTC+01:00 (CET)
  - Summer (DST): UTC+02:00 (CEST)
- INSEE/Postal code: 31352 /31850
- ^{1} French Land Register data, which excludes lakes, ponds, glaciers > 1 km^{2} (0.386 sq mi or 247 acres) and river estuaries.

Mondouzil (French pronunciation: [mɔ̃duzil]; Occitan: Montdosilh) is a commune in the Haute-Garonne department of southwestern France.

== Population ==
Historical population
Year	Pop.	±% p.a.
1968	119	—
1975	119	+0.00%
1982	126	+0.82%
1990	137	+1.05%
1999	218	+5.30%
2007	223	+0.28%
2012	245	+1.90%
2017	235	−0.83%
2023	210	−1.86%
Source: INSEE

The inhabitants of the commune are known as Mondouziliens.

== See also ==
- Communes of the Haute-Garonne department
