= Toulouse Métropole =

Coordinates: 43°41′N 1°27′E

- Métropole
- Location within the Haute-Garonne department
- Country: France
- Region: Occitania
- Department: Haute-Garonne
- No. of communes: {{{nbcomm}}}
- Established: 1 January 2015

Government
  - President (2020–2026): Jean-Luc Moudenc (LR)
- Area: 458.2 km^{2} (176.9 sq mi)
- Population (2018): 783,353
  - Density: 1,710/km^{2} (4,428/sq mi)
- Website: www.toulouse-metropole.fr

Toulouse Métropole (French pronunciation: [tuluz metʁɔpɔl]; Occitan: Tolosa Metropòli) is one of 20 French metropolises, an intercommunal structure, centred on the city of Toulouse. Located in the Haute-Garonne department, in the Occitanie region, southern France. Created in January 2015, it replaced the previous Communauté urbaine de Toulouse. With an area of 458.2 km^{2}, and a population of 783,353 in 2018, of which 486,828 are in Toulouse proper. It is the 5th largest metropolis after Greater Paris, Aix-Marseille-Provence, Lille-Europe and Bordeaux. The annual budget is €1,4 billion (2015).

== History ==
Created on 1 January 2015, it succeeded the urban community of Toulouse, which had itself succeeded in 2009 and 2001 from previous districts created in 1992 with less power than either the urban community or the current metropolitan region.

== Geography ==
Due to local political feuds, Toulouse Métropole only hosts 59% of the population of the metropolitan area (see infobox at Toulouse article for the metropolitan area), the other independent communes of the metropolitan area having refused to join in, notably Muret and the technopolis of Labège-Innopole.

Consequently, the other parts of the metropolitan area have formed different intercommunal structures, such as:

- Communauté d'agglomération Le Muretain Agglo
- Communauté d'agglomération du Sicoval, with Labège-Innopole in it
- Communauté de communes de la Save au Touch
- etc.

== Member communes ==
The 37 communes of Toulouse Métropole are:

1. Aigrefeuille
2. Aucamville
3. Aussonne
4. Balma
5. Beaupuy
6. Beauzelle
7. Blagnac
8. Brax
9. Bruguières
10. Castelginest
11. Colomiers
12. Cornebarrieu
13. Cugnaux
14. Drémil-Lafage
15. Fenouillet
16. Flourens
17. Fonbeauzard
18. Gagnac-sur-Garonne
19. Gratentour
20. Launaguet
21. Lespinasse
22. Mondonville
23. Mondouzil
24. Mons
25. Montrabé
26. Pibrac
27. Pin-Balma
28. Quint-Fonsegrives
29. Saint-Alban
30. Saint-Jean
31. Saint-Jory
32. Saint-Orens-de-Gameville
33. Seilh
34. Toulouse
35. Tournefeuille
36. L'Union
37. Villeneuve-Tolosane
