= Pin-Balma =

- Commune
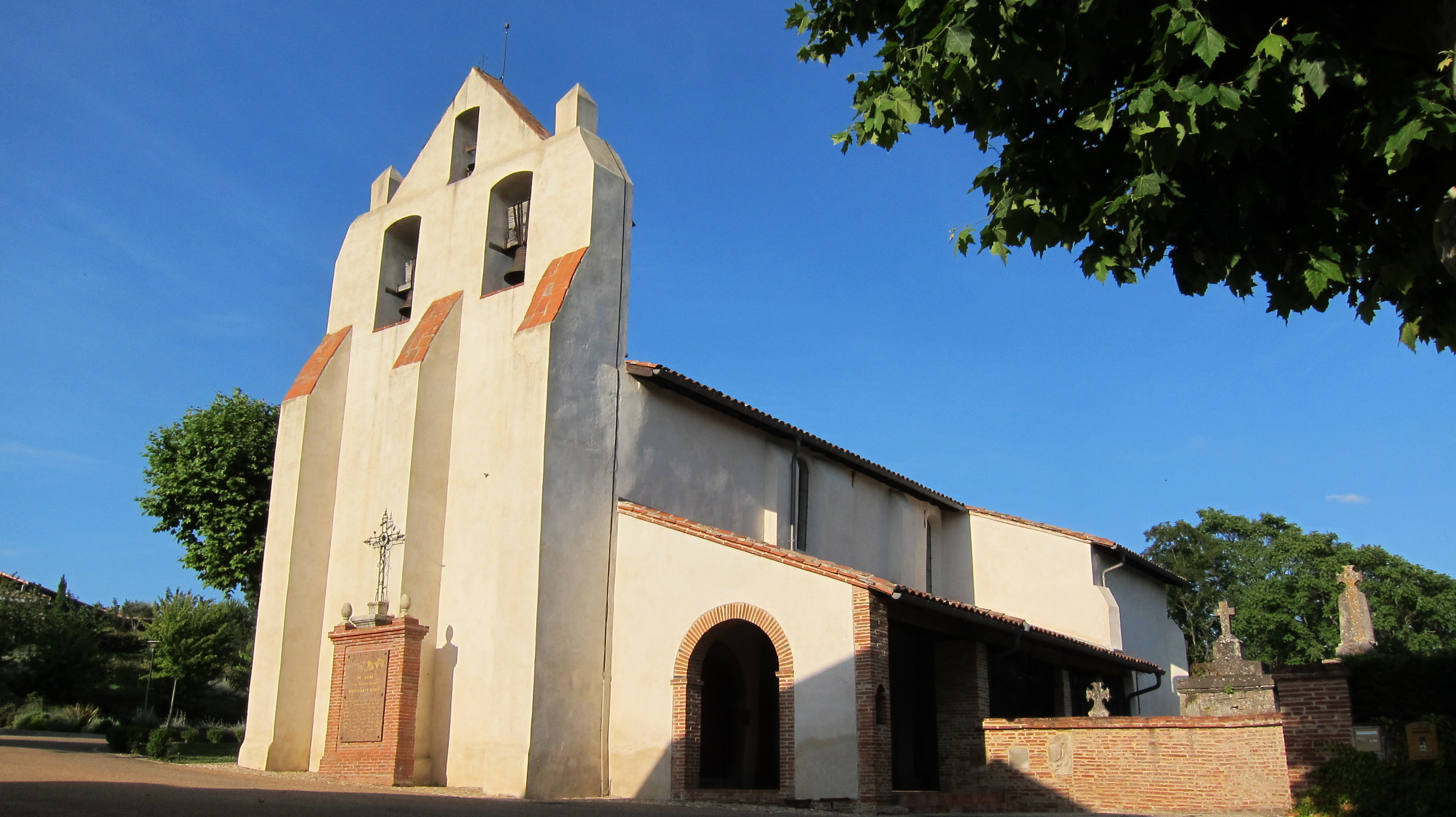
- The church in Pin-Balma
- Location of Pin-Balma
- Location within France Location within Occitanie
- Coordinates: 43°37′41″N 1°32′01″E
- Country: France
- Region: Occitania
- Department: Haute-Garonne
- Arrondissement: Toulouse
- Canton: Toulouse-10
- Intercommunality: Toulouse Métropole

Government
  - Mayor (2020–2026): Gil Bezerra
- Area^{1}: 6.63 km^{2} (2.56 sq mi)
- Elevation: 130 m (430 ft)
- Highest elevation: 231 m (758 ft)
- Lowest elevation: 144 m (472 ft)
- Population (2023): 1,081
  - Density: 163/km^{2} (422/sq mi)
- Time zone: UTC+01:00 (CET)
  - Summer (DST): UTC+02:00 (CEST)
- INSEE/Postal code: 31418 /31130
- ^{1} French Land Register data, which excludes lakes, ponds, glaciers > 1 km^{2} (0.386 sq mi or 247 acres) and river estuaries.

Pin-Balma (French pronunciation: [pɛ̃ balma]; Occitan: Le Pin de Balmar) is a commune in the Haute-Garonne department in southwestern France.

== Population ==
Historical population
Year	Pop.	±% p.a.
1968	284	—
1975	383	+4.36%
1982	636	+7.51%
1990	678	+0.80%
1999	655	−0.38%
2007	949	+4.74%
2012	968	+0.40%
2017	903	−1.38%
2023	1,081	+3.04%
Source: INSEE

The inhabitants of the commune are known as Pino-Balméens or Pin-Balmanais in French.

== See also ==
- Communes of the Haute-Garonne department
