= Drémil-Lafage =

- Commune
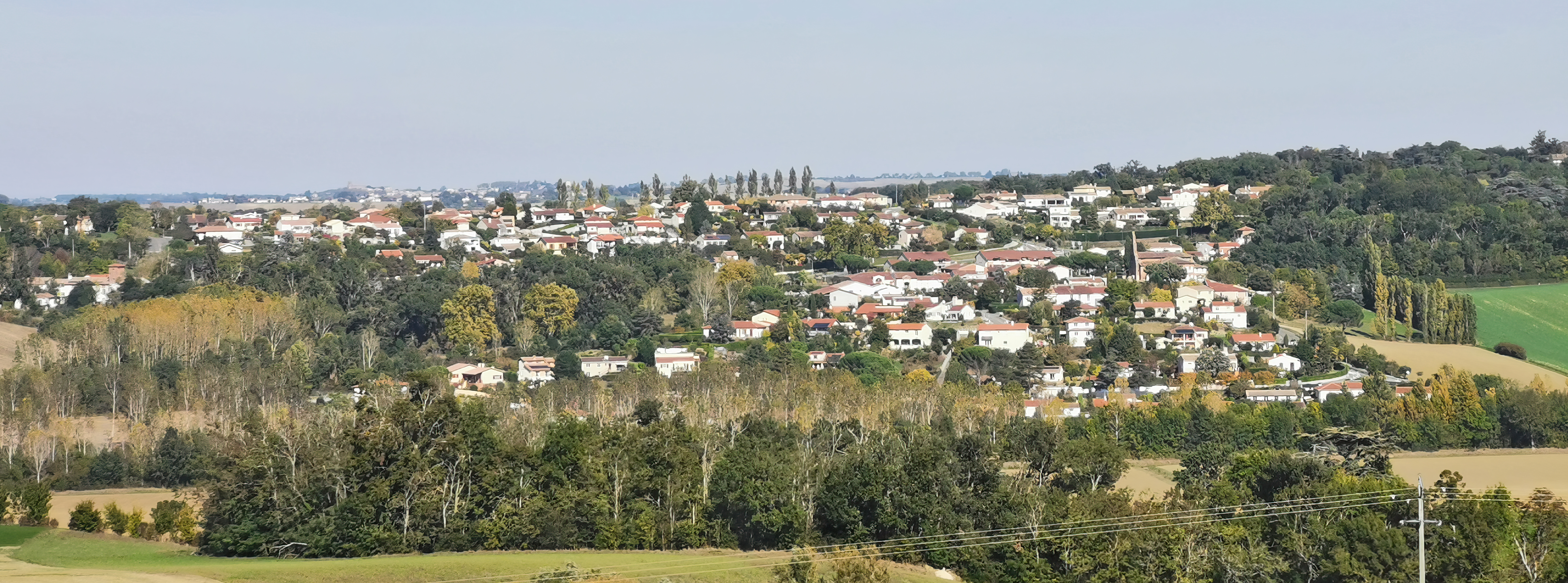
- Drémil-Lafage, Haute-Garonne France - seen from the Montauriol district

- Coat of arms
- Location of Drémil-Lafage
- Location within France Location within Occitanie
- Coordinates: 43°35′55″N 1°36′15″E
- Country: France
- Region: Occitania
- Department: Haute-Garonne
- Arrondissement: Toulouse
- Canton: Toulouse-10
- Intercommunality: Toulouse Métropole

Government
  - Mayor (2020–2026): Ida Russo
- Area^{1}: 12.49 km^{2} (4.82 sq mi)
- Elevation: 340 m (1,120 ft)
- Highest elevation: 244 m (801 ft)
- Lowest elevation: 162 m (531 ft)
- Population (2023): 2,608
  - Density: 208.8/km^{2} (540.8/sq mi)
- Time zone: UTC+01:00 (CET)
  - Summer (DST): UTC+02:00 (CEST)
- INSEE/Postal code: 31163 /31280
- ^{1} French Land Register data, which excludes lakes, ponds, glaciers > 1 km^{2} (0.386 sq mi or 247 acres) and river estuaries.

Drémil-Lafage (French pronunciation: [dʁemil lafaʒ]; Occitan: Dremil e La Faja) is a commune in the Haute-Garonne department in southwestern France. It is located 13 km east from Toulouse.

== Population ==
The inhabitants of the commune are known as Drémilois and Drémiloises in French.

Historical population
Year	Pop.	±% p.a.
1968	409	—
1975	516	+3.38%
1982	925	+8.70%
1990	2,007	+10.17%
1999	2,580	+2.83%
2007	2,639	+0.28%
2012	2,407	−1.82%
2017	2,652	+1.96%
2023	2,608	−0.28%
Source: INSEE

== See also ==
- Communes of the Haute-Garonne department
