= Balma =

- Commune
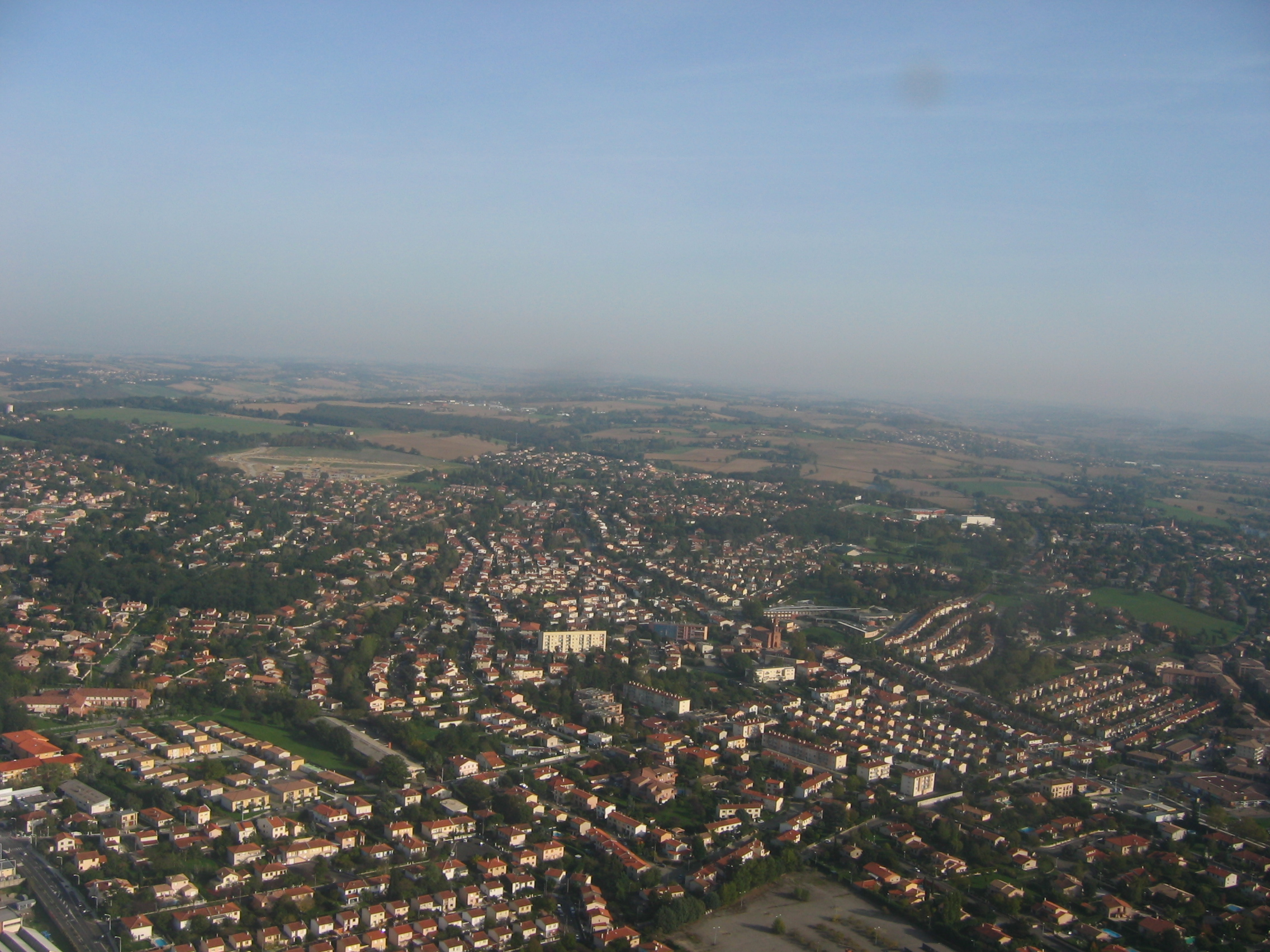
- An aerial view of Balma

- Coat of arms
- Location of Balma
- Location within France Location within Occitanie
- Coordinates: 43°36′40″N 1°29′58″E
- Country: France
- Region: Occitania
- Department: Haute-Garonne
- Arrondissement: Toulouse
- Canton: Toulouse-10
- Intercommunality: Toulouse Métropole

Government
  - Mayor (2020–2026): Vincent Terrail-Novès
- Area^{1}: 16.59 km^{2} (6.41 sq mi)
- Highest elevation: 218 m (715 ft)
- Lowest elevation: 135 m (443 ft)
- Population (2023): 17,772
  - Density: 1,071/km^{2} (2,775/sq mi)
- Time zone: UTC+01:00 (CET)
  - Summer (DST): UTC+02:00 (CEST)
- INSEE/Postal code: 31044 /31130
- ^{1} French Land Register data, which excludes lakes, ponds, glaciers > 1 km^{2} (0.386 sq mi or 247 acres) and river estuaries.

Balma (French pronunciation: [balma]; Occitan: Balmar) is a commune in the Haute-Garonne department in southwestern France. It is east of Toulouse.

The name of the town comes from the Occitan word meaning "cave" or "grotto".

== History ==
Balma was established in 1279 as a fief of the bishopric of Toulouse.

== Population ==
The inhabitants of the commune are known as Balmanais in French.

Historical population

Year	Pop.	±% p.a.
1793	546	—
1800	544	−0.05%
1806	603	+1.73%
1821	635	+0.35%
1831	790	+2.21%
1836	802	+0.30%
1841	785	−0.43%
1846	863	+1.91%
1851	883	+0.46%
1856	840	−0.99%
1861	835	−0.12%
1866	795	−0.98%
1872	797	+0.04%
1876	877	+2.42%
1881	893	+0.36%
1886	944	+1.12%
1891	916	−0.60%
1896	965	+1.05%
1901	913	−1.10%

Year	Pop.	±% p.a.
1906	909	−0.09%
1911	886	−0.51%
1921	821	−0.76%
1926	868	+1.12%
1931	937	+1.54%
1936	966	+0.61%
1946	1,276	+2.82%
1954	1,724	+3.83%
1962	2,890	+6.67%
1968	4,276	+6.75%
1975	7,127	+7.57%
1982	8,117	+1.88%
1990	9,506	+1.99%
1999	11,944	+2.57%
2007	12,946	+1.01%
2012	14,245	+1.93%
2017	16,568	+3.07%
2023	17,772	+1.18%

Source: EHESS and INSEE (1968-2023)

== Sport ==
Balma is the home of Championnat de France Amateurs club, Balma SC.

== Monument ==
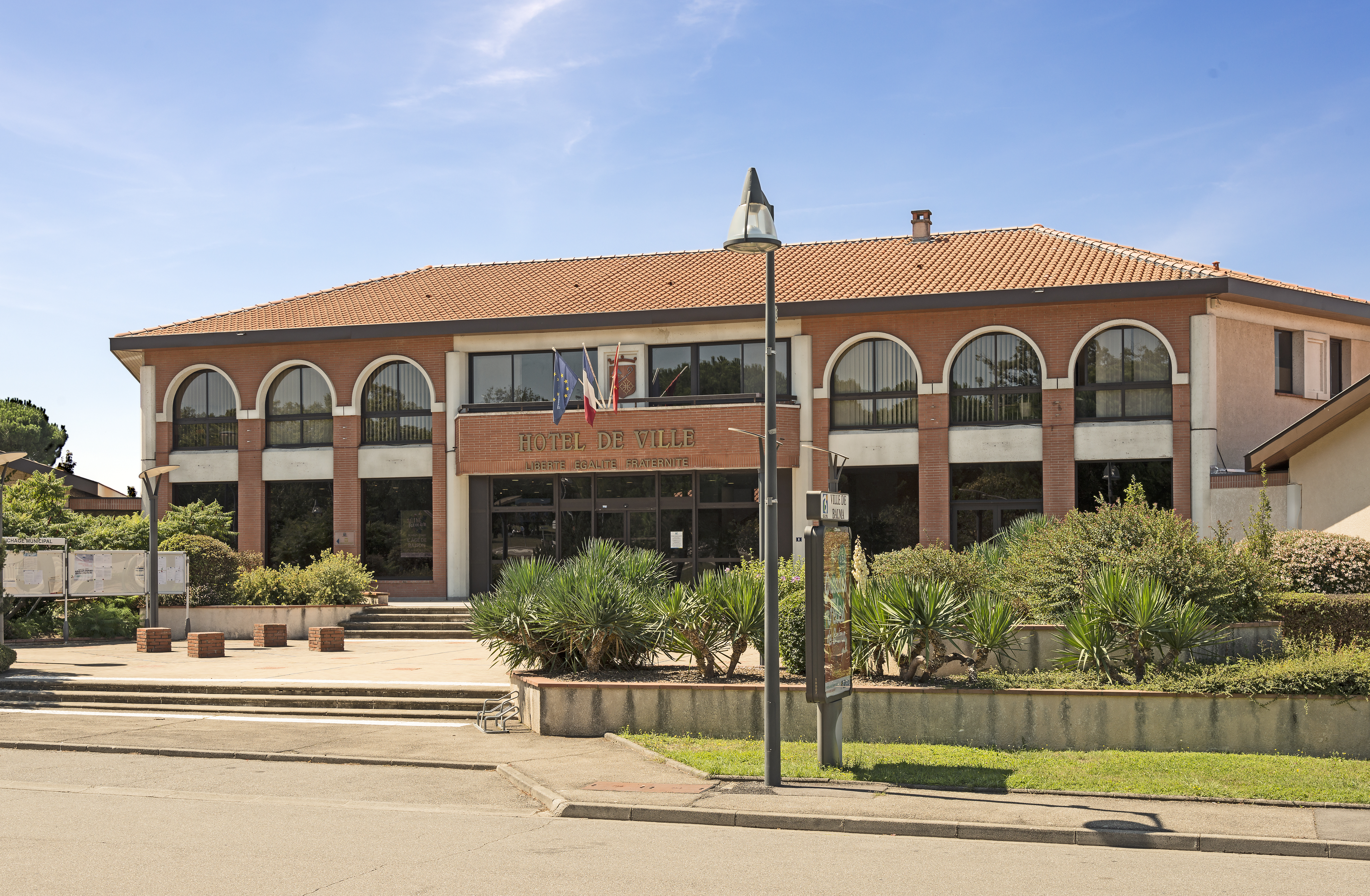
Town hall

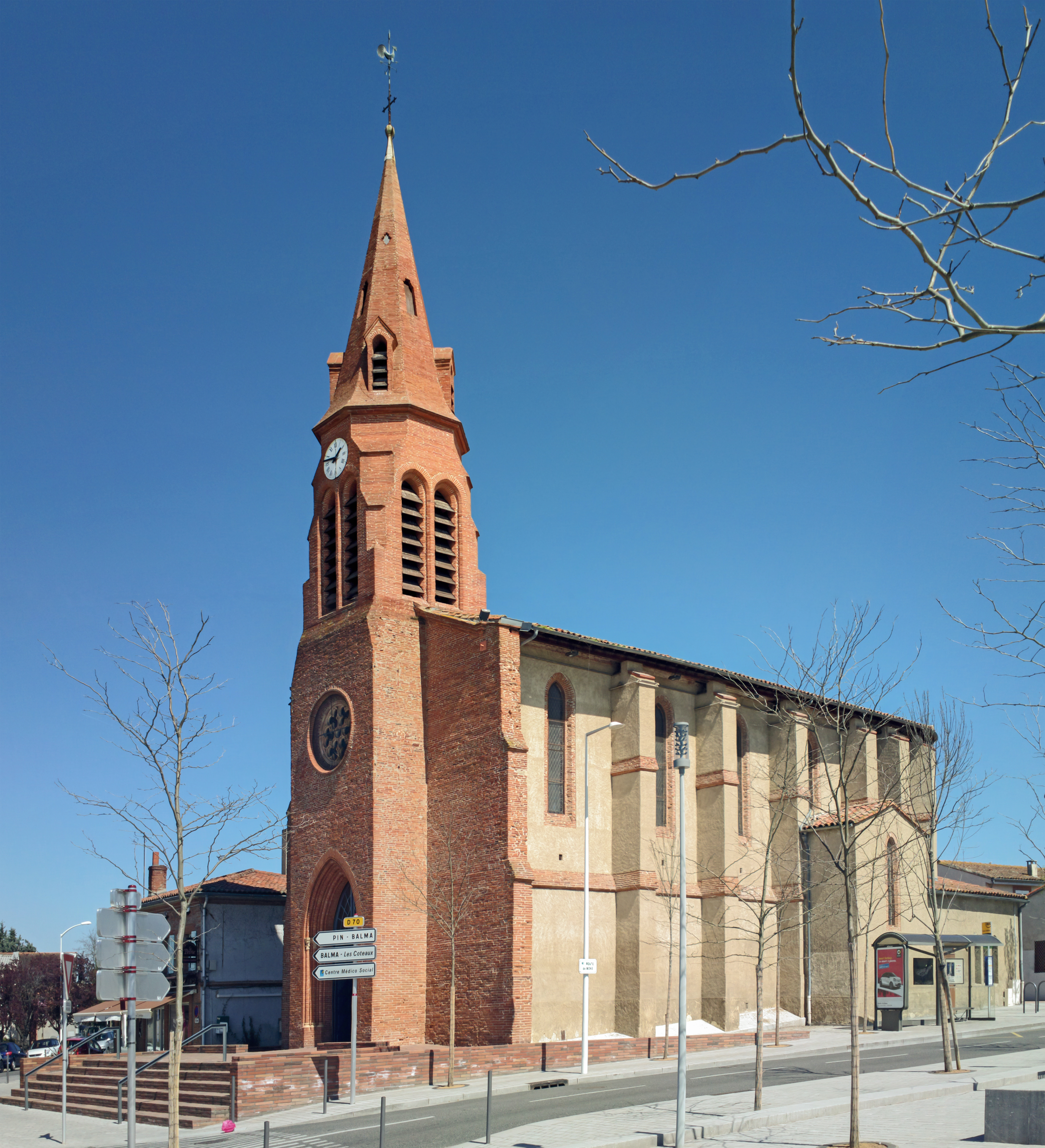
Saint-Joseph church

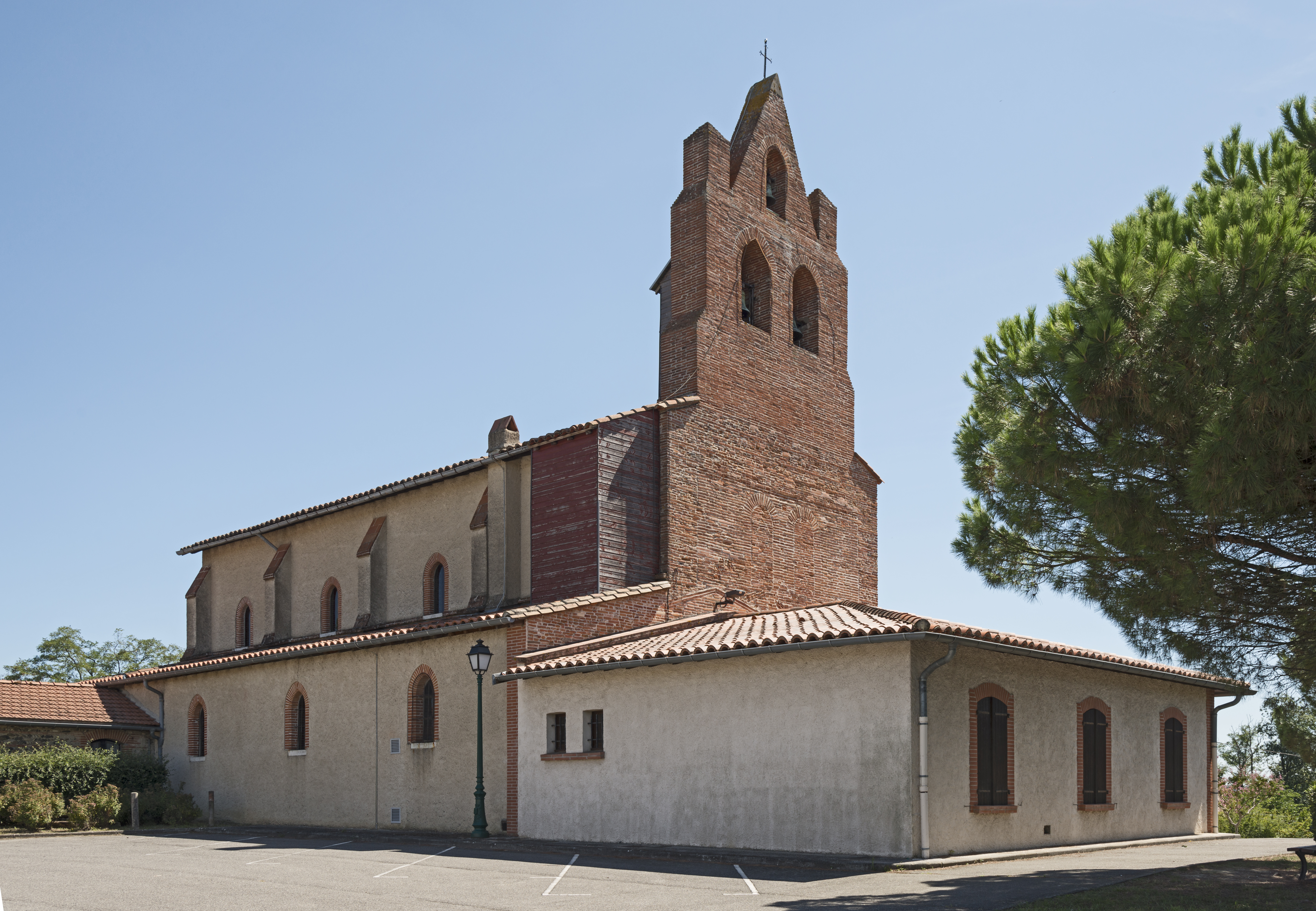
Saint-Martin-de-Boville church

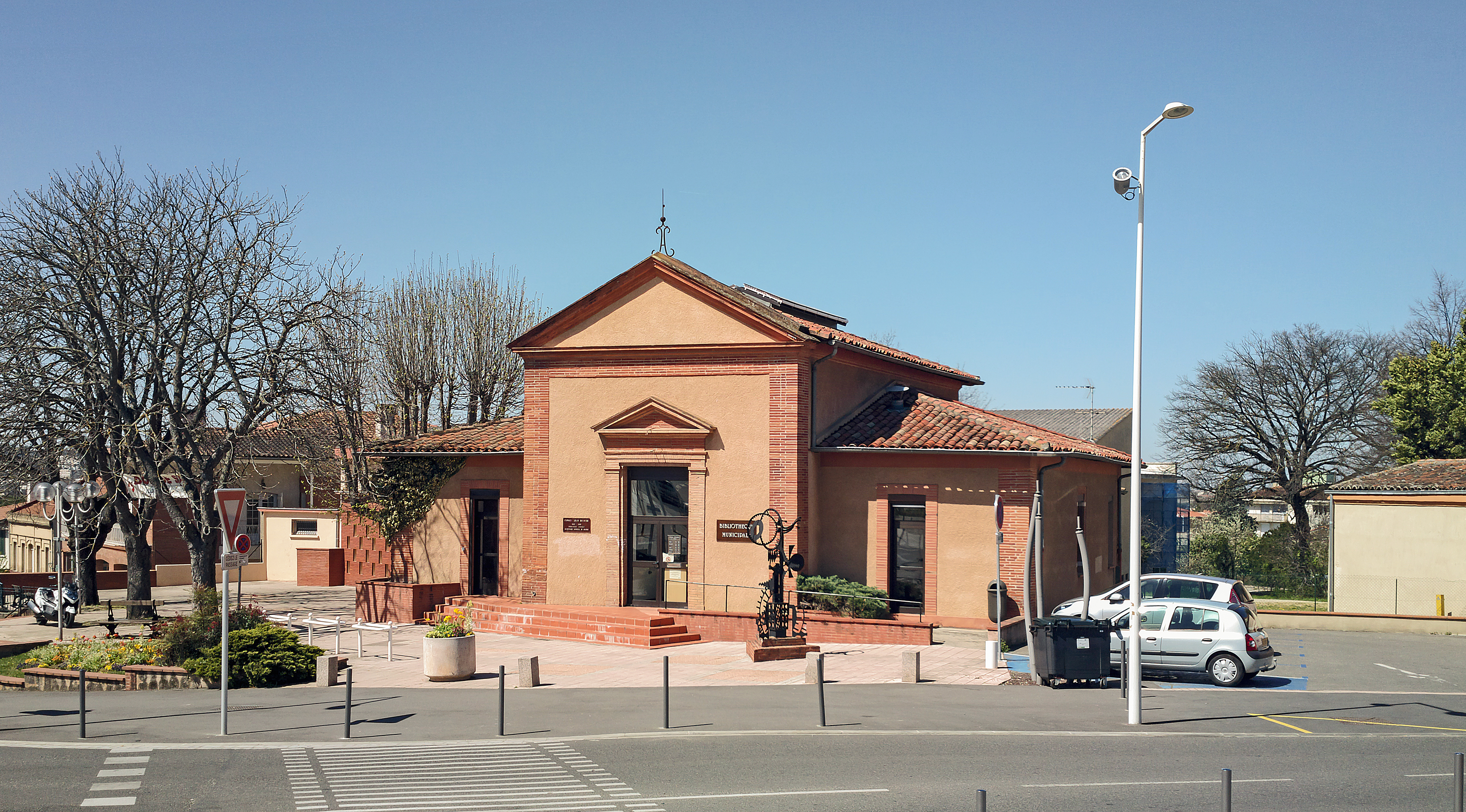
Public Library

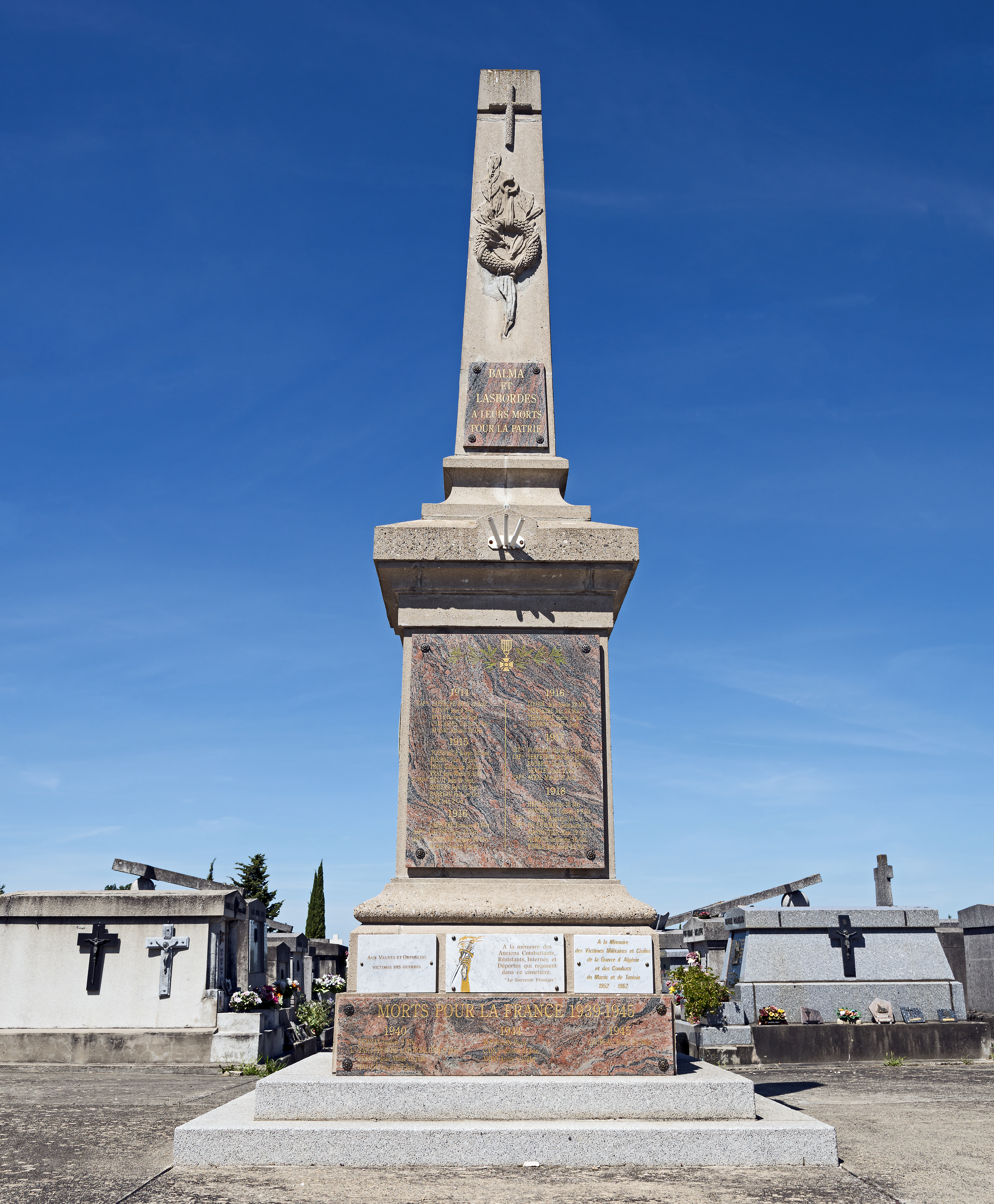
War monument

== See also ==
- Toulouse - Lasbordes Airport
- Stade Municipal de Balma
- 11th Parachute Brigade
- Communes of the Haute-Garonne department
