= Flourens, Haute-Garonne =

Flourens
- Commune
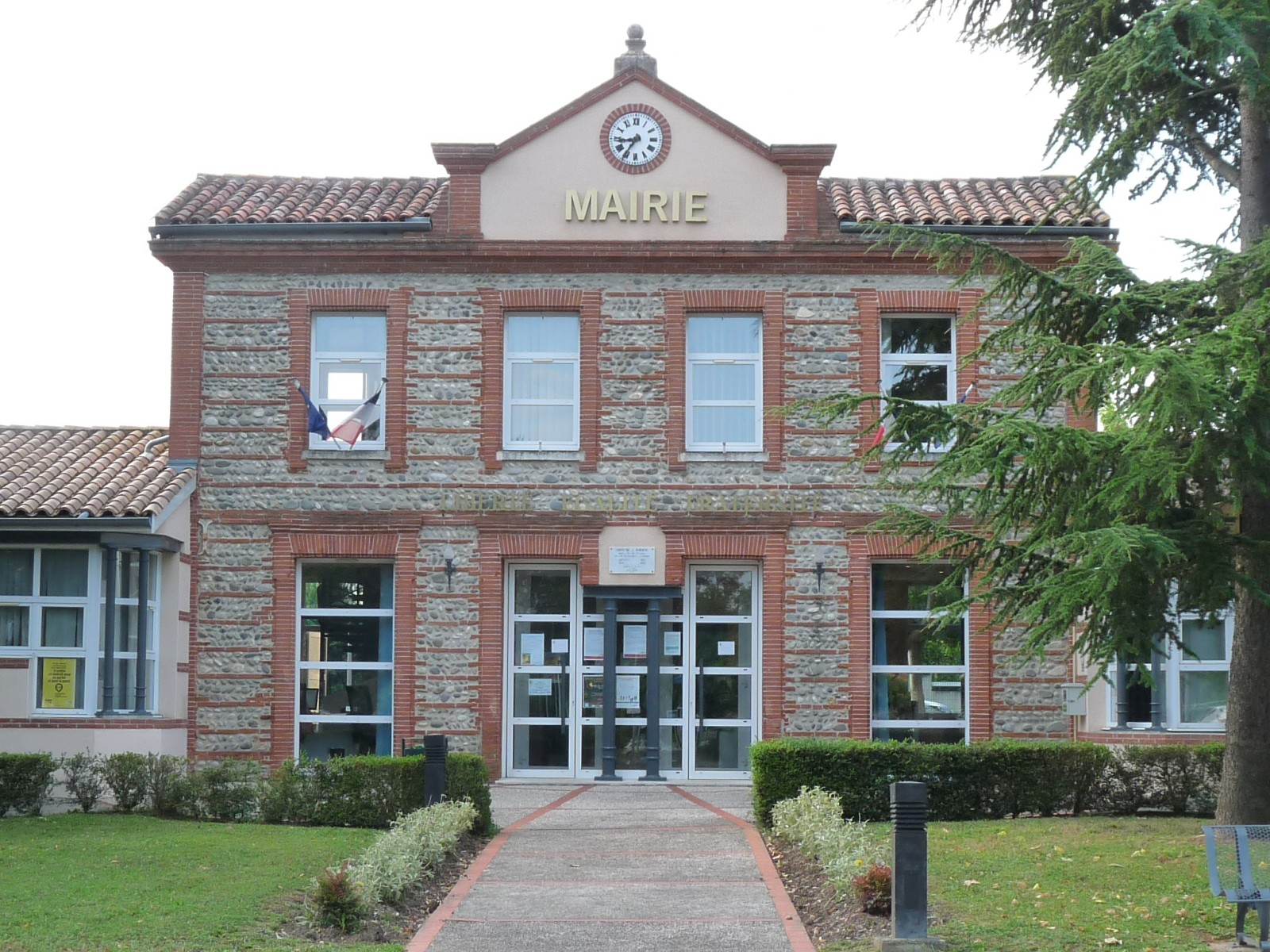
- The town hall in Flourens
- Location of Flourens
- Location within France Location within Occitanie
- Coordinates: 43°35′47″N 1°33′48″E
- Country: France
- Region: Occitania
- Department: Haute-Garonne
- Arrondissement: Toulouse
- Canton: Toulouse-10
- Intercommunality: Toulouse Métropole

Government
  - Mayor (2024–2026): Marion Rivoire
- Area^{1}: 9.74 km^{2} (3.76 sq mi)
- Elevation: 294 m (965 ft)
- Highest elevation: 243 m (797 ft)
- Lowest elevation: 152 m (499 ft)
- Population (2023): 2,084
  - Density: 214/km^{2} (554/sq mi)
- Time zone: UTC+01:00 (CET)
  - Summer (DST): UTC+02:00 (CEST)
- INSEE/Postal code: 31184 /31130
- ^{1} French Land Register data, which excludes lakes, ponds, glaciers > 1 km^{2} (0.386 sq mi or 247 acres) and river estuaries.

Flourens (French pronunciation: [fluʁɛ̃s]; Occitan: Florenç) is a commune in the Haute-Garonne department in southwestern France.

== Population ==
The inhabitants of the commune are known as Flourensois and Flourensoises in French.

Historical population
Year	Pop.	±% p.a.
1968	424	—
1975	592	+4.88%
1982	930	+6.67%
1990	1,506	+6.21%
1999	1,793	+1.96%
2007	1,725	−0.48%
2012	1,814	+1.01%
2017	1,963	+1.59%
2023	2,084	+1.00%
Source: INSEE

== See also ==
- Communes of the Haute-Garonne department
