= Montrabé =

Commune in France

- Commune
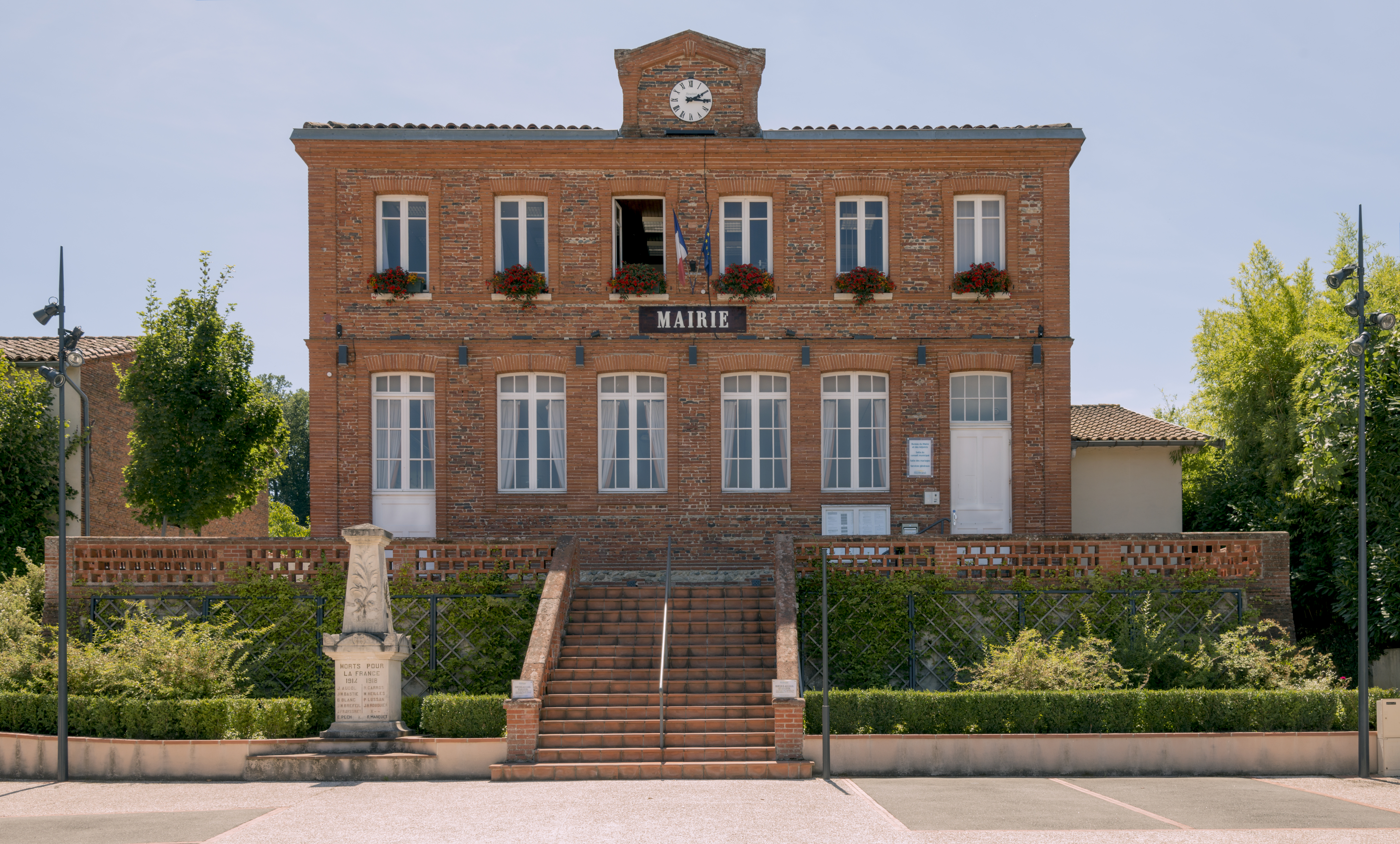
- The town hall in Montrabé

- Coat of arms
- Location of Montrabé
- Location within France Location within Occitanie
- Coordinates: 43°38′36″N 1°31′33″E
- Country: France
- Region: Occitania
- Department: Haute-Garonne
- Arrondissement: Toulouse
- Canton: Toulouse-10
- Intercommunality: Toulouse Métropole

Government
  - Mayor (2020–2026): Jacques Sébi
- Area^{1}: 5.23 km^{2} (2.02 sq mi)
- Elevation: 150 m (490 ft)
- Highest elevation: 211 m (692 ft)
- Lowest elevation: 143 m (469 ft)
- Population (2023): 4,473
  - Density: 855/km^{2} (2,220/sq mi)
- Time zone: UTC+01:00 (CET)
  - Summer (DST): UTC+02:00 (CEST)
- INSEE/Postal code: 31389 /31850
- ^{1} French Land Register data, which excludes lakes, ponds, glaciers > 1 km^{2} (0.386 sq mi or 247 acres) and river estuaries.

Montrabé (French pronunciation: [mɔ̃ʁabe]; Occitan: Monrabe) is a commune in the Haute-Garonne department of southwestern France. Montrabé station has rail connections to Toulouse, Albi and Castres.

== Population ==
The inhabitants of the commune are known as Montrabéens in French.

Historical population
Year	Pop.	±% p.a.
1968	353	—
1975	821	+12.82%
1982	1,740	+11.33%
1990	2,347	+3.81%
1999	3,201	+3.51%
2007	3,350	+0.57%
2012	3,815	+2.63%
2017	4,106	+1.48%
2023	4,473	+1.44%
Source: INSEE

== Monuments ==
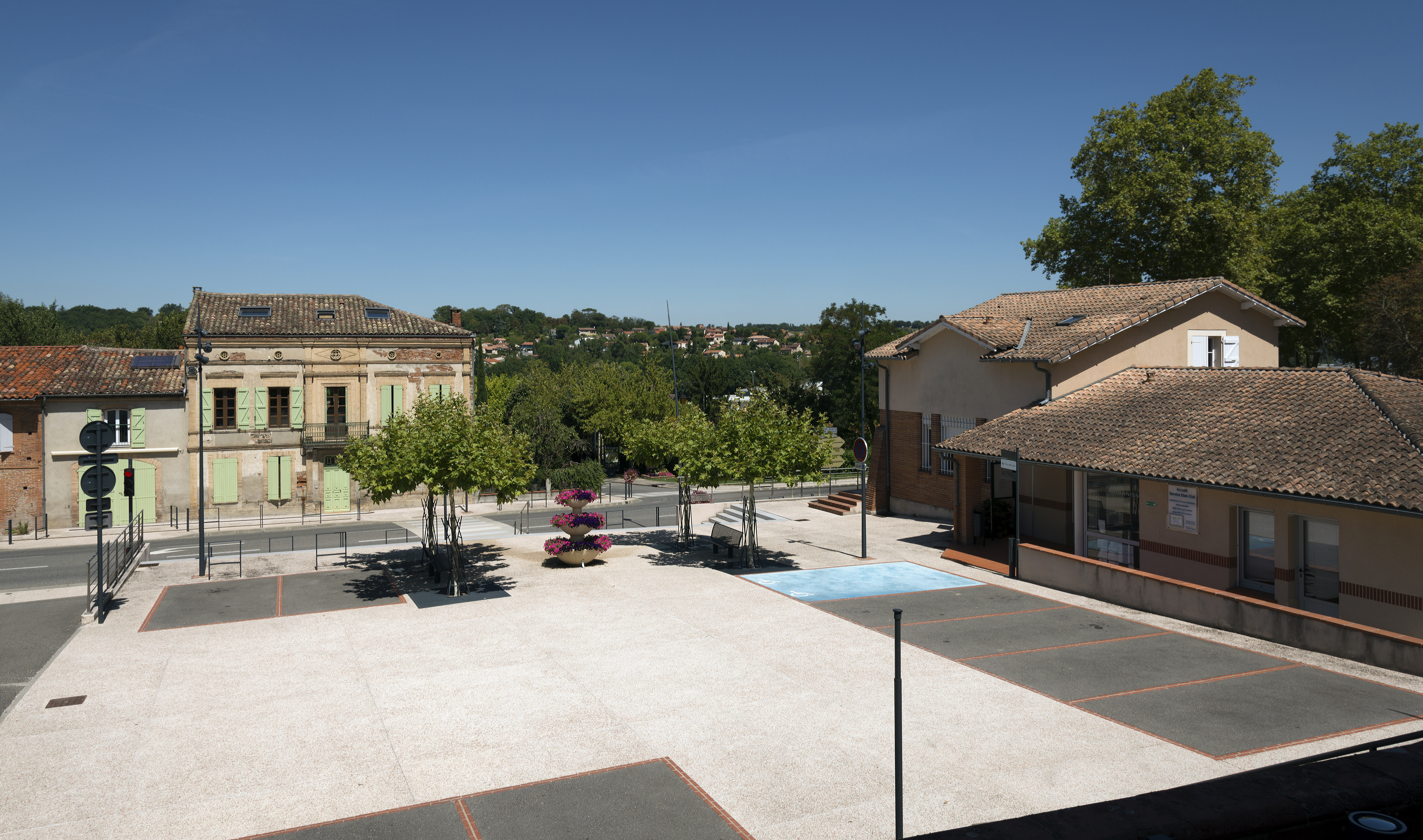
Place François Mitterrand

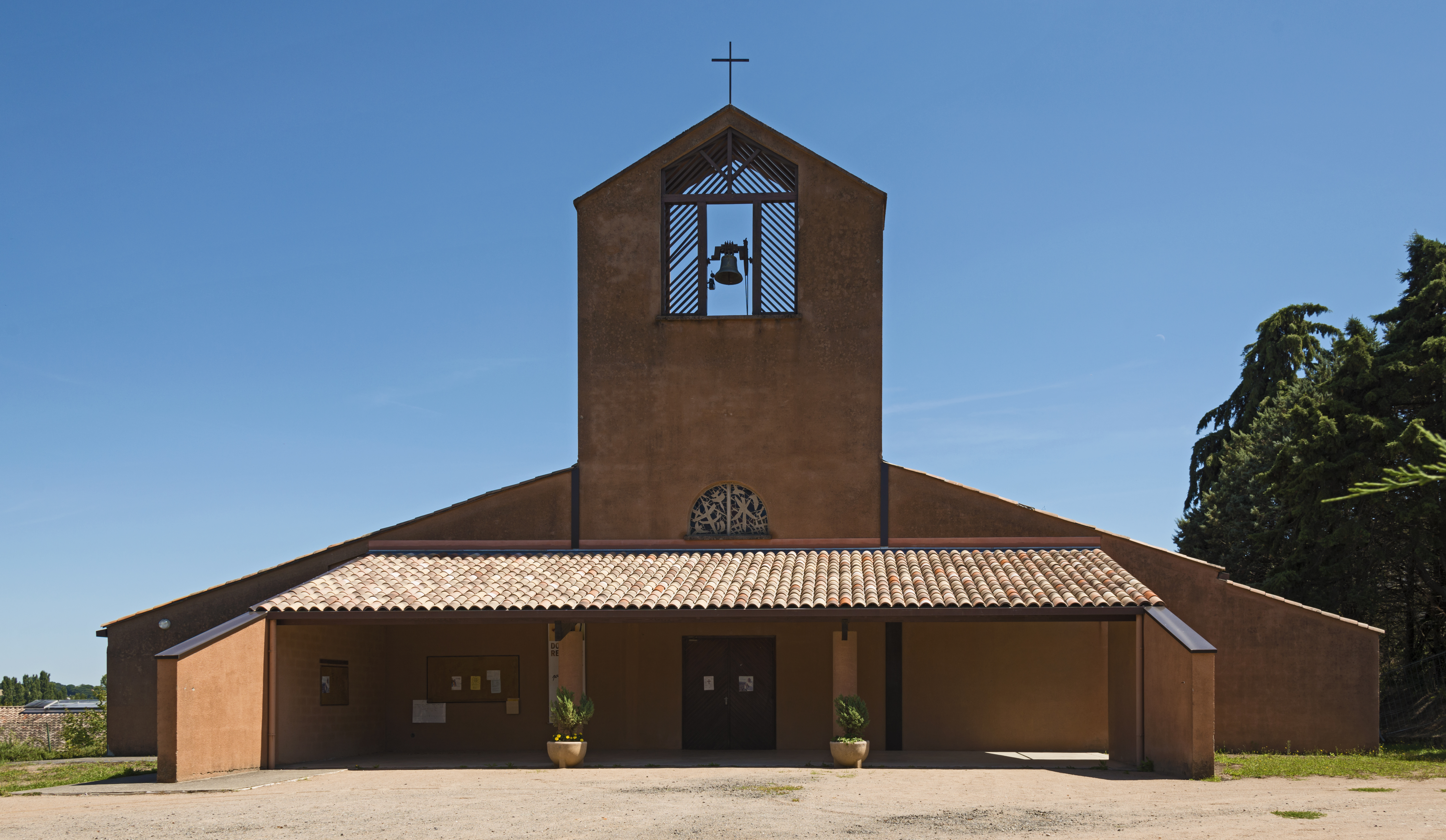
St-Martial church

== See also ==
- Communes of the Haute-Garonne department
