= Saint-Jean, Haute-Garonne =

Saint-Jean
- Commune
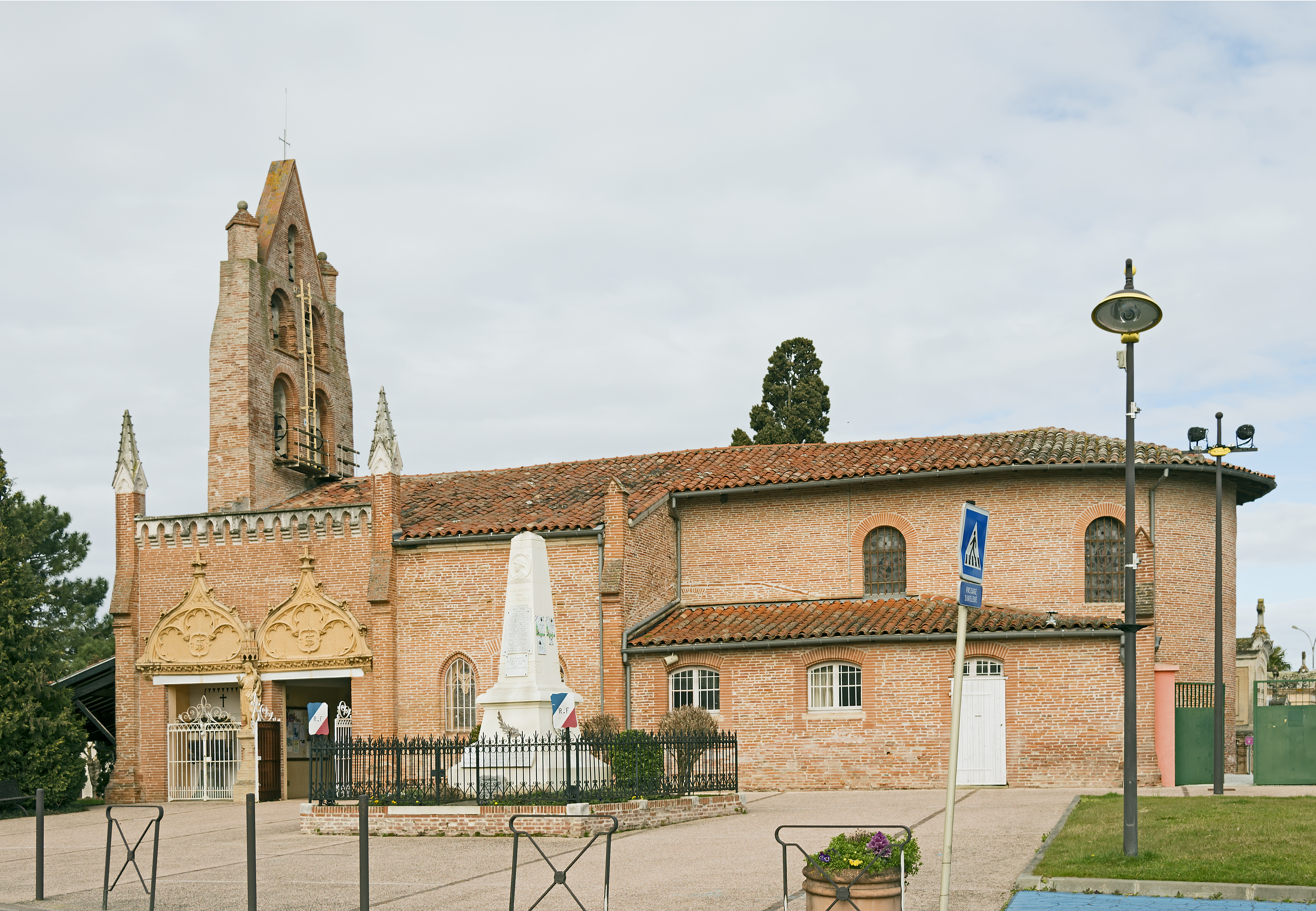
- The church in Saint-Jean

- Coat of arms
- Location of Saint-Jean
- Location within France Location within Occitanie
- Coordinates: 43°39′59″N 1°30′21″E
- Country: France
- Region: Occitania
- Department: Haute-Garonne
- Arrondissement: Toulouse
- Canton: Toulouse-9
- Intercommunality: Toulouse Métropole

Government
  - Mayor (2020–2026): Bruno Espic
- Area^{1}: 5.94 km^{2} (2.29 sq mi)
- Elevation: 205 m (673 ft)
- Highest elevation: 211 m (692 ft)
- Lowest elevation: 145 m (476 ft)
- Population (2023): 11,261
  - Density: 1,900/km^{2} (4,910/sq mi)
- Time zone: UTC+01:00 (CET)
  - Summer (DST): UTC+02:00 (CEST)
- INSEE/Postal code: 31488 /31240
- ^{1} French Land Register data, which excludes lakes, ponds, glaciers > 1 km^{2} (0.386 sq mi or 247 acres) and river estuaries.

Saint-Jean (French pronunciation: [sɛ̃ ʒɑ̃]; Languedocien: Sent Joan le Vièlh) is a commune in the Haute-Garonne department in southwestern France.

It is located northeast of Toulouse on the N88 or road of Albi (exit 14 on the peripheral).

== Population ==
The inhabitants of the commune are known as Saint-Jeannais in French.

Historical population
Year	Pop.	±% p.a.
1968	1,887	—
1975	4,787	+14.22%
1982	6,512	+4.49%
1990	7,168	+1.21%
1999	8,362	+1.73%
2007	9,667	+1.83%
2012	10,319	+1.31%
2017	10,694	+0.72%
2023	11,261	+0.86%
Source: INSEE

== Sights ==
One of the commune's main points of interest is its historic church.

== Notable people ==
- Camille Razat - born and raised in Saint-Jean.

== Monument ==
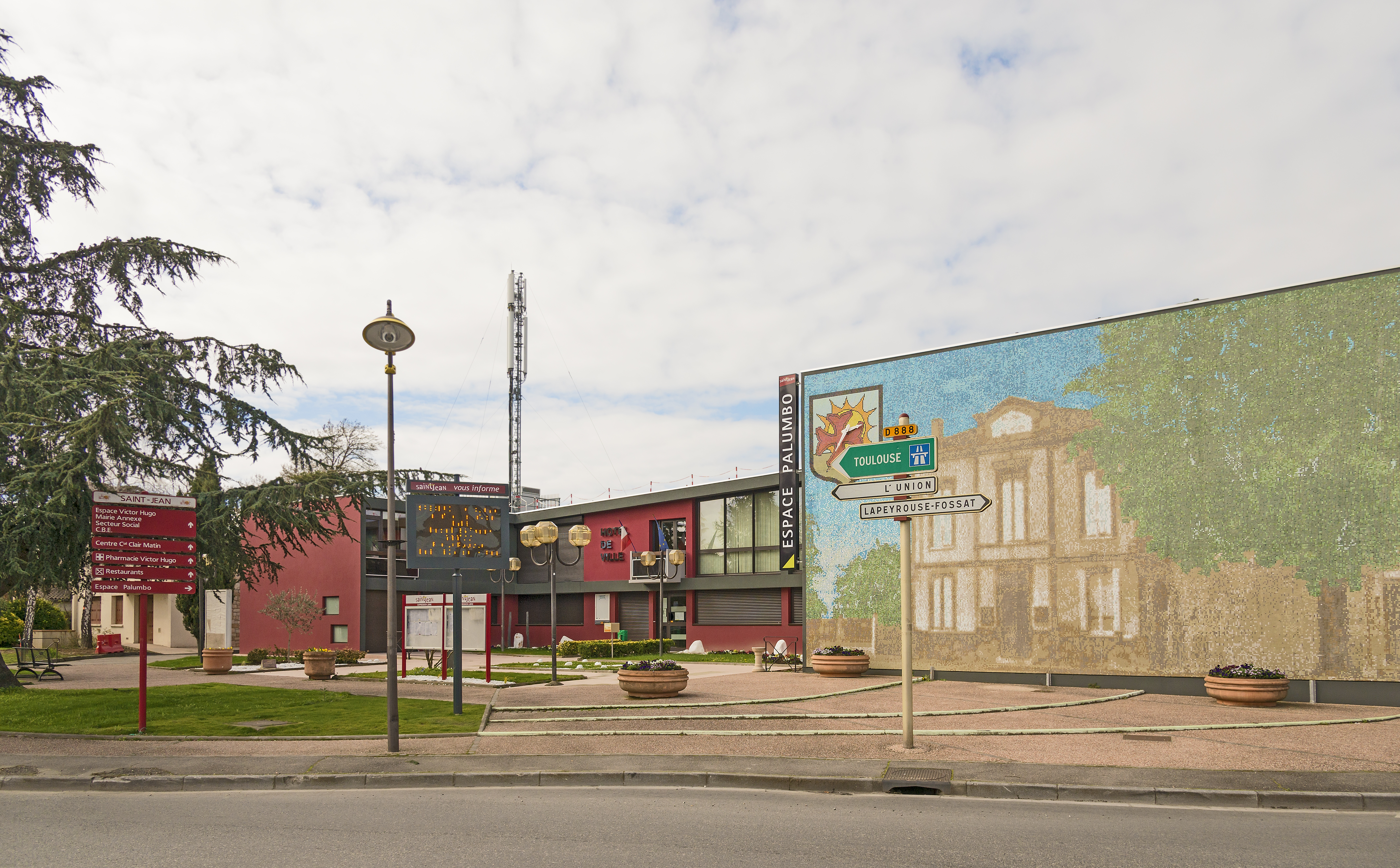
The town hall.

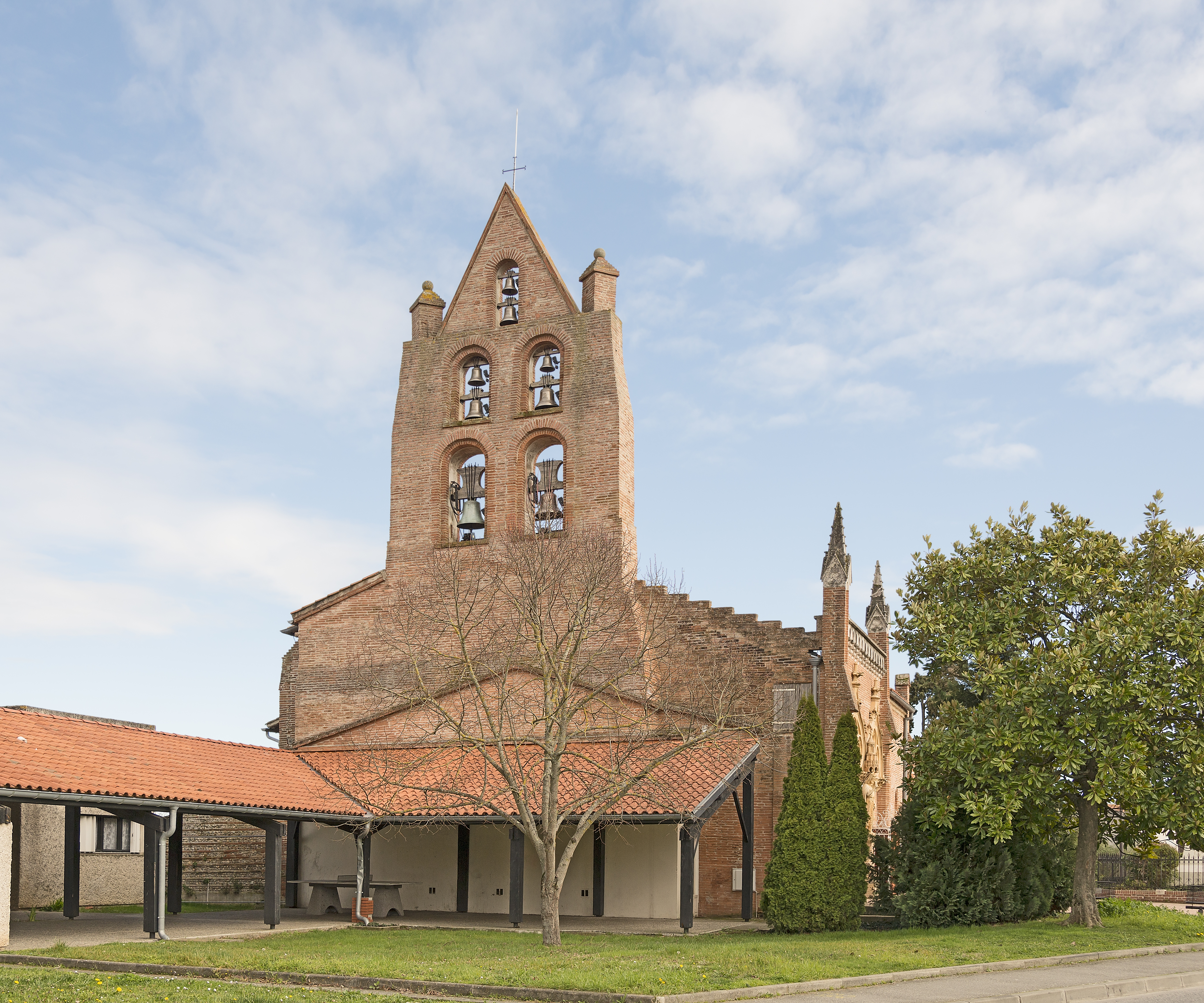
Church "Saint Jean-Baptiste", bell gable.

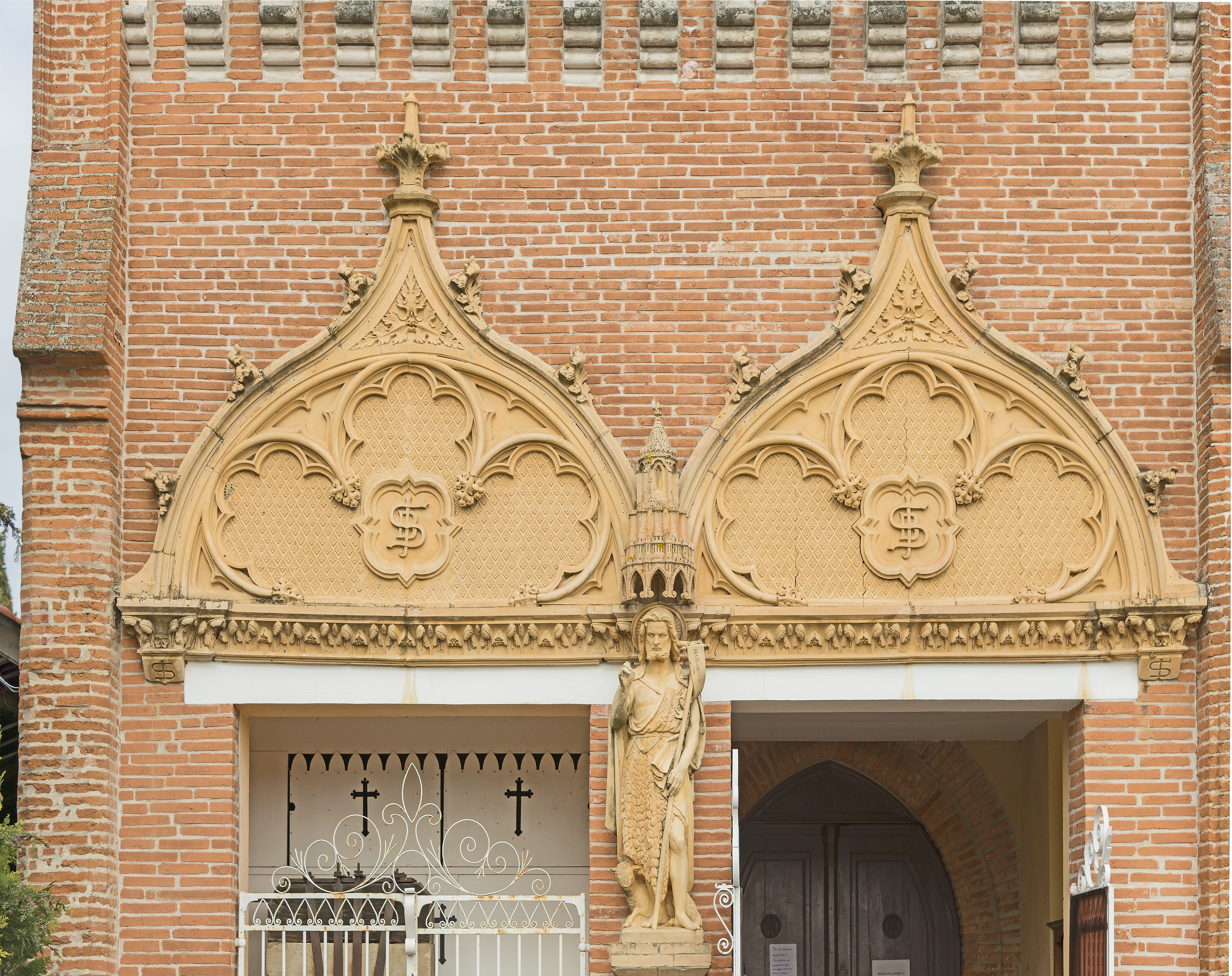
Church "Saint Jean-Baptiste"

== International relations ==
Saint-Jean is twinned with:

- Fontanafredda, Italy

== See also ==
- Communes of the Haute-Garonne department
