= Launaguet =

- Commune
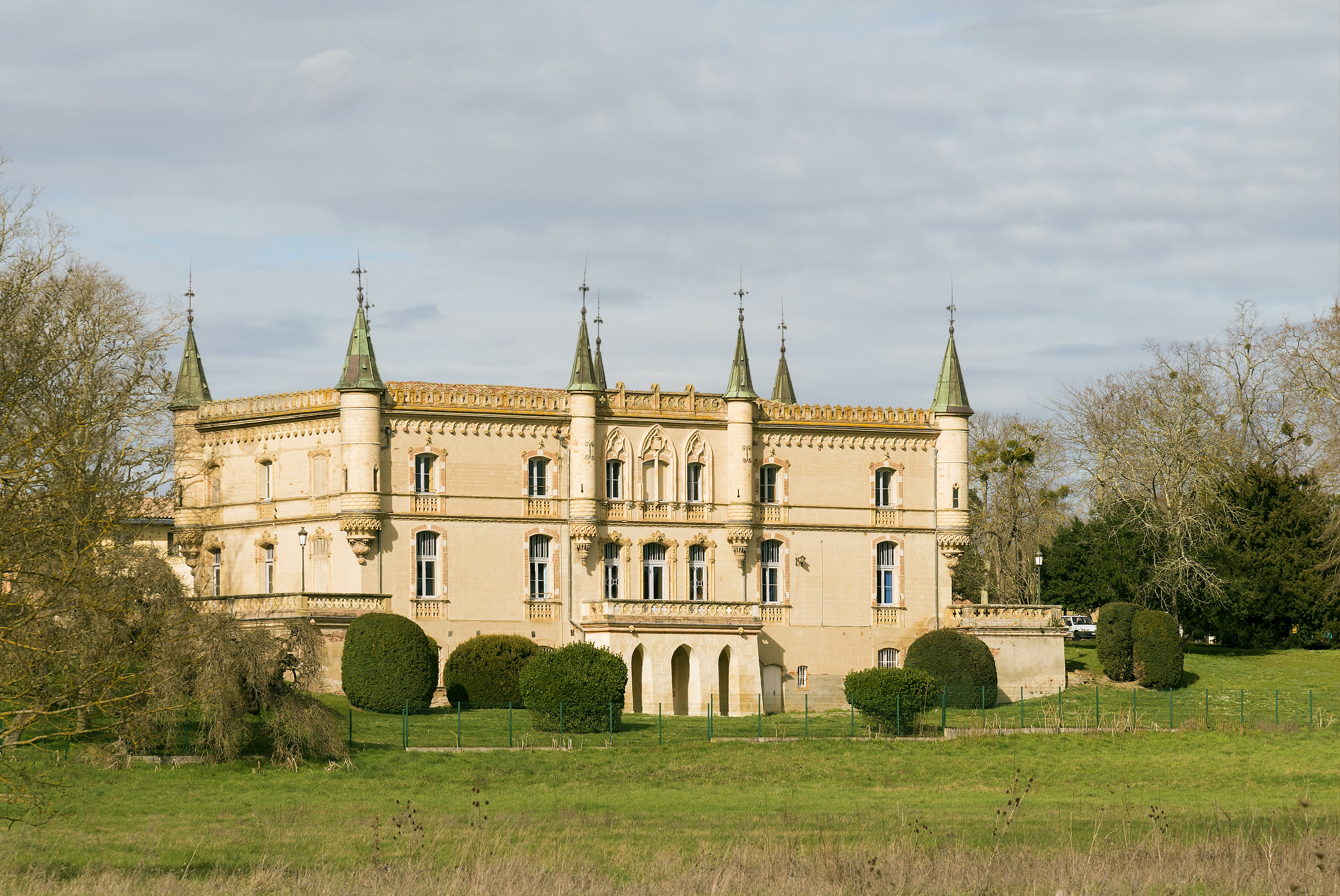
- Château de Launaguet - Current City Hall.

- Coat of arms
- Location of Launaguet
- Location within France Location within Occitanie
- Coordinates: 43°40′30″N 1°27′28″E
- Country: France
- Region: Occitania
- Department: Haute-Garonne
- Arrondissement: Toulouse
- Canton: Toulouse-8
- Intercommunality: Toulouse Métropole

Government
  - Mayor (2020–2026): Michel Rougé
- Area^{1}: 7.02 km^{2} (2.71 sq mi)
- Elevation: 135 m (443 ft)
- Highest elevation: 203 m (666 ft)
- Lowest elevation: 126 m (413 ft)
- Population (2023): 9,173
  - Density: 1,310/km^{2} (3,380/sq mi)
- Time zone: UTC+01:00 (CET)
  - Summer (DST): UTC+02:00 (CEST)
- INSEE/Postal code: 31282 /31140
- ^{1} French Land Register data, which excludes lakes, ponds, glaciers > 1 km^{2} (0.386 sq mi or 247 acres) and river estuaries.

Launaguet (French pronunciation: [lonaɡɛ]; Occitan: Launaguet) is a commune in the Haute-Garonne department in southwestern France.

== Population ==
The inhabitants of the commune are known as Launaguetois or Launaguetoises in French.

Historical population
Year	Pop.	±% p.a.
1968	1,407	—
1975	2,771	+10.17%
1982	2,842	+0.36%
1990	3,768	+3.59%
1999	5,086	+3.39%
2007	6,926	+3.94%
2012	7,469	+1.52%
2017	8,880	+3.52%
2023	9,173	+0.54%
Source: INSEE

== Sights ==
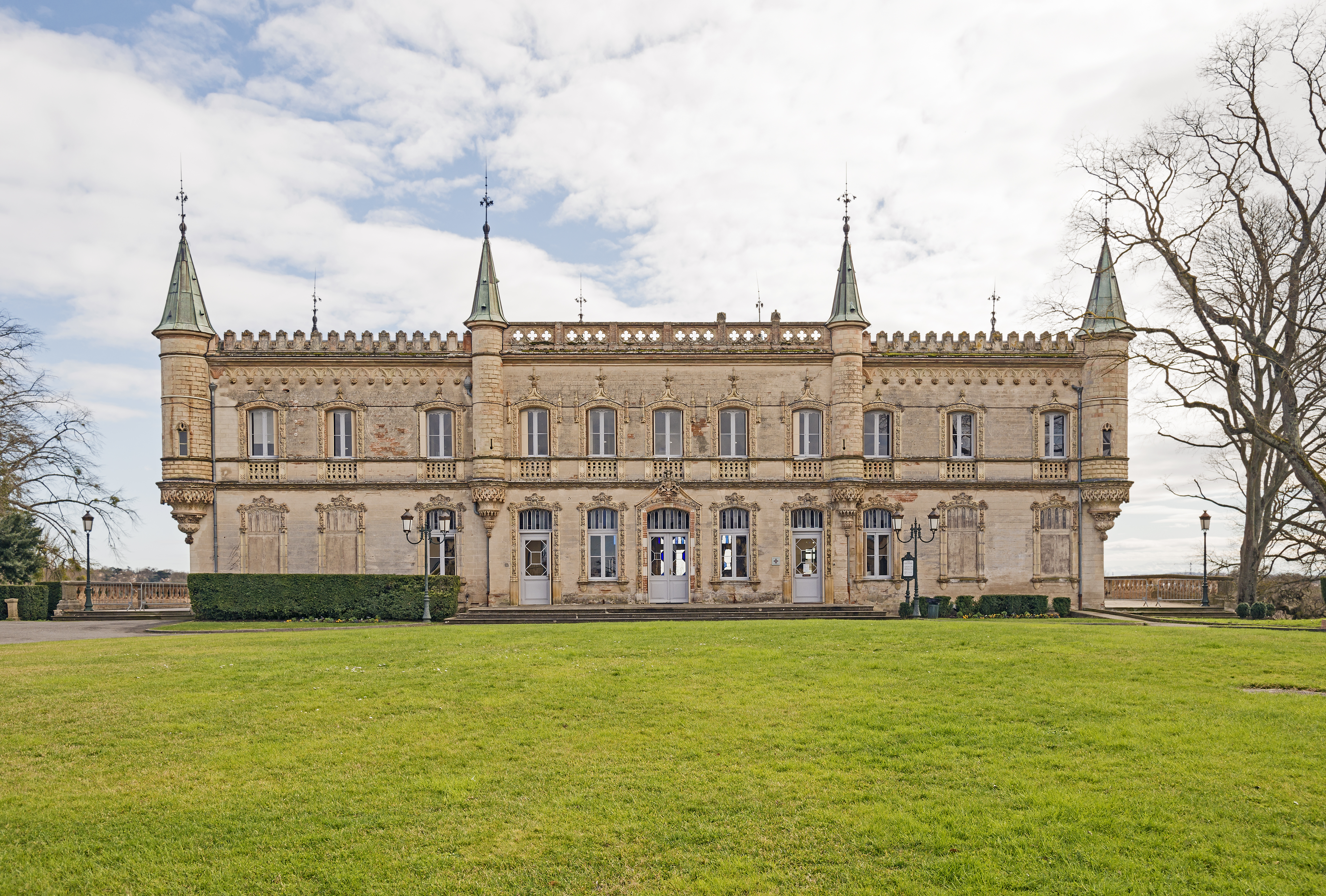
Chateau facade

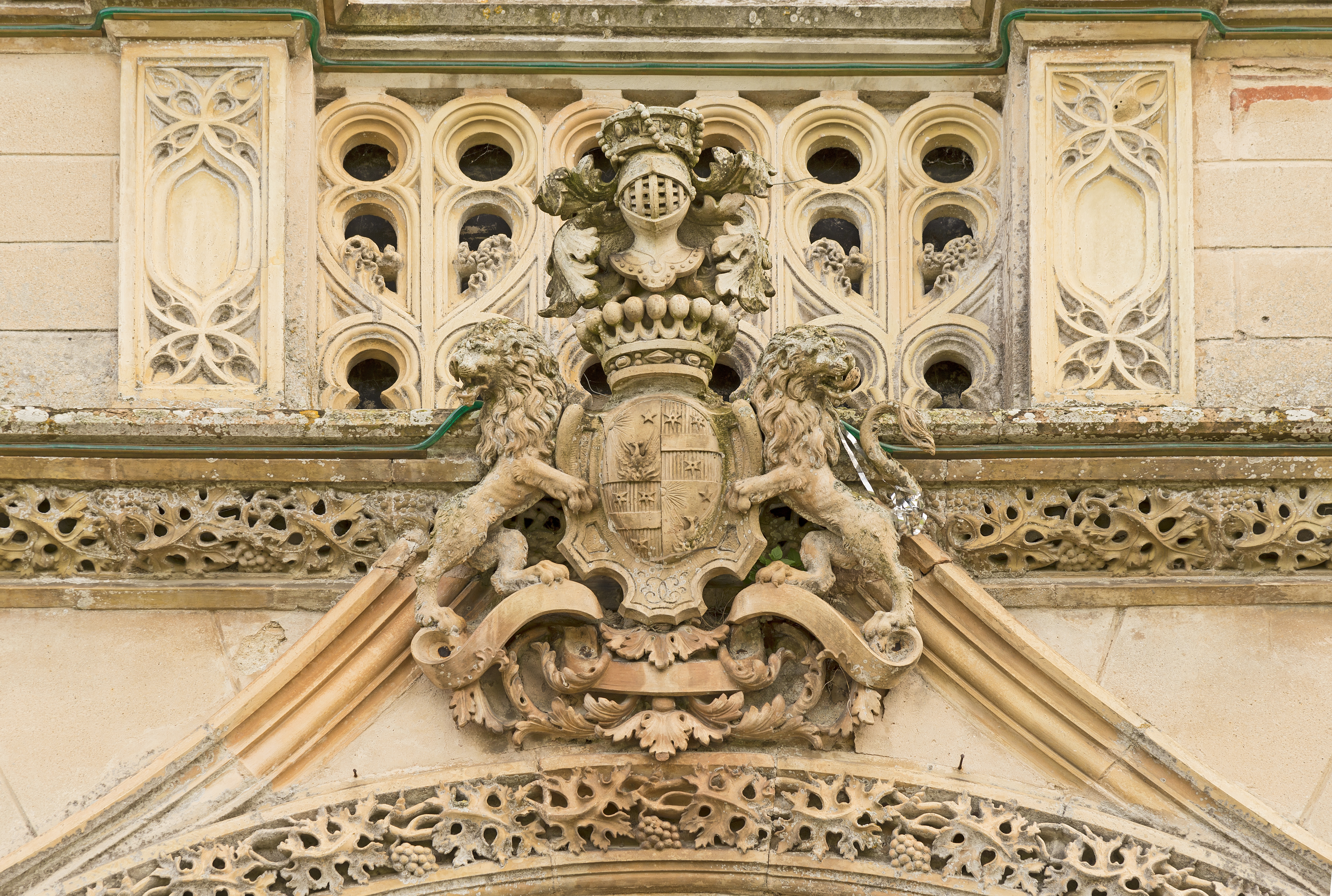
Chateau entrance

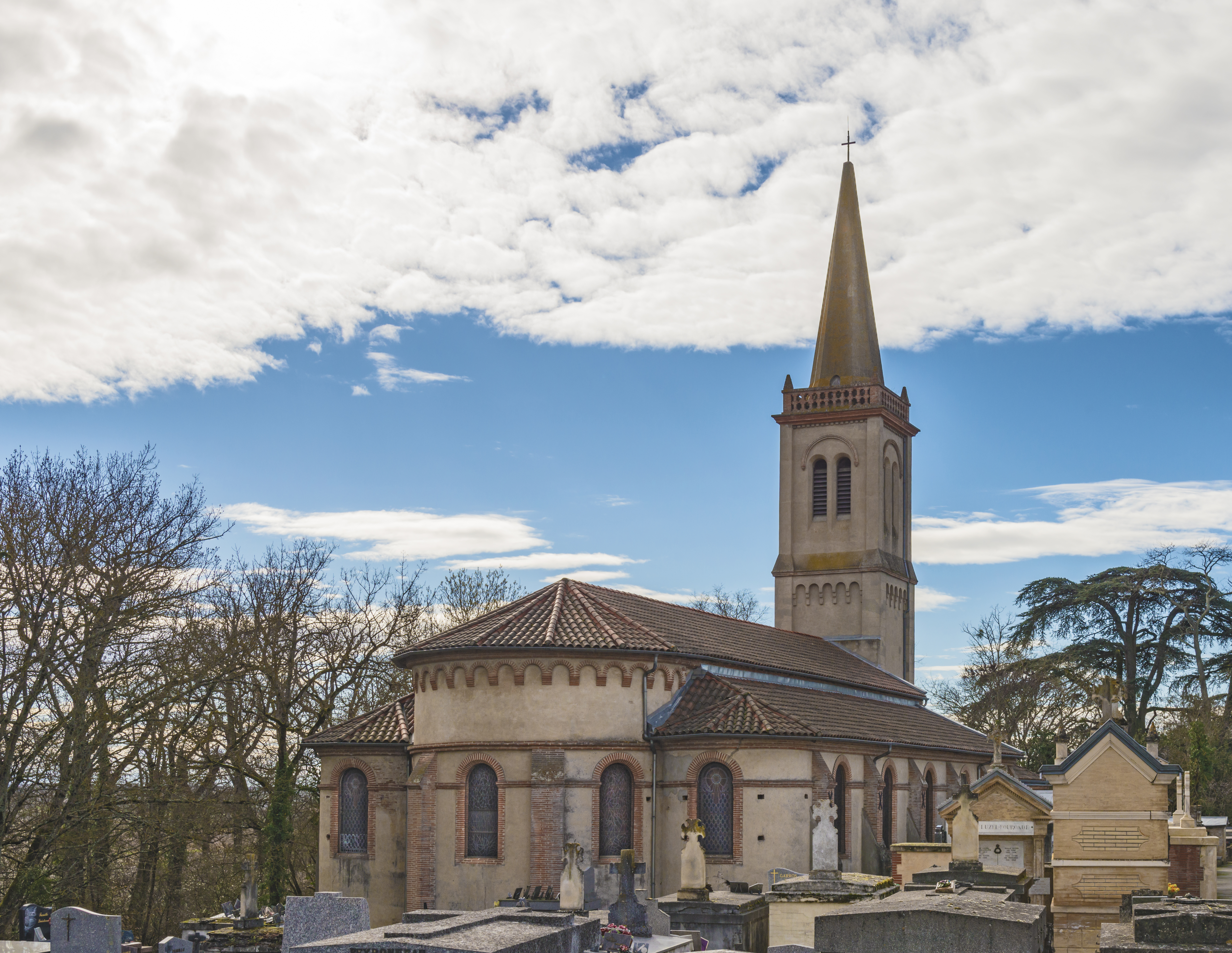
Saint Barthélemy apse

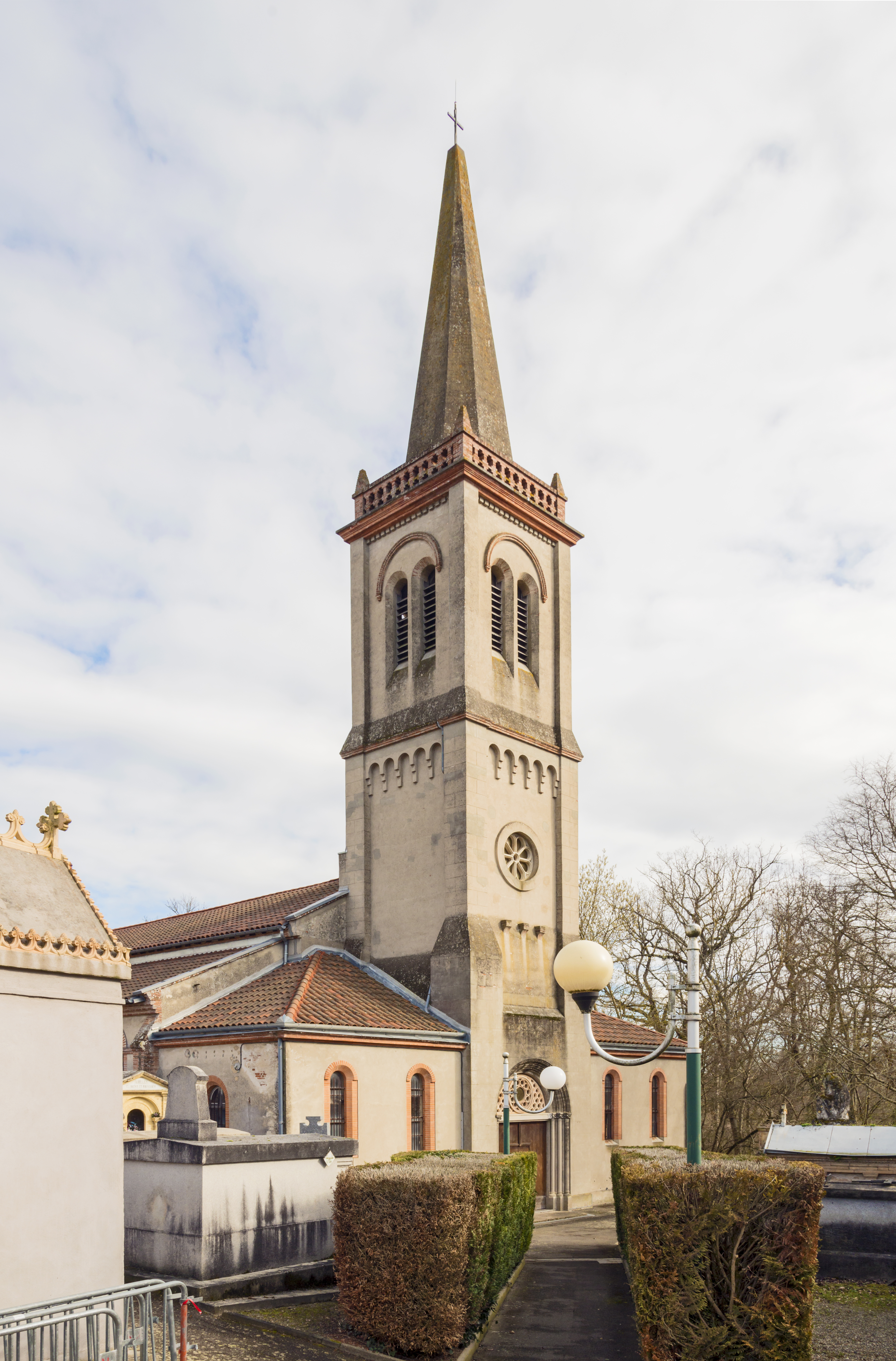
Bell tower

== Twin towns ==
Launaguet is twinned with:

- Orăștie, Romania

== See also ==
- Communes of the Haute-Garonne department
